= Diocese of Artsakh =

Diocese of Artsakh Արցախի թեմ
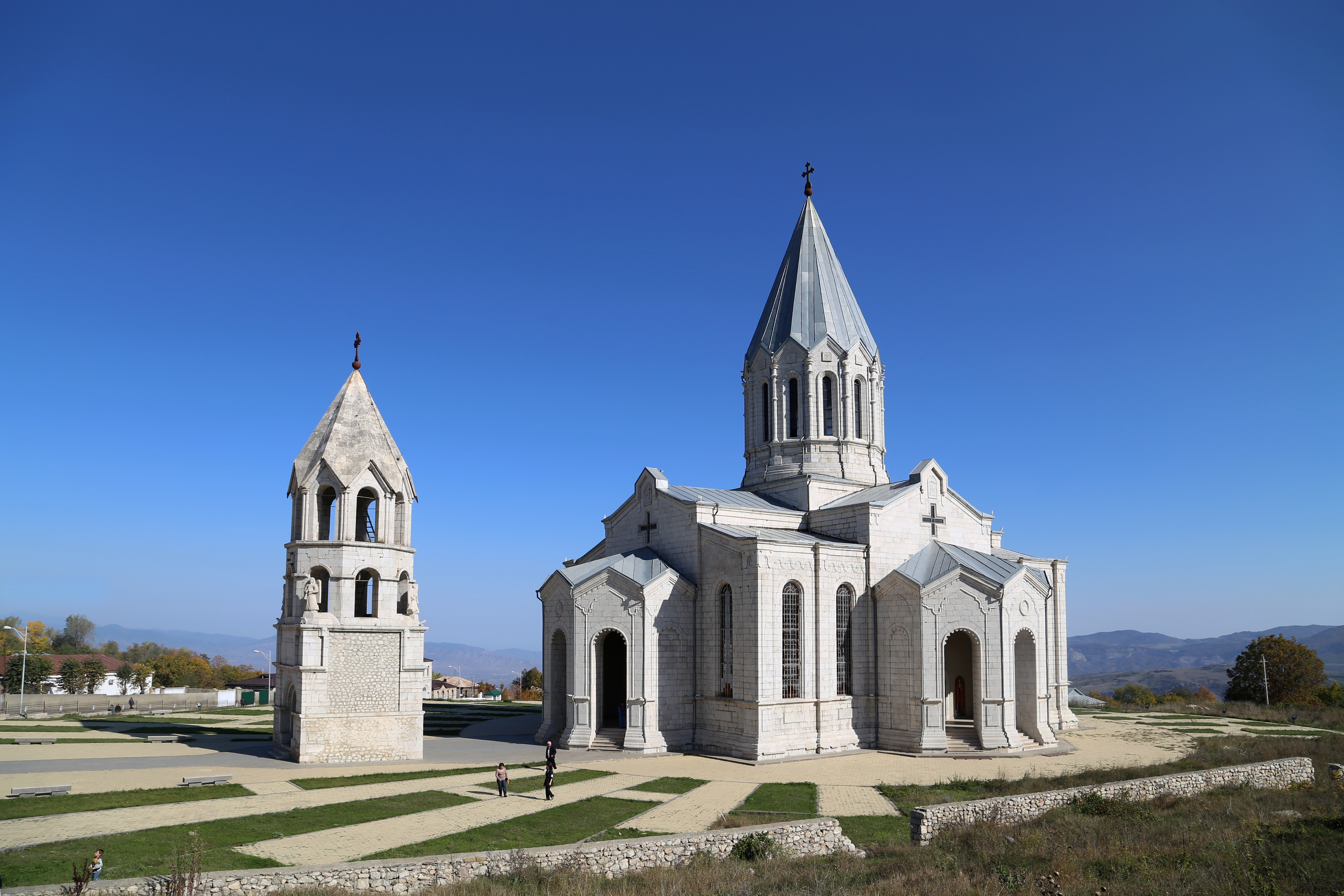
- Ghazanchetsots Cathedral, the seat of the bishop

Location
- Country: Azerbaijan

Statistics
- Population: Total: (as of 2015); ~150,000
- Churches: 17 (functioning); ~5,000 (all)

Information
- Denomination: Armenian Apostolic Church
- Rite: Armenian Rite
- Established: 1989
- Cathedral: Ghazanchetsots, Shusha (Shushi); Gandzasar (historic)
- Secular priests: 10

Current leadership
- Patriarch: Karekin II
- Primate: Bishop Vrtanes Abrahamyan

Website
- artsakhdiocese.am

The Diocese of Artsakh (Armenian: Արցախի թեմ, romanized: Artsakhi t'em) is one of the largest dioceses of the Armenian Apostolic Church in Nagorno-Karabakh. It is named after the historic province of Artsakh; the 10th province of the Kingdom of Armenia. The diocesan headquarters are located on Ghazanchetots street 72, in the town of Shushi. The seat of the bishop is the Ghazanchetsots Cathedral. On 21 January 2022, Vrtanes Abrahamyan was appointed Primate of the Diocese.

== History ==
The diocese was established in 1989. Since its creation, archbishop Pargev Martirosyan (Պարգև արքեպիսկոպոս Մարտիրոսյան) has served as its primate.

All churches in Nagorno-Karabakh were closed in the 1930s by the Soviet government. The totalitarian regime was relatively relaxed by Mikhail Gorbachev. A mass movement for the unification of Nagorno-Karabakh with Armenia started in February 1988. With Armenian national identity on the rise in the Soviet Union, the Diocese of Artsakh was established in 1989. The 13th century Gandzasar monastery was the first one to be reopened. It remains the historic center of the Diocese of Artsakh, while the Ghazanchetsots Cathedral is the administrative center of the diocese.

The construction of the Holy Mother of God Cathedral in Stepanakert was launched on July 19, 2006. The cost of the project is around US$2 million, and the architect of the church is Gagik Yeranosyan. However, the construction process was slow due to the lack of financial resources. Upon its consecration, it will become the seat of the Diocese of Artsakh.

After the First Nagorno-Karabakh War, renewing the conflict in 2016, and later in 2020, by the Second Nagorno-Karabakh War, in 2022, and later in 2023 by the Azerbaijani offensive in Nagorno-Karabakh, incidents led to various incidents of hatred and use of the force and ethnic cleansing against Armenians and damage, rewriting the history and destruction or conversion of Armenian cultural heritage by Armenian military forces. Churches of the Diocese of Artsakh were often occupied, damaged, or destroyed, or converted to "Caucasus Albanian" churches. After the war in 2020 there were around 400 holy sites in the area and some of them were desecrated or destroyed when Azerbaijan got the territory. European commission criticized Azerbaijan's policy of erasing and denying the Armenian cultural heritage and adopted the resolution 2022/2582(RSP). Conflict in 2023 lead to massive exodus of Armenians from the area.

== Active churches ==
Here is the list of churches, monasteries, and chapels functioning under the jurisdiction of the Diocese of Artsakh, along with their location and year of consecration:

=== Churches ===
- Askeran region
  - Holy Mother of God church, Askeran City, 2002
  - Holy Mother of God church, Aygestan, 1850
  - St. George church, Astghashen, 1898
  - Holy Mother of God church, Dashushen, 1843
  - St. John the Baptist church, Lusadzor, 19th century
  - St. Stephen church, Khachen, 13th century
  - Holy Mother of God church, Khnatsakh, 19th century
  - Holy Mother of God church, Karmir Gyugh, 1841
  - Holy Mother of God church, Madatashen, 19-20th centuries
  - Holy Mother of God church, Nakhijevanik, 19th century
  - St. Stephen church, Badara/Patara, 19th century
  - St. George church, Sarnakhbyur, 1875
  - "Phirumashen" church, Sarushen, 12-13th century
- Martakert region
  - Vankasar Church, near Martakert, 7th century
  - Saint John the Baptist Church, Martakert City, 1881
  - St. Anthony church, Zaglik, 2007
  - St. Sarkis church, Harutyunagomer, 2005
  - Saint George's Church, Mets Shen, 2011
  - Church in the settlement of "Mandur", Mehmana, 12th–15th centuries
  - Holy Mother of God church, Mehmana, 1229
  - Holy Mother of God church, Nerkin Horatagh, 1904–1914
  - St. George church, Nerkin Oratakh, 2012
  - Holy Mother of God church, Vaghuhas, 2012
  - St. George church, Haterk
  - Holy Mother of God church, Tonashen, 19th century
- Martuni region
  - Church of St. Nerses the Great, Martuni, 2004
  - Holy Mother of God church, Ashan, 1896
  - Holy Mother of God church, Avdur, 1874
  - Holy Mother of God church, Tsovategh, 19th century
  - "Targmanchants vank" church, Kaghartsi, 19th century
  - Holy Mother of God church, Kolkhozashen, 19th century
  - Holy Mother of God church, Haghorti, 1751
  - St. Gregory church, Chartar City, 19th century
  - St. Vardan church, Chartar City, 2018
  - Holy Mother of God church, Nngi, 1853
  - Holy Mother of God church, Nngi, 1895
  - St. Gregory the Illuminator, Nngi
  - St. John the Baptist church, Norshen, 19th century
  - Holy All-Savior church, Spitakashen, 13th century
- Shahumyan region - most of churches is on the territory occupied by Azerbaijan
  - St. Dadi church, 1178
  - St. Nshan Katoghike church, 1174
  - Domed small church of St. Gregory the Illuminator, 1211–1224
  - Holy Mother of God church, 17th century
- Shushi region
  - St. Sarkis church, Yeghtsahogh, 2006
  - St. Pantaleon church, Mets Shen, 1658
  - Saint John the Baptist Church (Kanach Zham), Shusha, 1818, not operating, territory occupied by Azerbaijan
  - Ghazanchetsots Holy Savior Cathedral, Shusha, 1888, not operating, territory occupied by Azerbaijan
- Stepanakert
  - Cathedral of the Holy Mother of God, Stepanakert, 2019
  - Saint Jacob Church, Stepanakert, 2007
- Kashatagh region - territory occupied by Azerbaijan
- Hadrut region - terriroty occupied by Azerbaijan
  - Holy Resurrection Church, Hadrut, 1621, not operating, terriroty occupied by Azerbaijan
- Other
  - Church of the Holy Ascension, Lachin, 1998
  - Church of the Holy Martyrs, Zabux, 2002
  - Saint George's Church, Aşağı Oratağ, 2012
  - Saint John the Baptist Church, Daşbaşı, 2013
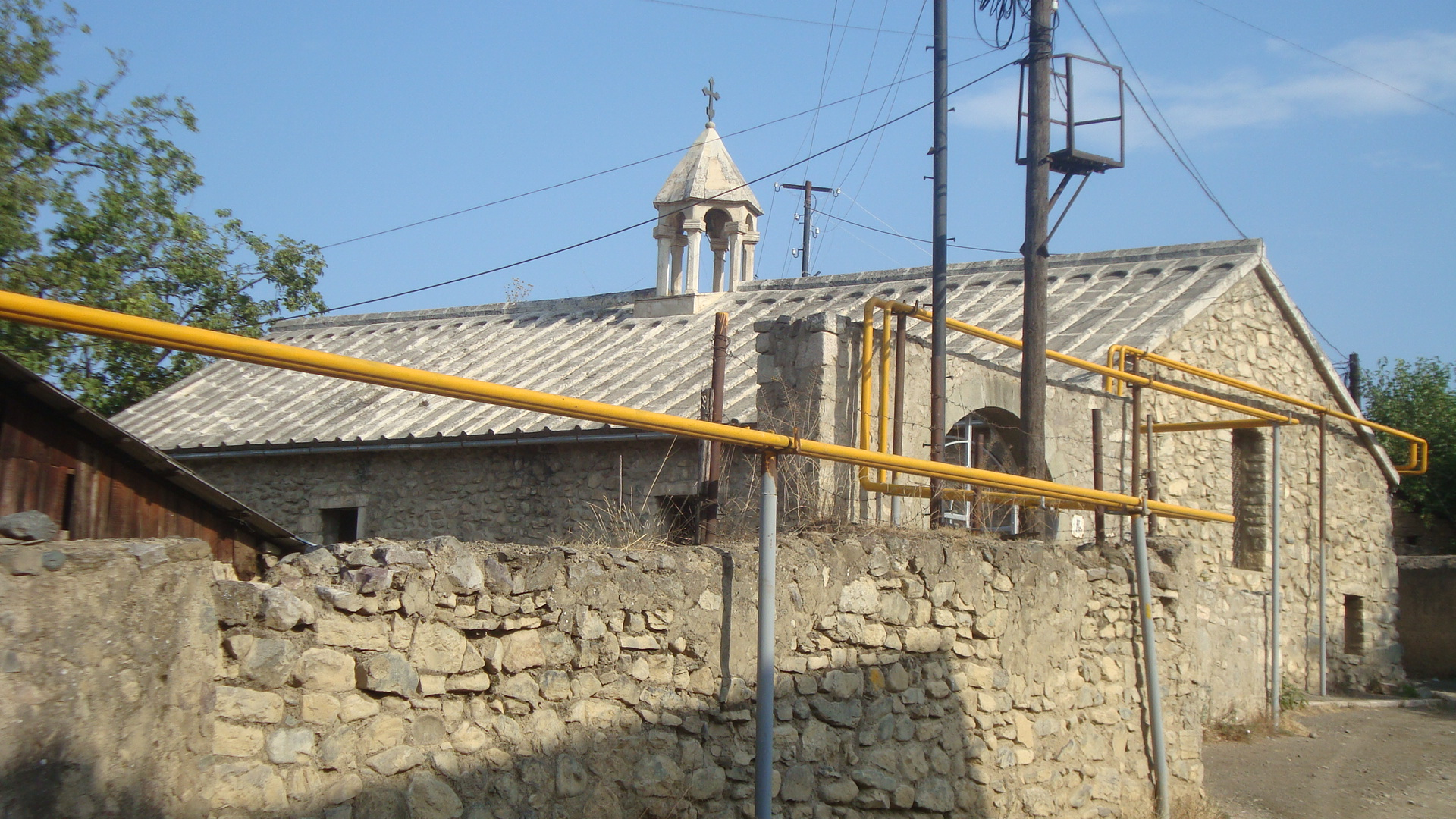
Holly Resurrection Church, Hadrut, 1621

Saint John the Baptist Church (Kanach Zham), Shusha, 1818

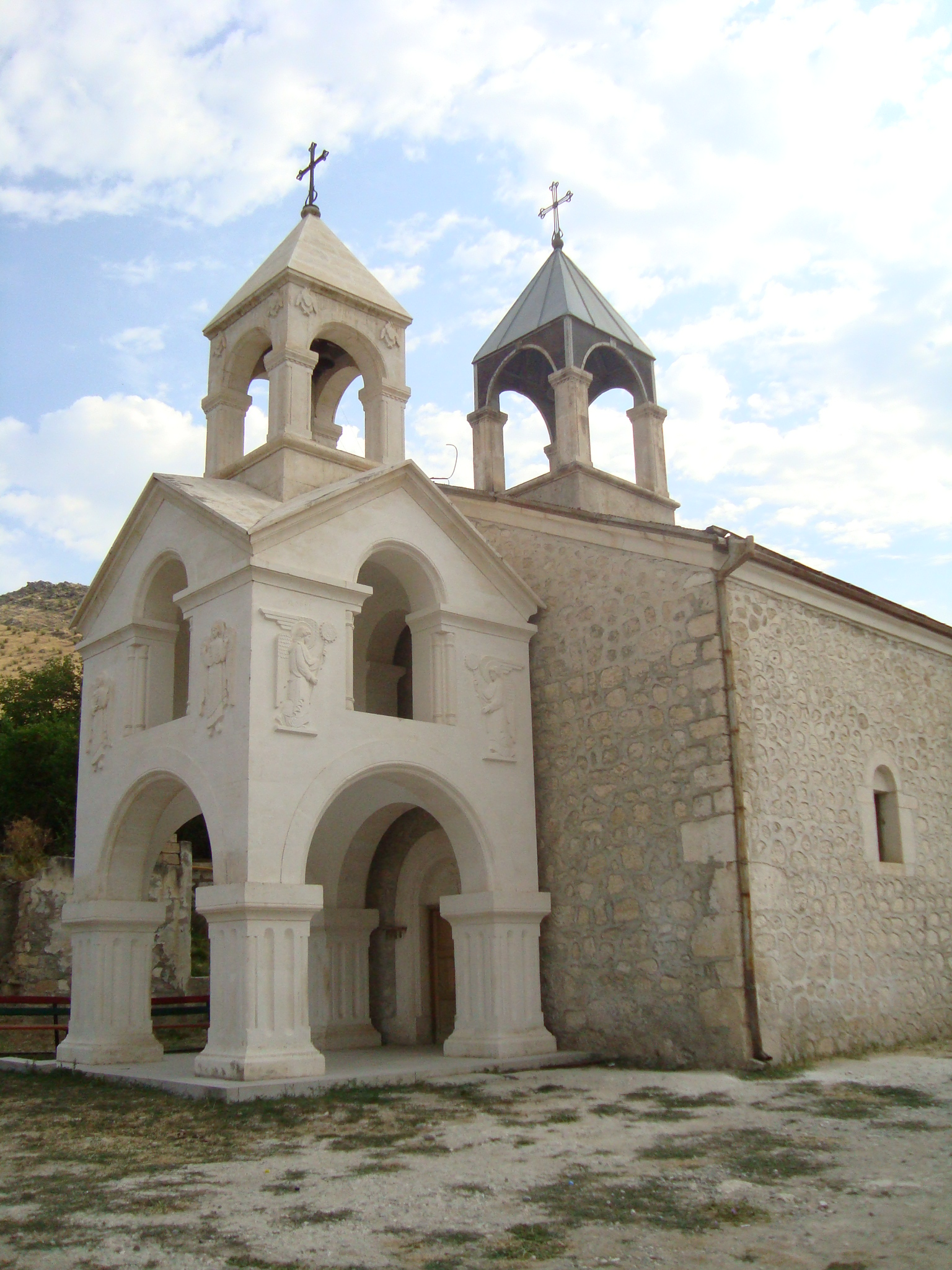
Saint John the Baptist Church, Martakert, 1881

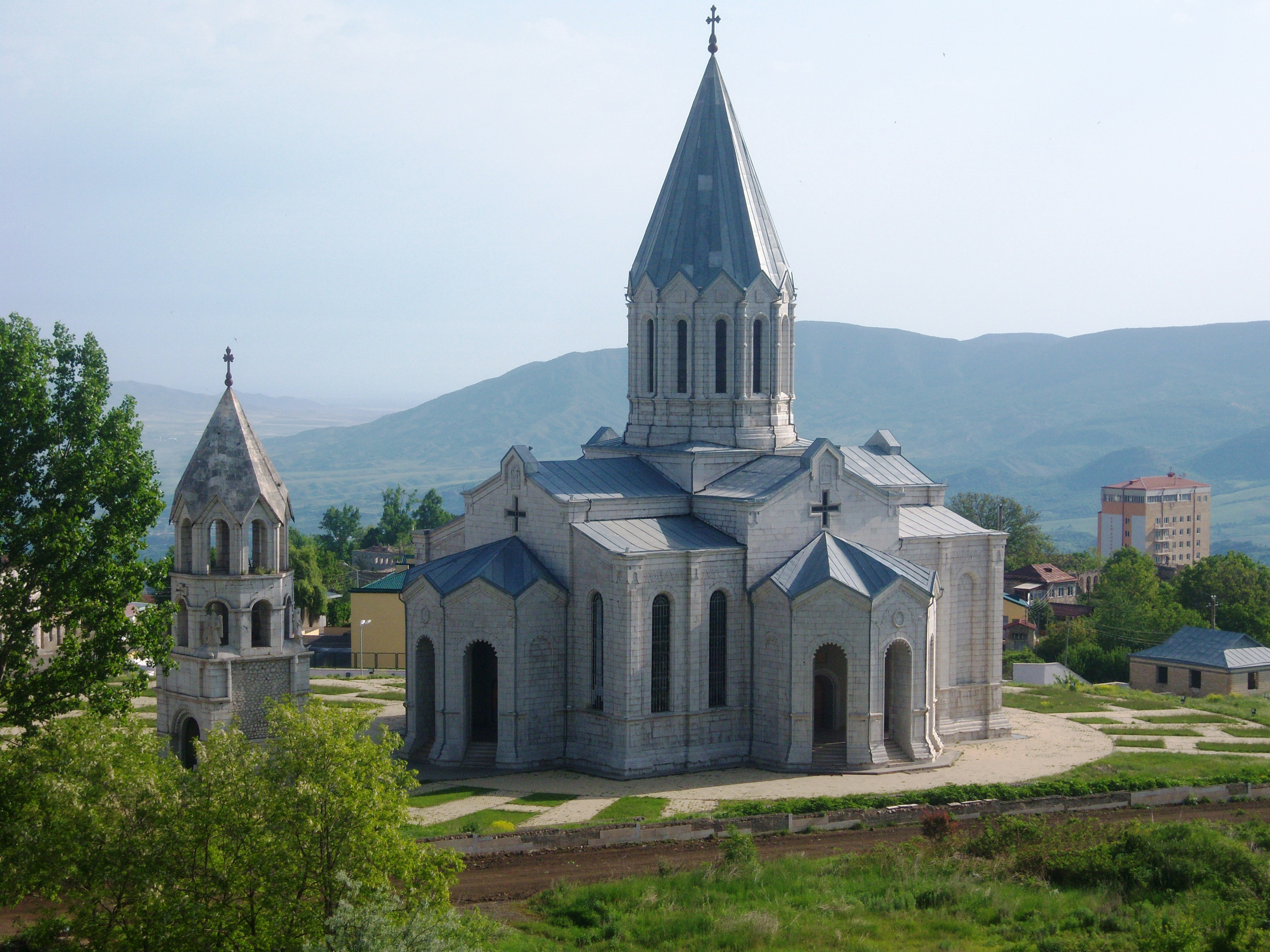
Ghazanchetsots Holy Savior Cathedral, Shusha, 1888

Church of the Holy Resurrection, Lachin, 1998

=== Monasteries ===
- Amaras Monastery, Sos, 4th-19th centuries
- Tsitsernavank Monastery, Tsitsernavank, 5-6th centuries
- "Metsaranits" monastery, called also "Hakobavank" monastery complex, Qolatak/Kolatak, Martakert region, 7-13th centuries
- Gandzasar monastery complex, Vank, Martakert region, 10-13th centuries
- "Dadivank" monastery complex, Dadivank, Shahumyan region, 12th-13th centuries
- "Shoshkavank" monastery complex, Msmna, Martuni region, 16th century
- "Gyulistani anapat" monastery complex, called also Monastery of the Holy All-Savior church, Tonashen, Martakert region, 17th century
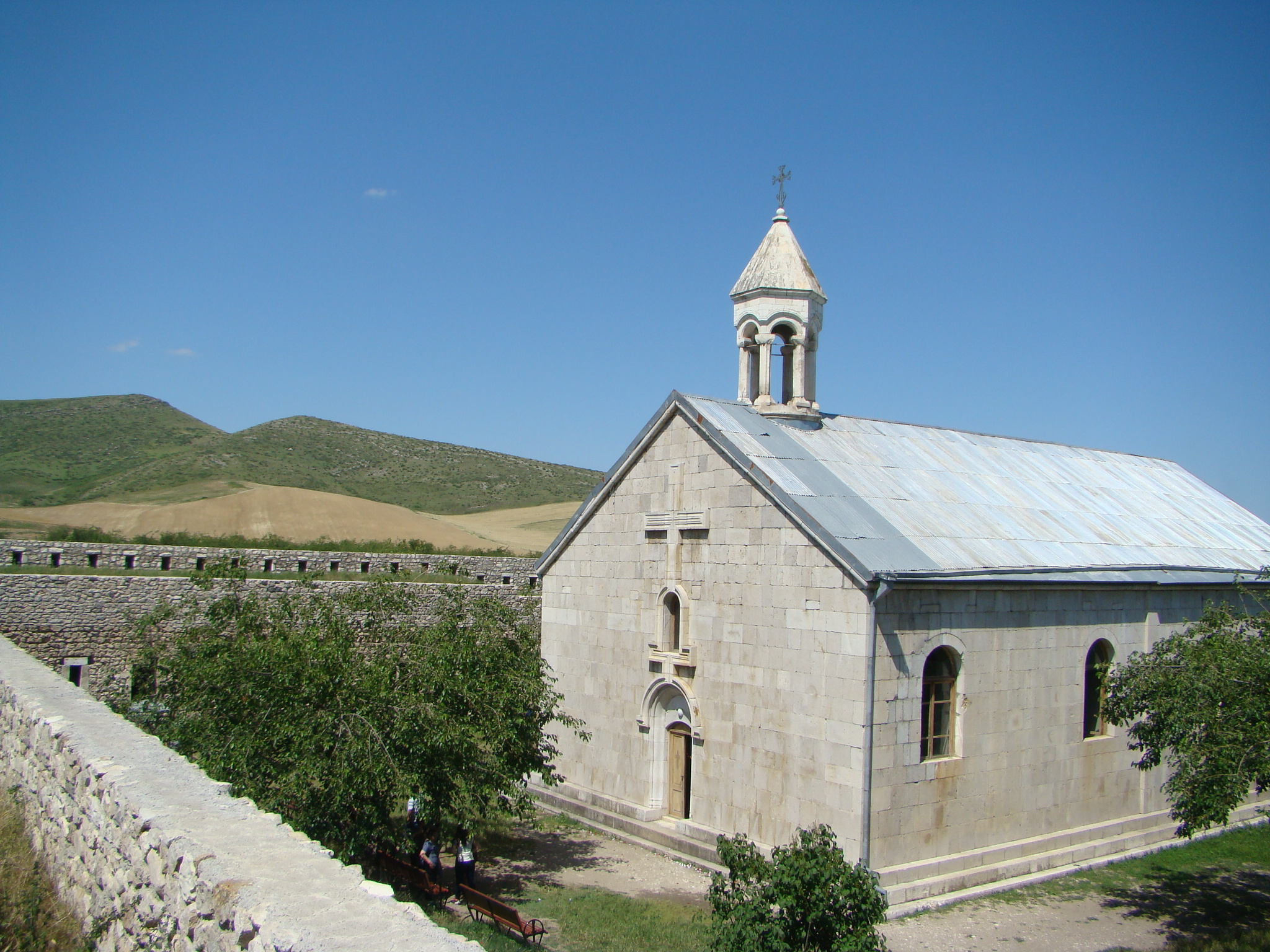
Amaras Monastery, Sos, 4th century

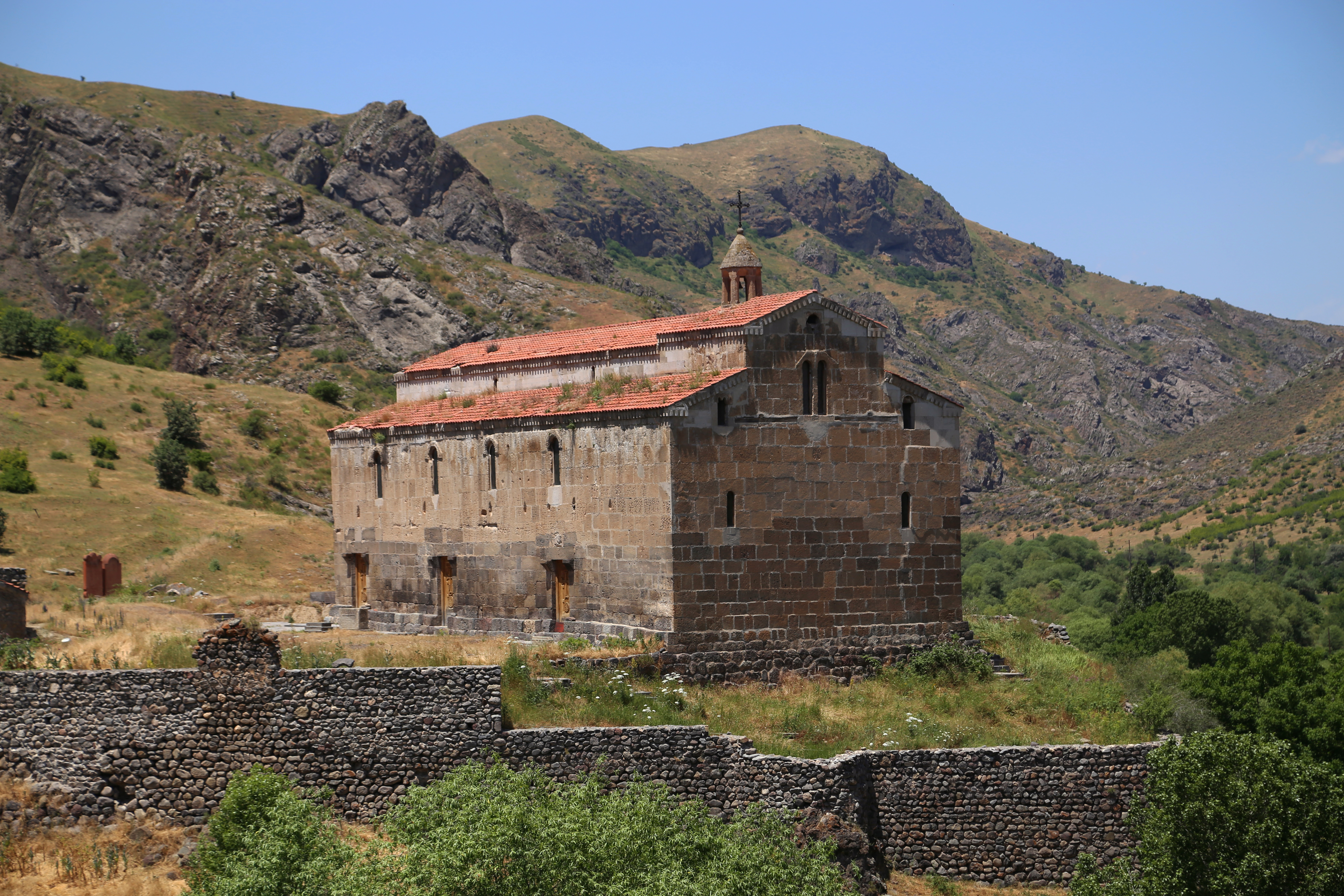
Tsitsernavank Monastery, Tsitsernavank, 5-6th centuries

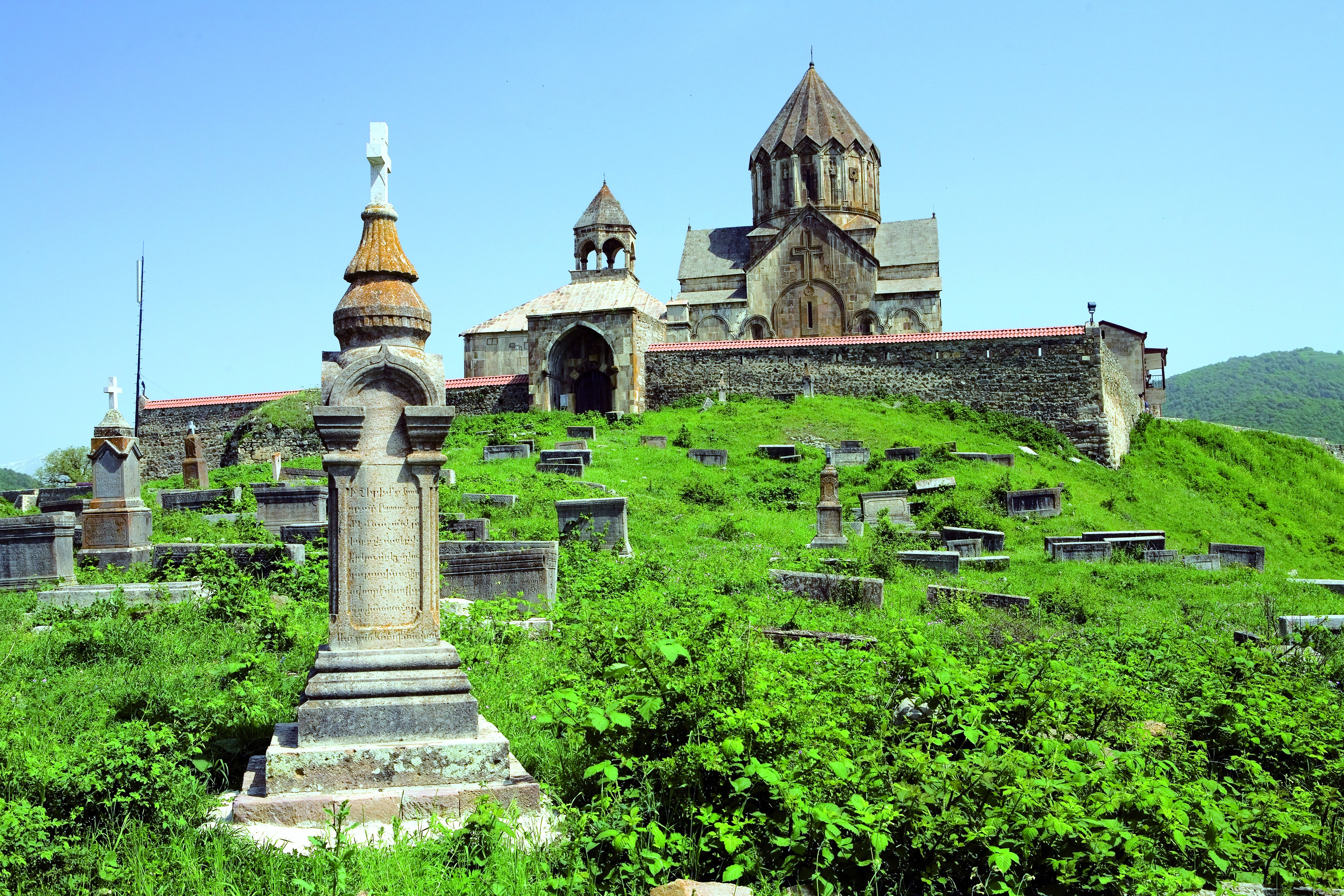
Gandzasar monastery, Vank, 10-13th centuries

== Inactive/ruined churches and monasteries ==
This is an incomplete list of inactive or ruined churches and monasteries in the territory regulated by the Diocese of Artsakh:

- Katarovank Monastery, Hadrut Region, 4th century
- Yeghishe Arakyal Monastery, Martakert Region, 5th century
- Dadivank Monastery, Shahumyan Region, 9-13th centuries
- Gtichavank Monastery, Togh, 1248
- Monastery of Tsar, Tsar, 1301
- Yerits Mankants Monastery, Martakert Region, 1691
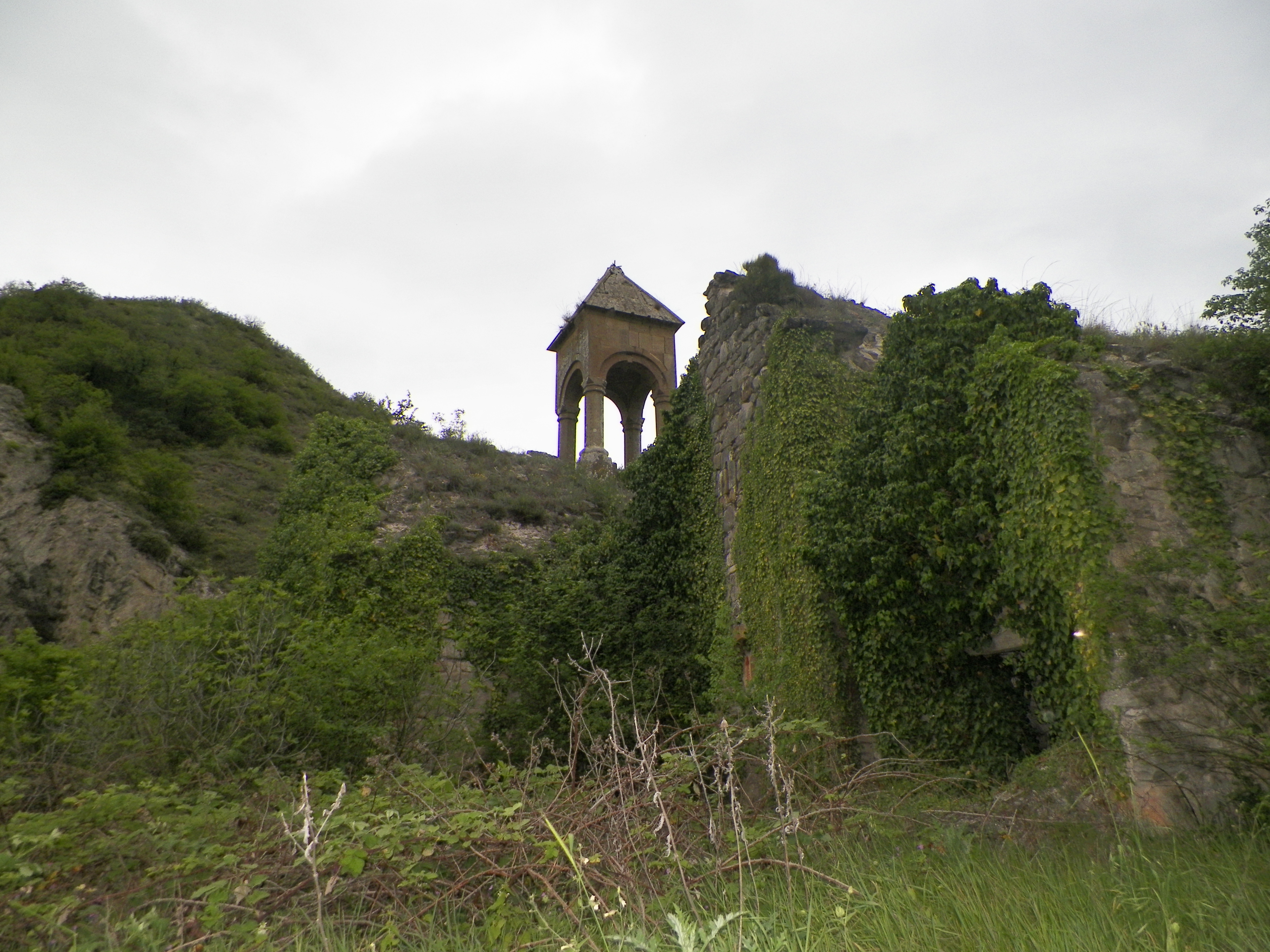
Yeghishe Arakyal Monastery, Martakert Region, 5th century

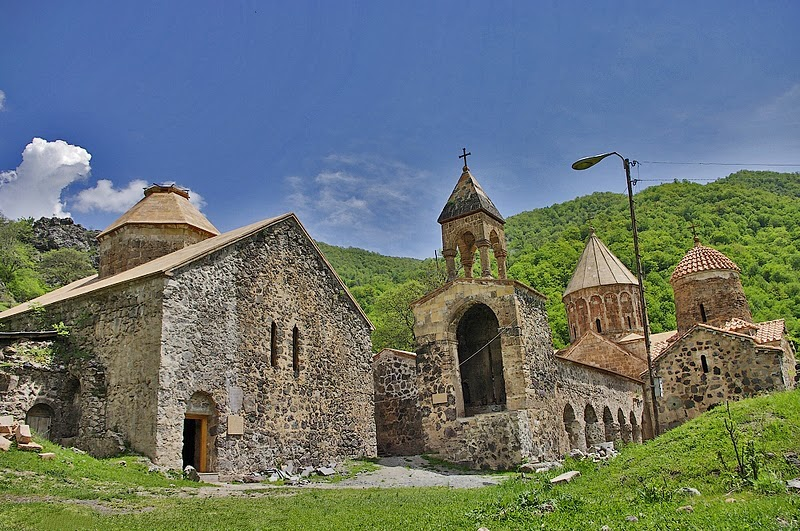
Dadivank Monastery, Shahumyan Region, 9-13th centuries

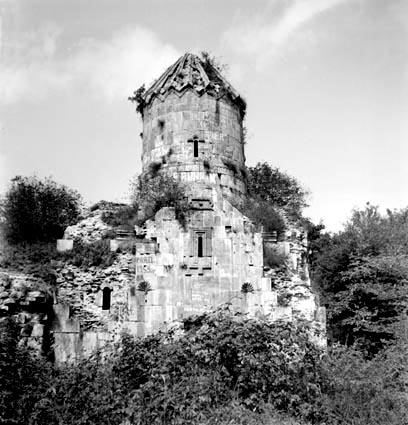
Gtichavank Monastery, Togh, 1248

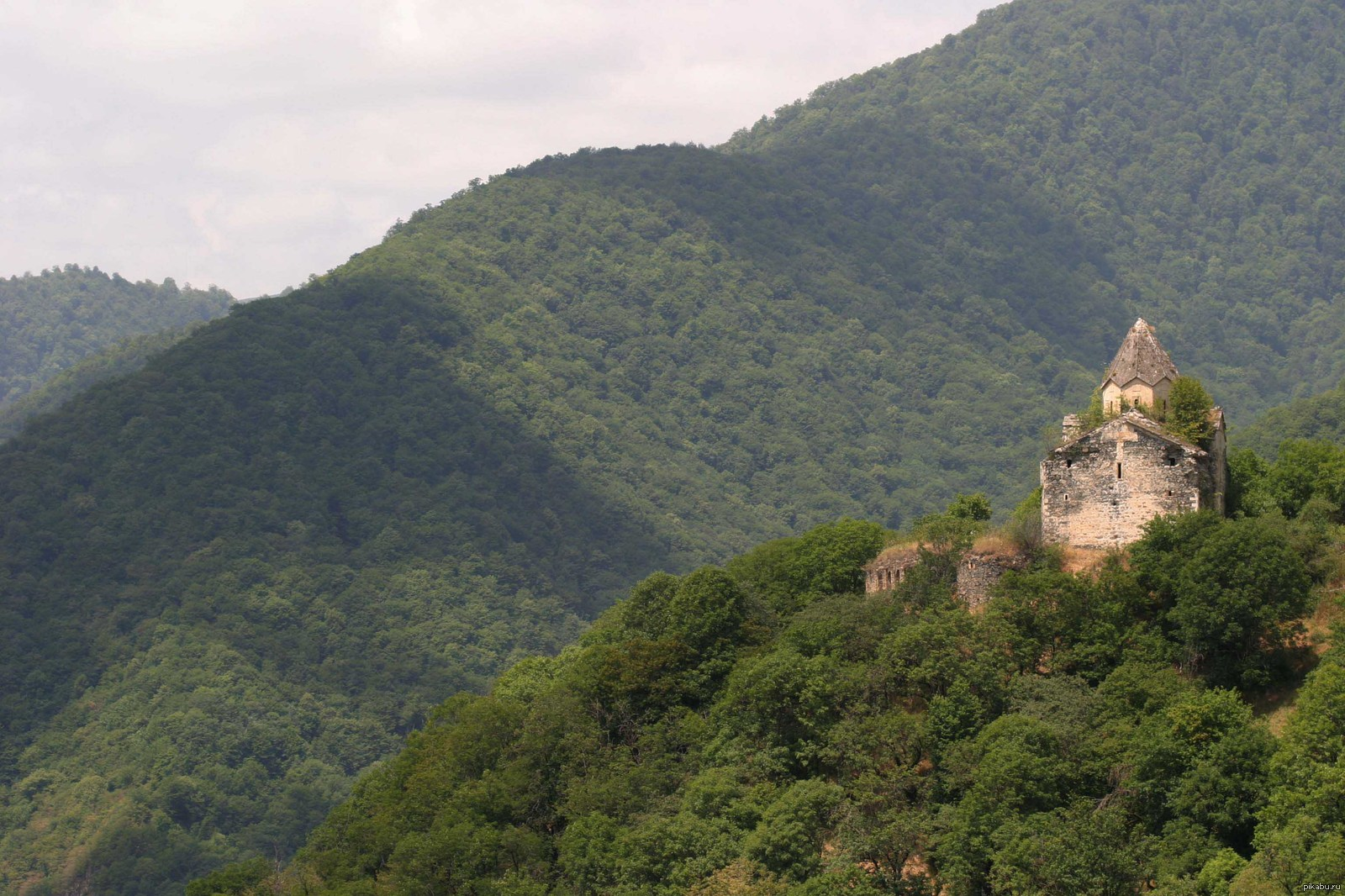
Yerits Mankants Monastery, Martakert Region, 1691

== List of Churches and Monasteries ==
Below is list of churches, monasteries, and chapels under the jurisdiction of the Diocese of Artsakh and their operating status from Askeran, Hadrut, Kashatagh, Martakert, Martuni, Shahumyan, Shushi regions and Stepanakert.

=== Askeran region ===
Churches and monasteries of the Diocese of Artsakh - Askeran region
Name	Type	Image	Year	Location/geo	Status	Notes
Holy Mother of God church	Church		2002	Askeran City, 39°56′35″N 46°50′06″E	Operating	
Holy Mother of God church	Church		1850	Aygestan	Operating	
St. Vanes church	Church		18th century	Aygestan	Ruined	
St. George church	Church		1898	Astghashen	Operating	
Holy Mother of God church	Church		1651	Avetaranots / Chanakhchi	Occupied	
"Cuckoo's nest" church	Church		12th-13th centuries	Avetaranots / Chanakhchi	Occupied	
"Holy sister's convent" church	Monastery		1616	Avetaranots / Chanakhchi, Kusanats Anapat Armenian Monastery	Occupied	
"Ghevondants' desert" church	Church			Avetaranots / Chanakhchi	Occupied	
"Sana eghtse" church	Church		17th century	Avetaranots / Chanakhchi	Occupied	
Church in the settlement of "Phaphader"	Church		12th-13th centuries	Avetaranots / Chanakhchi	Occupied	
Holy Mother of God church	Church		1862	Dahraz	Occupied	
Holy Mother of God church	Church		1843	Dashushen	Operating	
Church in the settlement of "Bozun tap"	Church		11th-13th centuries	Dashushen	Ruined	
Church in the settlement of "Mkhoz"	Church		15th-17th centuries	Dashushen	Ruined	
St. John the Baptist church	Church		19th century	Lusadzor	Operating	
St. John the Baptist church	Church		13th century	Khantsk	Ruined	
St. Stephen church	Church		1673	Khantsk	Ruined	
"Vardapetin khut" church	Church		11th-12th centuries	Khantsk	Ruined	
St. Stephen church	Church		13th century	Khachen, 39°59′09″N 46°41′50″E	Occupied	
Church in the settlement of "Eghunts eghtsi"	Church		1204	Khachen	Ruined	
"Machi shen" church	Church		1245	Khachen	Ruined	
Church in the settlement of "Sheganots"	Church		11th-13th centuries	Khachen	Ruined	
Church in the settlement of "Khurda Gyune"	Church		11th-13th centuries	Khachen	Ruined	
Holy Mother of God church	Church		19th century	Khnatsakh	Operating	
Holy Mother of God church	Church		17th century	Khnatsakh	Ruined	
Church in the sanctuary of "Parur"	Church		16th-17th century	Khnatsakh	Ruined	
?	Church			Khnapat	Closed	
"Jukhtak eghtsi" church	Church		11th-13th centuries	Khndzristan	Ruined	
?	khachar		1297-1800	Khramort	Ruined	khachkar
Holy Mother of God church	Church		1800-1876	Khramort	Ruined	
"Vaka" church	Church		11th-12th centuries	Tsaghkashat	Ruined	
?	Khachar		9th-13th centuries	Tsaghkashat	Ruined	cemetery with many khachars
Holy Mother of God church	Church		1841	Karmir	Operating	
"Aghen nahatak" or "Khachin tak" church	Church		12th-13th centuries	Karmir	Ruined	
Holy Mother of God church	Church		19th century	Harav	Ruined	
Holy Mother of God church	Church		19th-20th centuries	Madatashen	Operating	
Holy Mother of God church	Church		19th century	Moshkhmhat	Occupied	
"Ghevondants" monastery or "Kondik"	Monastery cell		5th-6th centuries	Moshkhmhat	Occupied	
Holy Mother of God church	Church		17th-18th centuries	Mkhitarashen	Ruined	
Holy Mother of God church	Church		19th century	Nakhijevanik	Operating	
St. George church	Church		1810	Noragyukh	Ruined	
"Tigranakert" church	Church		5th-7th centuries	Nor Maragha	Occupied	
"White cross" church	Church		5th century	Nor Maragha	Occupied	
Holy Mother of God church	Church		1849	Nerkin Sznek	Closed	
Holy Mother of God church	Church		1918	Shosh	Closed	
"Buduru"	Holy place, khachkar		11th-13th centuries	Shosh	Ruined	
Church in the settlement of "Shaghot"	Church		11th-13th centuries	Shosh	Ruined	
St. Stephen church	Church		1655	Shosh	Ruined	
St. Stephen church	Church		19th century	Badara	Operating	
Holy All-Savior church	Church		13th century	Badara	Ruined	
"Darpasut eghtsi" church	Church		9th-14th centuries	Badara	Ruined	
"Khravand" church	Church		13th century	Badara	Ruined	
"Tsera nahatak" church	Church		9th-13th centuries	Badara	Ruined	
"Jukhtak eghtsi" church	Church		12th-13th centuries	Badara	Ruined	
Seven churches' monastery	Monastery		12th-13th centuries	Badara	Ruined	
"Otskan" church	Church		13th century	Badara	Ruined	
Holy Mother of God church	Church		1888	Jraghatsner	Occupied	
"Bununts dzori eghtsi" church	Church		12th-13th centuries	Jraghatsner	Occupied	
St. Vanes church	Church		17th-19th centuries	Jraghatsner	Occupied	
St. Stephen church	Church		1894	Rev	Closed	
Holy Mother of God church	Church		18th century	Sghnakh	Occupied	
St. George church	Church		1875	Sarnakhbyur	Operating	
Church in the settlement of "Nor Shen"	Church		17th century	Sardarashen	Ruined	
Holy All-Savior church	Church		19th century	Sarushen	Closed	
«Phirumashen» church (XII-XIII)	Church		12th-13th centuries	Sarushen	Operating	
St. Jakob church	Church		1885	Verin Sznek	Closed	
"Eghtsadzori eghtsi" church	Church		17th-18th centuries	Verin Sznek	Ruined	
Holy Mother of God church	Church		19th century	Vardadzor	Ruined	
Church in the sanctuary of "Chaghmakhsar"	Church		19th century	Vardadzor	Ruined	
Holy Mother of God church	Church		18th century	Varazabun	Ruined	
"Ptkes Berk" or "St. George" monastery	Monastery		17th century	Ulubab	Closed	
Holy Mother of God church	Church		19th century	Qyatuk	Ruined	
Holy Mother of God church	Church		19th century	Qrasni	Ruined	
"Jam" church (XIII-XVII)	Church		13th-17th centuries	Qrasni	Ruined	

=== Hadrut region ===
Churches and monasteries of the Diocese of Artsakh - Hadrut region
Name	Type	Image	Year	Location/geo	Status	Notes
Holy Mother of God church	Church		13th century	Hadrut city	Occupied	
Holy Resurrection church	Church		1621	Hadrut city	Occupied	
Holy Resurrection church	Church		1741	Aygestan	Occupied, Ruined	
Holy Mother of God church	Church		1902-1907	Araqel, 39°26′31″N 46°59′45″E	Occupied, Ruined	
Holy Mother of God church	Church		19th century	Araqel, Mylkudara locality, 39°28′28″N 46°55′55″E	Occupied, Ruined	
Holy Mother of God church	Church		19th century	Arevshat, 39°26′49″N 46°49′42″E	Occupied	
"Egtsundzor" church	Church		11th-13th centuries	Arpagetik	Occupied	
Holy Mother of God church	Church		19th century	Aknaghbyur	Occupied	
"Gharali" church	Church		17th-18th centuries	Aknaghbyur	Occupied	
Holy Mother of God church	Church		17th century	Banadzor	Occupied, Ruined	
Church in the sunctuary of "Kakhan"	Church		13th-14th centuries	Drakhtik	Occupied	
Church of The Gregory of Narek or Narekavank	Church		1645	Drakhtik	Occupied, Ruined	
"Taghaseri anapat" church	Monastery		1635	Taghaser	Occupied, Ruined	
Holy Mother of God church	Church		17th century	west of Taghaser	Occupied	
St. John the Baptist church	Church		1896	Taghut	Occupied	
"Katarovank" monastery complex or "Holy Mother of God"	Monastery		5th century	Khandzadzor	Occupied	
St. John the Baptist church or Holy Mother of God church	Church		19th century	Khandzadzor	Occupied	
"Eghtsun dzor" church	Church		16th-17th centuries	Khtsaberd, Hartagomer	Occupied, Ruined	
"Ptkataghi vank" church	Monastery		1670	Tsakuri	Occupied, Ruined	
Holy Mother of God church or "Tsaghkavank"	Church		1682	Tsakuri	Occupied	
Holy Mother of God church	Church		19th century	Tsaghkavank	Occupied	
Holy Mother of God church	Church		1696	Tsamdzor	Occupied	
Holy All-Savior church	Church		19th century	Karmrakuch	Occupied	
Holy Mother of God church	Church		1621	Hakaku	Occupied	
Holy All-Savior church	Church		19th century	Hin Tagher	Occupied	
"Hogher" church	Church		18th century	Hogher	Occupied	
St. Minas' church	Church		1601	Mariamadzor	Occupied, Ruined	
Holy Resurrection church	Church		1889	Meliqashen	Occupied	
Church in the settlement of "Eghtsu art"	Church		13th-14th centuries	Mets Tagher, Eghtsu art	Occupied	
Church in the settlement of "Markhatun"	Church		1603	Mets Tagher, Markhatun	Occupied	
Holy All-Savior church	Church		1846	Mets Tagher	Occupied	
St. Sarkis church	Church		1840	Mokhrenes	Occupied, Ruined	, destroyed between March and July 2022
Seven gates monastery	Monastery		6th-7th centuries	Mokhrenes	Occupied	
Seven gates church	Church		9th-10th centuries	Mokhrenes	Occupied, Ruined	
"Hin Norashen" church	Church		1892	Norashen	Occupied	
Holy Mother of God church	Church		1692	Ukhtadzor	Occupied	
St. Stephen church	Church		1651	Pletants	Occupied	
Holy Mother of God church	Church		19th century	Jraberd	Occupied	
"Kaqavavanq" monastery	Monastery		end of the 18th century, 1742	Jrakus	Occupied	
St. Stephen church	Church		1698	Jrakus	Occupied	
"Shakhkakh" monastery	Monastery		17th century, 1865	Sarinshen	Occupied	
Holy Mother of God church	Church		19th century	Sarinshen	Occupied	
"White cross" monastery complex or "St. Cross"	Monastery		13th-17th centuries	Vank	Occupied	
St. Hripsime church	Church		17th century	Vardashat	Occupied	
St. Mesrop church	Church		19th century	Tyak	Occupied	
"Desert" church	Church		19th century	Togh	Occupied	
St. John the Baptist church	Church		1736	Togh	Occupied	
"Tej" church	Church		13th century	Togh	Occupied	
St. Stephen church	Church		1747	Togh	Occupied	
"Gtchavank" monastery complex or Gtich monastery	Monastery		9th-18th centuries	Togh	Occupied	
Kavaqavank	Monastery		14th century	Togh	Occupied	, damaged during the 44 day war
Church in the settlement of "Gergech"	Church		13th-14th centuries	Tumi	Occupied	
"King's grave" church	Church		12th-13th centuries	Tumi	Occupied	
"Red cross" church	Church		1000	Tumi	Occupied, Ruined	
St. John the Baptist	Church		17th century	Tumi	Occupied	
"Khuty dre" monastery complex	Monastery		9th-13th centuries	Tumi	Occupied	
Holy All-Savior church	Church		17th-18th centuries	Tsor	Occupied	
"Desert of St. Gregory the Illuminator" church	Church		13th century	Tsor	Occupied	
Holy Mother of God church	Church		19th century	Qaraglukh / Karaglukh	Occupied	
St. John the Baptist church	Church		2013	Qaraglukh / Karaglukh	Occupied	
Holy Mother of God church	Church		1743	Qyuratagh / Kyuratagh	Occupied	

=== Kashatagh region ===
Churches and monasteries of the Diocese of Artsakh - Kashatagh region
Name	Type	Image	Year	Location/geo	Status	Notes
Church of the Ascension	Church		1996-1998	Berdzor	Occupied	
Church of Holy Martryrs	Church		2002	Aghavno	Occupied	
Holy Mother of God church	Church		17th century	Hak, Aghbatkhert settlement	Occupied	
"Mayreji vank" monastery complex	Monastery		11th-12th centuries	Aghbradzor (Mayrajur)	Occupied, Ruined	
"Amutegh" church	Church		17th-18th centuries	Amutegh	Occupied	
St. Vardan church	Church		17th century	Amutegh	Occupied	
Andokaberd church	Church		11th-13th centuries	Andokaberd	Occupied	
Church in the settlement of "Arakhish"	Church		12th-13th centuries	Arakhish	Occupied, Ruined	
"Zorakhach" church	Church		16th-17th centuries	Arakhish	Occupied, Ruined	
"Katosavank" monastery	Monastery		9th-11th centuries	Arvakan, Katos	Occupied, Ruined	
Church in the old cemetery	Church		13th-17th centuries	Artashav	Occupied, Ruined	
Ruined church, near the Barkushat fortress	Church		-	Barkushat, on the right bank of the Vorotan	Occupied, Ruined	
"Qronq" monastery complex	Monastery		13th-14th centuries	Tsaghkaberd	Occupied	
"Tsitsernavank" monastery complex	Monastery		4th-17th centuries	Tsitsernavank	Occupied	
St. George church	Church		4th-5th century	Tsitsernavank	Occupied	
"Tandzatap" church	Church		19th century	Keren	Occupied	
Church in the cemetery of "Akbatkhert"	Church		13th-15th centuries	Hak	Occupied	
Holy Mother of God church	Church		1419	Hak	Occupied	
St. Minas church	Church		1675	Hak	Occupied	
"Amutegh" church	Church		17th-18th centuries	Hakari	Occupied	
St. Stephen church	Church		15th-16th centuries	Harar	Occupied, Ruined	
St. George church	Church		17th century	Herik	Occupied	
"Anapat" monastery complex	Monastery		12th-13th centuries	Hochants	Occupied	
St. Stephen church	Church		17th century	Hochants	Occupied	
"Chapkut" church	Church		1641	Chapkut	Occupied	
"Mazra" church	Church		1694	Vanand (Mazra)	Occupied	
"Zirik" church	Church		10th-14th centuries	Meliqashen	Occupied	
Holy Mother of God church	Church		1682	Mirik	Occupied	
"Varazgom" church	Church		9th-11th centuries	Moshatagh, Varazgom settlement 39°41′50″N 46°21′33″E	Occupied	
Poghos-Petros church	Church		17th century	Shalua	Occupied	
?	Church		17th century	Janbar	Occupied	
Church in the cemetery	Church		9th-11th centuries	Sonasar	Occupied	
Church in the fortress of "Spitakajur"	Church		9th-13th centuries	Spitakajur	Occupied	
?	Church		15th-16th centuries	Vazgenashen	Occupied	
?	Church		17th century	Vakunis	Occupied	
"Mazra" church	Church		1694	Vanand	Occupied	
Church in the settlement of "Jayrapor"	Church		14th-15th centuries	Tandzut	Occupied	
"Tandzut" church	Church		late Middle Ages	Tandzut	Occupied	
First "Stunis" church	Church		17th century	Tandzut	Occupied	
Second "Stunis" church	Church		9th-11th centuries	Tandzut	Occupied	
"Mknatami khach" monastery	Monastery		12th-13th centuries	Tandzut	Occupied	
"Masrik" church	Church		1694	Qashuniq / Kashunik	Occupied	

=== Martakert region ===
Churches and monasteries of the Diocese of Artsakh - Martakert region
Name	Type	Image	Year	Location/geo	Status	Notes
Vankasar Church	Church		7th century	near Martakert, 40°04′20″N 46°53′15″E	Operating	
St. John the Baptist church	Church		19th century	Martakert city	Operating	
Holy Mother of God church	Church		1668	Arajadzor	Ruined	
"Harva Jayrapor" church	Church		1249	Arajadzor	Ruined	
Holy Mother of God church	Church		9th-11th centuries	Garnaqar, 3 km northwest of the village	Ruined	
?	Church		11th-13th centuries	Garnaqar, 3 km northwest of the village	Ruined	
"Hamami" church	Church		9th century	Garnaqar, 4 km west of the village	Ruined	
St. John the Baptist church	Church		12th-13th centuries	Garnaqar	Ruined	
"Red Stone" monastery complex	Monastery		11th-14th centuries	Getavan	Ruined	
St. Anthony church	Church		2007	Zaglik	Operating	
"Qrhonj" church	Church		17th century	Zardakhach	Ruined	
Holy All-Savior church	Church		1894	Talish	Occupied	
"Horeka vank" monastery complex (Glkho vank)	Monastery		XIII-XVIII 13th-18th century	Talish	Occupied	
St. Stephen church	Church		1229	Talish	Occupied	
"Mamkan" church	Church		12th-13th centuries	Talish	Occupied	
Holy Mother of God church	Church		14th century	Kichan	Ruined	
"Desert" monastery complex (Khutavank)	Monastery		18th century	Kichan	Ruined	
"Kichan" church	Church		12th-13th centuries	Kichan	Ruined	
Church in the cemetery	Church		18th century	Kichan	Ruined	
Church in the settlement of "Eri shen"	Church		16th-17th centuries	Kichan	Ruined	
Church in the settlement of "Khorastan"	Church		9th-13th centuries	Kochoghot	Ruined	
Church in the cemetery of "Khachin ser"	Church		11th-12th centuries	Kochoghot	Ruined	
Church in the central cemetery	Church		11th-12th centuries	Kochoghot	Ruined	
Holy Mother of God church	Church		19th century	Haterk	Recoverable	
St. George church	Church		-	Haterk	Operating	
St. John the Baptist church	Church		19th century	Haterk	Ruined	
Church in the settlement of "Mandur"	Church		12th-13th centuries	Haterk	Ruined	
"Mesis" monastery complex	Monastery		14th-17th centuries	Haterk	Ruined	
St. Sarkis church	Church		2005	Harutyunagomer	Operating	
St. George church	Church		1609	Chankatagh	Ruined	
Church in the settlement of "Tsovategh"	Church		12th-13th centuries	Chankatagh	Ruined	
St. George church	Church		1898	Mataghis	Occupied	
St. Eghishe apostle monastery	Monastery		12th-13th centuries	Mataghis	Occupied	
St. Eghishe church	Church		1892-1898	Mataghis	Occupied	
St. Vanes church	Church		16th-17th centuries	Mataghis	Occupied	
St. George church	Church		1901	Maghavuz	Recoverable	
Church in the settlement of "Mayraqaghaq"	Church		10th-13th centuries	Maghavuz, settlement Mayraqaghaq	Ruined	
St. George church	Church		2011	Mets Shen	Operating	
Church in the South cemetery	Church		11th-13th centuries	Mets Shen	Ruined	
"Jraberd's desert" monastery complex	Monastery		17th century	Mets Shen	Ruined	
Holy Mother of God church	Church		1229	Mehmana	Occupied	
Church in the settlement of "Mandur"	Church		12th-15th centuries	Mehmana, settlement of "Mandur"	Ruined	
Holy Mother of God church	Church		1883	Mokhratagh	Recoverable	
Church of the Nine Relics,	Church		rebuilt in 1881	Mokhratagh	Ruined	
Holy Mother of God church	Church		1904-1914	Nerkin Horatagh	Operating	
St. George church	Church		2012	Nerkin Horatagh	Operating	
Church	Church		6th-7th centuries	Nor Karmiravan	Occupied	
Church in "Gyavur ghala"	Church		3th-9th centuries	Nor Haykajur	Ruined	
Vankasar's church	Church		1st-7th centuries	Nor Maragha	Occupied	
St. Stephen church	Church		12th-13th centuries	Shakhmasur	Ruined	
Church	Church		16th-17th centuries	Shakhmasur, settlement of "Qaren glukh"	Ruined	
Church in the	Church		17th century	Chapar, settlement of "Shenateghi eghtsi"	Ruined	
"Surben dyuz" church 1	Church		12th-13th centuries	Chapar	Ruined	
"Surben dyuz" church 2	Church		12th-13th centuries	Chapar	Ruined	
"Hin Chapar" church	Church		16th century	Chapar	Ruined	
Church	Church		12th-14th centuries	Chldran, settlement of "Eghtsateghi tumb"	Ruined	
"Karmir eghtsi" church	Church		16th-17th centuries	Chldran	Ruined	
"Nahatak" church	Church		13th-20th centuries	Chldran	Ruined	
Monastery of the Holy All-Savior	Monastery		12th-13th centuries	Poghosagomer	Ruined	
Holy Mother of God church	Church		2012	Vaghuhas, 40°07′04″N 46°28′36″E	Operating	
"Eghtsu ktor" church	Church		13th century	Vaghuhas	Ruined	
Church in the settlement of "Tleni"	Church		9th-13th centuries	Vaghuhas, settlement of "Tleni"	Ruined	
Khadar (Khatravank) monastery complex	Monastery		10th-17th centuries	Vaghuhas	Ruined	
"Karmir vank" monastery complex	Monastery		1224, 1529, 1281	Vaghuhas, 40°04′58″N 46°27′58″E	Ruined	
"Mayraqaghaq" (Tiramayr) monastery complex	Monastery		1183	Vaghuhas	Ruined	
"Shmaghbyur" church	Church		9th century	Vaghuhas	Ruined	
"Vardani gomer" monastery complex	Monastery		1225	Vaghuhas	Ruined	
Gandzasar monastery complex	Monastery		949	Vank	Occupied	
Havaptuk monastery complex	Monastery		1163	Vank	Ruined	
"Paravadzori vank" monastery comlex	Monastery		12th-13th centuries	Vank	Ruined	
St. Joseph church	Church		12th-13th centuries	Vardadzor	Ruined	
"Harutyunagomer" church	Church		12th-13th centuries	Vardadzor	Ruined	
Katoghikosasar monastery	Monastery		6th century	Varnkatagh	Ruined	
Church	Church		11th-13th centuries	Varnkatagh, "Poqr Toghkasar" settlement	Ruined	

=== Martuni region ===
Churches and monasteries of the Diocese of Artsakh - Martuni region
Name	Type	Image	Year	Location/geo	Status	Notes
Church of St. Nerses the Great	Church		2004	Martuni	Operating	

=== Shahumyan region ===
Churches and monasteries of the Diocese of Artsakh - Shahumyan region
Name	Type	Image	Year	Location/geo	Status	Notes
St. Dadi church	Church		1178	Dadivank, "Dadivank" monastery complex	Operating	

=== Shushi region ===
Churches and monasteries of the Diocese of Artsakh - Shushi region
Name	Type	Image	Year	Location/geo	Status	Notes
Holy Mother of God church or "Aguletsots"	Church		1822	Shushi city	Occupied	
Holy All-Savior church or "Meghretsots"	Church		1833	Shushi city	Occupied	
Holy All-Savior church or "Ghazanchetsots"	Church		1858-1887	Shushi city	Occupied	Damaged between 2020-10-25 and 2021-04-10
Holy All-Savior church or "Kharabakhtsots"	Church		18th-19th centuries	Shushi city	Occupied	
«St. John the Baptist» church or "Kanach jam"	Church		1818	Shushi city	Occupied	

=== Stepanakert ===
Churches and monasteries of the Diocese of Artsakh - Stepanakert
Name	Type	Image	Year	Location/geo	Status	Notes
Cathedral of the Holy Mother of God	Cathedral		2019	Stepanakert city	Operating	
St. Jacob church	Church		2007	Stepanakert city	Operating	

== Gallery ==
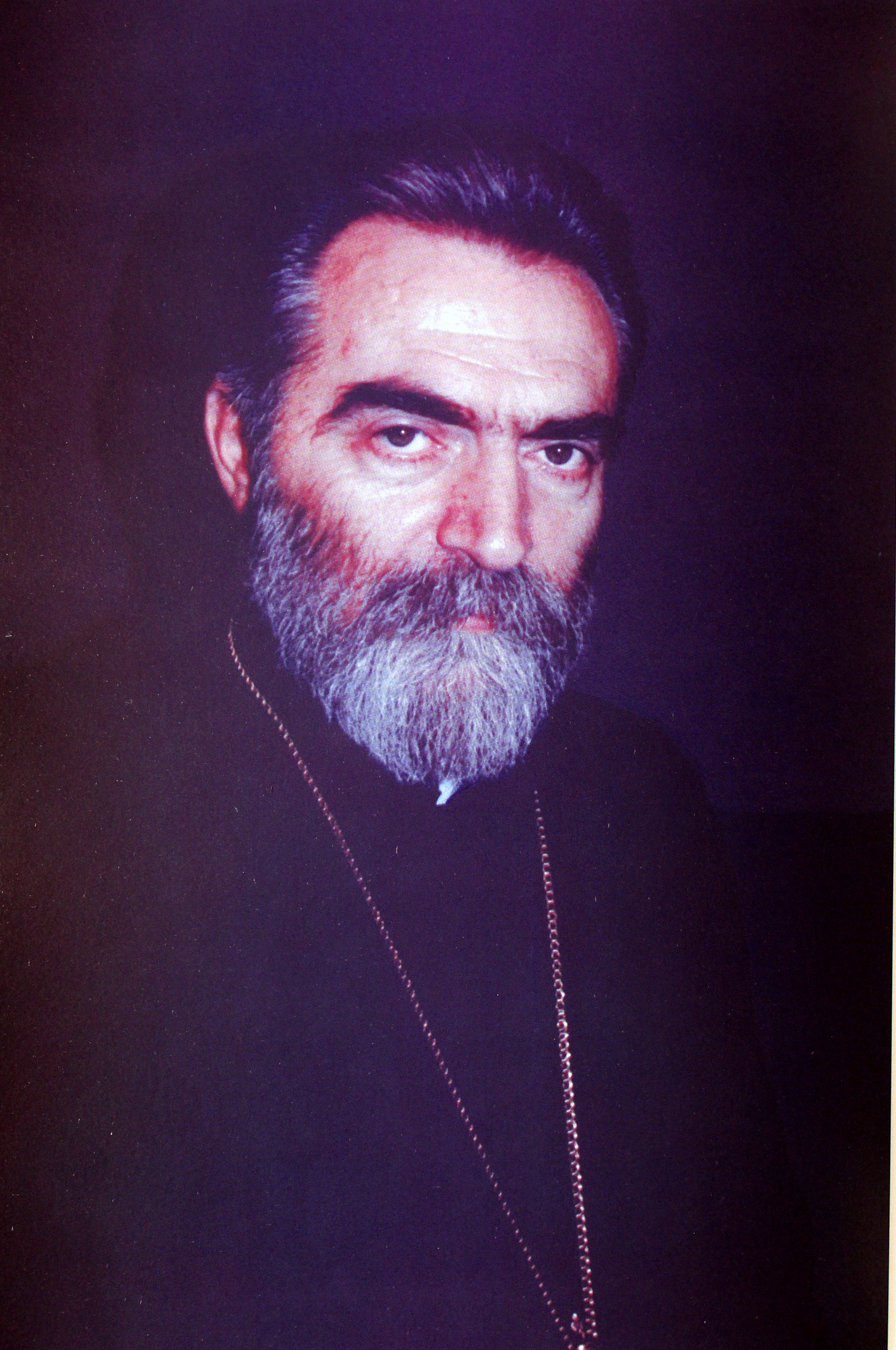
Archbishop Pargev Martirosyan
