= Jraberd =

Jraberd may refer to:

- Jraberd Melikdom, see Melikdoms of Karabakh
- Jraberd, Martakert
  - Jraberd Fortress
- Alternate name for Mülküdərə
- Jraberd FC
