= Qızıloba =

Qızıloba may refer to:

- Qızıloba, Khojali, Azerbaijan
- Qızıloba, Tartar, Azerbaijan
