= Vrtanes Abrahamyan =

Armenian clergyman (born 1962)

- Bishop of Artsakh
- Church: Armenian Apostolic Church
- Diocese: Artsakh
- Appointed: 21 January 2021
- Predecessor: Pargev Martirosyan

Orders
- Ordination: 22 May 1988
- Consecration: 24 August 2008 by Karekin II

Personal details
- Born: Kamo Abrahamyan; 21 March 1962 (age 64) Tsovategh, Nagorno-Karabakh Autonomous Oblast

Vrtanes Abrahamyan (born 21 March 1962) is a prelate of the Armenian Apostolic Church. He serves as the Primate of the Diocese of Artsakh since 2021.

== Religious career ==
Abrahamyan was ordained a priest on 22 May 1988. In 2007, he was appointed head chaplain of the Armed Forces of Armenia. He received episcopal consecration on 24 August 2008.

On 21 January 2021, it was announced that Archbishop Pargev was retiring from the post of Primate of the Diocese of Artsakh, and instead would serve as Catholicos Karekin II's pontifical envoy-at-large. He was succeeded by Abrahamyan, who previously held the post of spiritual leader of the Armed Forces of Armenia.
