= Avdur =

Village in Khojavend District, Azerbaijan

Avdur Ավդուռ
- Location within Azerbaijan
- Coordinates: 39°50′38″N 46°56′22″E
- Country: Azerbaijan
- Region: Nagorno-Karabakh
- District: Khojavend
- Elevation: 863 m (2,831 ft)

Population (2015)
  - Total: 127
- Time zone: UTC+4 (AZT)

Avdur (Armenian: Ավդուռ) is a village located in the Khojavend District of Azerbaijan, in the region of Nagorno-Karabakh. Until 2023 it was controlled by the breakaway Republic of Artsakh. The village had an ethnic Armenian-majority population until the expulsion of the Armenian population of Nagorno-Karabakh by Azerbaijan following the 2023 Azerbaijani offensive in Nagorno-Karabakh.

== History ==
During the Soviet period, the village was a part of the Martuni District of the Nagorno-Karabakh Autonomous Oblast.

== Historical heritage sites ==
Historical heritage sites in and around the village include an 18th/19th-century cemetery, and the church of Surb Astvatsatsin (Armenian: Սուրբ Աստվածածին, lit. 'Holy Mother of God') built in 1874.

== Economy and culture ==
The population is mainly engaged in agriculture and animal husbandry. As of 2015, the village has a municipal building, a house of culture, a school, and a medical centre.

== Demographics ==
The village had 151 inhabitants in 2005, and 127 inhabitants in 2015.
