= Garnakar, Nagorno-Karabakh =

Garnakar / Chormanly Գառնաքար / Çormanlı
- Location within Azerbaijan Location within East Zangezur Economic Region
- Coordinates: 40°02′06″N 46°34′05″E
- Country: Azerbaijan
  - District: Aghdara
- Elevation: 964 m (3,163 ft)

Population (2015)
  - Total: 161
- Time zone: UTC+4 (AZT)

Garnakar (Armenian: Գառնաքար) or Chormanly (Azerbaijani: Çormanlı) is a village that is located in the Aghdara District of Azerbaijan, in the region of Nagorno-Karabakh. Until 2023 it was controlled by the breakaway Republic of Artsakh. The village had an ethnic Armenian-majority population until the expulsion of the Armenian population of Nagorno-Karabakh by Azerbaijan following the 2023 Azerbaijani offensive in Nagorno-Karabakh.

== History ==
During the Soviet period, the village was part of the Mardakert District of the Nagorno-Karabakh Autonomous Oblast.

== Historical heritage sites ==
Historical heritage sites in and around the village include the 9th-century Hamami Church (Armenian: Համամի եկեղեցի, romanized: Hamami Yekeghetsi), the church of Hangats (Armenian: Հանգած) from between the 11th and 13th centuries, the fortress of Natarin (Armenian: Նատարին) or Ded (Armenian: Դեդ), the church of Mughdusi (Armenian: Մուղդուսի), two villages – one of them named Hamami Dzor (Armenian: Համամի ձոր), a cemetery and khachkars from between the 12th and the 13th centuries, the Mughdusi Cave, and an 18th/19th-century cemetery.

== Economy and culture ==
The population is mainly engaged in agriculture and animal husbandry. As of 2015, the village has a municipal building, a school, two shops, and a medical centre.

== Demographics ==
The village had 124 inhabitants in 2005, and 161 inhabitants in 2015.
