= Sarushen, Nagorno-Karabakh =

Sarushen / Daghyurd Սարուշեն / Dağyurd
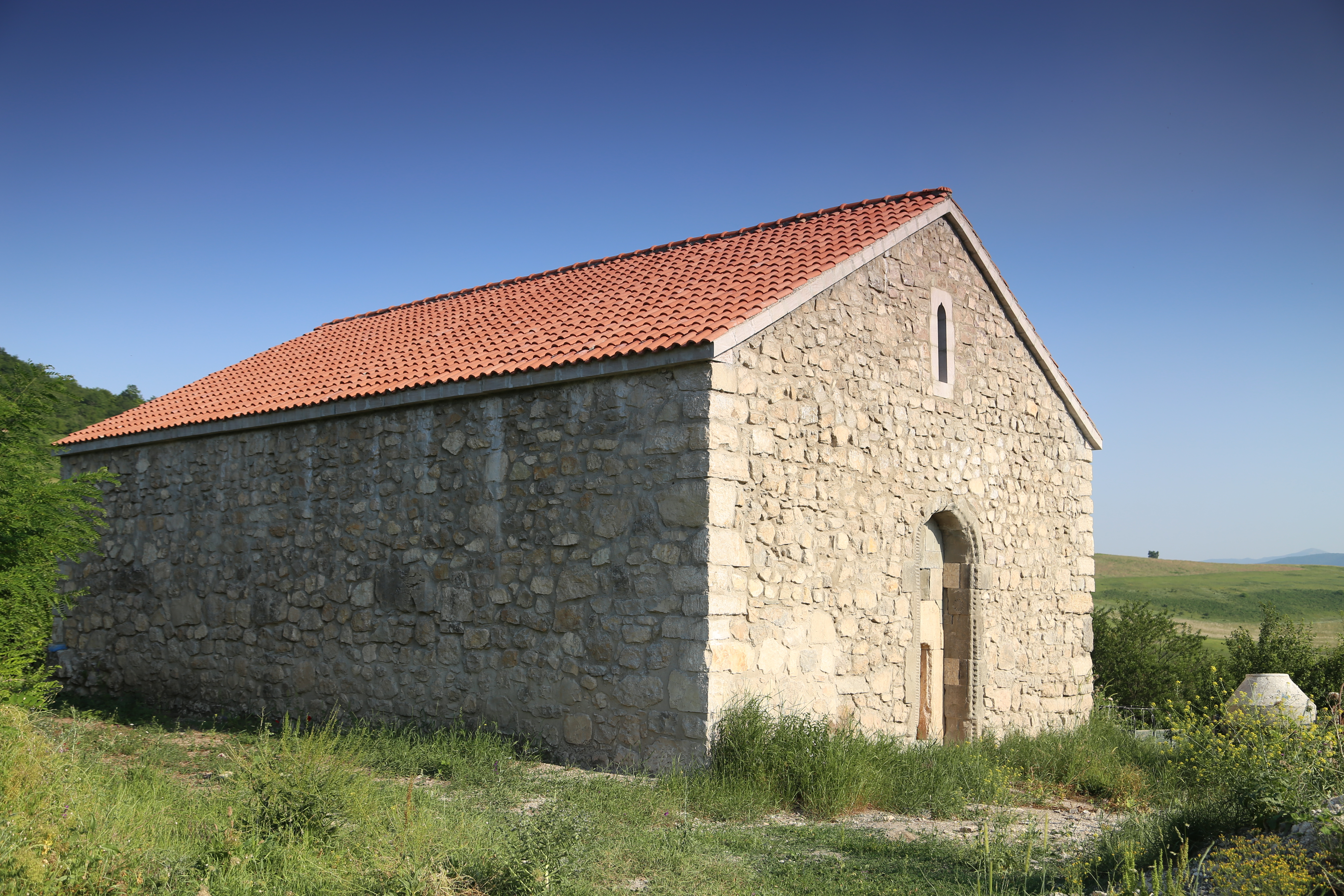
- Pirumashen Church in Sarushen

- Location within Azerbaijan Location within Karabakh Economic Region
- Coordinates: 39°43′20″N 46°54′20″E
- Country: Azerbaijan
  - District: Khojaly
- Elevation: 1,095 m (3,593 ft)

Population (2015)
  - Total: 378
- Time zone: UTC+4 (AZT)

Sarushen (Armenian: Սարուշեն) or Daghyurd (Azerbaijani: Dağyurd) is a village in the Khojaly District of Azerbaijan, in the region of Nagorno-Karabakh. Until 2023 it was controlled by the breakaway Republic of Artsakh. The village had an ethnic Armenian-majority population until the expulsion of the Armenian population of Nagorno-Karabakh by Azerbaijan following the 2023 Azerbaijani offensive in Nagorno-Karabakh.

== History ==
During the Soviet period, the village was part of the Askeran District of the Nagorno-Karabakh Autonomous Oblast.

== Historical heritage sites ==
Historical heritage sites in and around the village include a 12th/13th-century khachkar, the 17th-century church of Pirumashen (Armenian: Փիրումաշեն), restored in 2014 (possibly originating from as early as the 12th/13th century), the 18th/19th-century village of Pirumashen (Փիրումաշեն), an 18th/19th-century cemetery, and the 19th-century church of Surb Amenaprkich (Armenian: Սուրբ Ամենափրկիչ, lit. 'Holy Savior').

== Economy and culture ==
The population is mainly engaged in agriculture and animal husbandry. As of 2015, the village has a municipal building, a house of culture, a secondary school, four shops, and a medical centre.

== Demographics ==
The village had 388 inhabitants in 2005, and 378 inhabitants in 2015.

== Gallery ==
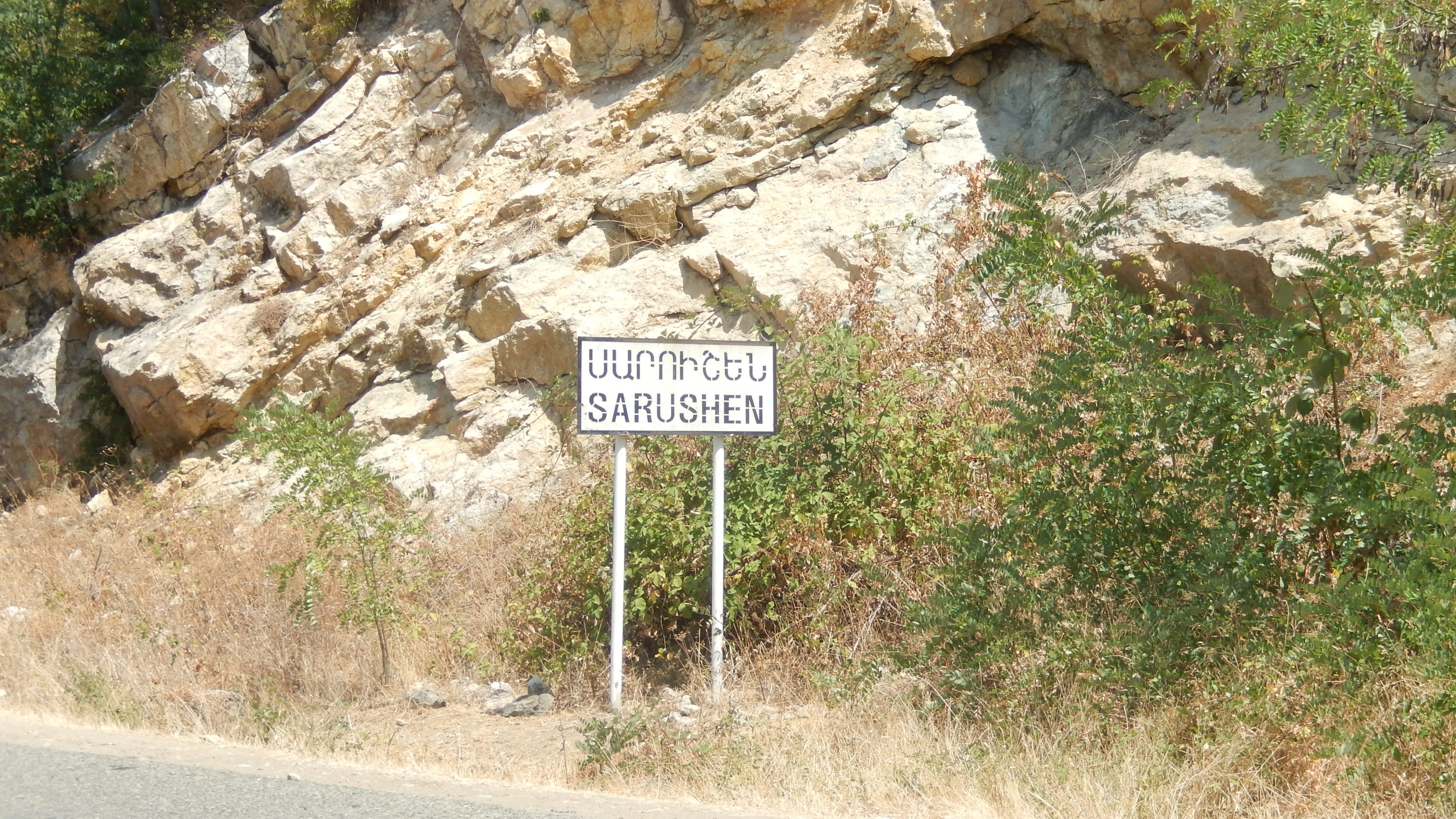
Sign in Armenian reading "Sarushen"

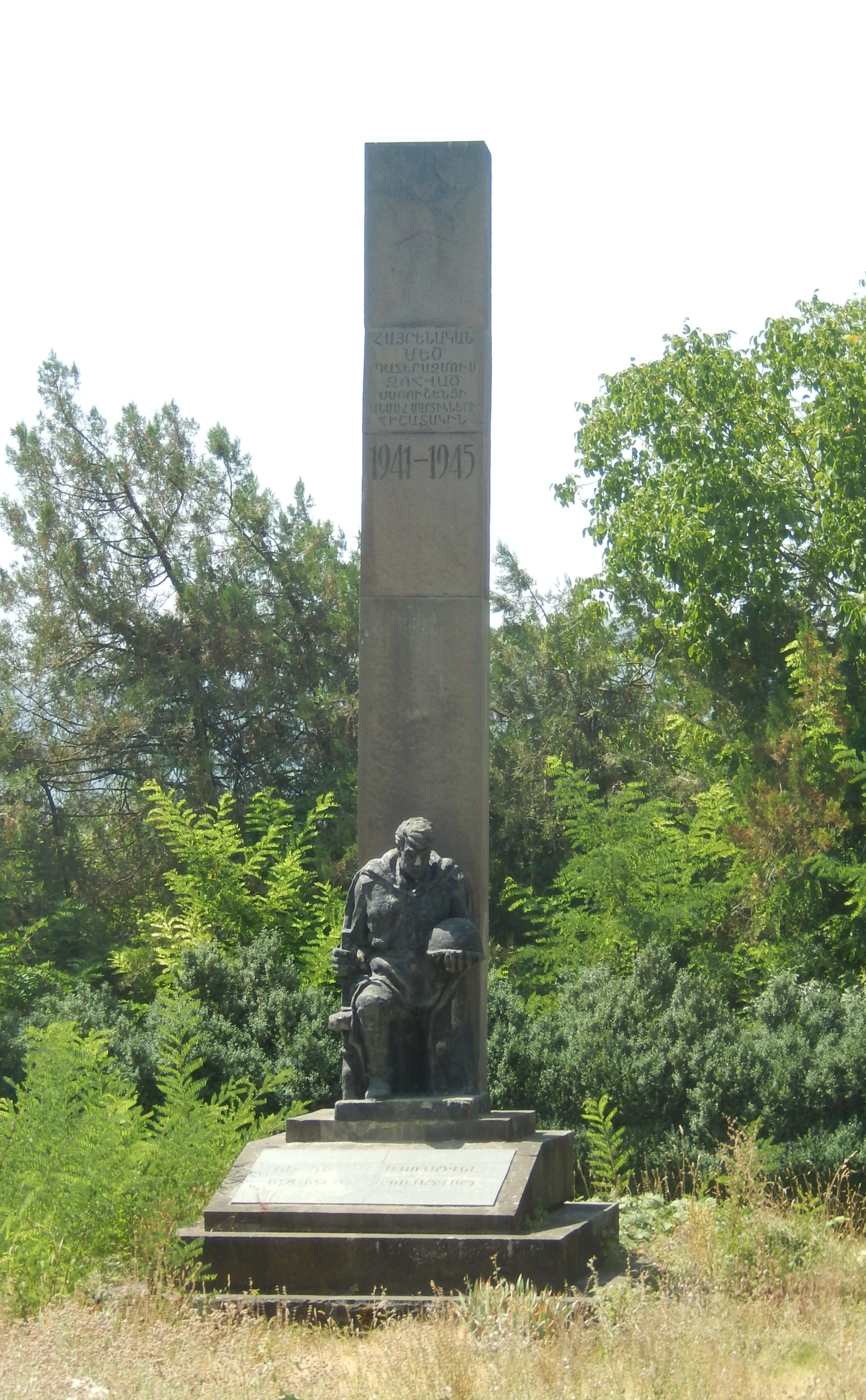
WWII monument

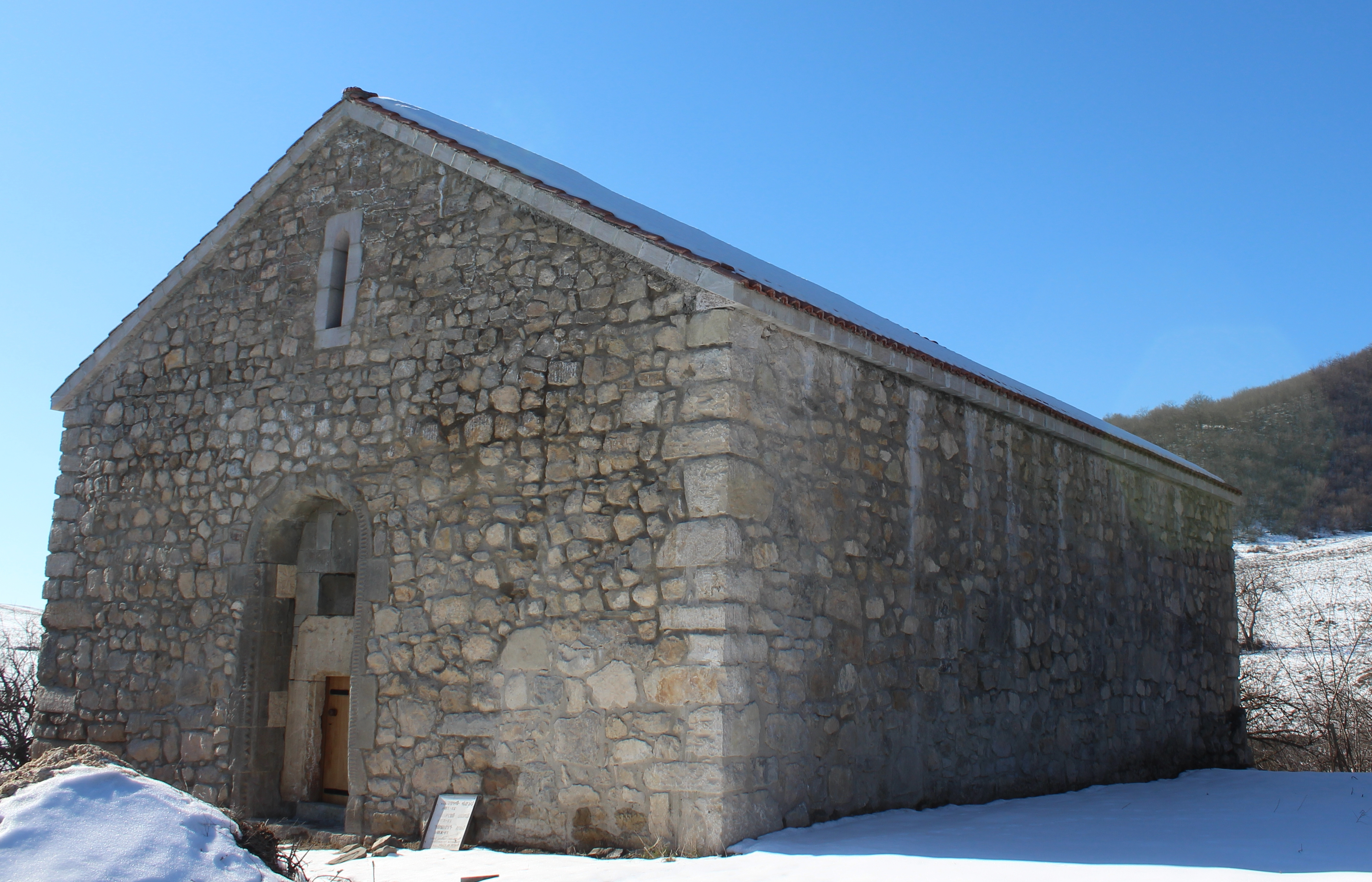
Pirumashen Church
