= Zaglik, Nagorno-Karabakh =

Zaglik / Zaylik Զագլիկ / Zəylik
- Location within Azerbaijan Location within Karabakh Economic Region
- Coordinates: 40°10′21″N 46°34′37″E
- Country: Azerbaijan
  - District: Aghdara
- Elevation: 836 m (2,743 ft)

Population (2015)
  - Total: 235
- Time zone: UTC+4 (AZT)

Zaglik (Armenian: Զագլիկ) or Zaylik (Azerbaijani: Zəylik) is a village that is in the Aghdara District of Azerbaijan, in the disputed region of Nagorno-Karabakh. Until 2023 it was controlled by the breakaway Republic of Artsakh. The village had an ethnic Armenian-majority population until the expulsion of the Armenian population of Nagorno-Karabakh by Azerbaijan following the 2023 Azerbaijani offensive in Nagorno-Karabakh.

== History ==
During the Soviet period, the village was a part of the Mardakert District of the Nagorno-Karabakh Autonomous Oblast.

== Economy and culture ==
The population is mainly engaged in agriculture and animal husbandry. As of 2015, the village has a municipal building, a secondary school, two shops, and a medical centre.

== Demographics ==
The village had 200 inhabitants in 2005, and 235 inhabitants in 2015.
