= Alxaslı =

- Location within Azerbaijan Location within East Zangezur Economic Region
- Coordinates: 39°44′34″N 46°20′58″E
- Country: Azerbaijan
- District: Lachin

Population (2015)
  - Total: 61
- Time zone: UTC+4 (AZT)

Alkhasly (Azerbaijani: Alxaslı) or Arvakan (Armenian: Արվական) is a village in the Lachin District of Azerbaijan.

== History ==
The village was formerly part of the Red Kurdistan and later the Kurdistan Okrug. During the First Nagorno-Karabakh War in May 1992, it came under the control of ethnic Armenian forces and was located in the Armenian-occupied territories surrounding Nagorno-Karabakh. Subsequently, the village became part of the breakaway Republic of Artsakh as part of its Kashatagh Province, referred to as Arvakan (Armenian: Արվական). On 1 December 2020, it was returned to Azerbaijan as part of the 2020 Nagorno-Karabakh ceasefire agreement.
