= Sardarashen, Nagorno-Karabakh =

Sardarashen / Sardarkend Սարդարաշեն / Sərdarkənd
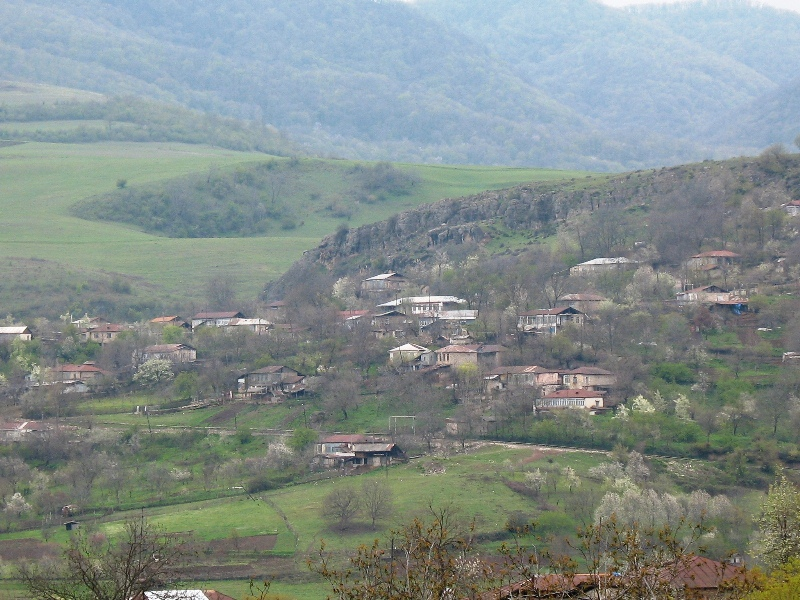
- A view of Sardarashen

- Location within Azerbaijan Location within Karabakh Economic Region
- Coordinates: 39°59′22″N 46°45′43″E
- Country: Azerbaijan
  - District: Khojaly
- Elevation: 1,004 m (3,294 ft)

Population (2015)
  - Total: 137
- Time zone: UTC+4 (AZT)

Sardarashen (Armenian: Սարդարաշեն) or Sardarkend (Azerbaijani: Sərdarkənd) is a village in the Khojaly District of Azerbaijan, in the region of Nagorno-Karabakh. Until 2023 it was controlled by the breakaway Republic of Artsakh. The village had an ethnic Armenian-majority population until the expulsion of the Armenian population of Nagorno-Karabakh by Azerbaijan following the 2023 Azerbaijani offensive in Nagorno-Karabakh.

== History ==
The modern village was founded in the 1760s. During the Soviet period, the village was part of the Askeran District of the Nagorno-Karabakh Autonomous Oblast.

== Historical heritage sites ==
Historical heritage sites in and around the village include the cave of Chngl (Armenian: Չնգլ), the village of Norshen (Armenian: Նորշեն) from between the 12th and 19th centuries, a 12th/13th-century khachkar, a cemetery from between the 17th and 19th centuries, the 18th-century St. George's Church (Armenian: Սուրբ Գևորգ եկեղեցի, romanized: Surb Gevorg Yekeghetsi), and a 19th/20th-century shrine.

== Economy and culture ==
The population is mainly engaged in agriculture and animal husbandry. As of 2015, the village has a municipal building, a house of culture, a secondary school, and a medical centre.

== Demographics ==
The village has an ethnic Armenian-majority population. It had 181 inhabitants in 2005, and 137 inhabitants in 2015.
