= Hoçaz =

- Location within Azerbaijan Location within East Zangezur Economic Region
- Coordinates: 39°40′31″N 46°27′27″E
- Country: Azerbaijan
- District: Lachin

Population (2015)
  - Total: 56
- Time zone: UTC+4 (AZT)

Hoçaz (Hochaz) or Hochants (Armenian: Հոչանց) is a village in the Lachin District of Azerbaijan.

== History ==
The village was located in the Armenian-occupied territories surrounding Nagorno-Karabakh, coming under the control of ethnic Armenian forces during the First Nagorno-Karabakh War in the early 1990s. The village subsequently became part of the breakaway Republic of Artsakh as part of its Kashatagh Province, where it was known as Hochants (Armenian: Հոչանց). It was returned to Azerbaijan as part of the 2020 Nagorno-Karabakh ceasefire agreement.

== Historical heritage sites ==
Historical heritage sites in and around the village include a cave, a 14th-century cemetery, eight 14th-century khachkars, the church of Hochantsi Anapat (Armenian: Հոչանցի անապատ) from 1621, a 16th/17th-century khachkar, a 17th-century tombstone, a 17th-century stele, and the 17th-century St. Stephen's Church (Armenian: Սուրբ Ստեփանոս եկեղեցի, romanized: Surb Stepanos Yekeghetsi), which was reconsecrated in 2019.
