= Monastery of Tsar =

Monastery in Zar, Azerbaijan

- Location within Azerbaijan Location within Republic of Artsakh

Religion
- Affiliation: Armenian Apostolic Church

Location
- Location: Zar, Azerbaijan
- Coordinates: 40°00′19″N 45°57′08″E

Architecture
- Type: Monastery, Church
- Style: Armenian
- Completed: 1301

The Monastery of Tsar or Tsara Surb Astvatsatsin (Armenian: Ծարա Սուրբ Աստվածածին), also known as the Holy Mother of God Church (Armenian: Սուրբ Աստվածածին եկեղեցի, romanized: Surb Astvatsatsin Yekeghetsi), was an Armenian Apostolic monastery located in the village of Zar (Tsar) in the Kalbajar District in Azerbaijan. It was built in 1301 in the Principality of Khachen. It was destroyed by Azeri authorities during the Soviet era. The monastery was blown up, two 13th-century chapels were razed. The elaborately engraved stones of the church were used to build storehouses, and are now visible in the foundations of barns built by the Azeris.
