= Lusadzor, Nagorno-Karabakh =

Lusadzor / Mehdibayli Լուսաձոր / Mehdibəyli
- Location within Azerbaijan
- Coordinates: 39°53′35″N 46°43′52″E
- Country: Azerbaijan
  - District: Khojaly
- Elevation: 823 m (2,700 ft)

Population (2015)
  - Total: 177
- Time zone: UTC+4 (AZT)

Lusadzor (Armenian: Լուսաձոր) or Mehdibayli (Azerbaijani: Mehdibəyli) is a village located in the Khojaly District of Azerbaijan, in the region of Nagorno-Karabakh. Until 2023 it was controlled by the breakaway Republic of Artsakh. The village had an ethnic Armenian-majority population until the expulsion of the Armenian population of Nagorno-Karabakh by Azerbaijan following the 2023 Azerbaijani offensive in Nagorno-Karabakh.

== Toponymy ==
The village was known as Mekhdishen (Russian: Мехдишен) during the Soviet period.

== History ==
During the Soviet period, the village was part of the Askeran District of the Nagorno-Karabakh Autonomous Oblast.

== Historical heritage sites ==
Historical heritage sites in and around the village include a settlement, chapel-shrine and tombs from the 2nd–1st millennia BCE, as well as the 19th-century church of Surb Astvatsatsin (Armenian: Սուրբ Աստվածածին, lit. 'Holy Mother of God').

== Economy and culture ==
The population is mainly engaged in agriculture and animal husbandry. As of 2015, the village has a municipal building, a house of culture, a school, and a medical centre.

== Demographics ==
The village has an ethnic Armenian-majority population, had 177 inhabitants in 2005, and 177 inhabitants in 2015.
