= Krasni, Nagorno-Karabakh =

Krasni / Daghdaghan Քռասնի / Dağdağan

- Location within Azerbaijan Location within Karabakh Economic Region
- Coordinates: 39°47′52″N 46°49′18″E
- Country: Azerbaijan
  - District: Khojaly
- Elevation: 962 m (3,156 ft)

Population (2015)
  - Total: 243
- Time zone: UTC+4 (AZT)

Krasni (Armenian: Քռասնի) or Daghdaghan (Azerbaijani: Dağdağan) is a village in the Khojaly District of Azerbaijan, in the region of Nagorno-Karabakh. Until 2023 it was controlled by the breakaway Republic of Artsakh. The village had an ethnic Armenian-majority population until the expulsion of the Armenian population of Nagorno-Karabakh by Azerbaijan following the 2023 Azerbaijani offensive in Nagorno-Karabakh.

== History ==
During the Soviet period, the village was part of the Askeran District of the Nagorno-Karabakh Autonomous Oblast.

== Historical heritage sites ==
Historical heritage sites in and around the village include a 19th-century church and cemetery.

== Economy and culture ==
The population is mainly engaged in agriculture and animal husbandry. As of 2015, the village has a municipal building, a house of culture, a secondary school, and a medical centre.

== Demographics ==
The village had 213 inhabitants in 2005, and 243 inhabitants in 2015.

== Gallery ==
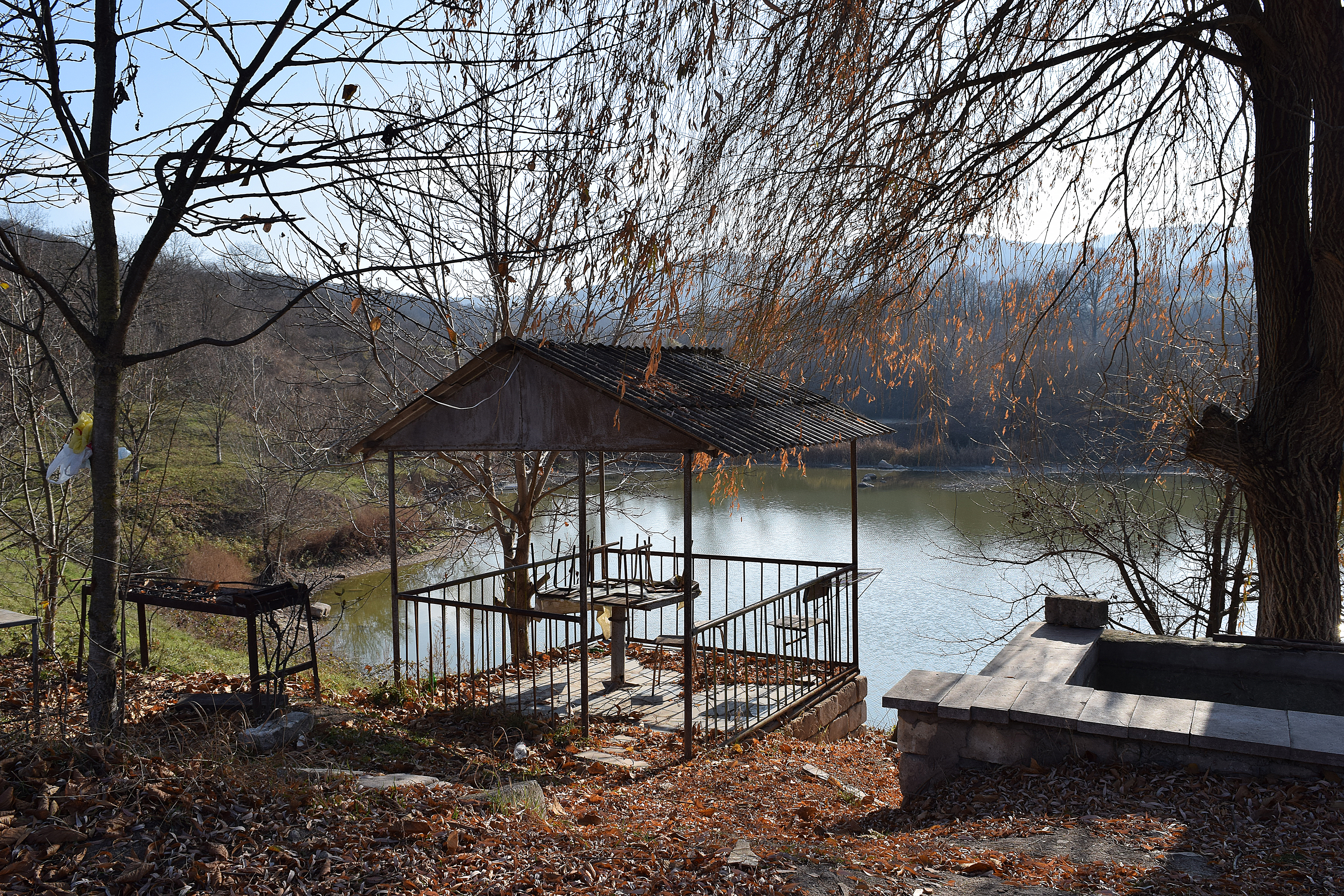
Landscape

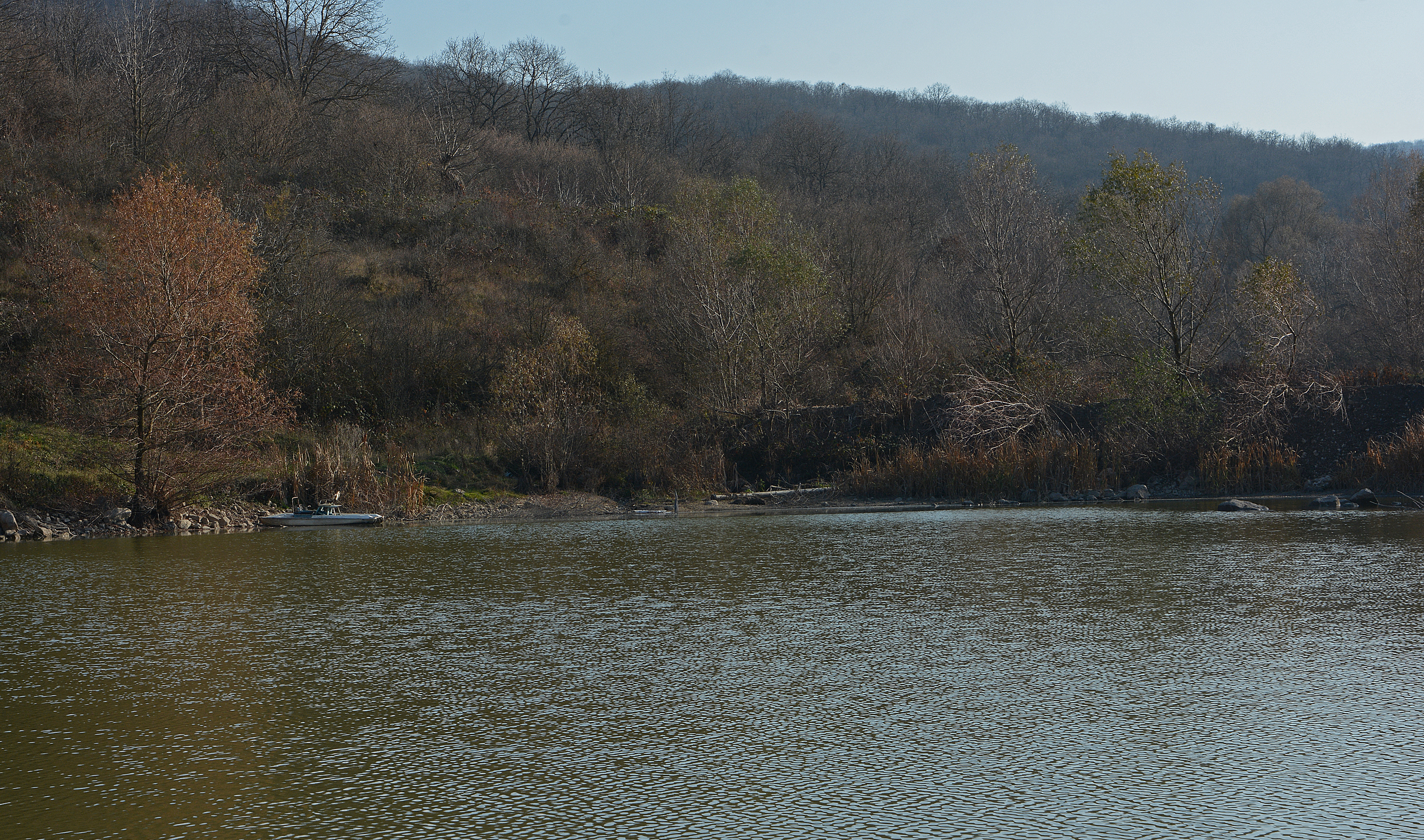
Lake near the village

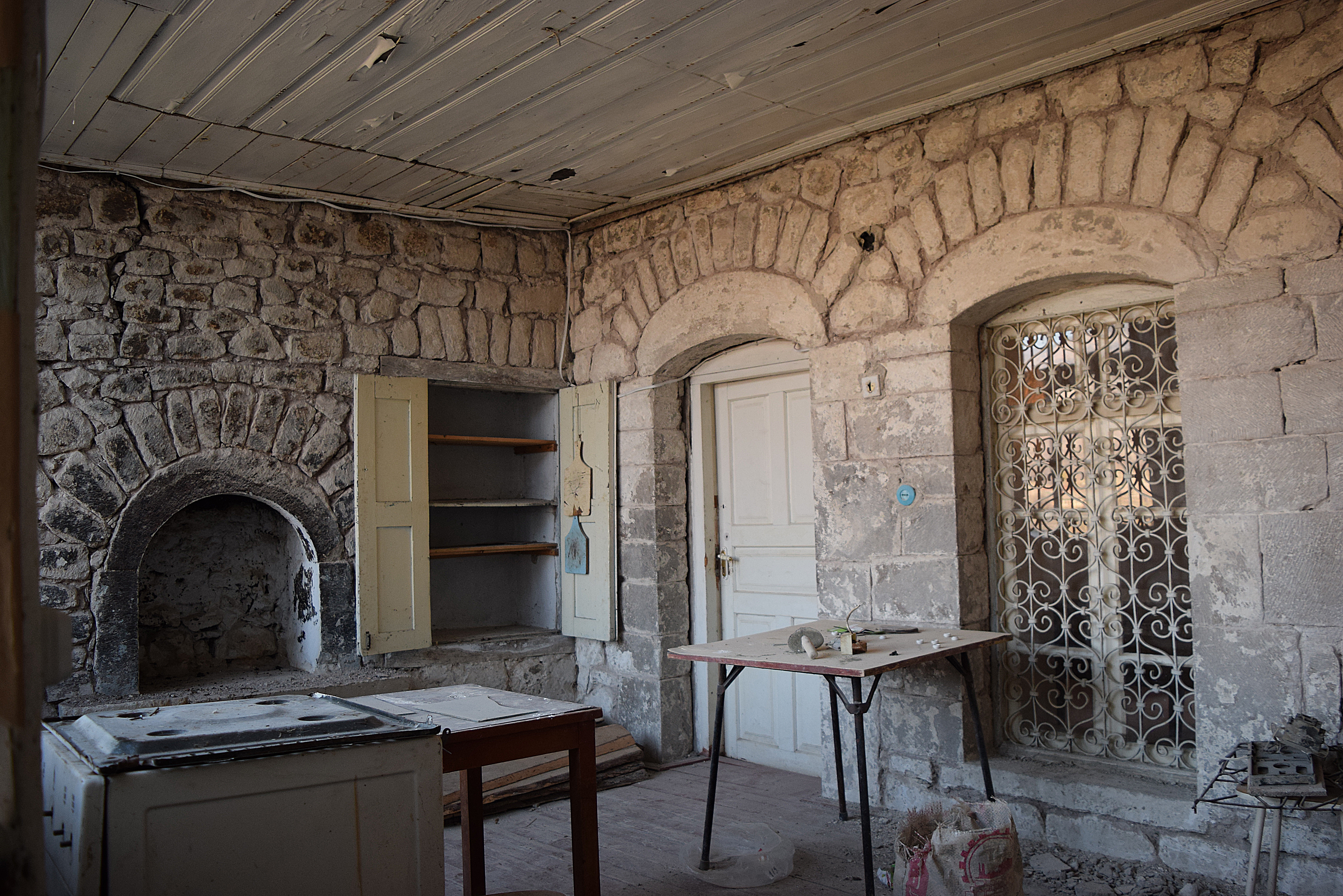
Museum

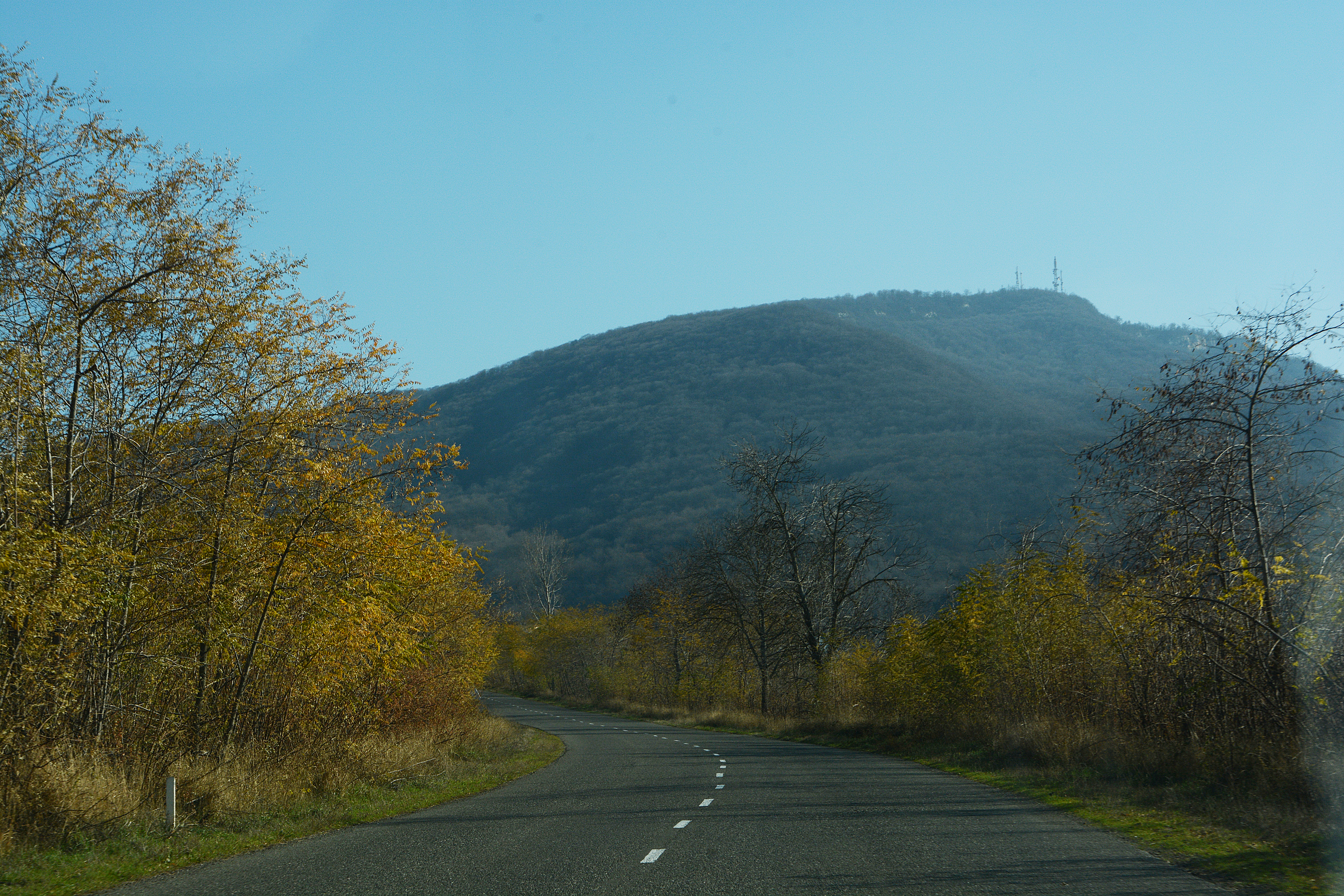
Road leading to the village

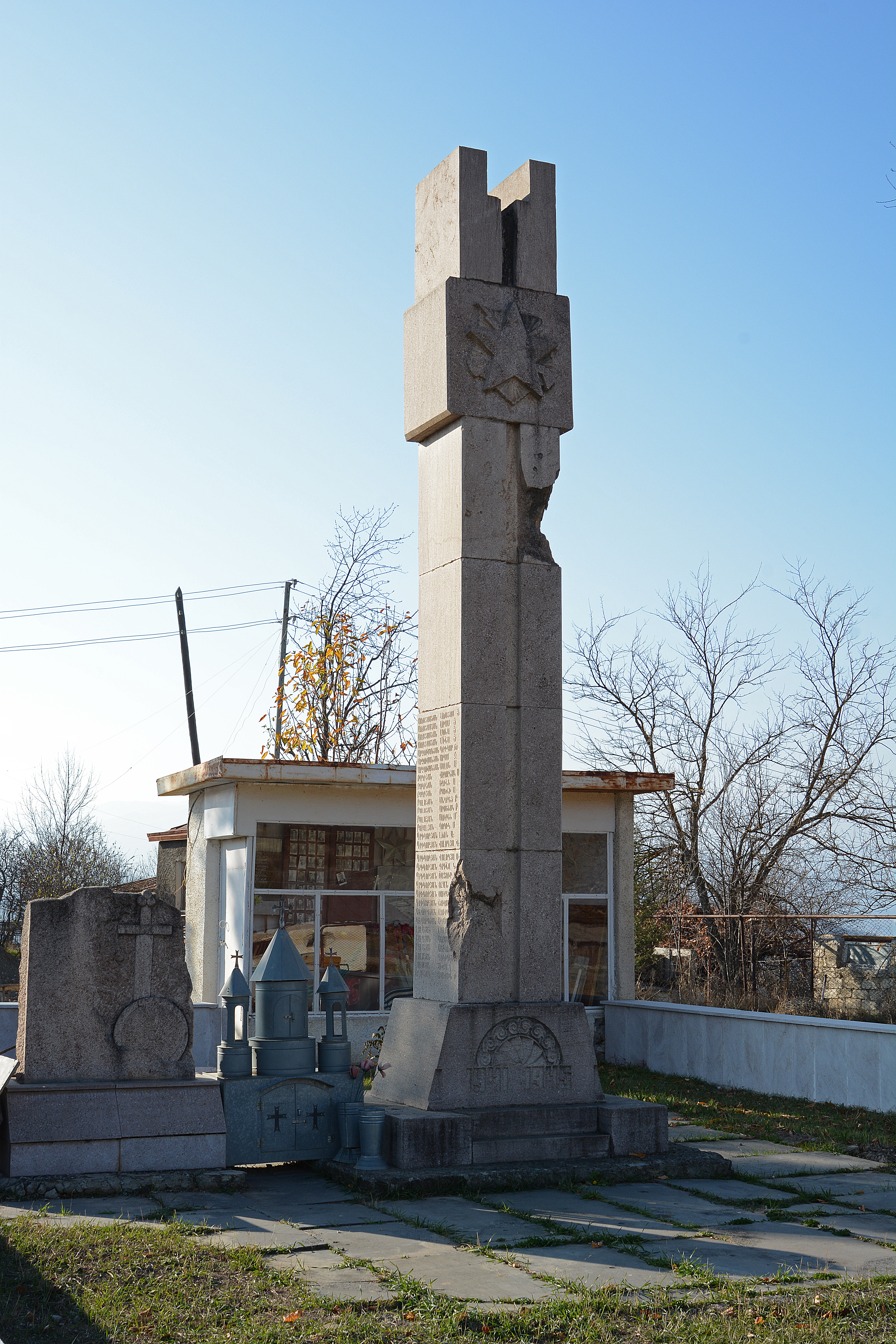
World War II Monument
