= Varnkatagh, Nagorno-Karabakh =

Varnkatagh / Lulasaz Վարնկաթաղ / Lüləsaz
- Location within Azerbaijan
- Coordinates: 40°16′40″N 46°43′45″E
- Country: Azerbaijan
  - District: Aghdara

Population (2015)
  - Total: 95
- Time zone: UTC+4 (AZT)

Varnkatagh (Armenian: Վարնկաթաղ) or Lulasaz (Armenian: Լուլասազ; Azerbaijani: Lüləsaz) is a village located in the Aghdara District of Azerbaijan, in the region of Nagorno-Karabakh. Until 2023 it was controlled by the breakaway Republic of Artsakh. The village had an ethnic Armenian-majority population until the expulsion of the Armenian population of Nagorno-Karabakh by Azerbaijan following the 2023 Azerbaijani offensive in Nagorno-Karabakh.

== Toponymy ==
The village was known as Hakob Kamari (Armenian: Հակոբ Կամարի; Russian: Акоп Камари, romanized: Akop Kamari) during the Soviet period.

== History ==
During the Soviet period, the village was part of the Mardakert District of the Nagorno-Karabakh Autonomous Oblast.

== Economy and culture ==
The population is mainly engaged in agriculture and animal husbandry. As of 2015, the village has a municipal building, the Varnkatagh branch of the Maghavuz Secondary School, and a medical centre.

== Demographics ==
The village had 68 inhabitants in 2005, and 95 inhabitants in 2015.
