= Harutyunagomer, Nagorno-Karabakh =

Harutyunagomer / Gyzylgaya Հարությունագոմեր / Qızılqaya
- Location within Azerbaijan Location within East Zangezur Economic Region
- Coordinates: 40°07′32″N 46°30′58″E
- Country: Azerbaijan
  - District: Aghdara

Population (2015)
  - Total: 517
- Time zone: UTC+4 (AZT)

Harutyunagomer (Armenian: Հարությունագոմեր) or Gyzylgaya (Azerbaijani: Qızılqaya) is a village located in the region of Nagorno-Karabakh, in the Aghdara District of Azerbaijan. Until 2023 it was controlled by the breakaway Republic of Artsakh. The village had an ethnic Armenian-majority population until the expulsion of the Armenian population of Nagorno-Karabakh by Azerbaijan following the 2023 Azerbaijani offensive in Nagorno-Karabakh.

== History ==
During the Soviet period, the village was part of the Mardakert District of the Nagorno-Karabakh Autonomous Oblast.

== Historical heritage sites ==
Historical heritage sites in and around the village include tombs from the 2nd–1st millennia BCE, a medieval village, as well as an 18th/19th-century church and cemetery.

== Economy and culture ==
The village has a municipal building, a medical centre, five shops, and a secondary school.

== Demographics ==
The village had 400 inhabitants in 2005, and 517 inhabitants in 2015.
