= Ərdəşəvi =

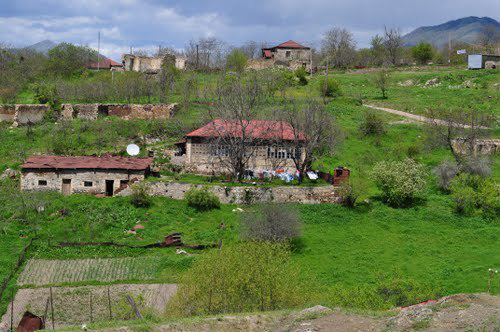

- Location within Azerbaijan Location within East Zangezur Economic Region
- Coordinates: 39°46′00.8″N 46°28′58.3″E
- Country: Azerbaijan
- District: Lachin

Population (2015)
  - Total: 127
- Time zone: UTC+4 (AZT)

Ərdəşəvi (Ardashavi) is a village in the Lachin District of Azerbaijan.

== History ==
The village was located in the Armenian-occupied territories surrounding Nagorno-Karabakh, coming under the control of ethnic Armenian forces during the First Nagorno-Karabakh War in the early 1990s. The village subsequently became part of the breakaway Republic of Artsakh as part of its Kashatagh Province, referred to as Artashavi (Armenian: Արտաշավի). It was returned to Azerbaijan as part of the 2020 Nagorno-Karabakh ceasefire agreement.

== Historical heritage sites ==
Historical heritage sites in and around the village include the historical village of Malkhalap (Armenian: Մալխալափ, also Malkhalaf) with a ruined medieval bridge nearby, a stele from 1221, a 13th-century khachkar, a khachkar from 1481, a tombstone from 1575, and two 17th-century khachkars.

== Demographics ==
The village had 88 inhabitants in 2005, and 127 inhabitants in 2015.

== Gallery ==
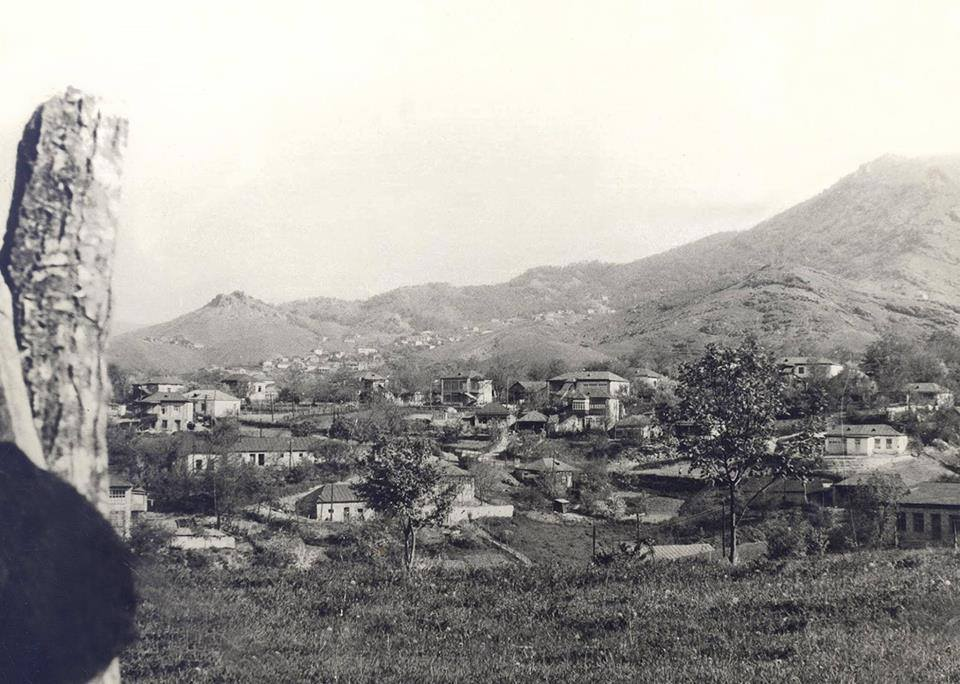
