= Qaragöl =

- Location within Azerbaijan
- Coordinates: 39°07′24″N 46°32′29″E
- Country: Azerbaijan
- District: Zangilan

Population (2015)
  - Total: 38
- Time zone: UTC+4 (AZT)

Qaragöl (Garagol) or Keren (Armenian: Կերեն) is a village in the Zangilan District of Azerbaijan.

== History ==
The village was located in the Armenian-occupied territories surrounding Nagorno-Karabakh, coming under the control of ethnic Armenian forces during the First Nagorno-Karabakh War in the early 1990s. The village subsequently became part of the breakaway Republic of Artsakh as part of its Kashatagh Province, referred to as Keren (Armenian: Կերեն). It was returned to Azerbaijan as part of the 2020 Nagorno-Karabakh ceasefire agreement on 1 December 2020.
