= Shahmasur, Nagorno-Karabakh =

Shahmasur / Shahmansurlu Շահմասուր / Şahmansurlu
- Location within Azerbaijan Location within East Zangezur Economic Region
- Coordinates: 40°03′34″N 46°35′04″E
- Country: Azerbaijan
  - District: Aghdara
- Elevation: 1,110 m (3,640 ft)

Population (2015)
  - Total: 148
- Time zone: UTC+4 (AZT)

Shahmasur (Armenian: Շահմասուր) or Shahmansurlu (Azerbaijani: Şahmansurlu) is a village located in the Aghdara District of Azerbaijan, in the region of Nagorno-Karabakh. Until 2023 it was controlled by the breakaway Republic of Artsakh. The village had an ethnic Armenian-majority population until the expulsion of the Armenian population of Nagorno-Karabakh by Azerbaijan following the 2023 Azerbaijani offensive in Nagorno-Karabakh.

== History ==
During the Soviet period, the village was part of the Mardakert District of the Nagorno-Karabakh Autonomous Oblast.

== Historical heritage sites ==
Historical heritage sites in and around the village include a cemetery from between the 11th and 13th centuries, the 12th/13th-century church of Khachin Dzor (Armenian: Խաչին ձոր), an 18th/19th-century cemetery, a 19th-century church, and a 19th-century spring monument.

== Economy and culture ==
The population is mainly engaged in agriculture and animal husbandry. As of 2015, the village has a municipal building, a house of culture, a school, and a medical centre.

== Demographics ==
The village had 139 inhabitants in 2005, and 148 inhabitants in 2015.
