= Piçənis =

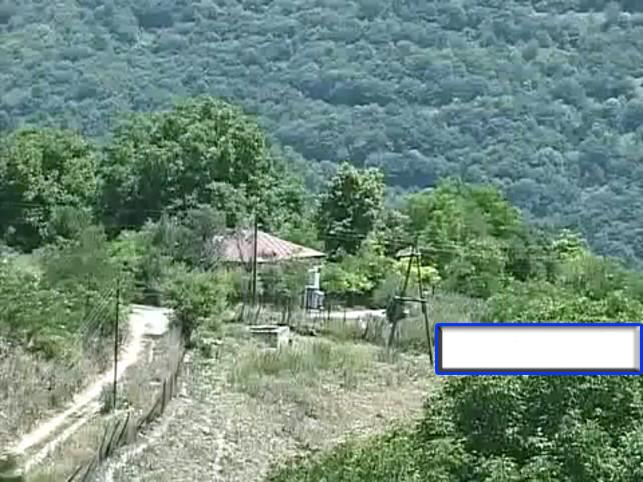

- Location within Azerbaijan Location within East Zangezur Economic Region
- Coordinates: 39°48′11″N 46°26′48″E
- Country: Azerbaijan
- District: Lachin

Population (2015)
  - Total: 68
- Time zone: UTC+4 (AZT)

Piçənis (Pichanis) is a village in the Lachin District of Azerbaijan.

== History ==
The village was located in the Armenian-occupied territories surrounding Nagorno-Karabakh, coming under the control of ethnic Armenian forces during the First Nagorno-Karabakh War in the early 1990s. The village subsequently became part of the breakaway Republic of Artsakh as part of its Kashatagh Province, where it was known as Vakunis (Armenian: Վակունիս). It was returned to Azerbaijan as part of the 2020 Nagorno-Karabakh ceasefire agreement.

== Historical heritage sites ==
Historical heritage sites in and around the village include a medieval village, the medieval village of Aghjayaz (Armenian: Աղջայազ), two 13th-century khachkars, a 15th/16th-century khachkar, a 17th-century church, a 17th/18th-century tombstone, a 19th century cemetery, and a 19th-century mausoleum.
