= Zardakhach =

Zardakhach Զարդախաչ
- Zardaxaç
- Location within Azerbaijan Location within East Zangezur Economic Region
- Coordinates: 40°09′21″N 46°28′24″E
- Country: Azerbaijan
  - District: Aghdara
- Elevation: 1,043 m (3,422 ft)

Population (2015)
  - Total: 136
- Time zone: UTC+4 (AZT)

Zardakhach (Armenian: Զարդախաչ; Azerbaijani: Zardaxaç, also Zardakhan) is a village in the Aghdara District of Azerbaijan, in the region of Nagorno-Karabakh. Until 2023 it was controlled by the breakaway Republic of Artsakh. The village had an ethnic Armenian-majority population until the expulsion of the Armenian population of Nagorno-Karabakh by Azerbaijan following the 2023 Azerbaijani offensive in Nagorno-Karabakh.

== History ==
During the Soviet period, the village was a part of the Mardakert District of the Nagorno-Karabakh Autonomous Oblast.

== Historical heritage sites ==
Historical heritage sites in and around the village include an 18th/19th-century cemetery, and a 19th-century spring monument.

== Economy and culture ==
The population is mainly engaged in agriculture and animal husbandry. As of 2015, the village has a municipal building, a school, two shops, and a medical centre.

== Demographics ==
The village had 125 inhabitants in 2005, and 136 inhabitants in 2015.
