= Korcabulaq =

- Location within Azerbaijan Location within East Zangezur Economic Region
- Coordinates: 39°51′47″N 46°22′09″E
- Country: Azerbaijan
- District: Lachin

Population (2015)
  - Total: 6
- Time zone: UTC+4 (AZT)

Korcabulaq (Azerbaijani: Korjabulag) or Aghbradzor (Armenian: Աղբրաձոր) is a village in the Lachin District of Azerbaijan.

== History ==
The village was located in the Armenian-occupied territories surrounding Nagorno-Karabakh, coming under the control of ethnic Armenian forces during the First Nagorno-Karabakh War in the early 1990s, subsequently becoming part of the breakaway Republic of Artsakh as part of its Kashatagh Province, where it was known as Aghbradzor (Armenian: Աղբրաձոր). The village was returned to Azerbaijan as part of the 2020 Nagorno-Karabakh ceasefire agreement.

== Historical heritage sites ==
Historical heritage sites in and around the village include a burial mound from the 2nd–1st millennia BCE, a khachkar from 1068, a khachkar from 1069, a khachkar from 1075, an 11th-century khachkar on a pedestal, the 11th/12th-century monastery church of Mayrejri Vank (Armenian: Մայրեջրի վանք), three 11th/12th-century khachkars, an 11th/12th-century defensive wall, the cemetery of Mayrejri Vank from between the 11th and 17th centuries, four 12th/13th-century khachkars, a 12th/13th-century tombstone, a khachkar from 1244, a 13th-century khachkar, a 15th-century khachkar, a 16th/17th-century tombstone, and a tombstone from 1641.
