= Kaghartsi =

Kaghartsi Կաղարծի
- Qağartsi
- Location within Azerbaijan
- Coordinates: 39°48′54″N 46°56′29″E
- Country: Azerbaijan
  - District: Khojavend

Population (2015)
  - Total: 306
- Time zone: UTC+4 (AZT)

Kaghartsi (Armenian: Կաղարծի; Azerbaijani: Qağartsi, Gaghartsi) is a village located in the Khojavend District of Azerbaijan, in the region of Nagorno-Karabakh. Until 2023 it was controlled by the breakaway Republic of Artsakh. The village had an ethnic Armenian-majority population until the expulsion of the Armenian population of Nagorno-Karabakh by Azerbaijan following the 2023 Azerbaijani offensive in Nagorno-Karabakh.

== History ==
During the Soviet period, the village was a part of the Martuni District of the Nagorno-Karabakh Autonomous Oblast.

== Historical heritage sites ==
Historical heritage sites in and around the village include a 13th-century khachkar, the 17th/18th-century chapel of Lusavorich (Armenian: Լուսավորիչ), an 18th/19th-century cemetery, a 19th-century spring monument, and the 19th-century monastery church of Targmanchats (Armenian: Թարգմանչաց).

== Economy and culture ==
The population is mainly engaged in agriculture and animal husbandry. As of 2015, the village has a municipal building, a house of culture, a secondary school, and a medical centre.

== Demographics ==
The village had 337 inhabitants in 2005, and 306 inhabitants in 2015.
