= Khandzk =

Khandzk / Khanyeri Խանձք / Xanyeri
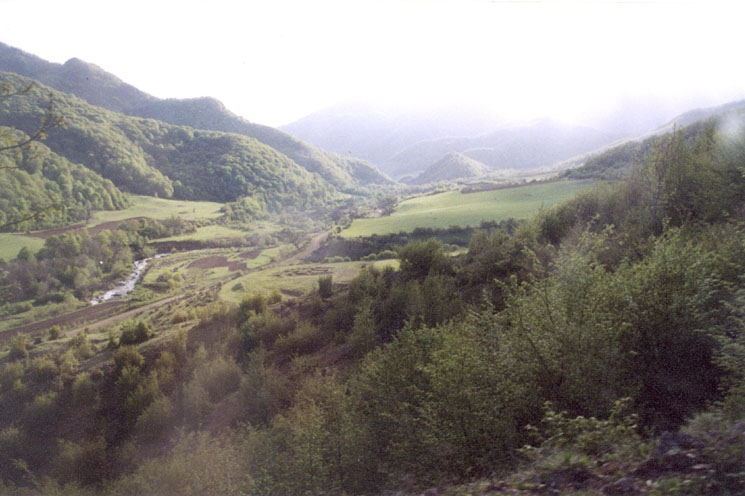

- Location within Azerbaijan Location within Karabakh Economic Region
- Coordinates: 39°56′02″N 46°40′43″E
- Country: Azerbaijan
  - District: Khojaly

Population (2015)
  - Total: 261
- Time zone: UTC+4 (AZT)

Khandzk (Armenian: Խանձք, also Khantsk, Խանցք) or Khanyeri (Azerbaijani: Xanyeri) is a village in the Khojaly District of Azerbaijan. in the region of Nagorno-Karabakh. Until 2023 it was controlled by the breakaway Republic of Artsakh. The village had an ethnic Armenian-majority population until the expulsion of the Armenian population of Nagorno-Karabakh by Azerbaijan following the 2023 Azerbaijani offensive in Nagorno-Karabakh.

== History ==
During the Soviet period, the village was a part of the Askeran District of the Nagorno-Karabakh Autonomous Oblast.

== Historical heritage sites ==
Historical heritage sites in and around the village include the 11th-century church of Vardapetin Khut (Armenian: Վարդապետին Խութ), the 12th/13th-century shrine of Jukhtak Khach (Armenian: Ջուխտակ խաչ), a 13th-century village, chapel and khachkar, the 13th-century St. John's Church (Armenian: Սուրբ Հովհաննես եկեղեցի, romanized: Surb Hovhannes Yekeghetsi), St. Stephen's Church (Armenian: Սուրբ Ստեփանոս եկեղեցի, romanized: Surb Stepanos Yekeghetsi) built in 1673, and a 19th-century spring monument.

== Economy and culture ==
The population is mainly engaged in agriculture and animal husbandry. As of 2015, the village has a municipal building, a house of culture, a school, two shops, and a medical centre.

== Demographics ==
The village has an ethnic Armenian-majority population, had 231 inhabitants in 2005, and 261 inhabitants in 2015.

== Gallery ==
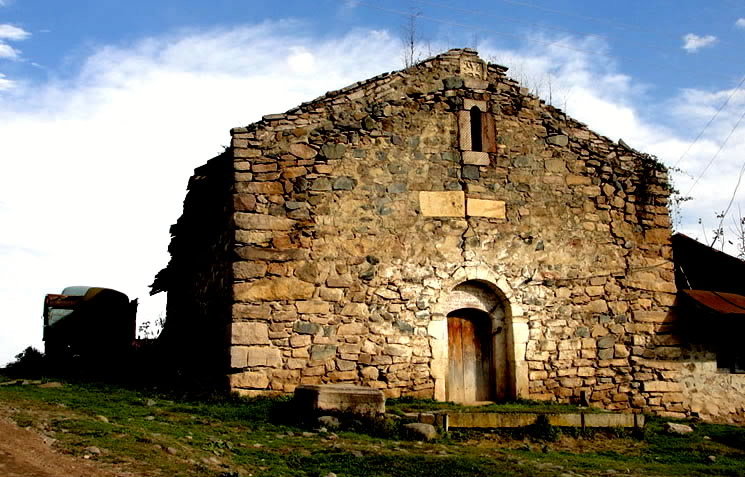
St. Stephen's Church

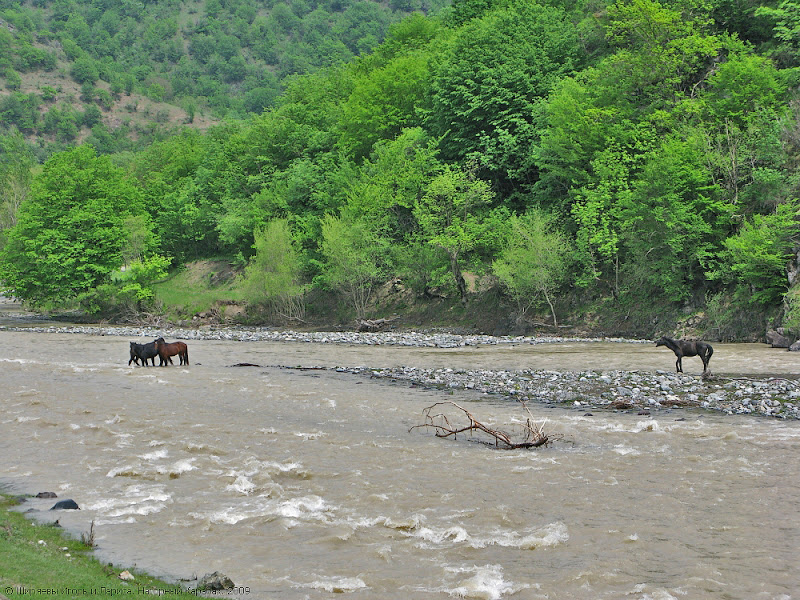
River
