= Karmirgyugh, Nagorno-Karabakh =

Karmirgyugh / Gyzyloba Կարմիրգյուղ / Qızıloba
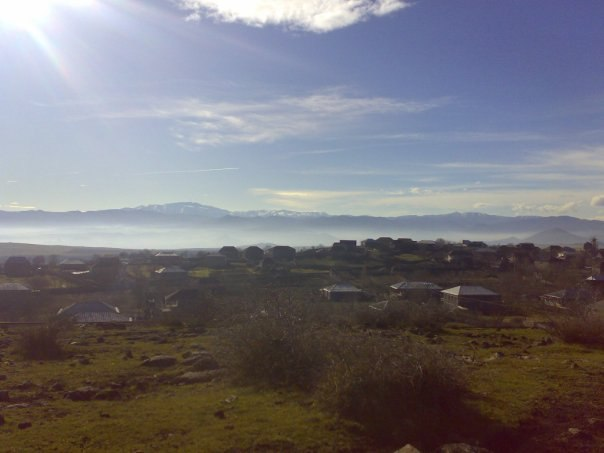
- A view of the village

- Location within Azerbaijan
- Coordinates: 39°46′06″N 46°51′02″E
- Country: Azerbaijan
  - District: Khojaly
- Elevation: 1,211 m (3,973 ft)

Population (2015)
  - Total: 171
- Time zone: UTC+4 (AZT)

Karmirgyugh (Armenian: Կարմիրգյուղ, lit. 'Red Village') or Gyzyloba (Azerbaijani: Qızıloba) is a village located in the Khojaly District of Azerbaijan, in the region of Nagorno-Karabakh. Until 2023 it was controlled by the breakaway Republic of Artsakh. The village had an ethnic Armenian-majority population until the expulsion of the Armenian population of Nagorno-Karabakh by Azerbaijan following the 2023 Azerbaijani offensive in Nagorno-Karabakh.

== History ==
During the Soviet period, the village was part of the Askeran District of the Nagorno-Karabakh Autonomous Oblast.

== Historical heritage sites ==
Historical heritage sites in and around the village include the 12th/13th-century Church of the Martyr (Armenian: Ըղեն նահատակ եկեղեցի, romanized: Yghen Nahatak Yekeghetsi), an 18th/19th-century cemetery, the church of Surb Astvatsatsin (Armenian: Սուրբ Աստվածածին, lit. 'Holy Mother of God') built in 1841, a spring monument from 1862, and a bridge built in 1864.

== Economy and culture ==
The population is mainly engaged in agriculture and animal husbandry. As of 2015, the village has a municipal building, a house of culture, a secondary school, and a medical centre.

== Demographics ==
The village has an ethnic Armenian-majority population. It had 174 inhabitants in 2005, and 171 inhabitants in 2015.

== Gallery ==
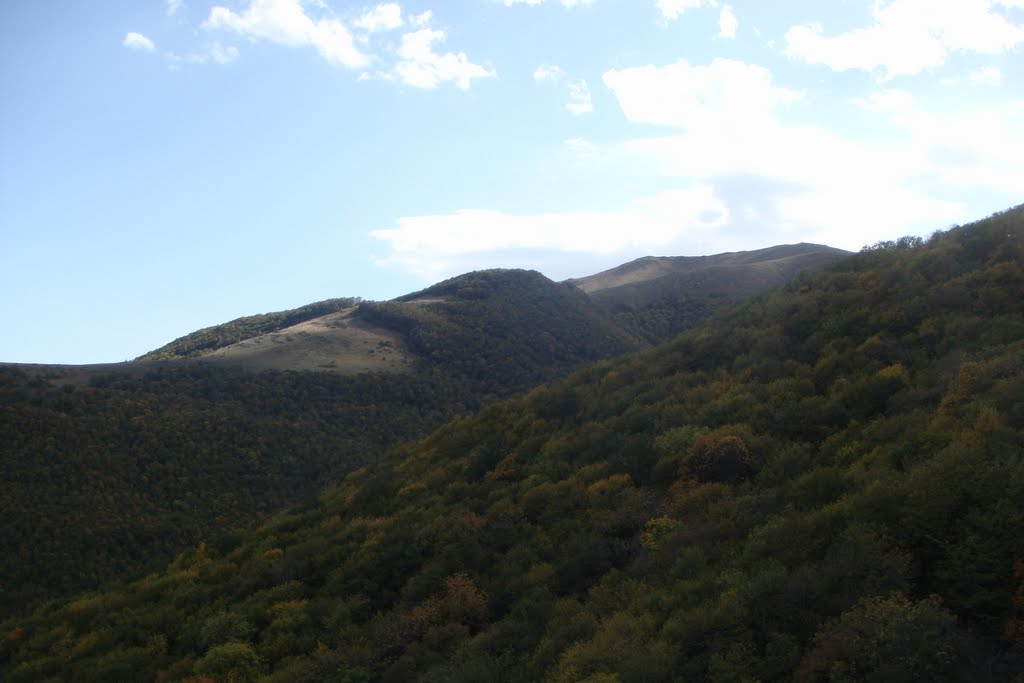
Scenery around the village

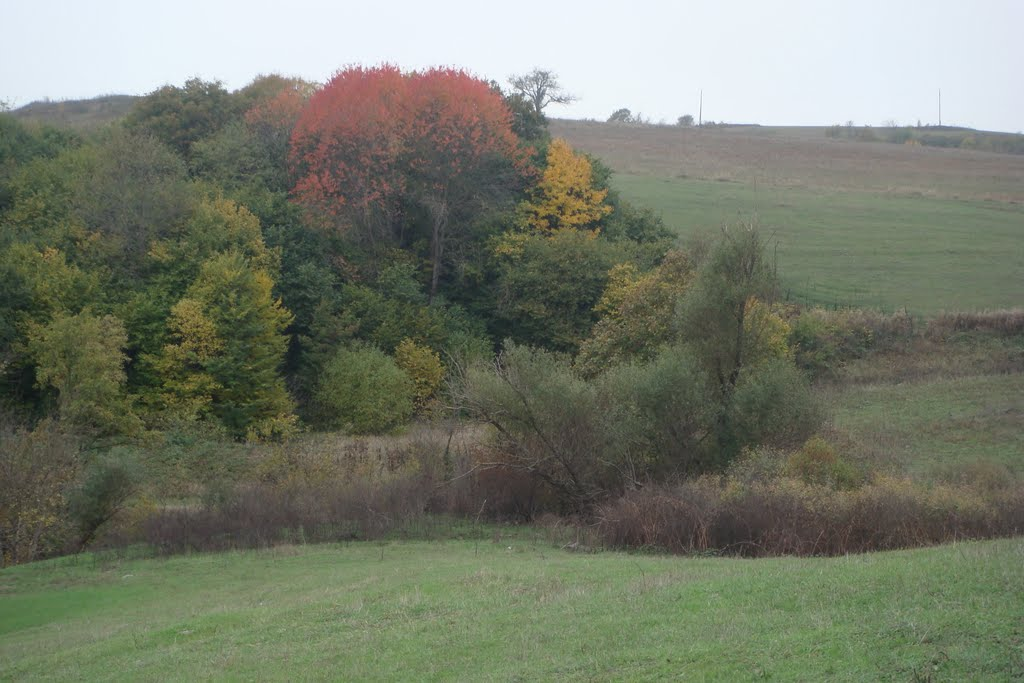
Nature around the village
