= Mülküdərə =

Mulkudara / Jraberd Mülküdərə / Ջրաբերդ
- Location within Azerbaijan
- Coordinates: 39°28′24″N 46°55′57″E
- Country: Azerbaijan
- District: Khojavend

Population (2015)
  - Total: 1
- Time zone: UTC+4 (AZT)

Mulkudara (Azerbaijani: Mülküdərə) or Jraberd (Armenian: Ջրաբերդ) is a village in the Khojavend District of Azerbaijan, in the disputed region of Nagorno-Karabakh. The village had an ethnic Armenian-majority population prior to the 2020 Nagorno-Karabakh war, and also had an Armenian majority in 1989.

== History ==
During the Soviet period, the village was part of the Hadrut District of the Nagorno-Karabakh Autonomous Oblast. After the First Nagorno-Karabakh War, the village was administrated as part of the Hadrut Province of the breakaway Republic of Artsakh. The village came under the control of Azerbaijan on 20 October 2020, during the 2020 Nagorno-Karabakh war.

== Demographics ==
The village had 2 inhabitants in 2005, and 1 inhabitant in 2015.
