= List of cities and towns in Artsakh =

Artsakh towns and villages
Artsakh towns and villages under Artsakh control before the 2023 Azerbaijani offensive in Nagorno-Karabakh, after the First Nagorno-Karabakh War and the 2020 Nagorno-Karabakh war.
Artsakh towns and villages that were part of the former Nagorno-Karabakh Autonomous Oblast (NKAO), as well as localities in the corridor between Armenia and Nagorno-Karabakh.
Artsakh towns and villages that were part of the former Nagorno-Karabakh Autonomous Oblast (NKAO), under the control of Azerbaijan after the First Nagorno-Karabakh War and the 2020 Nagorno-Karabakh war.
Artsakh localities outside of the former Nagorno-Karabakh Autonomous Oblast (NKAO), under the control of Azerbaijan after the First Nagorno-Karabakh War and the 2020 Nagorno-Karabakh war.

This is a list of cities, towns and villages formerly in the breakaway Republic of Artsakh.

In Artsakh, a city/town (Armenian: Քաղաք, romanized: K'aghak) was not defined by the size of its population. The municipalities in Artsakh weredivided into 2 categories: urban communities and rural communities. According to the 2015 Artsakh statistics, there were 13 urban communities and 322 rural communities in Artsakh.

A census detailing the population of all urban and rural communities was held in Artsakh in 2005, and a report containing demographic data, including population statistics for Artsakh urban and rural communities as of 2015, was compiled by Hakob Ghahramanyan, and published online by the Artsakh E-Library in 2018.

== Artsakh communities controlled by Artsakh until the 2023 Azerbaijani offensive in Nagorno-Karabakh ==
=== Urban communities ===
Rank	City/town	In Armenian	In Azerbaijani	Province	Population (2015 census)	Coat of arms	Image
1	Stepanakert	Ստեփանակերտ	Xankəndi	Stepanakert	55,200		
2	Martuni	Մարտունի	Xocavənd	Martuni	5,700		
3	Martakert	Մարտակերտ	Ağdərə	Martakert	4,600		
4	Chartar	Ճարտար	Çartar	Martuni	4,000		
5	Askeran	Ասկերան	Əsgəran	Askeran	2,300		

=== List of urban and rural communities by province ===
Map of the 2020 Nagorno-Karabakh ceasefire agreement Azerbaijan outside of the conflict zone Armenia Areas captured by Azerbaijan which remain under its control Agdam District was transferred to Azerbaijan on 20 November 2020 Kalbajar District was transferred to Azerbaijan on 25 November 2020 Lachin District was transferred to Azerbaijan on 1 December 2020 Part of Nagorno-Karabakh with no scheduled cession to Azerbaijan Lachin corridor was transferred to control of Russian peacekeepers on 1 December 2020 Access roads into Nagorno-Karabakh New Azerbaijani transport corridor to be established Line of contact before the 2020 conflict. Other areas claimed by Artsakh

Regions of Artsakh: 1: Martakert; 2: Askeran; 3: Stepanakert (city); 4: Martuni; 5: Shushi Claimed regions: 6: Hadrut; 7: Shahumyan (Areas shaded white indicate territory outside of the former Nagorno-Karabakh Autonomous Oblast and Shahumyan Region. Horizontal dashed lines indicate territory under the control of Azerbaijan.)

Map of Artsakh and surrounding territories. The area surrounded by red borders corresponds to territory de facto controlled by the Republic of Artsakh from 1994 until 2020. Yellow regions correspond to the Soviet-era Nagorno Karabakh Autonomous Oblast (NKAO), with yellow striped regions controlled by Azerbaijan but claimed by the Republic of Artsakh. Green striped regions correspond to territories outside the former NKAO de facto held by Artsakh following the end of the Nagorno-Karabakh War in 1994.

Regions of Artsakh prior to the 2020 war: 1: Martakert; 2: Askeran; 3: Stepanakert (city); 4: Martuni; 5: Shushi; 6: Hadrut; 7: Shahumyan; 8: Kashatagh (Vertical dashed lines indicate territory outside of the former Nagorno-Karabakh Autonomous Oblast and Shahumyan Region. Horizontal dashed lines indicate territory under the control of Azerbaijan before the war.)

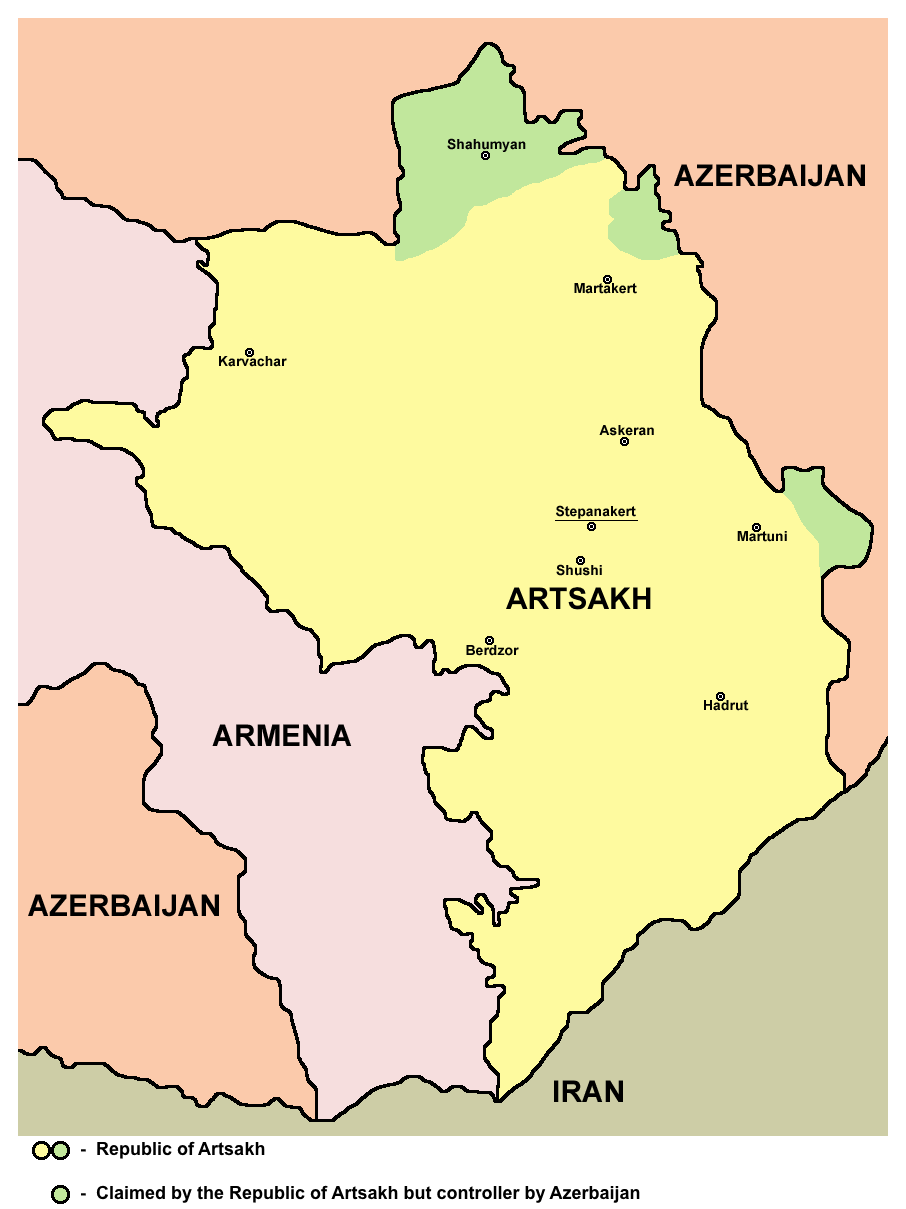
Main cities and towns in Artsakh

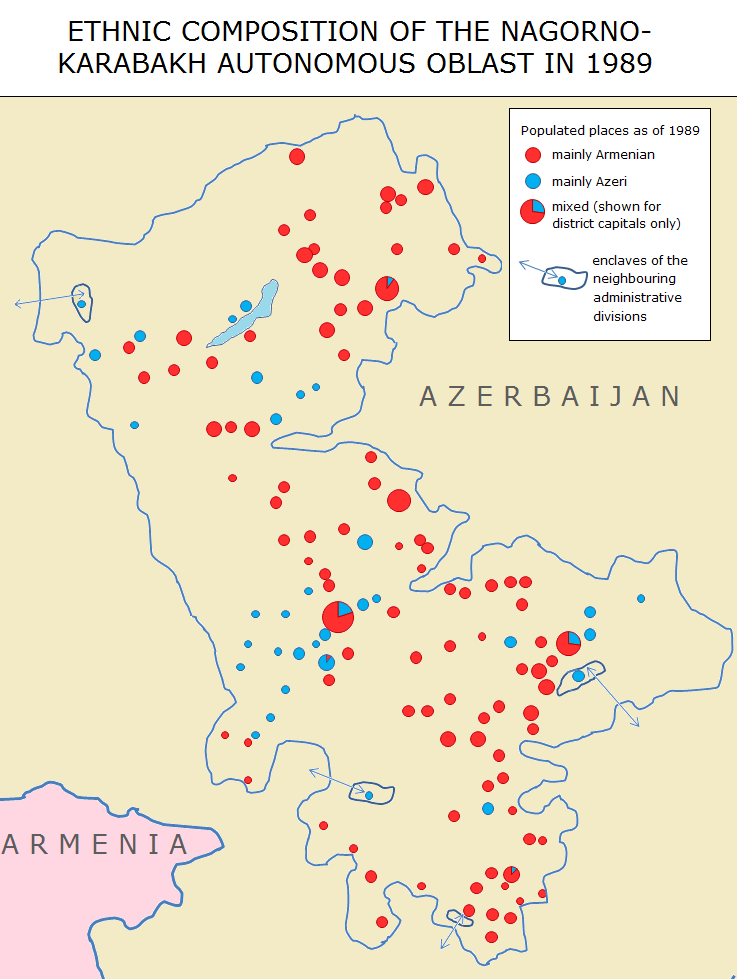
Ethnic composition of the Nagorno-Karabakh Autonomous Oblast in 1989, based on: Arthur Tsutsiev, Atlas of Ethno-Political History of the Caucasus, 1774-2004, Europa: Moscow, 2006.

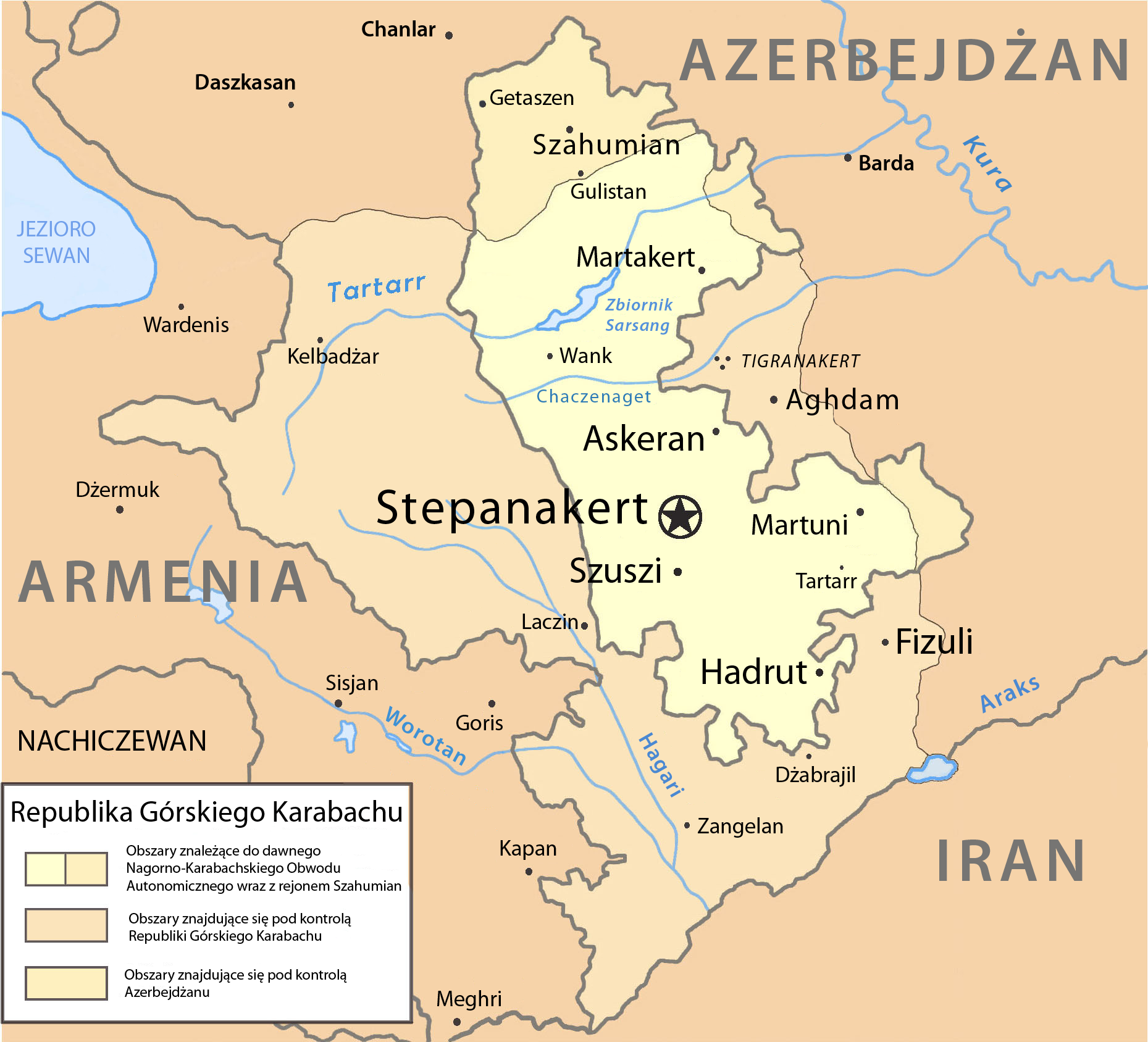
Map of Nagorno-Karabakh, with Stepanakert in the center.

==== Askeran Province ====
City/town/village	In Armenian	In Azerbaijani	Population	Image
Askeran	Ասկերան	Əsgəran	2,300	
Astghashen	Աստղաշեն	Daşbulaq	507	
Aygestan	Այգեստան	Ballıca	1,084	
Berkadzor	Բերքաձոր		195	
Dahrav	Դահրավ	Dəhrəv	179	
Dahraz	Դահրազ	Dəhrəz	5	
Dashushen	Դաշուշեն	Daşkənd	133	
Harav	Հարավ	Harov	324	
Hilis	Հիլիս	Qarakötük	180	
Hovsepavan	Հովսեփավան		176	
Ivanyan	Իվանյան	Xocalı	1,397	
Jamilli	Ջամիլլի	Cəmilli		
Karmirgyugh	Կարմիրգյուղ	Qızıloba	171	
Khachen	Խաչեն	Seyidbəyli	332	
Khachmach	Խաչմաչ	Xaçmaç	227	
Khandzk	Խանձք	Xanyeri	261	
Khnapat	Խնապատ	Xanabad	1,042	
Khnatsakh	Խնածախ	Xanyurdu	684	
Khndzristan	Խնձրիստան	Almalı	738	
Khramort	Խրամորթ	Pirlər	524	
Krasni	Քռասնի	Dağdağan	243	
Kyatuk	Քյաթուկ	Kətik	6	
Lusadzor	Լուսաձոր	Mehdibəyli	177	
Mkhitarashen	Մխիթարաշեն	Muxtar	91	
Nakhichevanik	Նախիջևանիկ	Naxçıvanlı	222	
Nerkin Sznek	Ներքին Սզնեք	Aşağı Yemişcan	131	
Noragyugh	Նորագյուղ	Təzəbinə	1,517	
Parukh	Փառուխ	Farux	72	
Patara	Պատարա	Badara	815	
Rev	Ռև	Şəlvə	110	
Sardarashen	Սարդարաշեն	Sərdarkənd	137	
Sarnaghbyur	Սառնաղբյուր	Ağbulaq	107	
Sarushen	Սարուշեն	Dağyürd	378	
Shosh	Շոշ	Şuşakənd	641	
Tsaghkashat	Ծաղկաշատ	Qışlaq	172	
Urakhach	ՈՒրախաչ	Ulubaba		
Varazabun	Վարազաբուն	Aranzəmin	38	
Vardadzor	Վարդաձոր	Pircamal	267	
Verin Sznek	Վերին Սզնեք	Yuxarı Yemişcan	33	

==== Kashatagh Province ====
City/town/village	In Armenian	In Azerbaijani	Population	Image
Aghanus	Աղանուս	Ağanus	40	
Maratuk	Մարաթուկ	Malxələf	18	
Meghvadzor	Մեղվաձոր	Mığıdərə	12	
Melikahogh	Մելիքահող	Məlikpəyə		

==== Martakert Province ====
City/town/village	In Armenian	In Azerbaijani	Population	Image
Aghabekalanj	Աղաբեկալանջ	Ağabəyyalı	168	
Arajadzor	Առաջաձոր	Dovşanlı	787	
Chankatagh	Ճանկաթաղ	Çanyataq	385	
Chapar	Չափար	Çapar	355	
Chldran	Չլդրան	Çıldıran	528	
Drmbon	Դրմբոն	Heyvalı	583	
Garnakar	Գառնաքար	Çormanlı	161	
Getavan	Գետավան	Qozlukörpü	331	
Ghazarahogh	Ղազարահող	Gazarahox	74	
Harutyunagomer	Հարությունագոմեր	Qızılqaya	517	
Haterk	Հաթերք	Hasanriz	1,638	
Imar	Իմար	İmarət Qərvənd		
Jraberd	Ջրաբերդ	Çiləbürt	88	
Khnkavan	Խնկավան	Xanqutala	193	
Kichan	Կիչան	Kiçan	178	
Kmkadzor	Քմքաձոր	Miqrelalay	116	
Kochoghot	Կոճողոտ	Yayıcı	547	
Kolatak	Քոլատակ	Kolatağ	250	
Kusapat	Կուսապատ	Qasapet	259	
Maghavuz	Մաղավուզ	Çardaqlı	540	
Martakert	Մարտակերտ	Ağdərə	4,600	
Mehmana	Մեհմանա	Mehmana	26	
Mets Shen	Մեծ Շեն	Ulu Qarabəy	341	
Mokhratagh	Մոխրաթաղ	Kiçik Qarabəy	341	
Nareshtar	Նարեշտար	Narınclar	4	
Nerkin Horatagh	Ներքին Հոռաթաղ	Aşağı Oratağ	840	
Nor Ghazanchi	Նոր Ղազանչի	Sırxavənd	143	
Poghosagomer	Պողոսագոմեր	Dəvədaşı	242	
Seysulan	Սեյսուլան	Seysulan		
Shahmasur	Շահմասուր	Şahmansurlu	148	
Tblghu	Թբլղու	Damğalı	158	
Tonashen	Տոնաշեն	Tonaşen	84	
Tsaghkashen	Ծաղկաշեն	Dəmirli	154	
Tsmakahogh	Ծմակահող	Bazarkənd	261	
Vaghuhas	Վաղուհաս	Qozlu	678	
Vank	Վանք	Vəngli	1,574	
Vardadzor	Վարդաձոր	Gülyataq	199	
Varnkatagh	Վարնկաթաղ	Lüləsaz	95	
Verin Horatagh	Վերին Հոռաթաղ	Yuxarı Oratağ	532	
Zaglik	Զագլիկ	Zəylik	235	
Zardakhach	Զարդախաչ	Zardaxaç	136	

==== Martuni Province ====
City/town/village	In Armenian	In Azerbaijani	Population	Image
Ashan	Աշան	Heşan	544	
Avdur	Ավդուռ	Avdur	127	
Berdashen	Բերդաշեն	Qarakənd	1,606	
Chartar	Ճարտար	Çartar	4,000	
Gishi	Գիշի	Kiş	1,115	
Haghorti	Հաղորտի	Kəndxurd	200	
Hatsi	Հացի	Çörəkli	234	
Herher	Հերհեր	Qarqar	584	
Kaghartsi	Կաղարծի	Qağartsi	306	
Kajavan	Քաջավան	Əmiranlar	99	
Kavahan	Կավահան	Gavahın	75	
Kakavadzor	Կաքավաձոր	Kuropatkino	30	
Karahunj	Քարահունջ	Qarazəmi	168	
Karmir Shuka	Կարմիր Շուկա	Qırmızı Bazar	1,113	
Kert	Քերթ	Quzumkənd	572	
Kherkhan	Խերխան	Xərxan	140	
Khnushinak	Խնուշինակ	Xanoba	615	
Kolkhozashen	Կոլխոզաշեն	Arpadüzü	241	
Machkalashen	Մաճկալաշեն	Cütcü	546	
Martuni	Մարտունի	Xocavənd	5,700	
Msmna	Մսմնա	Ağbulaq	100	
Mushkapat	Մուշկապատ	Müşkabad	372	
Myurishen	Մյուրիշեն	Mirikənd	160	
Nngi	Ննգի	Cəmiyyət	334	
Norshen	Նորշեն	Yenikənd	354	
Paravatumb	Պառավաթումբ	Qarıtəpə	140	
Skhtorashen	Սխտորաշեն	Şıx Dursun	19	
Sos	Սոս	Sos	1,089	
Spitakashen	Սպիտակաշեն	Ağkənd	453	
Taghavard	Թաղավարդ	Tağaverd	1,301	
Tsovategh	Ծովատեղ	Zavadıx	159	
Varanda	Վարանդա	Qaradağlı	110	
Yemishchan	Եմիշճան	Yemişcan	178	

==== Shahumyan Province ====
City/town/village	In Armenian	In Azerbaijani	Population	Image
Aknaberd	Ակնաբերդ	Umudlu	586	
Charektar	Չարեքտար	Çərəktar	262	

==== Shushi Province ====
City/town/village	In Armenian	In Azerbaijani	Population	Image
Ghaibalishen	Ղայբալիշեն	Qaybalı		
Hin Shen	Հին Շեն	Kiçik Qaladərəsi	190	
Hunanav	Հունանավ	Unannovu		
Kanach Tala	Կանաչ թալա	Göytala	16	
Lisagor	Լիսագոր	Turşsu	130	
Mets Shen	Մեծշեն	Böyük Qaladərəsi	116	
Tasy Verst	Տասը Վերստ	Onverst	4	
Yeghtsahogh	Եղցահող	Sarıbaba	118	

== Other Artsakh communities ==
=== Urban communities ===
Rank	City/town	In Armenian	In Azerbaijani	Province	Population (2015 census)	Coat of arms	Image
1	Shushi	Շուշի	Şuşa	Shushi	4,200		
2	Hadrut	Հադրութ	Hadrut	Hadrut	4,100		
3	Berdzor	Բերձոր	Laçın	Kashatagh	1,900		
4	Kashunik	Քաշունիք	Qubadlı	Kashatagh	600		
5	Karvachar	Քարվաճառ	Kəlbəcər	Shahumyan^{1}	600		
6	Kovsakan	Կովսական	Zəngilan	Kashatagh	500		
7	Zoravan (Nerkin Chartar)	Զորավան (Ներքին Ճարտար)		Martuni	400		
8	Mijnavan	Միջնավան	Mincivan	Kashatagh	300		

=== List of urban and rural communities by province ===
==== Askeran Province ====
City/town/village	In Armenian	In Azerbaijani	Population	Image
Akna	Ակնա	Ağdam		
Aknaghbyur	Ակնաղբյուր	Qarabulaq	612	
Armenakavan	Արմենակավան	Xaçındərbətli	83	
Avetaranots	Ավետարանոց	Çanaqçı	1,121	
Jraghatsner	Ջրաղացներ	Dəmirçilər	132	
Madatashen	Մադաթաշեն	Mədədkənd	104	
Moshkhmhat	Մոշխմհատ	Baharlı	64	
Sghnakh	Սղնախ	Sığnaq	292	
Ughtasar	Ուղտասար	Şelli	201	

==== Hadrut Province ====
City/town/village	In Armenian	In Azerbaijani	Population	Image
Aknaghbyur	Ակնաղբյուր	Ağbulaq	322	
Arajamugh	Առաջամուղ		117	
Arakel	Առաքել	Arakül	134	
Arevshat	Արևշատ	Dolanlar	211	
Arpagetik	Արփագետիկ	Arpagədik	24	
Aygestan	Այգեստան	Qoçbəyli	316	
Azokh	Ազոխ	Azıx	741	
Banadzor	Բանաձոր	Binədərəsi	175	
Drakhtik	Դրախտիկ	Zoğalbulaq	450	
Dzoragyugh	Ձորագյուղ	Yuxarı Məzrə	39	
Hadrut	Հադրութ	Hadrut	4,100	
Hakaku	Հակակու	Ağdam	142	
Hartashen	Հարթաշեն	Axullu	91	
Haykavan	Հայկավան	Sirik	70	
Hin Tagher	Հին Թաղլար	Köhnə Tağlar	96	
Hogher	Հողեր	Üçbulaq	4	
Ijevanatun	Իջեւանատուն	Qarğabazar		
Jraberd	Ջրաբերդ	Mülküdərə	1	
Jrakan	Ջաբրայիլ	Cəbrayil		
Jrakus	Ջրակուս	Çiraquz	238	
Karaglukh	Քարագլուխ	Daşbaşı		
Karmrakuch	Կարմրակուճ	Kəmərtük	145	
Khalynbulakh		Xatınbulaq		
Khandzadzor	Խանձաձոր	Ağcakənd	122	
Khtsaberd	Խծաբերդ	Çaylaqqala	120	
Kovshat		Govşatlı		
Kyuratagh	Քյուրաթաղ	Düdükçü	321	
Mariamadzor	Մարիամաձոր	Məmməddərə	245	
Melikashen	Մելիքաշեն	Məlikcanlı	11	
Mets Tagher	Մեծ Թաղեր	Böyük Tağlar	1,509	
Mokhrenes	Մոխրենես	Susanlıq	180	
Norashen	Նորաշեն	Günəşli	159	
Petrosashen	Պետրոսաշեն			
Pletants	Պլեթանց	Bulutan	28	
Saralanj	Սարալանջ	Cilən	27	
Sarinshen	Սարինշեն	Şahyeri	15	
Spitakashen	Սպիտակշեն	Spitakşen	11	
Taghaser	Թաղասեռ	Tağaser	434	
Taghut	Թաղուտ	Ataqut	205	
Togh	Տող	Tuğ	756	
Tumi	Տումի	Binə	746	
Tsaghkavank	Ծաղկավանք	Xırmancıq	4	
Tsakuri	Ծակուռի	Hünərli	109	
Tsamdzor	Ծամձոր	Dərəkənd	47	
Tsor	Ցոր	Sor	20	
Tyak	Տյաք	Dağdöşü	70	
Ukhtadzor	Ուխտաձոր	Edilli	309	
Vank	Վանք	Çinarlı	122	
Varanda	Վարանդա	Füzuli		
Vardashat	Վարդաշատ	Edişa	162	

==== Kashatagh Province ====
City/town/village	In Armenian	In Azerbaijani	Population	Image
Aghadzor	Աղաձոր	Üçüncü Ağalı	110	
Aghavnatun	Աղավնատուն	Quşçular	36	
Aghavno	Աղավնո	Zabux	175	
Aghbradzor	Աղբրաձոր	Korcabulaq	6	
Alashkert	Ալաշկերտ	Qıraq Müşlan	126	
Amiryan	Ամիրյան	Sarıl	34	
Amutegh	Ամուտեղ	Başarat		
Ani	Անի	Qoşasu	34	
Antaramej	Անտառամեջ	Bülövlük	10	
Aparan	Ապարան	Fətəlipəyə	28	
Arakhish	Արախիշ	Ərikli	12	
Artashavi	Արտաշավի	Ərdəşəvi	127	
Arjadzor	Արջաձոր	Ağcayazı	4	
Artsakhamayr	Արցախամայր	Rəzdərə	4	
Artsvashen	Արծվաշեն	Kürd Mahruzlu	109	
Arvakan	Արվական	Alxaslı	61	
Aygehovit	Այգեհովիտ	Balasoltanlı	151	
Aygek	Այգեկ	Əfəndilər	94	
Bazmatus	Բազմատուս	Bülüldüz	37	
Berdik	Բերդիկ	Qalaça	25	
Berdzor	Բերձոր	Laçın	1,900	
Chormank	Չորմանկ	Çorman	14	
Ditsmayri	Դիցմայրի	Məşədiismayıllı	94	
Drakhtadzor	Դրախտաձոր	Ağcakənd	44	
Dzorap	Ձորափ	Qarakişilər	121	
Gahanist	Գահանիստ	Lolabağırlı	5	
Gandza	Գանձա	Seyidlər	58	
Getamej	Գետամեջ	Həmzəli	106	
Getap	Գետափ	Qarağac	124	
Ghazarapat	Ղազարապատ	Alıqulu	63	
Gihut	Գիհուտ	Mollalar	46	
Goghtanik	Գողթանիկ	Pircahan	103	
Hak	Հակ	Minkend	86	
Hakari	Հակարի	Muradxanlı	119	
Hale	Հալե	Hal	32	
Harar	Հարար	Aşağı Fərəcan	44	
Haykazyan	Հայկազյան	Qəzyan	74	
Haytagh	Հայթաղ	Qorçu	8	
Herik	Հերիկ	Əhmədli	50	
Himnashen	Հիմնաշեն	İmanlar	38	
Hochants	Հոչանց	Hoçaz	56	
Ishkhanadzor	Իշխանաձոր	Xanlıq	204	
Janfida	Ջանֆիդա	Diləli Müskənli	80	
Karabak	Քարաբակ	Qarabəyli		
Karegah	Քարեգահ	Qarıkaha	184	
Karotan	Քարոտան	Kavdadıq	68	
Karut	Քարուտ	Daşlı	12	
Kashunik	Քաշունիք	Qubadlı	600	
Keren	Կերեն	Qaragöl	38	
Khachgetik	Խաչգետիկ	Səfiyan	47	
Khachintap	Խաչինտափ	Xaçınyalı	3	
Kovsakan	Կովսական	Zəngilan	500	
Krmen	Կրմեն	Xumarlı	45	
Kumayri	Կումայրի	Qilican	70	
Leharnovit	Լեռնահովիտ	Qarakeçdi	56	
Lchashen	Լճաշեն	Çullu	8	
Mamark	Մամարք	Məmər	46	
Margis	Մարգիս	Mayıs	12	
Martiros	Մարտիրոս	Arduşlu	1	
Martunashen	Մարտունաշեն	Qaracallı	76	
Melikashen	Մելիքաշեն	Malıbəy	51	
Mijnavan	Միջնավան	Mincivan	300	
Mirik	Միրիկ	Mirik	179	
Mkhants	Մխանց	Muğanlı	94	
Moshatagh	Մոշաթաղ	Bozlu	211	
Mush	Մուշ	Məlikli	118	
Movsesashen	Մովսեսաշեն	Kürdhacı	19	
Msheni	Մշենի	Mişni	92	
Norashenik	Նորաշենիկ	Təzəkənd	78	
Pakahan	Փակահան	Xocahan	168	
Saratak	Սարատակ	Sarıyataq	123	
Shalua	Շալուա	Şəlvə	55	
Shirak	Շիրակ	Qiyaslı	55	
Shrvakan	Շրվական	Şeylanlı	24	
Sonasar	Սոնասար	Sonasar	89	
Spitakajur	Սպիտակաջուր	Ağbulaq	45	
Suaras	Սուարաս	Suarası	8	
Sus	Սուս	Sus	26	
Tandzut	Տանձուտ	Qarıqışlaq	103	
Tigranavan	Տիգրանավան	Padar	162	
Tovmasar	Թովմասար	Dağ Tumas	6	
Tsaghkaberd	Ծաղկաբերդ	Güləbird	221	
Tsitsernavank	Ծիծեռնավանք	Hüsülü	113	
Tsobadzor	Ծոբաձոր	Çöpədərə	15	
Urekan	Ուռեկան	İşıqlı	168	
Urmia	Ուրմիա	Qızılca	2	
Vaghazin	Վաղազին	Vağazin	53	
Vakunis	Վակունիս	Piçənis	68	
Van	Վան	Cahangirbəyli	129	
Vardabats	Վարդաբաց	Əbilcə	59	
Vardanants	Վարդանանծ	Məmmədbəyli		
Vazgenashen	Վազգենաշեն	Hacısamlı	23	
Verin Kashunik	Վերին Քաշունիք	Yuxarı Mollu	23	
Vordnav	Որդնավ	Zərnəli		
Vurgavan	Վուրգավան	Xəndək	135	
Yeritsvank	Երիցվանք	Birinci Alıbəyli	241	
Zoratsik	Զորացիք	Hacıxanlı		

==== Martakert Province ====
City/town/village	In Armenian	In Azerbaijani	Population	Image
Andzavner	Անձավներ	Zağalar	8	
Aygestan	Այգեստան	Çaylı		
Dashtaglukh	Դաշտագլուխ	Taxtabaşı	5	
Haykajur	Հայկաջուր	Həsənqaya		
Hovtashen	Հովտաշեն	Əliağalı	275	
Karmiravan	Կարմիրավան	Qızıloba		
Levonarkh	Լեւոնարխ	Göyarx		
Mataghis	Մատաղիս	Suqovuşan	665	
Maragha	Մարաղա	Şıxarx		
Nor Aygestan	Նոր Այգեստան	Mollalar	281	
Nor Haykajur	Նոր Հայկաջուր	Boyəhmədli	194	
Nor Karmiravan	Նոր Կարմիրավան	Papravənd	195	
Nor Maragha	Նոր Մարաղա	Qızıl Kəngərli	529	
Nor Seysulan	Նոր Սեյսուլան	Yeni Qaralar	179	
Talish	Թալիշ	Talış	597	

==== Martuni Province ====
City/town/village	In Armenian	In Azerbaijani	Population	Image
Jivani	Ջիվանի	Qacar	198	
Sargsashen	Սարգսաշեն	Çağadüz	285	
Shekher	Շեխեր	Şəkər	407	
Vazgenashen	Վազգենաշեն	Gülablı	306	
Zardanashen	Զարդանաշեն	Zərdanaşen	101	
Zoravan (Nerkin Chartar)	Զորավան (Ներքին Ճարտար)		400	

==== Shahumyan Province ====
City/town/village	In Armenian	In Azerbaijani	Population	Image
Chumen	Ճումեն	Comərd	3	
Dadivank	Դադիվանք	Vəng	136	
Havsatagh	Հավսաթաղ	Almalıq	111	
Jermajur	Ջերմաջուր	İstisu		
Karvachar	Քարվաճառ	Kəlbəcər	600	
Knaravan	Քնարավան		76	
Nor Brajur	Նոր Բրաջուր	Qılınclı	239	
Nor Erkej	Նոր Էրքեջ	Bağlıpəyə	159	
Nor Getashen	Նոր Գետաշեն	Nadirxanlı	267	
Nor Karachinar	Նոր Կարաչինար	Seyidlər	123	
Nor Kharkhaput	Նոր Խարխափուտ	Qanlıkənd	107	
Nor Manashid	Նոր Մանաշիդ	Sınıqkilsə	97	
Nor Verinshen	Նոր Վերինշեն	Çaykənd	267	
Tsar	Ծար	Zar	83	
Yeghegnut	Եղեգնուտ	Qamışlı	249	
Zuar	Զուար	Zülfüqarlı	103	

==== Shushi Province ====
City/town/village	In Armenian	In Azerbaijani	Population	Image
Karin Tak	Քարին Տակ	Daşaltı	660	
Kirsavan	Քիրսավան	Köhnəkənd	86	
Shushi	Շուշի	Şuşa	4,064	

=== Shahumyan district and Getashen subdistrict ===
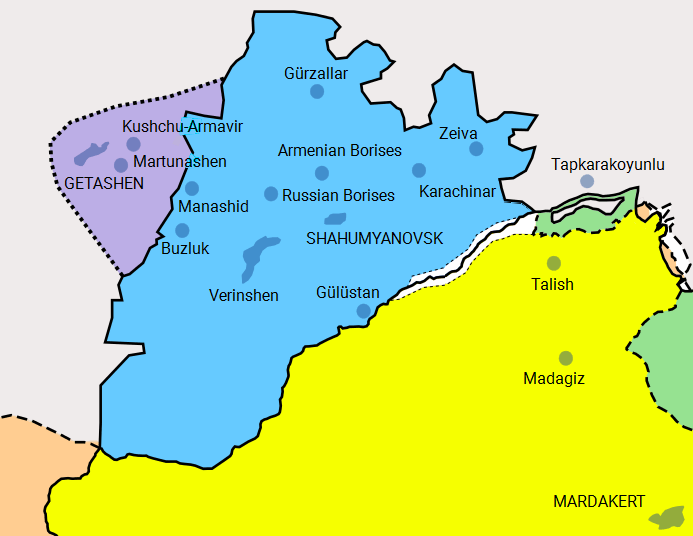
Former Soviet Shahumyan district and the territory known as "Getashen subdistrict" where the Artsakh Shahumyan Province was originally formed

The following list details towns in the Soviet Shahumyan district and Getashen subdistrict that are controlled by Azerbaijan since the First Nagorno-Karabakh war and Operation Ring. Armenians constituted 73.2% of the population of the Shahumyan district in 1979, and the majority of the villages within the Shahumyan district and the Getashen subdistrict had an Armenian majority prior to the First Nagorno-Karabakh war and Operation Ring, with exception for some Azerbaijani-majority villages (as well as some smaller localities), which are mentioned as such in the following list. The Shahumyan district and Getashen subdistrict are claimed by the Republic of Artsakh as part of the Shahumyan Province.

Approximately 17,000 Armenians living in the Shahumyan and Getashen districts were deported out of the region in 1991 during Operation Ring.

==== Shahumyan district ====
City/town/village	In Armenian	In Azerbaijani	Population	Image
Başqışlaq (Azerbaijani majority)		Başqışlaq		
Buzluk	Բուզլուկ	Buzluq		
Erkej	Էրքեջ	Erkeç		
Gürzallar (Azerbaijani majority)		Gürzallar		
Gyulistan	Գյուլիստան	Gülüstan		
Hay Borisner	Հայ Բորիսներ	Börü		
Karachinar	Կարաչինար	Qaraçinar		
Kharkhaput	Խարխապուտ	Meşəli		
Menashen	Մենաշեն	Mənəşli		
Rus Borisi				
Shafak	Շաֆակ	Şəfəq		
Shahumyan	Շահումյան	Aşağı Ağcakənd		
Todan (Azerbaijani majority)		Todan		
Verinshen	Վերինշեն	Yuxarı Ağcakənd		
Zeiva (Azerbaijani majority)		Zeyvə		

==== Getashen subdistrict ====
City/town/village	In Armenian	In Azerbaijani	Population	Image
Azat	Ազատ	Yeni Zod		
Getashen	Գետաշեն	Çaykənd		
Kamo	Կամո	Kamo		
Kushchi-Armavir	Կուշչի Արմավիր	Quşçu		
Martunashen	Մարտունաշեն	Qarabulaq		
Sarısu (Azerbaijani majority)		Sarısu		

== See also ==
- Armenians in Azerbaijan
- First Nagorno-Karabakh War
- List of cities and towns in Armenia
- List of settlements in Armenia
- Operation Ring
- Second Nagorno-Karabakh War
- Shahumyan Province
- 2020 Nagorno-Karabakh ceasefire agreement
