= Mığıdərə =

Mighidara / Meghvadzor Mığıdərə / Մեղվաձոր
- Location within Azerbaijan Location within East Zangezur Economic Region
- Coordinates: 39°34′33″N 46°36′49″E
- Country: Azerbaijan
- District: Lachin

Population (2015)
  - Total: 12
- Time zone: UTC+4

Mighidara (Azerbaijani: Mığıdərə) or Meghvadzor (Armenian: Մեղվաձոր) is a village in the Lachin District of Azerbaijan. Prior to October 2023, the village was located in the new corridor between Armenia and Nagorno-Karabakh, controlled by Russian peacekeepers, that replaced the Lachin corridor in August 2022.

== History ==
The village was located in the Armenian-occupied territories surrounding Nagorno-Karabakh, coming under the control of ethnic Armenian forces during the First Nagorno-Karabakh War in the early 1990s, subsequently becoming part of the breakaway Republic of Artsakh as part of its Kashatagh Province. The village was returned to Azerbaijan as part of the 2020 Nagorno-Karabakh ceasefire agreement.
