= Xəndək, Qubadli =

Xəndək
- Location within Azerbaijan
- Coordinates: 39°24′50″N 46°39′05″E
- Country: Azerbaijan
- District: Qubadli

Population (2015)
  - Total: 135
- Time zone: UTC+4 (AZT)

Xəndək (Khandak) is a village in the Qubadli District of Azerbaijan.

== History ==
The village was located in the Armenian-occupied territories surrounding Nagorno-Karabakh, coming under the control of ethnic Armenian forces during the First Nagorno-Karabakh War in the early 1990s. The village subsequently became part of the breakaway Republic of Artsakh as part of its Kashatagh Province, referred to as Vurgavan (Armenian: Վուրգավան). It was recaptured by Azerbaijan during the 2020 Nagorno-Karabakh war.
