= Salim Salimov =

Salim Salimov may refer to:

- Salim Salimov (boxer) (1982–2025), Bulgarian Olympic boxer
- Salim Salimov (politician) (1941–2024), Azerbaijani politician
