= Kavdadıq =

- Location within Azerbaijan
- Coordinates: 39°14′14″N 46°42′35″E
- Country: Azerbaijan
- District: Qubadli

Population (2015)
  - Total: 68
- Time zone: UTC+4 (AZT)

Kavdadıq (Kavdadyg) is a village in the Qubadli District of Azerbaijan.

== History ==
The village was located in the Armenian-occupied territories surrounding Nagorno-Karabakh, coming under the control of ethnic Armenian forces in 1993 during the First Nagorno-Karabakh War. The village subsequently became part of the breakaway Republic of Artsakh as part of its Kashatagh Province, referred to as Karotan (Armenian: Քարոտան). It was recaptured by Azerbaijan on or around October 30, 2020 during the 2020 Nagorno-Karabakh war.
