= Mollalar, Lachin =

Mollalar
- Location within Azerbaijan Location within East Zangezur Economic Region
- Coordinates: 39°40′02″N 46°29′24″E
- Country: Azerbaijan
- District: Lachin

Population (2015)
  - Total: 46
- Time zone: UTC+4 (AZT)

Mollalar is a village in the Lachin District of Azerbaijan. Close by is the ghost town of Kizilja.

== History ==
The village was located in the Armenian-occupied territories surrounding Nagorno-Karabakh, coming under the control of ethnic Armenian forces during the First Nagorno-Karabakh War in the early 1990s. The village subsequently became part of the breakaway Republic of Artsakh as part of its Kashatagh Province, referred to as Gihut (Armenian: Գիհուտ). The Armenian inhabitants of the village worked in agriculture and livestock. It was returned to Azerbaijan as part of the 2020 Nagorno-Karabakh ceasefire agreement.
