= Ağanus =

Aghanus Ağanus Աղանուս
- Location within Azerbaijan Location within East Zangezur Economic Region
- Coordinates: 39°37′03.0″N 46°34′24.9″E
- Country: Azerbaijan
- District: Lachin

Population (2015)
  - Total: 40
- Time zone: UTC+4

Aghanus (Azerbaijani: Ağanus; Armenian: Աղանուս) is a village in the Lachin District of Azerbaijan.

== History ==
The village was located in the Armenian-occupied territories surrounding Nagorno-Karabakh, coming under the control of ethnic Armenian forces during the First Nagorno-Karabakh War in the early 1990s, subsequently becoming part of the breakaway Republic of Artsakh as part of its Kashatagh Province. The village was returned to Azerbaijan as part of the 2020 Nagorno-Karabakh ceasefire agreement.

On August 10, 2022, the Minister of Territorial Administration and Infrastructure of the former breakaway state of Nagorno Karabakh Hayk Khanumyan announced that the village would be located in the new corridor between Armenia and Nagorno-Karabakh, controlled by Russian peacekeepers, that replaced the Lachin corridor that same month.
