= Pircahan =

- Location within Azerbaijan Location within East Zangezur Economic Region
- Coordinates: 39°43′43″N 46°26′00″E
- Country: Azerbaijan
- District: Lachin

Population (2015)
  - Total: 103
- Time zone: UTC+4 (AZT)

Pircahan (Pirjahan) is a village in the Lachin District of Azerbaijan.

== History ==
The village was located in the Armenian-occupied territories surrounding Nagorno-Karabakh, coming under the control of ethnic Armenian forces during the First Nagorno-Karabakh War in the early 1990s. The village subsequently became part of the breakaway Republic of Artsakh as part of its Kashatagh Province, referred to as Goghtanik (Armenian: Գողթանիկ). It was returned to Azerbaijan as part of the 2020 Nagorno-Karabakh ceasefire agreement.

== Historical heritage sites ==
Historical heritage sites in and around the village include the bridge of Kotrats (Armenian: Կոտրած), a 12th-century khachkar, a 13th-century khachkar, a 17th/18th-century khachkar, and an 18th-century khachkar.

== Demographics ==
The village had 86 inhabitants in 2005, and 103 inhabitants in 2015.
