= Sonasar, Azerbaijan =

Sonasar
- Location within Azerbaijan Location within East Zangezur Economic Region
- Coordinates: 39°41′55″N 46°24′57″E
- Country: Azerbaijan
- District: Lachin

Population (2015)
  - Total: 89
- Time zone: UTC+4 (AZT)

Sonasar (Armenian: Սոնասար) is a village in the Lachin District of Azerbaijan.

== History ==
The village was mentioned by the 13th-century Armenian historian Stepanos Orbelian as Dziasar (Armenian: Ձիասար). There was an ancient Armenian church in the village, which was used by the village's Kurdish population in the late 19th century as a shed, and has been left completely ruined in the present-day.

The village was located in the Armenian-occupied territories surrounding Nagorno-Karabakh, coming under the control of ethnic Armenian forces during the First Nagorno-Karabakh War in the early 1990s. The village subsequently became part of the breakaway Republic of Artsakh as part of its Kashatagh Province. It was returned to Azerbaijan as part of the 2020 Nagorno-Karabakh ceasefire agreement.

== Historical heritage sites ==
Historical heritage sites in and around the village include a grave field from the 2nd century BCE, a khachkar on a pedestal from 1056, an 11th-century khachkar, a bridge from between the 11th and 13th centuries, a cemetery from between the 12th and 18th centuries, a 14th-century khachkar, two 14th-century tombstones, a 17th-century inscription, and a 17th-century chapiter.
