= Fətəlipəyə =

Village in Azerbaijan

- Location within Azerbaijan Location within East Zangezur Economic Region
- Coordinates: 39°36′08″N 46°34′17″E
- Country: Azerbaijan
- District: Lachin

Population (2015)
  - Total: 28
- Time zone: UTC+4 (AZT)

Fətəlipəyə (Azerbaijani pronunciation: [fætælipæˈjæ]) is a village in the Lachin District of Azerbaijan.

== History ==
The village was located in the Armenian-occupied territories surrounding Nagorno-Karabakh, coming under the control of ethnic Armenian forces on May 19, 1992 during the First Nagorno-Karabakh War. The village subsequently became part of the breakaway Republic of Artsakh as part of its Kashatagh Province, where it was known as Aparan (Armenian: Ապարան) from June 26, 1998. The village was returned to Azerbaijan as part of the 2020 Nagorno-Karabakh ceasefire agreement.

== Historical heritage sites ==
Historical heritage sites in and around the village include a cave from between the 8th and 3rd centuries BCE.

== Demographics ==
The village was settled in 1996 with Armenian refugees deported from Azerbaijan. The village had 31 inhabitants in 2005, and 28 inhabitants in 2015, being engaged mainly in agriculture and animal husbandry.
