= Vağazin =

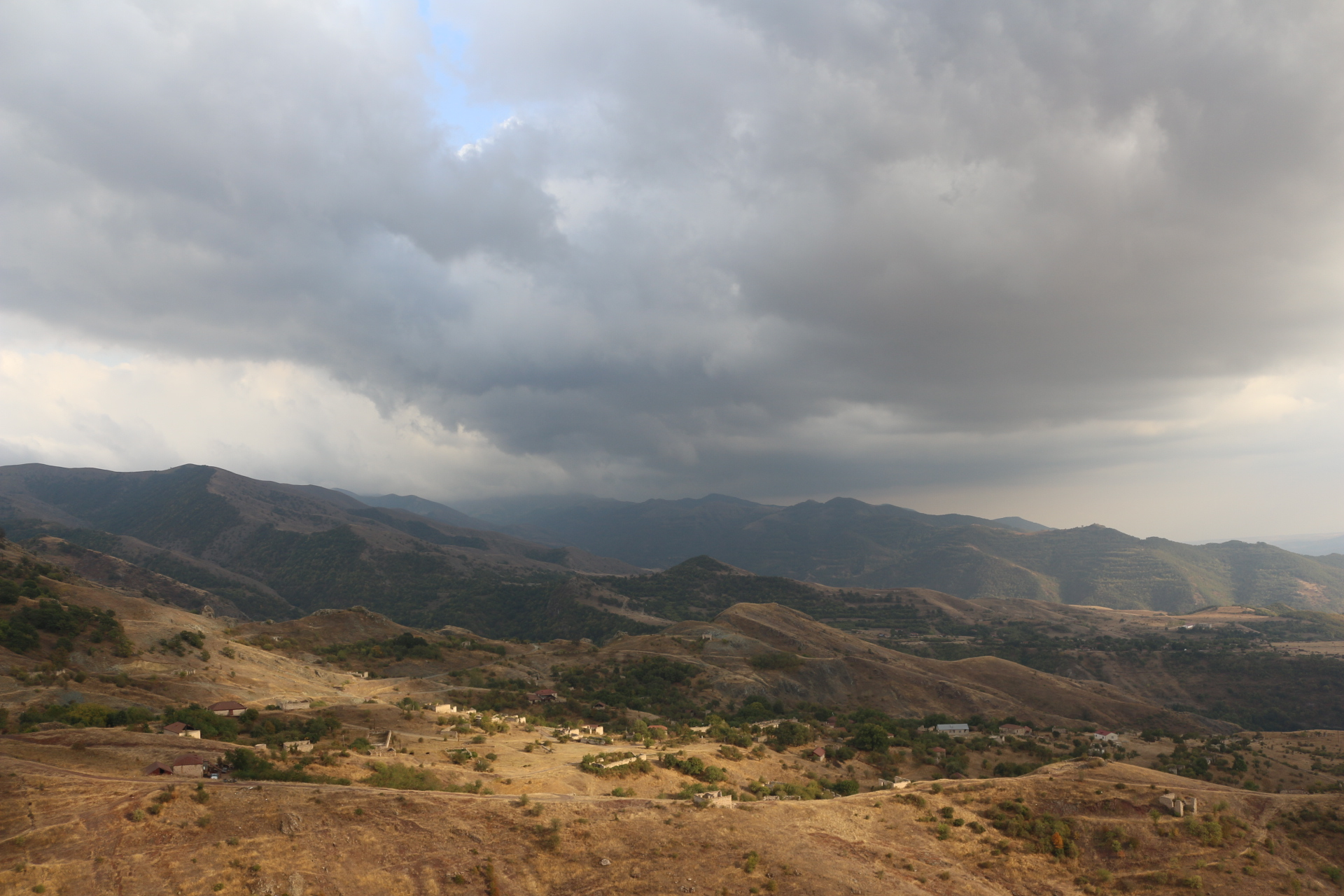

- Location within Azerbaijan Location within East Zangezur Economic Region
- Coordinates: 39°46′37″N 46°28′50″E
- Country: Azerbaijan
- District: Lachin

Population (2015)
  - Total: 53
- Time zone: UTC+4 (AZT)

Vaghazin (Azerbaijani: Vağazin; Armenian: Վաղազին) is a village in the Lachin District of Azerbaijan.

== History ==
The village was located in the Armenian-occupied territories surrounding Nagorno-Karabakh, coming under the control of ethnic Armenian forces during the First Nagorno-Karabakh War in the early 1990s. The village subsequently became part of the breakaway Republic of Artsakh as part of its Kashatagh Province. It was returned to Azerbaijan as part of the 2020 Nagorno-Karabakh ceasefire agreement.

== Demographics ==
The village had 58 inhabitants in 2005, and 53 inhabitants in 2015.
