= Seyidlər, Lachin =

Seyidlər
- Location within Azerbaijan Location within East Zangezur Economic Region
- Coordinates: 39°42′21″N 46°27′55″E
- Country: Azerbaijan
- District: Lachin

Population (2015)
  - Total: 58
- Time zone: UTC+4 (AZT)

Seyidlər (Seyidlar) is a village in the Lachin District of Azerbaijan.

== History ==
The village was located in the Armenian-occupied territories surrounding Nagorno-Karabakh, coming under the control of ethnic Armenian forces during the First Nagorno-Karabakh War in the early 1990s. The village subsequently became part of the breakaway Republic of Artsakh as part of its Kashatagh Province, where it was known as Gandza (Armenian: Գանձա). It was returned to Azerbaijan as part of the 2020 Nagorno-Karabakh ceasefire agreement.

== Historical heritage sites ==
Historical heritage sites in and around the village include a 17th-century bridge, a 17th/18th-century spring monument, and an 18th/19th-century watermill.
