= Salim Salimov (politician) =

Azerbaijani politician (1941–2024)

Selim Selimov

Member of the Supreme Soviet of the Azerbaijan Republic for Lachin District
- In office 14 October 1990 – 12 November 1995

Personal details
- Born: Səlim Səlimov; 11 October 1941 Xaçınyalı, Azerbaijan SSR, USSR
- Died: 23 March 2024 (aged 82) Baku, Azerbaijan
- Party: ACP
- Education: Baku State University; Baku Higher Party School
- Occupation: Schoolteacher

Selim Selimov (Azerbaijani: Səlim Səlimov; 11 October 1941 – 23 March 2024) was an Azerbaijani politician. A member of the Azerbaijan Communist Party, he served in the Supreme Soviet of the Azerbaijan Republic from 1990 to 1995.

Selimov died in Baku on 23 March 2024, at the age of 82.
