= Qacar, Fuzuli =

Qacar
- Location within Azerbaijan
- Coordinates: 39°39′03″N 47°03′23″E
- Country: Azerbaijan
- District: Fuzuli

Population (2015)
  - Total: 198
- Time zone: UTC+4 (AZT)

Qacar (Qajar) is a village in the Fuzuli District of Azerbaijan.

== History ==
The village was located in the Armenian-occupied territories surrounding Nagorno-Karabakh, coming under the control of ethnic Armenian forces during the First Nagorno-Karabakh War in the early 1990s. The village subsequently became part of the breakaway Republic of Artsakh as part of its Martuni Province, referred to as Jivani (Armenian: Ջիվանի). It was recaptured by Azerbaijan on November 7, 2020 during the 2020 Nagorno-Karabakh war.

== Notable people ==
- Bashir Karimov — National Hero of Azerbaijan.
