= Khnushinak =

Village in Khojavend District, Nagorno-Karabakh

Khnushinak Խնուշինակ Xanoba
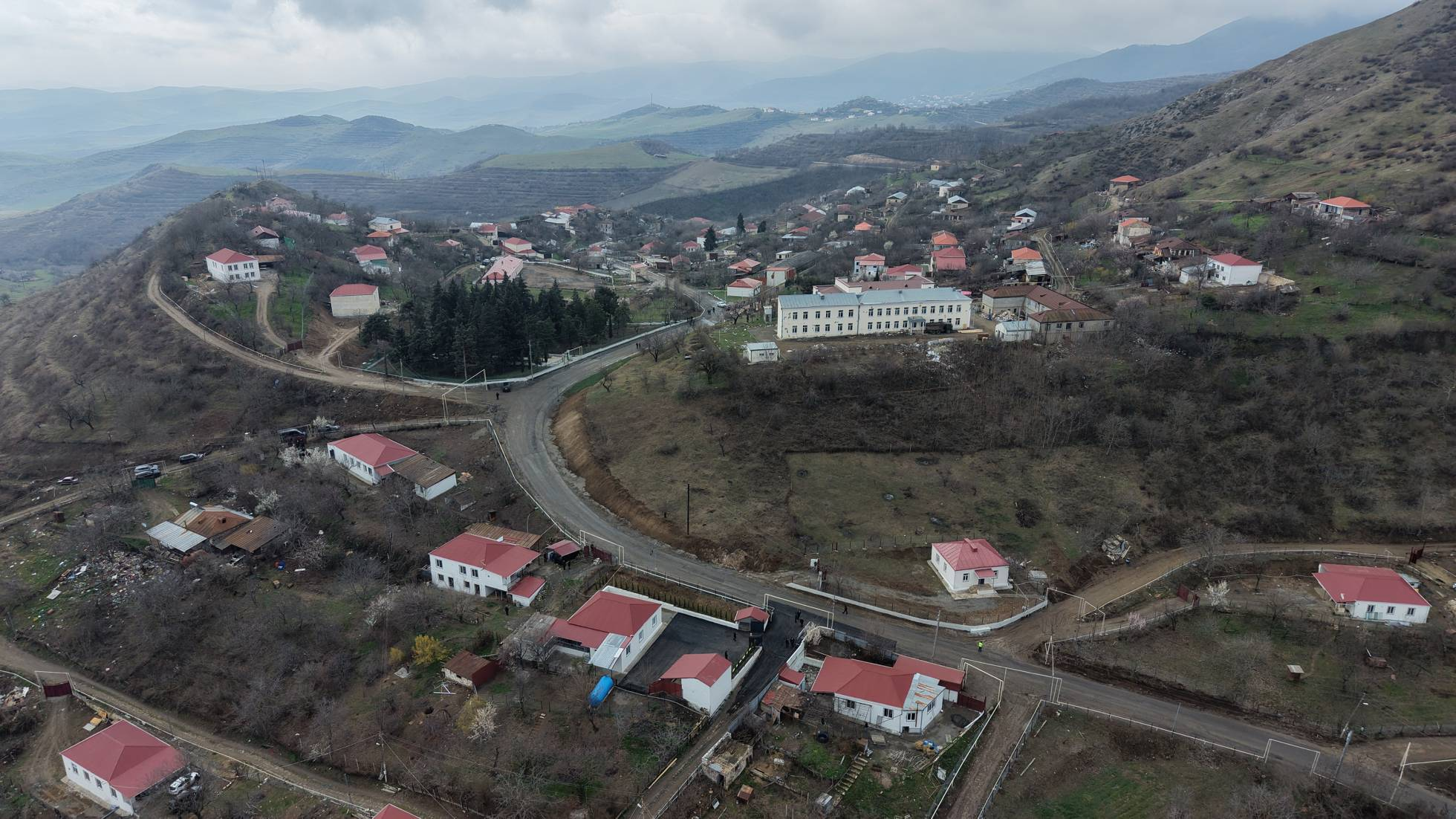
- Village in 2026

- Location within Azerbaijan
- Coordinates: 39°45′51.8″N 47°02′25.8″E
- Country: Azerbaijan
  - District: Khojavend

Population (2015)
  - Total: 615
- Time zone: UTC+4 (AZT)

Khnushinak (Armenian: Խնուշինակ) or Khanoba (Azerbaijani: Xanoba) is a village located in the Khojavend District of Azerbaijan, in the region of Nagorno-Karabakh. Until 2023 it was controlled by the breakaway Republic of Artsakh. The village had an ethnic Armenian-majority population until the expulsion of the Armenian population of Nagorno-Karabakh by Azerbaijan following the 2023 Azerbaijani offensive in Nagorno-Karabakh.

== History ==
During the Soviet period, the village was a part of the Martuni District of the Nagorno-Karabakh Autonomous Oblast.

== Historical heritage sites ==
Historical heritage sites in and around the village include the 19th-century church of Surb Astvatsatsin (Armenian: Սուրբ Աստվածածին, lit. 'Holy Mother of God'), and the 19th/20th-century village of Hin Khnushinak (Armenian: Հին Խնուշինակ, lit. 'Old Khnushinak')

== Economy and culture ==
The population is mainly engaged in agriculture and animal husbandry. As of 2015, the village has a municipal building, a house of culture, a secondary school, two shops, and a medical centre.

== Demographics ==
The village had 664 inhabitants in 2005, and 615 inhabitants in 2015.

== Gallery ==
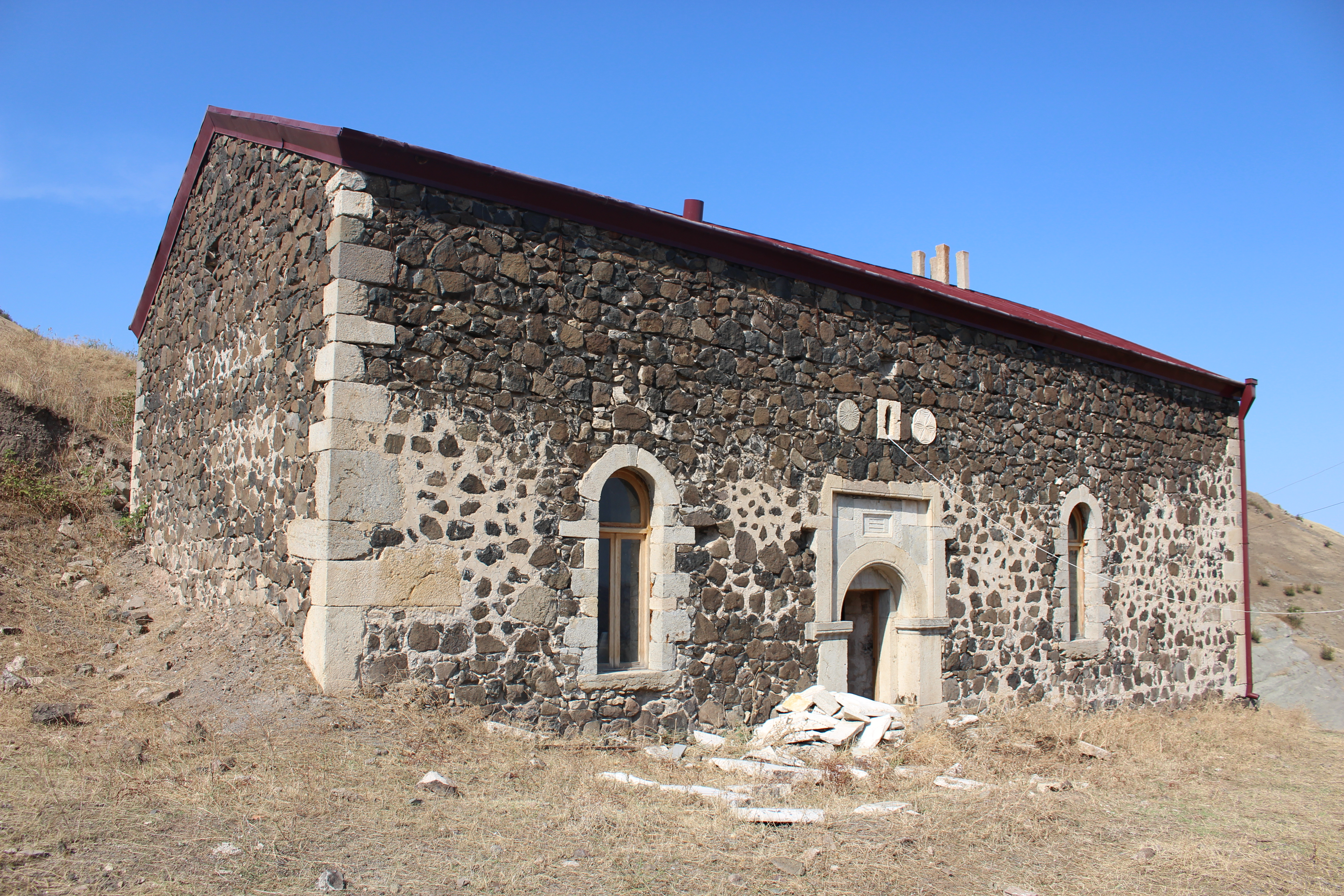
St. Astvatsatsin Church

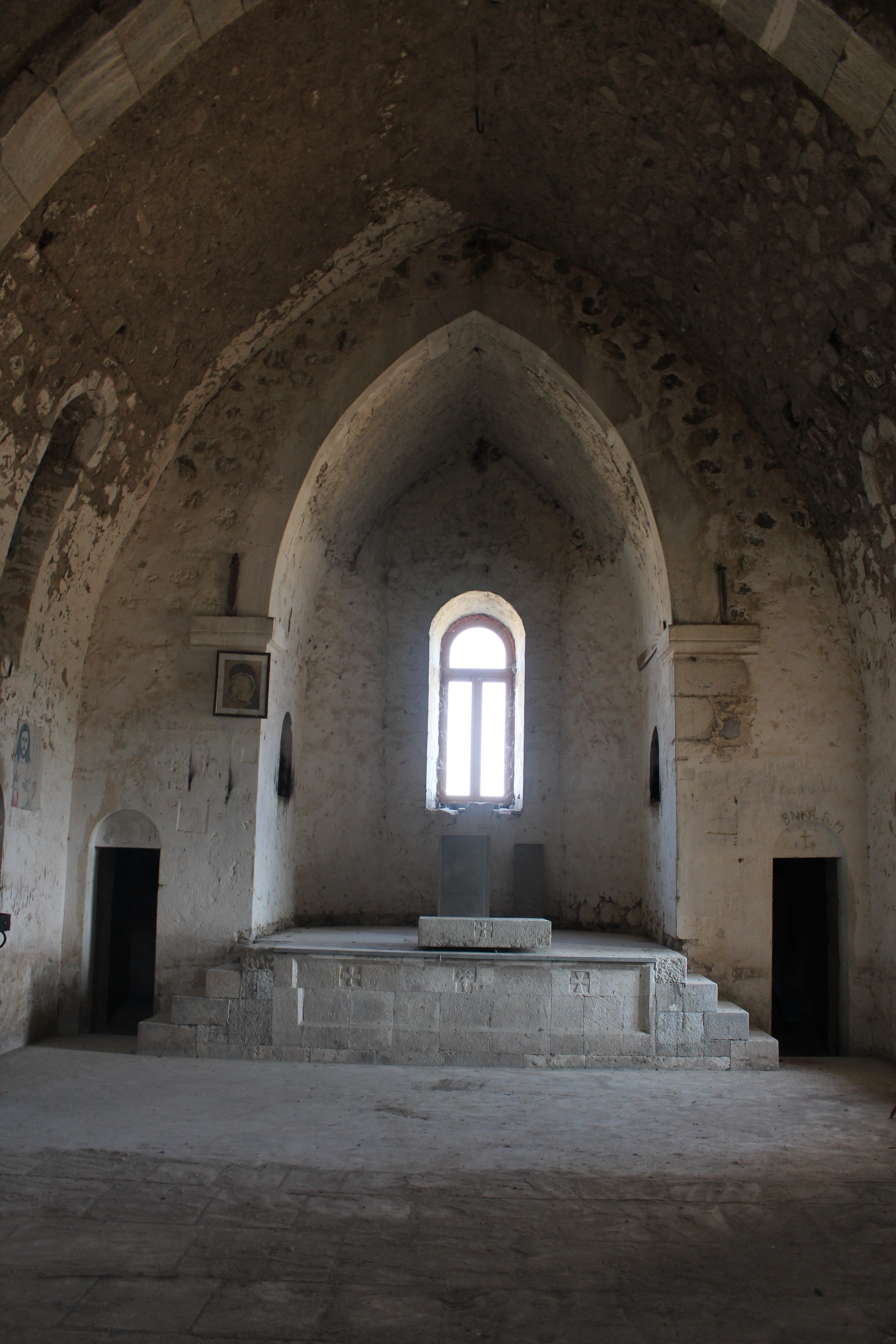
St. Astvatsatsin Church interior

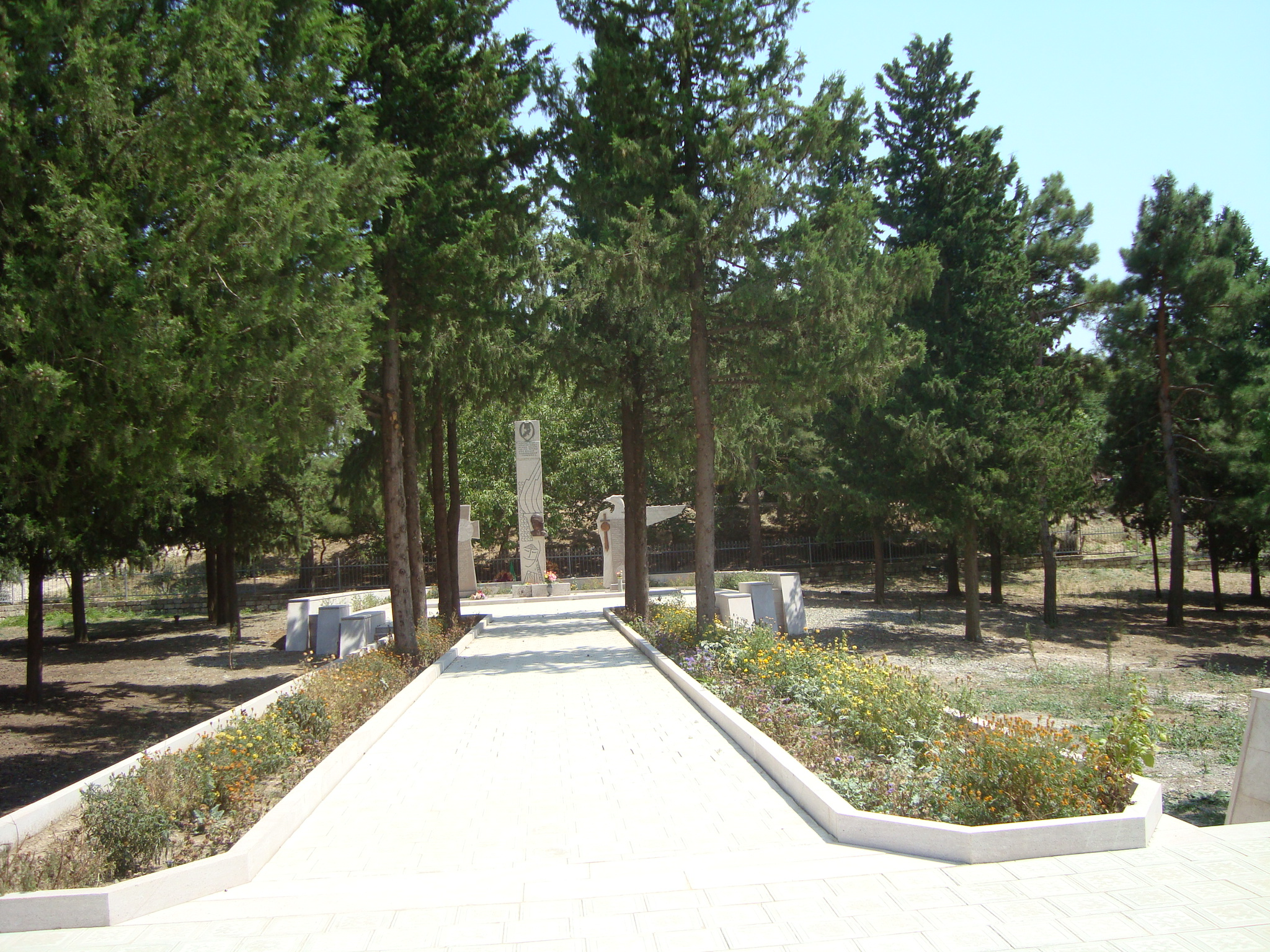
A monument for the fallen in the First Nagorno-Karabakh War

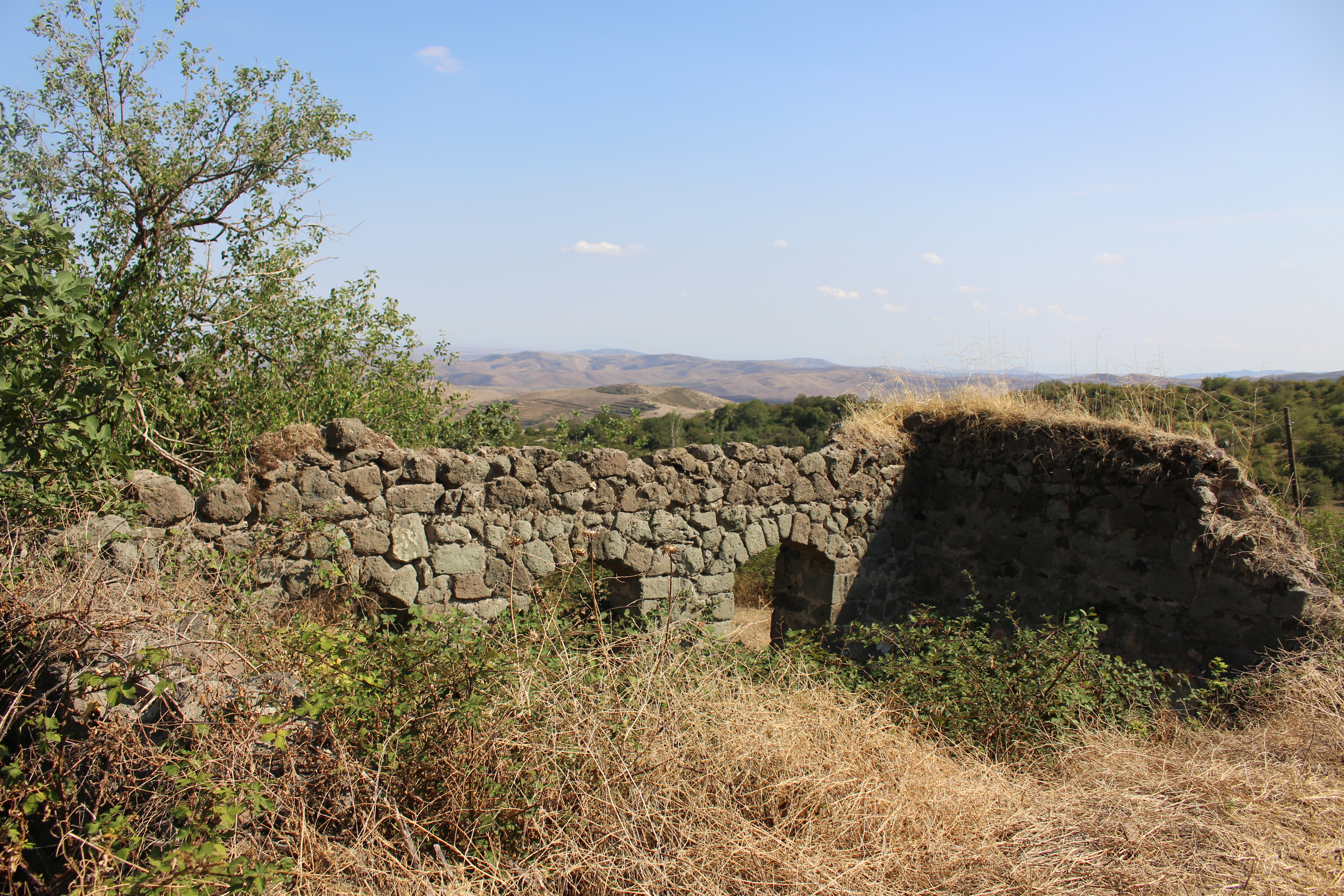
The ruined village of Hin Khnushinak
