= Paravatumb =

Paravatumb Պառավաթումբ
- Qarıtəpə
- Location within Azerbaijan
- Coordinates: 39°48′19″N 46°56′21″E
- Country: Azerbaijan
  - District: Khojavend

Population (2015)
  - Total: 140
- Time zone: UTC+4 (AZT)

Paravatumb (Armenian: Պառավաթումբ) or Garitapa (Azerbaijani: Qarıtəpə) is a village located in the Kalbajar District of Azerbaijan, in the region of Nagorno-Karabakh. Until 2023 it was controlled by the breakaway Republic of Artsakh. The village had an ethnic Armenian-majority population until the expulsion of the Armenian population of Nagorno-Karabakh by Azerbaijan following the 2023 Azerbaijani offensive in Nagorno-Karabakh.

== History ==
During the Soviet period, the village was a part of the Martuni District of the Nagorno-Karabakh Autonomous Oblast.

== Economy and culture ==
The population is mainly engaged in agriculture and animal husbandry. As of 2015, the village has a municipal building, a house of culture, the Paravatumb branch of the Kaghartsi Secondary School, and a medical centre.

== Demographics ==
The village had 171 inhabitants in 2005, and 140 inhabitants in 2015.
