= Hacısamlı =

- Location within Azerbaijan Location within East Zangezur Economic Region
- Coordinates: 39°48′04″N 46°24′28″E
- Country: Azerbaijan
- District: Lachin

Population (2015)
  - Total: 23
- Time zone: UTC+4 (AZT)

Hacısamlı (Hajisamly) is a village in the Lachin District of Azerbaijan.

== History ==
The village was located in the Armenian-occupied territories surrounding Nagorno-Karabakh, coming under the control of ethnic Armenian forces during the First Nagorno-Karabakh War in the early 1990s. The village subsequently became part of the breakaway Republic of Artsakh as part of its Kashatagh Province, where it was known as Vazgenashen (Armenian: Վազգենաշեն). It was returned to Azerbaijan as part of the 2020 Nagorno-Karabakh ceasefire agreement.

== Historical heritage sites ==
Historical heritage sites in and around the village include a 15th/16th-century cemetery with khachkars, thirteen 15th/16th-century khachkars, a 15th/16th-century church, the 15th/16th-century rock-cut khachkar of Vazgenashen (Վազգենաշեն), and the 17th/18th-century bridge of Kotrats (Armenian: Կոտրած).
