= Karahunj, Nagorno-Karabakh =

Karahunj Քարահունջ
- Qarazəmi
- Location within Azerbaijan
- Coordinates: 39°44′03.6″N 46°59′35.8″E
- Country: Azerbaijan
  - District: Khojavend

Population (2015)
  - Total: 168
- Time zone: UTC+4 (AZT)

Karahunj (Armenian: Քարահունջ) or Garazami (Azerbaijani: Qarazəmi) is a village located in the Khojavend District of Azerbaijan, in the region of Nagorno-Karabakh. Until 2023 it was controlled by the breakaway Republic of Artsakh. The village had an ethnic Armenian-majority population until the expulsion of the Armenian population of Nagorno-Karabakh by Azerbaijan following the 2023 Azerbaijani offensive in Nagorno-Karabakh.

== History ==
During the Soviet period, the village was a part of the Martuni District of the Nagorno-Karabakh Autonomous Oblast.

== Economy and culture ==
The population is mainly engaged in agriculture and animal husbandry. As of 2015, the village has a municipal building, a house of culture, a school, and a medical centre.

== Demographics ==
The village has an ethnic Armenian-majority population, had 178 inhabitants in 2005, and 168 inhabitants in 2015.
