= Norshen, Nagorno-Karabakh =

Norshen / Yenikend Նորշեն / Yenikənd
- Location within Azerbaijan
- Coordinates: 39°50′59″N 46°58′41″E
- Country: Azerbaijan
  - District: Khojavend

Population (2015)
  - Total: 354
- Time zone: UTC+4 (AZT)

Norshen (Armenian: Նորշեն) or Yenikend (Azerbaijani: Yenikənd) is a village located in the Khojavend District of Azerbaijan, in the region of Nagorno-Karabakh. Until 2023 it was controlled by the breakaway Republic of Artsakh. The village had an ethnic Armenian-majority population until the expulsion of the Armenian population of Nagorno-Karabakh by Azerbaijan following the 2023 Azerbaijani offensive in Nagorno-Karabakh.

== Etymology ==
The village's name means "new village" in both Armenian and Azerbaijani.

== History ==
During the Soviet period, the village was a part of the Martuni District of the Nagorno-Karabakh Autonomous Oblast.

== Historical heritage sites ==
Historical heritage sites in and around the village include the 19th-century St. John's Church (Armenian: Սուրբ Հովհաննես եկեղեցի, romanized: Surb Hovhannes Yekeghetsi), and a bridge built in 1912.

== Economy and culture ==
The population is mainly engaged in agriculture and animal husbandry. As of 2015, the village has a municipal building, a house of culture, a secondary school, two shops, and a medical centre.

== Demographics ==
The village had 372 inhabitants in 2005, and 354 inhabitants in 2015.
