= Yeni Qaralar =

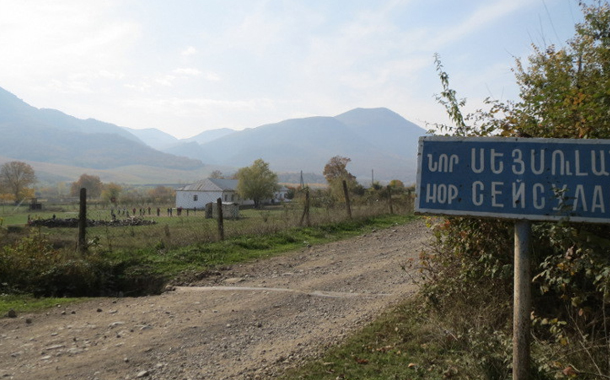

- Location within Azerbaijan
- Coordinates: 40°02′08.0″N 46°45′23.7″E
- Country: Azerbaijan
- District: Aghdara

Population (2015)
  - Total: 179
- Time zone: UTC+4 (AZT)

Yeni Qaralar (Yeni Garalar) is a village in the Aghdara District of Azerbaijan.

== History ==
The village was located in the Armenian-occupied territories surrounding Nagorno-Karabakh, coming under the control of ethnic Armenian forces during the First Nagorno-Karabakh War in the early 1990s. The village subsequently became part of the breakaway Republic of Artsakh as part of its Martakert Province, where it was known as Nor Seysulan (Armenian: Նոր Սեյսուլան). It was returned to Azerbaijan as part of the 2020 Nagorno-Karabakh ceasefire agreement.

== Historical heritage sites ==
Historical heritage sites in and around the village include tombs from the 2nd–1st millennia BCE.

== Demographics ==
The village had 138 inhabitants in 2005, and 179 inhabitants in 2015.
