= Zardanashen =

Zardanashen Զարդանաշեն
- Zərdanaşen
- Location within Azerbaijan Location within Karabakh Economic Region
- Coordinates: 39°40′03″N 46°52′50″E
- Country: Azerbaijan
- District: Khojavend

Population (2015)
  - Total: 101
- Time zone: UTC+4 (AZT)

Zardanashen (Armenian: Զարդանաշեն; Azerbaijani: Zərdanaşen) is a village in the Khojavend District of Azerbaijan, in the region of Nagorno-Karabakh. The village had an ethnic Armenian-majority population prior to the 2020 Nagorno-Karabakh war, and also had an Armenian majority in 1989.

== History ==
During the Soviet period, the village was part of the Martuni District of the Nagorno-Karabakh Autonomous Oblast. After the First Nagorno-Karabakh War, the village was administrated as part of the Martuni Province of the breakaway Republic of Artsakh. The village was captured by Azerbaijan on 9 November 2020, during the 2020 Nagorno-Karabakh war.

== Historical heritage sites ==
Historical heritage sites in and around the village include the 18th/19th-century church of Surb Astvatsatsin (Armenian: Սուրբ Աստվածածին, lit. 'Holy Mother of God').

== Demographics ==
The village had 95 inhabitants in 2005, and 101 inhabitants in 2015.
