= Çağadüz =

Chaghaduz / Sargsashen Çağadüz / Սարգսաշեն
- Location within Azerbaijan Location within Karabakh Economic Region
- Coordinates: 39°41′31″N 46°53′42″E
- Country: Azerbaijan
- District: Khojavend

Population (2015)
  - Total: 285
- Time zone: UTC+4 (AZT)

Chaghaduz (Azerbaijani: Çağadüz) or Sargsashen (Armenian: Սարգսաշեն) is a village in the Khojavend District of Azerbaijan, in the region of Nagorno-Karabakh.

== History ==
During the Soviet period, the village was part of the Martuni District of the Nagorno-Karabakh Autonomous Oblast. After the First Nagorno-Karabakh War, the village was administrated as part of the Martuni Province of the breakaway Republic of Artsakh. The village was captured by Azerbaijan during the 2020 Nagorno-Karabakh war.

== Historical heritage sites ==
Historical heritage sites in and around the village include a shrine from between the 2nd millennium BCE and the 17th century BCE, the fortress-settlement of Jaghaduz (Armenian: Ջաղադուզ) from the 3rd century BCE, khachkars from between the 11th and 12th centuries, and 19th-century watermills.

== Demographics ==
The village had an ethnic Armenian-majority population in 1989. Prior to the 2020 Nagorno-Karabakh war, it also had an Armenian majority with 264 inhabitants in 2005, and 285 inhabitants in 2015.
