= Yemishchan =

Yemishchan Եմիշճան Yemişcan
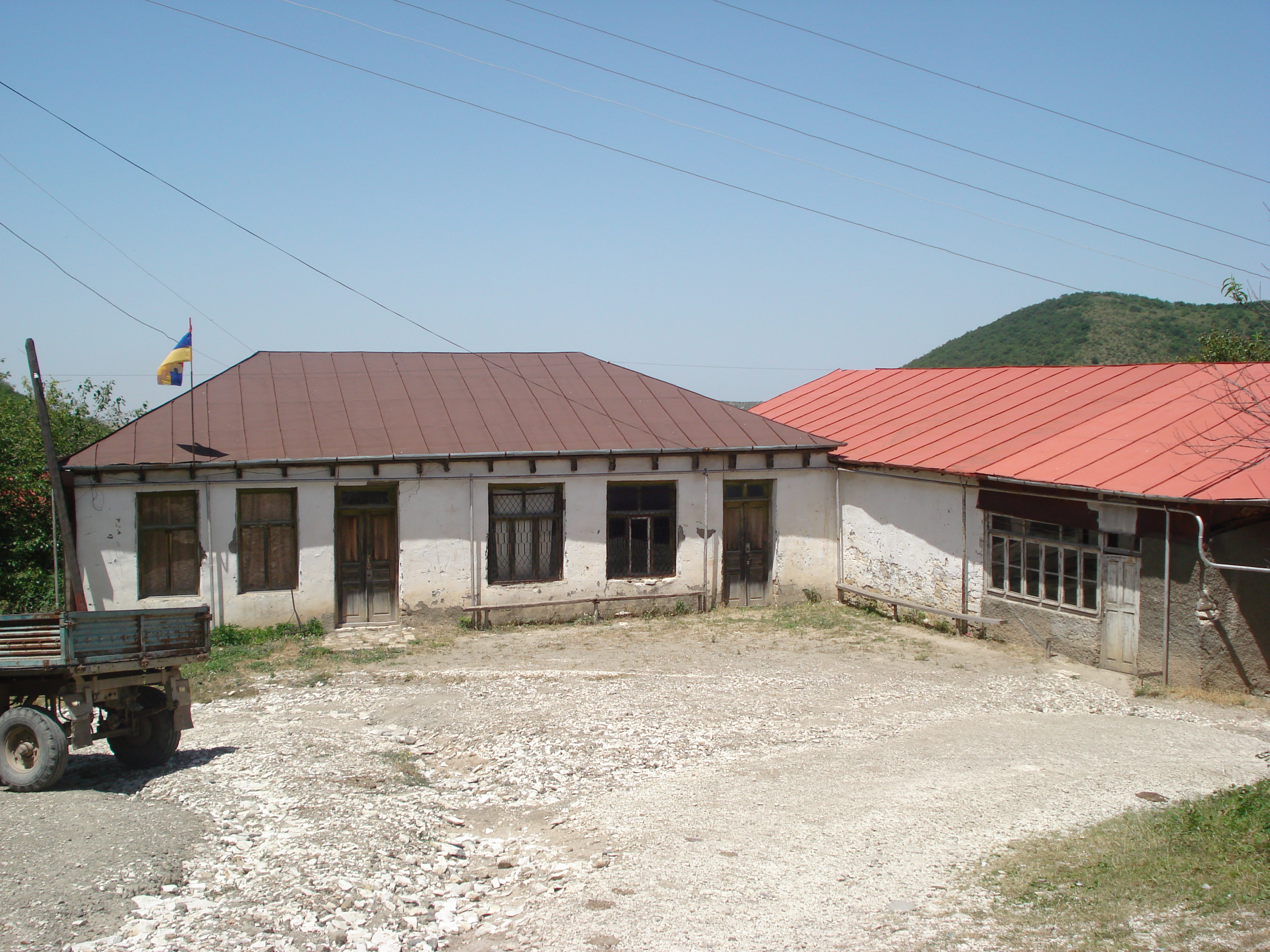

- Location within Azerbaijan Location within Karabakh Economic Region
- Coordinates: 39°49′51″N 47°00′39″E
- Country: Azerbaijan
  - District: Khojavend
- Elevation: 794 m (2,605 ft)

Population (2015)
  - Total: 178
- Time zone: UTC+4 (AZT)

Yemishchan (Armenian: Եմիշճան; Azerbaijani: Yemişcan, also Yemishjan) is a village in the Khojavend District of Azerbaijan, in the disputed region of Nagorno-Karabakh. Until 2023 it was controlled by the breakaway Republic of Artsakh. The village had an ethnic Armenian-majority population until the expulsion of the Armenian population of Nagorno-Karabakh by Azerbaijan following the 2023 Azerbaijani offensive in Nagorno-Karabakh.

== History ==
During the Soviet period, the village was a part of the Martuni District of the Nagorno-Karabakh Autonomous Oblast.

== Historical heritage sites ==
Historical heritage sites in and around the village include the 19th-century St. Stephen's Church (Armenian: Սուրբ Ստեփանոս եկեղեցի, romanized: Surb Stepanos Yekeghetsi).

== Economy and culture ==
The population is mainly engaged in agriculture and animal husbandry. As of 2015, the village has a municipal building, a house of culture, a school, and a medical centre.

== Demographics ==
The village has an ethnic Armenian-majority population, had 194 inhabitants in 2005, and 178 inhabitants in 2015.
