= Sarısu, Goygol =

Sarısu
- Municipality
- Location within Azerbaijan
- Coordinates: 40°26′48″N 46°24′33″E
- Country: Azerbaijan
- District: Goranboy

Population
  - Total: 447
- Time zone: UTC+4 (AZT)

Sarısu (Sarysu) is a village and municipality in the Goygol District of Azerbaijan.
