= Dahrav =

Dahrav / Gayabashy Դահրավ / Qayabaşı
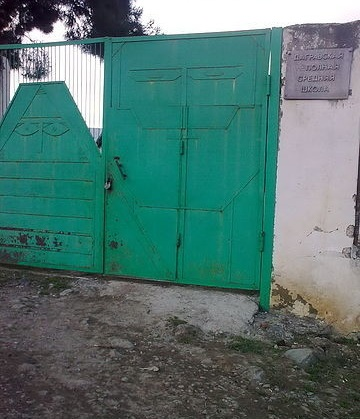
- The gate of the Dahrav school

- Location within Azerbaijan
- Coordinates: 39°53′37″N 46°41′58″E
- Country: Azerbaijan
  - District: Khojaly
- Elevation: 863 m (2,831 ft)

Population (2015)
  - Total: 179
- Time zone: UTC+4 (AZT)

Dahrav (Armenian: Դահրավ) or Gayabashy (Azerbaijani: Qayabaşı) is a village in the Khojaly District of Azerbaijan, in the region of Nagorno-Karabakh. Until 2023 it was controlled by the breakaway Republic of Artsakh. The village had an ethnic Armenian-majority population until the expulsion of the Armenian population of Nagorno-Karabakh by Azerbaijan following the 2023 Azerbaijani offensive in Nagorno-Karabakh.

== History ==
During the Soviet period, the village was a part of the Askeran District of the Nagorno-Karabakh Autonomous Oblast.

== Historical heritage sites ==
Historical heritage sites in and around the village include mural khachkars from 1081 and 1276, the 12th/13th-century church of Sren Nahatak (Armenian: Սռեն նահատակ), a 12th/13th-century chapel, a cemetery from between the 16th and 19th centuries, the 17th/18th-century shrine of Yeghtsahogh (Armenian: Եղցահող), an 18th/19th-century shrine, a 19th-century spring monument, the spring monument of Raffi (Armenian: Րաֆֆի) from 1800, and the 19th-century St. John's Church (Armenian: Սուրբ Հովհաննես եկեղեցի, romanized: Surb Hovhannes Yekeghetsi).

== Economy and culture ==
The population is mainly engaged in agriculture and animal husbandry. As of 2015, the village has a municipal building, a house of culture, a school, and a medical centre.

== Demographics ==
The village had 216 inhabitants in 2005, and 179 inhabitants in 2015.
