= Aghabekalanj, Nagorno-Karabakh =

Village in Aghdara District, Azerbaijan

Aghabekalanj / Aghabayyaly Աղաբեկալանջ / Ağabəyyalı
- Location within Azerbaijan
- Coordinates: 40°12′45″N 46°47′20″E
- Country: Azerbaijan
- Region: Nagorno-Karabakh
- District: Aghdara

Population (2015)
  - Total: 168
- Time zone: UTC+4 (AZT)

Aghabekalanj (Armenian: Աղաբեկալանջ) or Aghabayyaly (Azerbaijani: Ağabəyyalı) is a village located in the Aghdara District of Azerbaijan, in the region of Nagorno-Karabakh. Until 2023 it was controlled by the breakaway Republic of Artsakh. The village had an ethnic Armenian-majority population until the expulsion of the Armenian population of Nagorno-Karabakh by Azerbaijan following the 2023 Azerbaijani offensive in Nagorno-Karabakh.

== History ==
During the Soviet period, the village was part of the Mardakert District of the Nagorno-Karabakh Autonomous Oblast.

== Economy and culture ==
The population is mainly engaged in agriculture and animal husbandry. As of 2015, the village has a municipal building, a school, and a medical centre.

== Demographics ==
The village had 155 inhabitants in 2005, and 168 inhabitants in 2015.
