= Hacıxanlı =

- Location within Azerbaijan Location within East Zangezur Economic Region
- Coordinates: 39°51′26″N 46°16′18″E
- Country: Azerbaijan
- District: Lachin
- Time zone: UTC+4 (AZT)

Hacıxanlı (Hajikhanly; formerly known as Zorkeşiş) is a village in the Lachin District of Azerbaijan.
