= Khnkavan =

Khnkavan / Khangutala Խնկավան / Xanqutala
- Location within Azerbaijan Location within East Zangezur Economic Region
- Coordinates: 40°06′48″N 46°27′44″E
- Country: Azerbaijan
  - District: Kalbajar

Population (2015)
  - Total: 193
- Time zone: UTC+4 (AZT)

Khnkavan (Armenian: Խնկավան) or Khangutala (Azerbaijani: Xanqutala) is a village that is located in the Kalbajar District of Azerbaijan, in the region of Nagorno-Karabakh. Until 2023 it was controlled by the breakaway Republic of Artsakh. The village had an ethnic Armenian-majority population until the expulsion of the Armenian population of Nagorno-Karabakh by Azerbaijan following the 2023 Azerbaijani offensive in Nagorno-Karabakh.

== History ==
During the Soviet period, the village was part of the Mardakert District of the Nagorno-Karabakh Autonomous Oblast.

== Economy and culture ==
The population is mainly engaged in agriculture and animal husbandry. As of 2015, the village has a municipal building, the Khnkavan branch of the Vaghuhas Secondary School, and a medical centre.

== Demographics ==
The village had 169 inhabitants in 2005, and 193 inhabitants in 2015.
