= Hovsepavan =

Hovsepavan Հովսեփավան
- Location within Azerbaijan
- Coordinates: 39°55′01.5″N 46°45′42.4″E
- Country: Azerbaijan
  - District: Khojaly

Population (2015)
  - Total: 176
- Time zone: UTC+4 (AZT)

Hovsepavan (Armenian: Հովսեփավան) is a village located in the Khojaly District of Azerbaijan, in the region of Nagorno-Karabakh. Until 2023 it was controlled by the breakaway Republic of Artsakh. The village had an ethnic Armenian-majority population until the expulsion of the Armenian population of Nagorno-Karabakh by Azerbaijan following the 2023 Azerbaijani offensive in Nagorno-Karabakh.

== History ==
Hovsepavan was founded during the period of the Karabakh movement in Nagorno-Karabakh. During the Soviet period, the area around the village was a part of the Askeran District of the Nagorno-Karabakh Autonomous Oblast.

After the 2020 Nagorno-Karabakh war, Artsakh launched the construction of a new residential area for 92 displaced families in the village.

== Geography ==
Hovsepavan is situated on the flatlands, 9 km to the west of Askeran, the regional centre, and 15 km to the north of Stepanakert, the capital of Artsakh.

== Economy and culture ==
The population of the village is mostly engaged in agriculture and animal husbandry, with the majority of the village lands being agricultural. As of 2015, the village has a municipal building, a house of culture, a school, and a medical centre.

== Demographics ==
The village has an ethnic Armenian-majority population, had 128 inhabitants in 2005, and 176 inhabitants in 2015.
