= Martuni District (NKAO) =

Coordinates: 39°47′43″N 47°06′47″E

- District
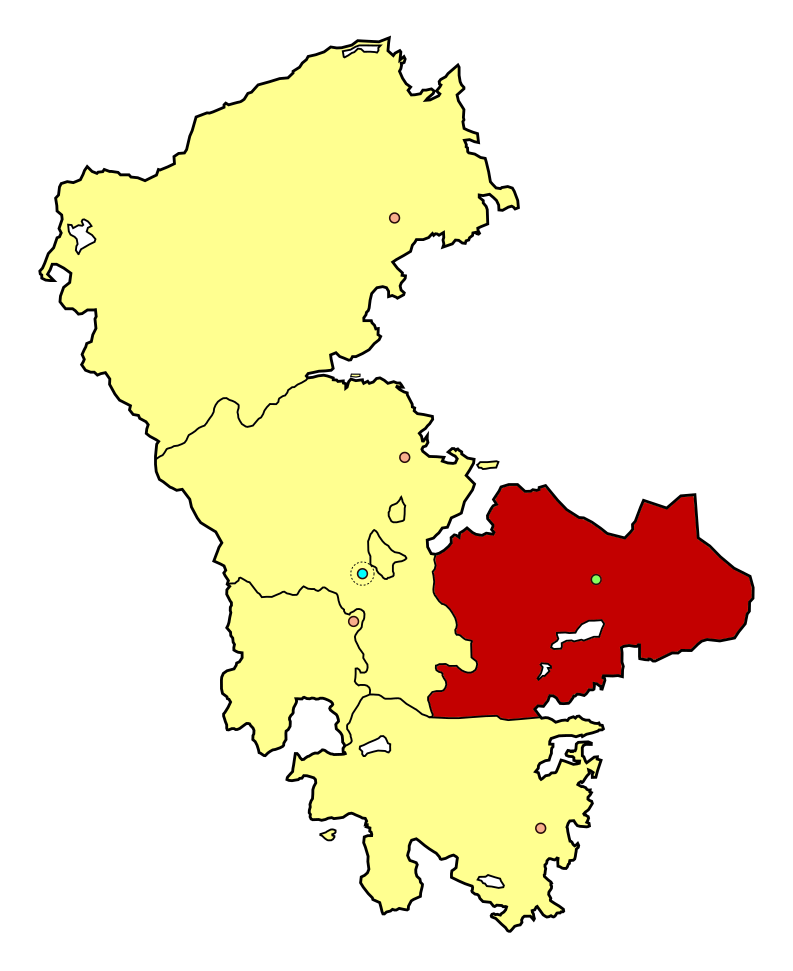
- Map of Martuni within NKAO
- Autonomous region: (Azerbaijan Soviet Socialist Republic) Nagorno-Karabakh Autonomous Oblast
- Country: Azerbaijan SSR
- Abolished: 13 October 1992
- Capital: Martuni

Population (1979)
  - Total: 27,742

Martuni District (Azerbaijani: Martuni rayonu, Мартуни рајону; Armenian: Մարտունու շրջան) was an administrative unit within the former Nagorno-Karabakh Autonomous Oblast (NKAO) of the Azerbaijan Soviet Socialist Republic.

== History ==
The administrative centre of the district was the town of Martuni.

The Nagorno-Karabakh Autonomous Oblast was abolished on 26 November 1991. On 13 October 1992, the Martuni district was merged with the Hadrut district to form the Khojavend District.

Following the First Nagorno-Karabakh war, most of the former district came under the control of the self-proclaimed Republic of Artsakh and was incorporated into its Martuni Province, while Azerbaijan retained control of a small eastern part of the district. During the 2020 Nagorno-Karabakh war, Azerbaijan recaptured the southern part of the former district.

== Demographics ==
Year	Population	Ethnic groups	Source
1939	32,298	93.6% Armenians, 4.6% Azerbaijanis, 1.4% Russians	Soviet Census
1959	24,841	87.3% Armenians, 11.9% Azerbaijanis, 0.5% Russians	Soviet Census
1970	26,178	85.5% Armenians, 14.0% Azerbaijanis, 0.2% Russians	Soviet Census
1979	27,742	79.3% Armenians, 19.8% Azerbaijanis, 0.6% Russians	Soviet Census
