= Armenian-occupied territories surrounding Nagorno-Karabakh =

Formerly occupied territories of Azerbaijan

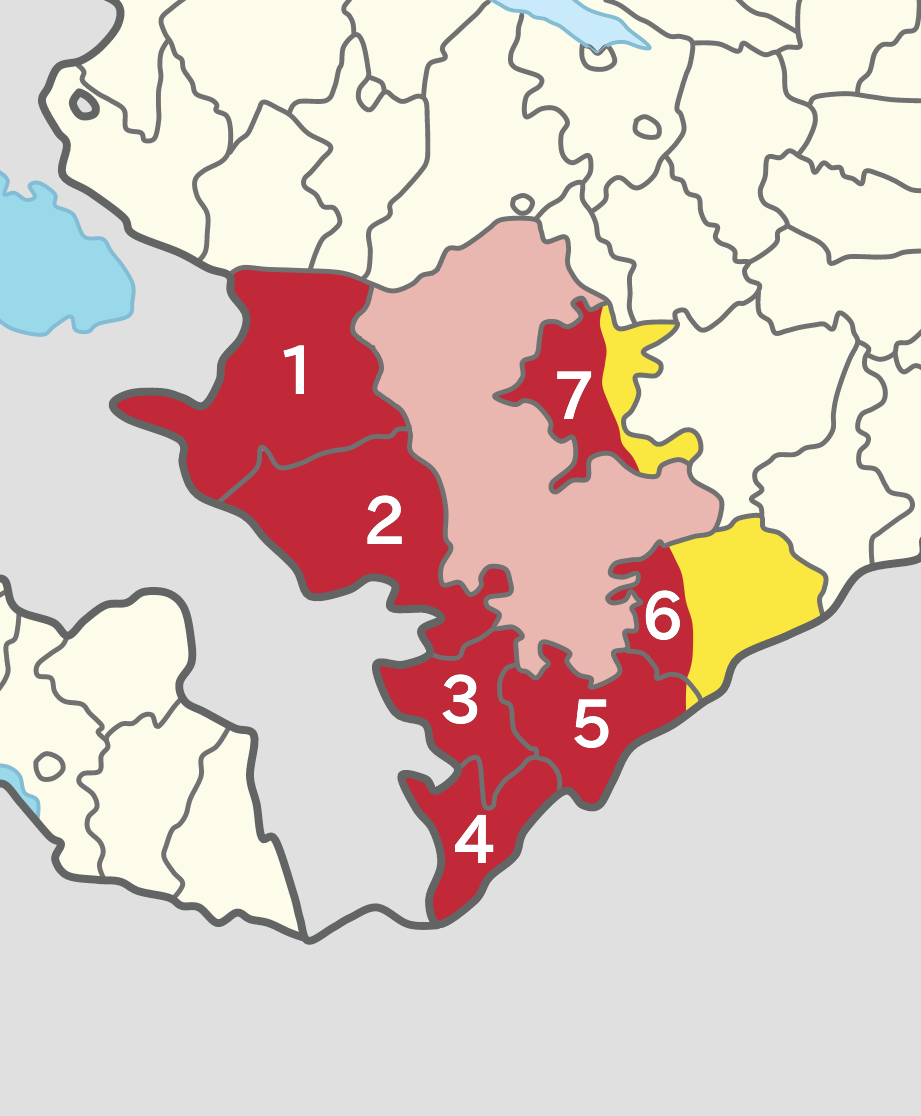
Map of the occupied districts prior to the Second Nagorno-Karabakh War in 2020, where the former NKAO is depicted in pink and pre-2020 Azerbaijani-held territory in yellow.: 1. Kalbajar; 2. Lachin; 3. Qubadli; 4. Zangilan / 5. Jabrayil; 6. Fuzuli; 7. Agdam

The Armenian-occupied territories surrounding Nagorno-Karabakh were areas of Azerbaijan, situated around the former Nagorno-Karabakh Autonomous Oblast (NKAO), which were occupied by the ethnic Armenian military forces of the breakaway Republic of Artsakh (or the Nagorno-Karabakh Republic) with military support from Armenia, from the end of the First Nagorno-Karabakh War (1988–1994) to the Second Nagorno-Karabakh War in 2020 (with the exception of the Lachin corridor). The surrounding regions were seized by Armenians under the justification of a "security belt" which was to be traded for recognition of autonomous status from Azerbaijan.

The United Nations Security Council adopted four resolutions during the First Nagorno-Karabakh War demanding that all occupying forces withdraw from the territories surrounding Nagorno-Karabakh. In 2008, the United Nations General Assembly passed Resolution 62/243, demanding the withdrawal of all Armenian forces from all the occupied territories of Azerbaijan, although the co-chairs of the OSCE Minsk Group, Russia, France and the United States, voted against it. Unlike the Nagorno-Karabakh Autonomous Oblast, the population of all the adjacent Armenian-occupied districts were majority-Azerbaijani.

In the wake of the Second Nagorno-Karabakh War (2020), Azerbaijan gained control over Fuzuli, Jabrayil, Zangilan, and Qubadli districts, and Armenia agreed to withdraw its forces from Agdam, Kalbajar, and Lachin districts, returning them to Azerbaijani control, by 20 November, 25 November and 1 December 2020, respectively. This agreement was codified in a Russian-brokered ceasefire agreement, to be enforced by Russian peacekeepers.

== History ==
At the outset of the 1991–1994 Karabakh conflict, the majority-Armenian Nagorno-Karabakh Autonomous Oblast was surrounded by regions with Azerbaijani majorities and had no land border with Armenia.

- 18 May 1992, Armenian forces occupied Lachin, opening the Lachin corridor for land communications between NKR and Armenia. A strong offensive by Armenian forces occurred in 1993, resulting in the securing of further territory to act as a "security zone".
- 27 March 1993, Armenian forces launched an offensive in Kalbajar and by 5 April had completely occupied the area of Kalbajar District, creating a strong link between Nagorno Karabakh and Armenia and removing from the Lachin corridor the threat of attack from the north.
- 23 July 1993, after 40 days of fighting, officially known in Armenia as the "suppression of enemy firing points", Agdam was occupied. Then followed an attack in the south:
- 22 August 1993 – Fuzuli was occupied.
- 25 August 1993 – Jabrayil was occupied.
- 31 August 1993 – Qubadli was occupied.
- 29 October 1993 – Zangilan was occupied.

From then till the 2020 war, Armenians were in control of most of the territory of the former Nagorno-Karabakh Autonomous Oblast, with Azerbaijan controlling parts of the eastern Martuni and eastern Mardakert. In addition, since that time and until 2020, Armenians occupied all of the territory between the former NKAO and Iran, as well as all of the territory between the former NKAO and Armenia, and some areas to the east surrounding Aghdam. Nagorno-Karabakh also claims but did not control the region known until 1992 as Shahumian, which although being majority-Armenian before 1992, was not part of the NKAO. Shahumian's Armenian population was driven out during the war, and the Armenian and Azeri forces were separated on the northern front by the Murovdag mountain chain until 2020.

Since 1994, Armenia and Azerbaijan have held talks on the future of the occupied territories. The Armenian side offered to use a "land for status" formula (returning the occupied territories to the control of Azerbaijan in exchange for Azerbaijan recognizing the independence of Nagorno-Karabakh and giving security assurances to Nagorno-Karabakh and the Lachin corridor), while Azerbaijan offered a formula of "land for peace" (returning the occupied territories back to Azerbaijan in exchange for security guarantees with Azerbaijan controlling the territory of Nagorno-Karabakh). Mediators offered another "land for status" option (returning the occupied territories to the control of Azerbaijan in exchange for guarantees by Azerbaijan to hold at some point a referendum on the status of Nagorno-Karabakh).

=== Territory and population ===
==== Before 2020 war ====
The predominantly Azerbaijani population of the occupied territories was forced out as a result of what HRW considers violations of the rules of war, and became IDPs in Azerbaijan. According to UNHCR office in Baku, based on Azerbaijani government statistics, in March 1994 there were an estimated 658,000 displaced persons and 235,000 refugees in Azerbaijan.

An OSCE Fact-Finding Mission visited the occupied territories in 2005 to inspect settlement activity in the area and report its findings to the Co-Chairs of the OSCE Minsk Group. According to FFM figures, at that time the number of Armenian settlers in Kelbajar District was approximately 1,500, in Agdam District from 800 to 1,000, in Fizuli District under 10; in Jebrail District under 100, in Zangelan District from 700 to 1,000, in Kubatly District from 1000 to 1,500, and in Lachin District about 8,000. The OSCE Minsk Group Co-Chairs, who conducted a Field Assessment Mission to the occupied territories of Azerbaijan in October 2010 reported that there was no significant growth in the population since 2005, and the overall population was roughly estimated as 14,000 persons. They also reported that towns and villages that existed before the conflict were abandoned and almost entirely in ruins, and Armenian settlers lived "in precarious conditions, with poor infrastructure, little economic activity, and limited access to public services". In later years, Armenians from Lebanon and Syria settled in the occupied territories.

Based on the administrative and territorial division of Azerbaijan, Armenian forces occupied the territory of the following districts of Azerbaijan from 1994 to 2020:

Districts of Azerbaijan occupied by ethnic Karabakh Armenian forces in whole or in part before 2020 war
#	Raion	Total Area (km^{2})	Total Area (sq mi)	Area under Armenian occupation (km^{2})	Area under Armenian occupation (sq mi)	% Total Area under Armenian occupation	Total Population in 1989
1	Kalbajar	1,936 km^{2}	747 sq mi	1,935 km^{2}	747 sq mi	100%	43,713
2	Lachin	1,835 km^{2}	708 sq mi	1,835 km^{2}	708 sq mi	100%	47,339
3	Qubadli	802 km^{2}	310 sq mi	802 km^{2}	310 sq mi	100%	28,110
4	Zangilan	707 km^{2}	273 sq mi	707 km^{2}	273 sq mi	100%	32,698
5	Jabrayil (Note: Excluding village Jojug Marjanly)	1,050 km^{2}	410 sq mi	1,050 km^{2}	410 sq mi	100%	49,156
Total of 1989's population of territories under full Armenian occupation							201,016
6	Fuzuli	1,386 km^{2}	535 sq mi	462 km^{2}	178 sq mi	33%	89,417
7	Agdam	1,094 km^{2}	422 sq mi	842 km^{2}	325 sq mi	77%	131,293
	Total	8,810 km^{2}	3,400 sq mi	7,633 km^{2}	2,947 sq mi	87%	421,726

The outer perimeter of these territories was a line of direct contact between the military forces of the Republic of Artsakh and Azerbaijan.

Ethnic groups as of the 1979 Soviet census on territory occupied by Armenians from 1993 to 2020
	Azerbaijanis	Armenians	Lezgins	Russians	Kurds	Total
Kalbajar	99.5% (40,329)	0.1% (49)	0.1%(30)	0.1% (46)	0.1% (4)	40,516
Lachin	94.5% (44,665)	0.1% (34)	0.1% (23)	0.1% (28)	5.2% (2,437)	47,261
Qubadli	95.5% (26,537)	0.1% (26)	0.1% (21)	1.4% (312)	0	26,673
Jabrayil	98.5% (42,415)	0.1% (41)	0.1% (33)	1% (434)	0	43,047
Zangilan	97.6% (28,685)	0.1% (35)	0.1% (19)	2.0% (590)	0	29,377
Full occupation's total	97.7% (182,631)	0.1% (185)	0.1% (126)	0.7% (1,410)	1.3% (2,441)	186,874
Fuzuli	96.6% (73,464)	1.1% (833)	0.1% (39)	2.0% (1,544)	0	76,013
Agdam	99% (107,493)	0.4% (387)	0.1% (95)	0.4% (398)	0	108,554
Partitial occupation's total	98% (180,957)	0.7% (1,220)	0.1% (134)	1.1% (1,942)	0	184,567
Total	97.9% (363,588)	0.4% (1,405)	0.1% (260)	0.9% (3,352)	0.7% (2,441)	371,441

==== 2020 war ====
On 27 September 2020, a war broke out in Nagorno-Karabakh, following skirmishes that occurred on the border between Armenia and Azerbaijan in July 2020. Thousands of Azerbaijanis demonstrated for war against Armenia in response, with Turkey propagandising in support of Azerbaijan. The Azerbaijani forces started operations along the Aras River on the same day, with advancements in Jabrayil and Fuzuli districts, and the initial objective to seize control of Jabrayil and Fuzuli. The Azerbaijani authorities claimed to have taken a mountain peak in the Murovdag range in Kalbajar District. They then stated that the Azerbaijani forces had taken effective control of the Vardenis–Martakert/Aghdara highway connecting Nagorno-Karabakh and Armenia. On 23 October, the clashes spilled to Qubadli, with the suspected goal of taking control of the Lachin corridor. Two days later, the Azerbaijani forces had seized control of Qubadli, the administrative center of Qubadli District; Azerbaijan released confirmary footage. The Azerbaijani forces soon entered Lachin District, with its administrative center, Lachin, getting constantly shelled until the end of the conflict.

Three ceasefires brokered by Russia, France, and the United States failed to stop the fighting. Following the capture of Shusha, the second-largest settlement in Nagorno-Karabakh, a ceasefire agreement was signed between the President of Azerbaijan, Ilham Aliyev, the Prime Minister of Armenia, Nikol Pashinyan, and the President of Russia, Vladimir Putin, ending all hostilities in the area from 00:00, 10 November 2020 Moscow Time. The President of Artsakh, Arayik Harutyunyan, also agreed to end the hostilities. Under the agreement, which is being enforced by Russian peacekeepers under an initial 5 year mandate, the former combatants will keep control of their currently held areas within Nagorno-Karabakh, while Armenia will return the surrounding territories it occupied in 1994 to Azerbaijan. Armenia will also allow transport connections between western regions of Azerbaijan’s and Nakhichevan Autonomous Republic, as part of the tripartite plan of unblocking all transport and economic connections in the region.

==== Return to Azerbaijan ====
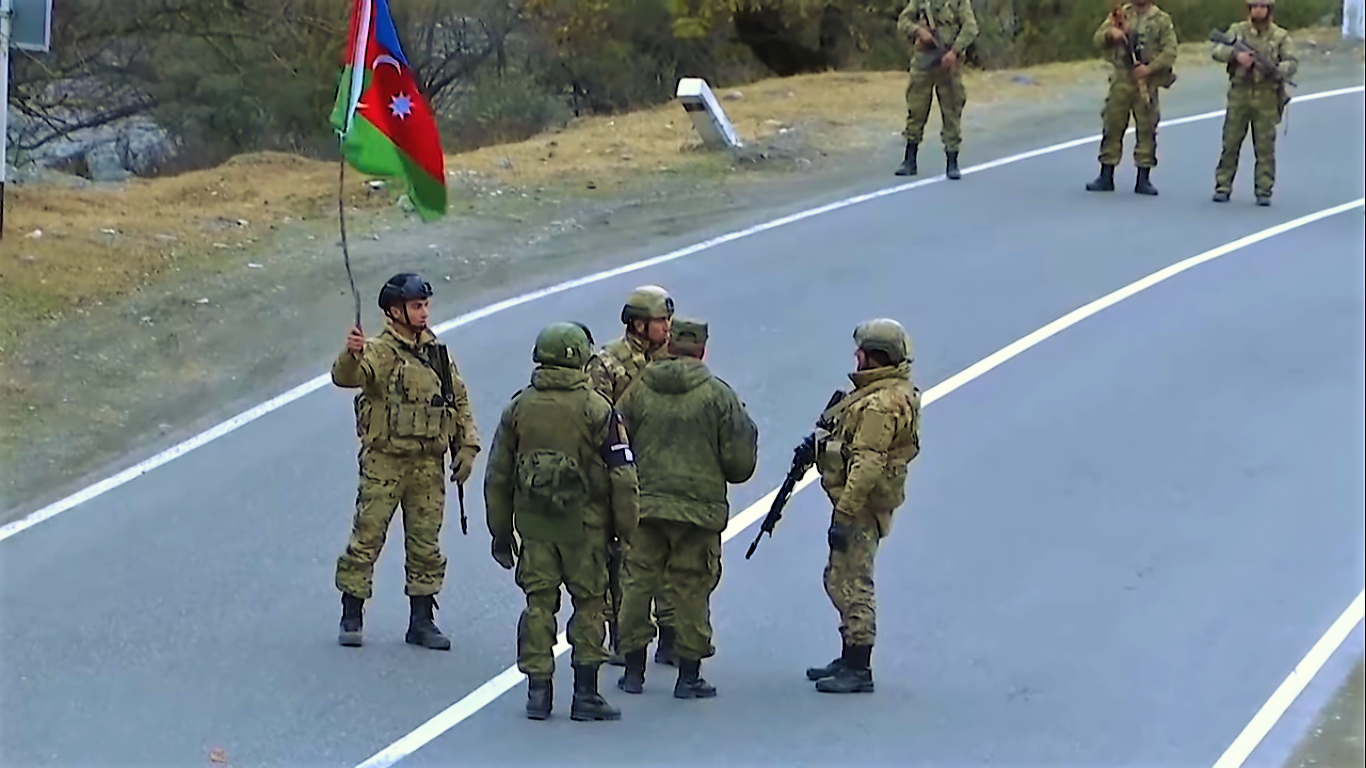
Russian peacekeepers and Azerbaijani military personnel in Kalbajar.

Ahead of the transfer of Kalbajar District from Artsakh to Azerbaijan under the terms of the ceasefire agreement, ethnic Armenians burnt their homes, many of which were once inhabited by Azerbaijanis, to prevent them being reinhabited by the Azerbaijanis. The district had been mostly inhabited by ethnic Azerbaijanis before the First Nagorno-Karabakh War and was re-settled by Armenian citizens after the conflict. Some Armenians took their dead relatives' remains with them, and Reuters reported that villagers were "carting off everything they could as trucks nearby loaded up with household possessions". Reports of house burning emerged on 13 November, and on 15 November Agence France-Presse reported that in Charektar at least six houses were set on fire. BBC Russian Service reported that houses were also burning in neighboring Dadivank, and in other villages along the way. The fleeing Armenians were also sawing trees en masse, taking the firewood back to Armenia. Azerbaijan denounced civilians leaving the area for burning houses and committing what it termed "ecological terror"; President Ilham Aliyev called Armenians who destroyed their properties a "wild enemy". At Armenia's request, Azerbaijan extended the deadline for Armenians to fully vacate Kalbajar District by 10 days, until 25 November. Azerbaijan's Presidential Office stated that it took the worsening weather and the fact that there was only one road to Armenia into consideration when agreeing to extend the deadline.

The first district to be handed over to Azerbaijan was Agdam District, on 20 November. Prior to the transfer of control, Armenians living in Agdam District also set their homes on fire, and on 19 November, Agence France-Presse reported that Armenian soldiers had destroyed their headquarters in Aghdam. Agdam was a predominantly Azerbaijani town until the 1993 battle over the city, after which it became a ghost town, labelled the Hiroshima of Caucasus, The Associated Press reported that Aghdam Mosque, which had been vandalized with graffiti and used as a stable for cattle and swine, was the town's only structurally whole building. Also, on 30 November, French-Iranian Azerbaijani photojournalist Reza Deghati reported that the Armenian forces, before handing over the region, had sacked and burned down an 18th-century mosque, which they used as a barn for cows, in Qiyasli, Agdam. Rustam Muradov, commander of the Russian peacekeeping task force in the region, stated that the handover operation had been carried out without incident. The transfer was celebrated in Baku, where cars paraded through the city with Azerbaijani, Russian and Turkish flags. On 24 November, with the permission of the Azerbaijani military, some Armenians returned to Gülablı to collect their clothing and were offered residency in Agdam as Azerbaijani citizens. On 22 November, the Azerbaijani military reported that it had defused more than 150 mines in the district.

On 25 November, Kalbajar became the second district to be returned to Azerbaijan. Armenian forces blew up their military headquarters before returning the district. The President of Azerbaijan, Ilham Aliyev, vowed to rebuild and revive Kalbajar District, and the event was also celebrated by a rally in Baku. Internally displaced Azerbaijanis from Kalbajar who had settled in Ganja also celebrated the occasion. The Azerbaijani Ministry of Ecology and Natural Resources stated that it would evaluate the mineral deposits of Kalbajar District in order to calculate "the amount of damage caused to Azerbaijan".

On 26 November, Armenian media reported that a group of 250 Azerbaijani soldiers had arrived at the Sotk gold mine, one of the largest gold deposits in the South Caucasus, located on the border of Kalbajar District and Gegharkunik Province in Armenia, and demanded its handover, establishing a military post at the mine. The Armenian defense ministry refuted this account, stating that Azerbaijani forces, having found an Armenian border checkpoint unacceptable, contacted the Armenian side via loudspeaker and negotiated with Russian peacekeepers over the issue. Armenian and Azerbaijani authorities started to demarcate the border on the same day. Armenian military authorities then stated that half of the mine area had been passed to Azerbaijan.

Ahead of the transfer of Lachin District, a predominantly-Azerbaijani and Kurdish populated region before its occupation by the Armenian Armed Forces in 1992, which resulted in its population fleeing the region, and the Armenian forces burning Lachin, the district's administrative center, which was re-settled by ethnic Armenian migrants from Armenia, to Azerbaijan, some ethnic Armenians fled from the city of Lachin, despite the Russian supervision over the land corridor passing thorough the city, which links Nagorno-Karabakh with Armenia. The Russian peacekeepers also set up a post in a town previously called Zabukh by the local Azerbaijanis before it was destroyed in 1992, but later on the ruins there was built a village inhabited by Lebanese-Armenians. From 27 November, citing the city's self-proclaimed mayor, Narek Aleksanyan, who called on the ethnic Armenian population to flee the region, the Armenian media alleged that "the agreement has been amended," adding that Lachin, Sus, and Zabukh would not be handed over to Azerbaijan. These claims were refuted by the chairman of the Azerbaijan-based Center for Social Research, MP Zahid Oruj. According to BBC Russian Service correspondent, Yuri Vekdik, despite Aleksanyan's calls, the vast majority of Armenian settlers in Lachin, as well as the Lebanese-Armenians in Zabux, had fled the region. On 1 December, the Azerbaijani forces, with tanks and a column of trucks, entered the district, and the Azerbaijani MoD released footage from the city of Lachin. The Azerbaijani authorities stated that the district had suffered "great damage over the years", while it was administrated by the Republic of Artsakh as its Kashatagh Province.

== Legal status ==
During the first Nagorno-Karabakh War, the United Nations Security Council adopted four resolutions calling for the withdrawal of occupying forces from the territories surrounding Nagorno-Karabakh. In 2008, the United Nations General Assembly passed the Resolution 62/243 by 39 to 7, calling for the withdrawal of Armenian forces from the occupied territories of Azerbaijan.

- According to the resolution, the 7 adjacent districts were occupied territories of Azerbaijan.
- From the standpoint of the Nagorno-Karabakh, the 7 occupied districts were the territory of Azerbaijan temporarily occupied by the Nagorno-Karabakh Defense Army as a "security belt" until the provision of security guarantees for Nagorno-Karabakh and the establishment of control over the whole of the territory claimed by Nagorno-Karabakh, with the exception of the Lachin corridor linking Nagorno-Karabakh with Armenia (which the Republic of Nagorno-Karabakh stated it did not intend to return because of its strategic importance) However, the occupied territories were declared to be included in administrative territorial system of Nagorno-Karabakh as parts of its districts. In 2022, Nagorno-Karabakh parliament approved a bill that declared all territories that came under Azerbaijani control after the Second Nagorno-Karabakh War, including those outside of the former Nagorno-Karabakh Autonomous Oblast, to be "occupied".
- The European Court of Human Rights ruled on the case Chiragov and Others v. Armenia that Armenia "exercised effective control over Nagorno-Karabakh and the surrounding territories".

== See also ==
- Administrative divisions of Azerbaijan
- Administrative divisions of the Republic of Artsakh
