= Kashatagh Province =

Province of the Republic of Artsakh

Coordinates: 39.6408°N 46.5469°E

Kashatagh Քաշաթաղ
- Province
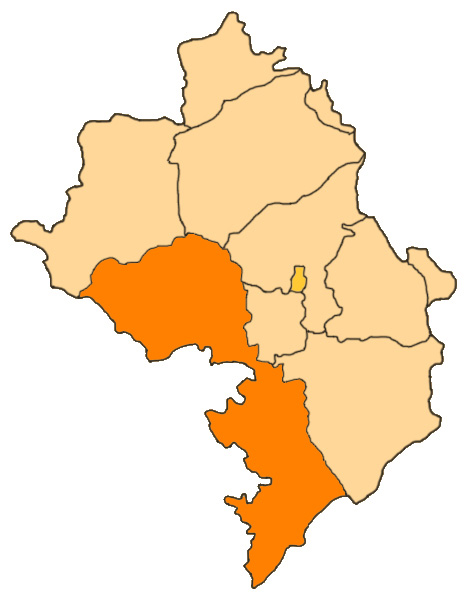
- Capital: Lachin (Berdzor)

Government
  - Governor: Stepan Sargsyan

Area
  - Total: 3,377 km^{2} (1,304 sq mi)
  - Rank: Ranked 1st

Population (2013)
  - Total: 9,656
  - Rank: Ranked 6th
  - Density: 2.859/km^{2} (7.406/sq mi)

Regions of Artsakh prior to the 2020 war: 1: Martakert; 2: Askeran; 3: Stepanakert (city); 4: Martuni; 5: Shushi; 6: Hadrut; 7: Shahumyan; 8: Kashatagh (Vertical dashed lines indicate territory outside of the former Nagorno-Karabakh Autonomous Oblast and Shahumyan Region. Horizontal dashed lines indicate territory under the control of Azerbaijan before the war.)

Kashatagh Province (Armenian: Քաշաթաղի շրջան) was a province of the Republic of Artsakh. It was the largest province by area (3,376.60 km^{2}). The population as of 2013 was 9,656. Its capital was Berdzor.

== Territorial entities ==
Kashatagh Region had 54 communities of which 3 were considered urban and 51 were rural.

== Geography ==
Kashtagh bordered the Shahumyan Province in the north, Martakert Province in the north-east, Askeran Province, Shushi Province and Hadrut Province in the east. Iran in the south and Armenia to the west.

== History ==
The territory of the Kashatagh Province was part of the Syunik Province of the Kingdom of Armenia. It was one of the many Caucasian areas administrated by a local melikdom known as the Melikdom of Kashatagh under the Persian Empire (Safavid, Afsharid, Zand and Qajar Iran). It was later included in the Nakhichevan Khanate. The territory remained predominantly Armenian up until the Russo-Persian wars and the South Caucasus invasion of the Ottoman army in the 18th century. Russian forces invaded the Caspian provinces of Persia, and in 1723 while simultaneously fighting the Afghans in the east and Turks in the west, Persia was forced to cede the Caspian provinces to the Russian Empire.

Kovsakan was the second largest city in Kashatagh Province after the city of Berdzor. Mher Arakelyan from the ARF, Razmik Mirzoyan, non-partisan, and Hrach Manucharyan were competing in the mayoral election held in June 2008.

From 1 December 2020, most of the Kashatagh Province was retaken by or returned to Azerbaijan, with the exception of the Lachin corridor containing the localities of Berdzor, Sus and Aghavno, which were controlled by the Russian peacekeepers until 26 August 2022.

== Demographics ==
The Kashatagh Province had the highest birth rate in the entire Caucasus region. The birth rate was measured at 29.3 per 1,000 in 2010. On the other hand, the Russian republic of Chechnya, which had a birth rate of 28.9 per 1,000 in 2011 could manage only the second spot.

- Birth Rate: 29.3 per 1,000
- Death Rate: 3.4 per 1,000
- Natural Growth: 2.60% per year

=== Resettlement of Syrian refugees ===
By June 2015, an estimated 17,000 Syrian Armenian's had fled the once 80,000-strong community in Syria and sought refuge in Armenia. David Babayan, spokesperson of the Artsakh president Bako Sahakyan, confirmed that some of those refugees had been resettled in Nagorno-Karabakh. In December 2014, Armenian media cited local municipal authorities in stating that "dozens of Syrian Armenian families" had been resettled in Nagorno-Karabakh's Kashatagh Province, specifically the city of Lachin (Berdzor in Armenian) and the village of Ishkhanadzor. 38 families, some 200 Syrian-Armenian refugees have resettled in the area.

== See also ==
For the districts of the Republic of Azerbaijan that overlap with the province, see: Zangilan District, Qubadli District, and Lachin District.
