= Khnatsakh =

Khnatsakh Խնածախ
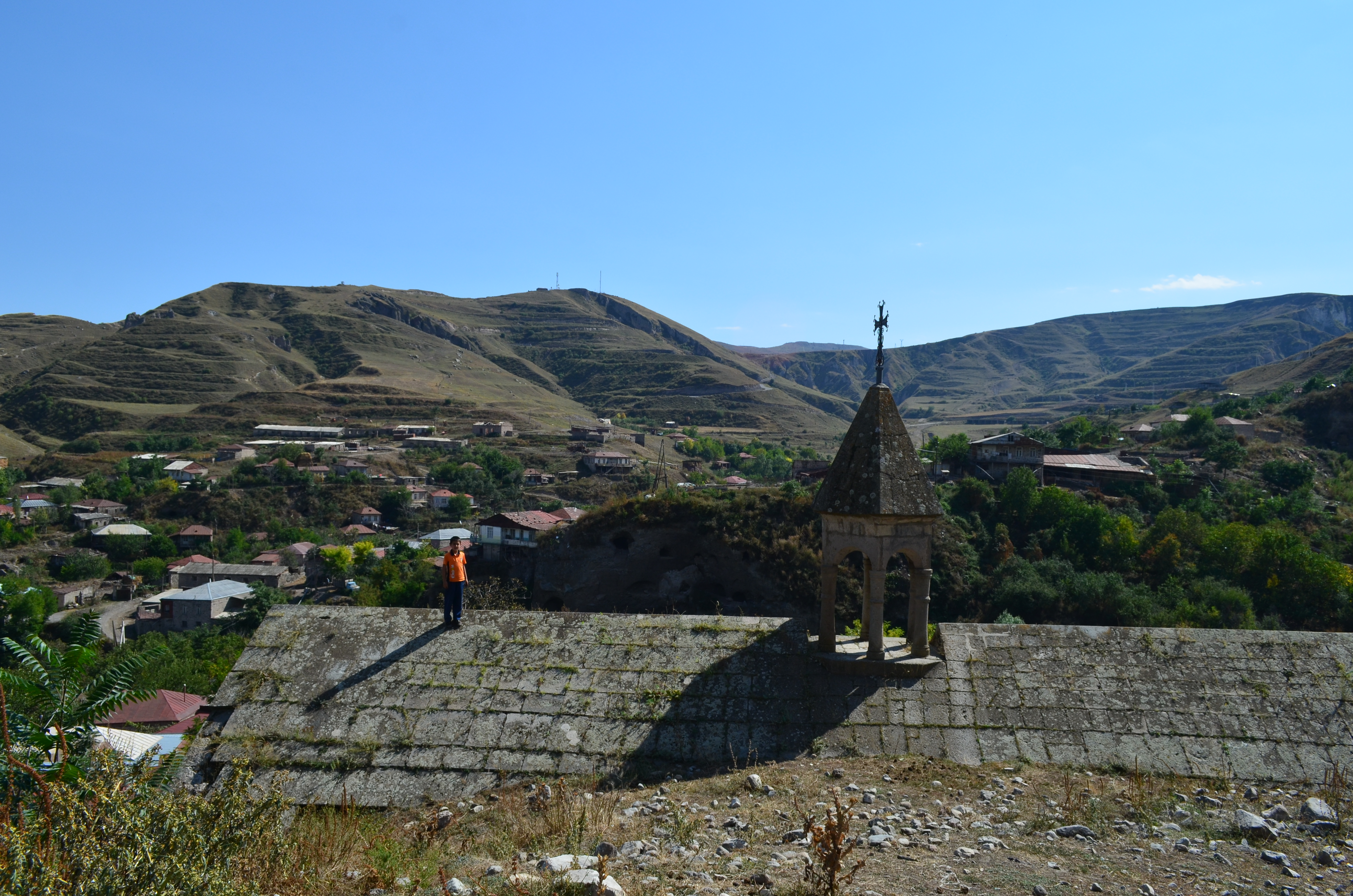
- Saint Hripsime and Khnatsakh skyline

- Location within Armenia Location within Syunik Province
- Coordinates: 39°36′13″N 46°23′34″E
- Country: Armenia
- Province: Syunik
- Municipality: Tegh

Area
  - Total: 29.41 km^{2} (11.36 sq mi)

Population (2011)
  - Total: 998
  - Density: 33.9/km^{2} (87.9/sq mi)
- Time zone: UTC+4 (AMT)

Khnatsakh (Armenian: Խնածախ) is a village in the Tegh Municipality of the Syunik Province in Armenia. Khnatsakh is known for being one of the residences of the meliks of Kashatagh and contains the partially ruined palace of Melik Hakhnazar I.

== History ==
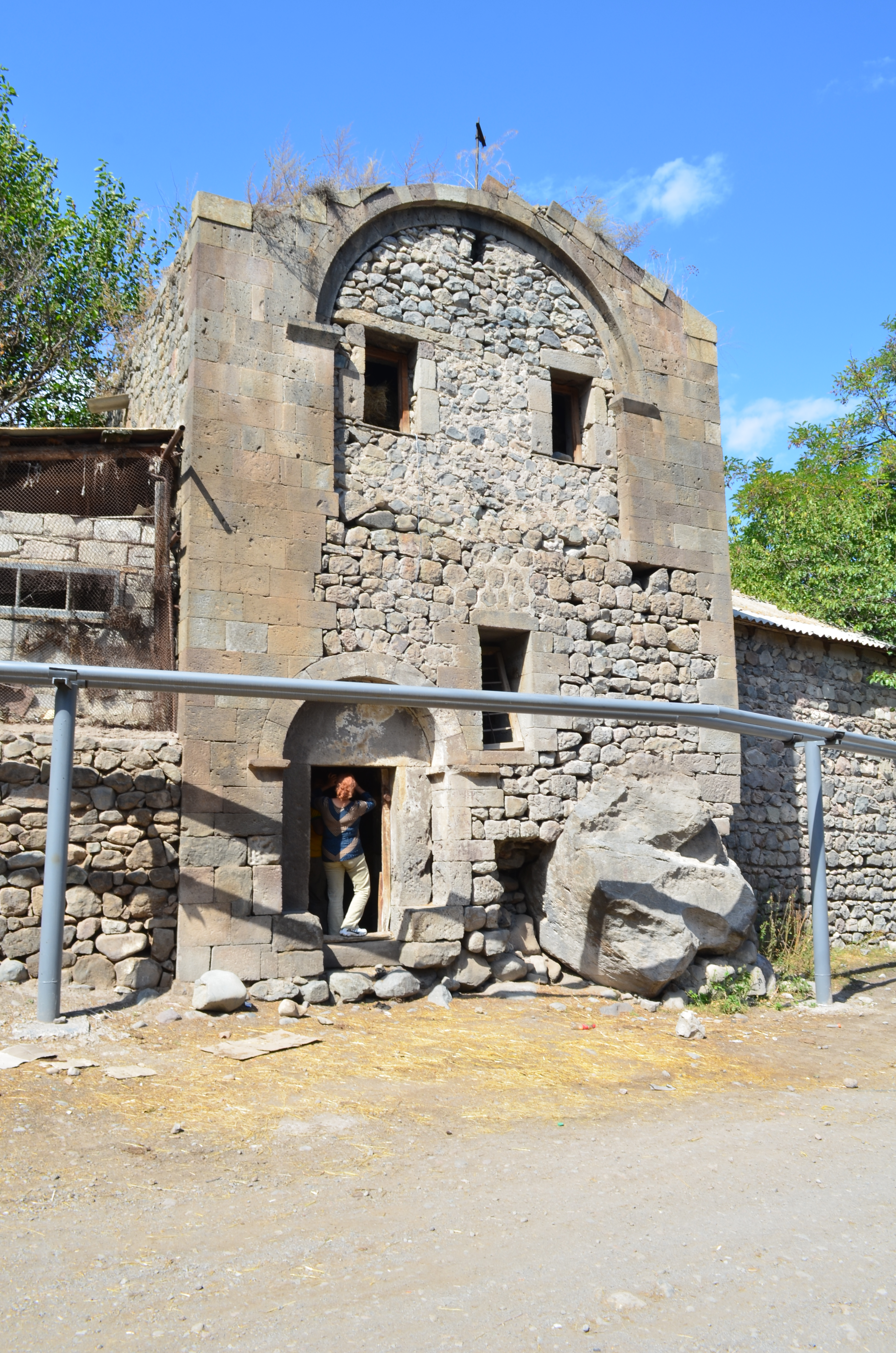
The ruins of the palace of Melik Hakhnazar I in Khnatsakh

=== Melikdom of Kashatagh ===
The Melikdom of Kashatagh was founded at the end of the 15th century by Melik Haykaz I, also the founder of the Melik-Haykazyan dynasty (the youngest branch of the Armenian princely dynasty of Proshyan). Previously, the Kashatagh region was first ruled by the Orbelian family, and then by the Shahurnetsi clan. Haykaz I was succeeded by his son, Hakhnazar I, who died in 1551. Hakhnazar's grave survived until the 1930s.

One of the ancient residences of the Kashatagh meliks is located in Khnatsakh and contains the partially ruined palace of Melik Hakhnazar I. Another palace of Melik Haykaz I, built in the late 15th century, is located close to the village of Melikashen (today Hüsülü), near the Tsitsernavank Monastery.

The names of Melik Hakhhnazar and his brother Haykaz (who is also mentioned in the document of 1691/92 as one of the witnesses) are part of the 1682 inscription on the facade of the entrance to the Church of the Holy Virgin in the village of Mirik.

== Demographics ==
The Statistical Committee of Armenia reported its population as 1,073 in 2010, up from 1,021 at the 2001 census.

== Gallery ==
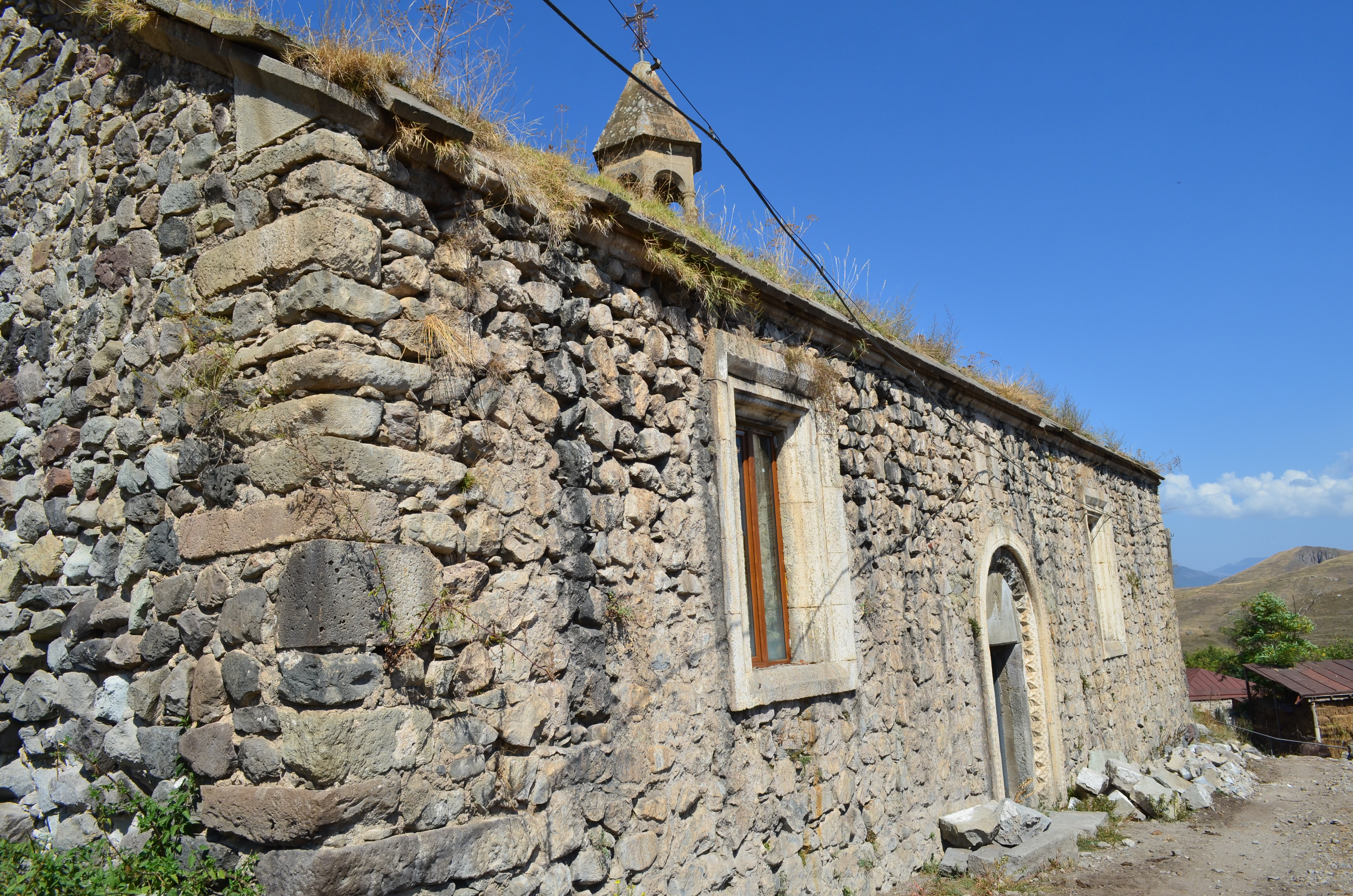
Saint Hripsime Church, Khnatsakh

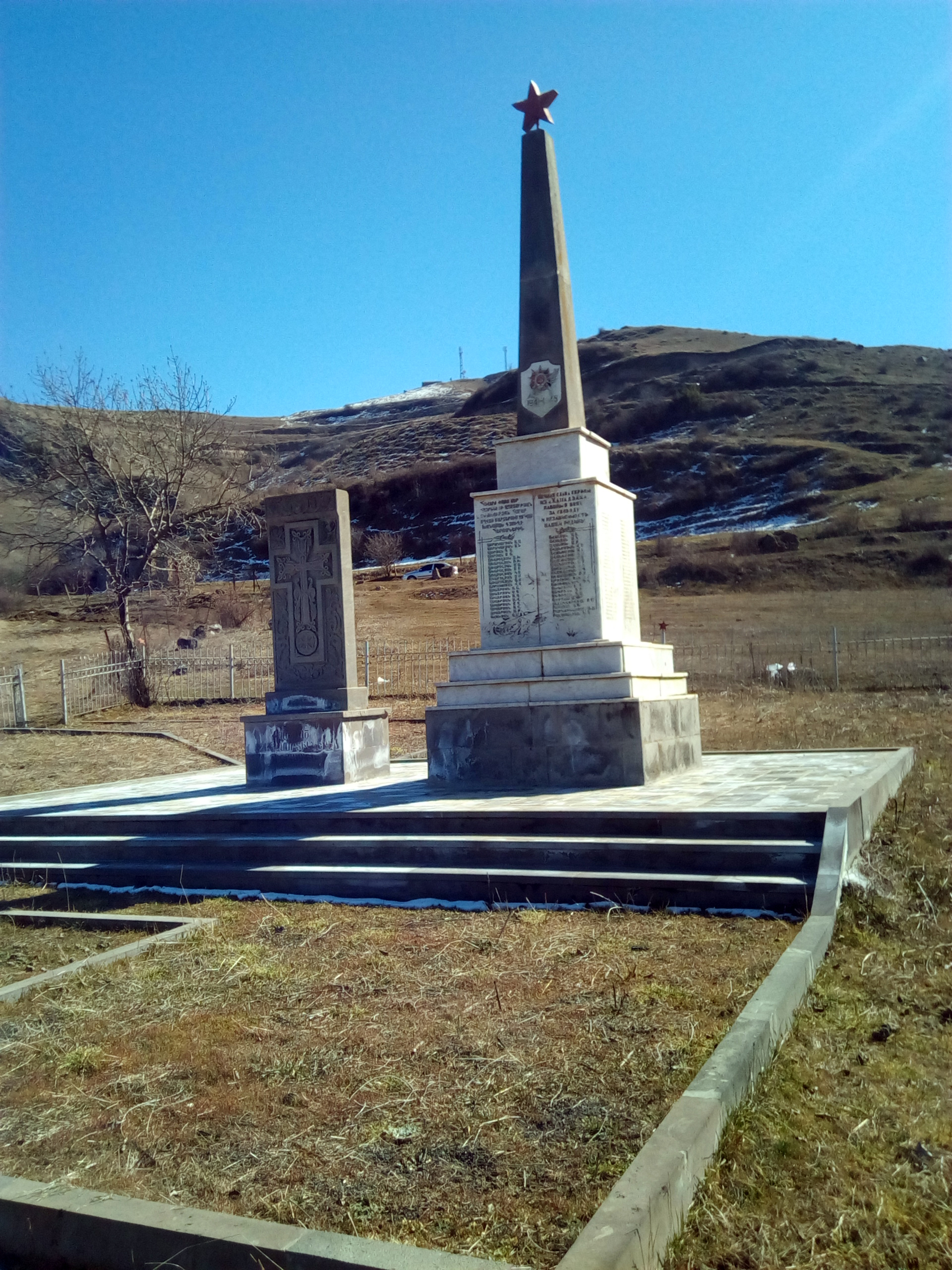
WWII memorial in Khnatsakh

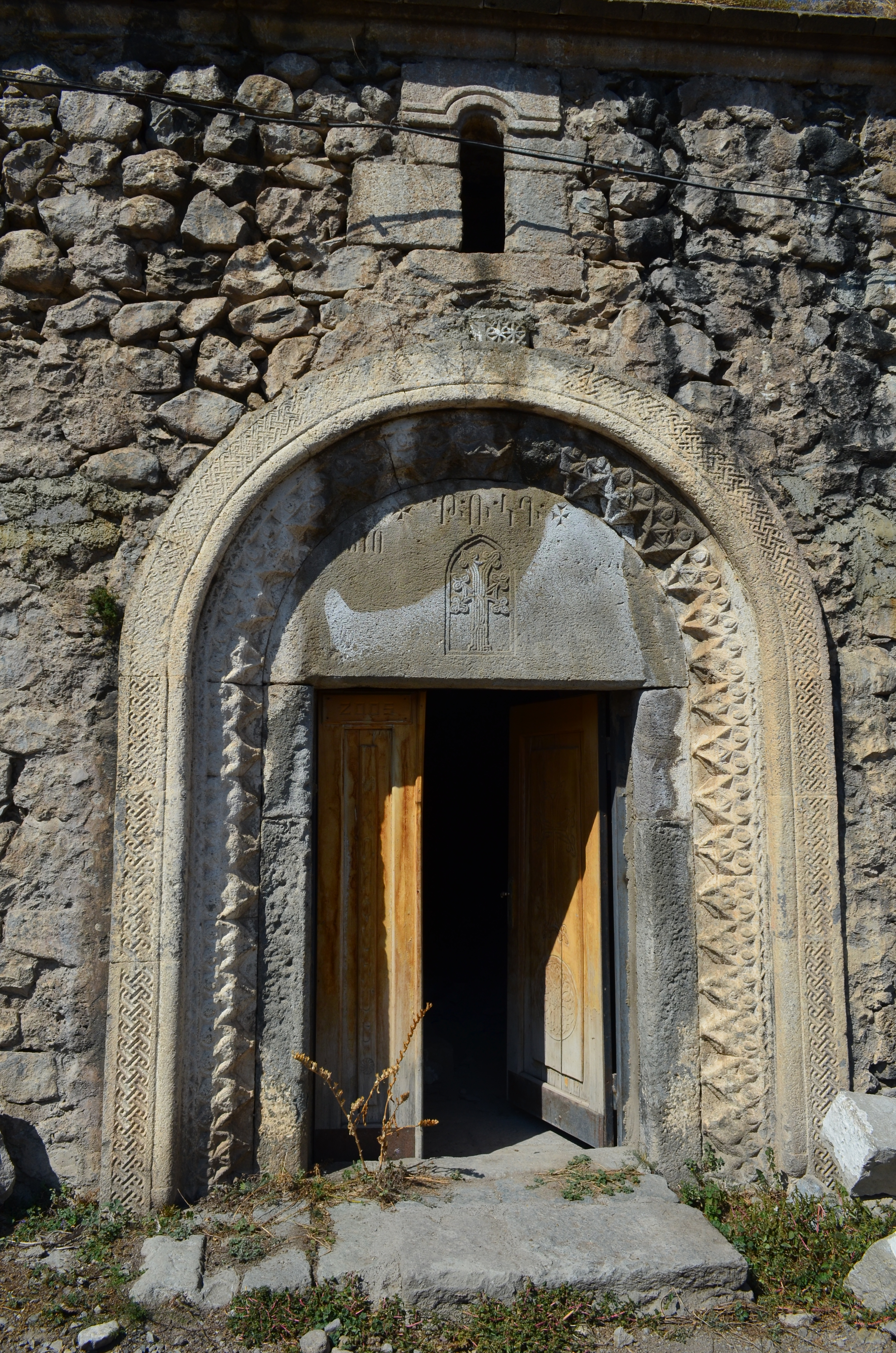
Door of Saint Hripsime Church, Khnatsakh

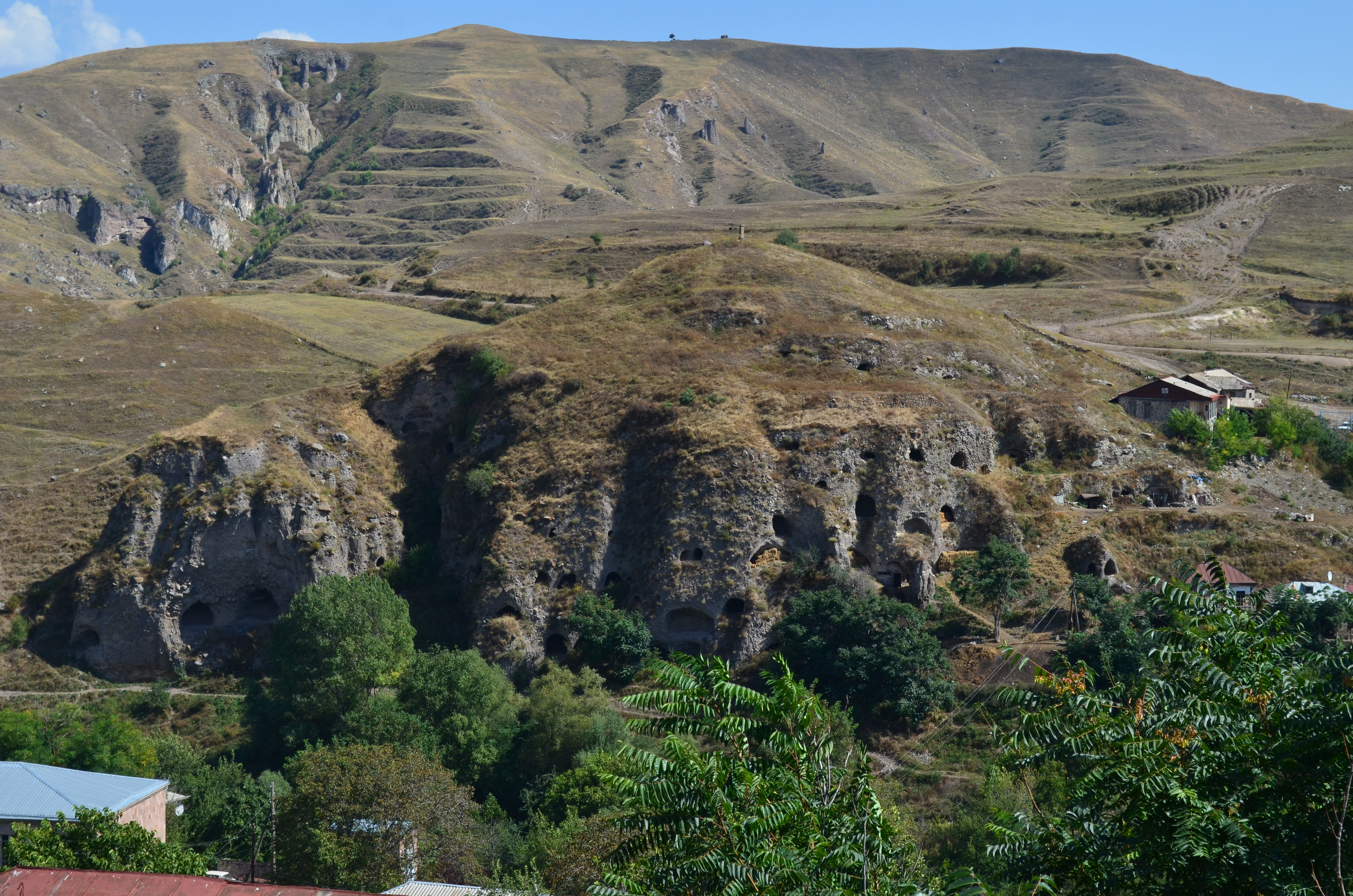
Cliff dwellings

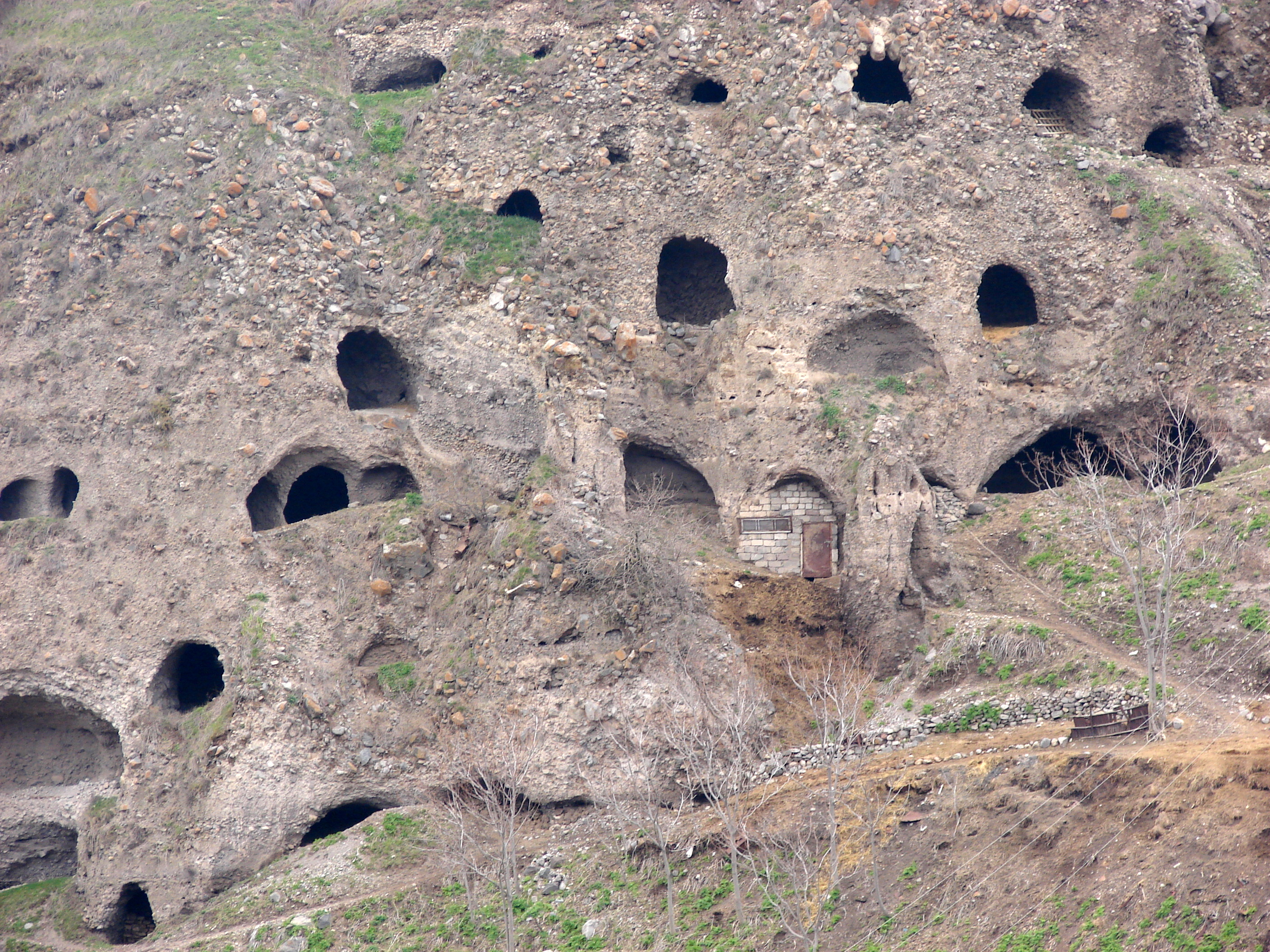
Cliff dwellings

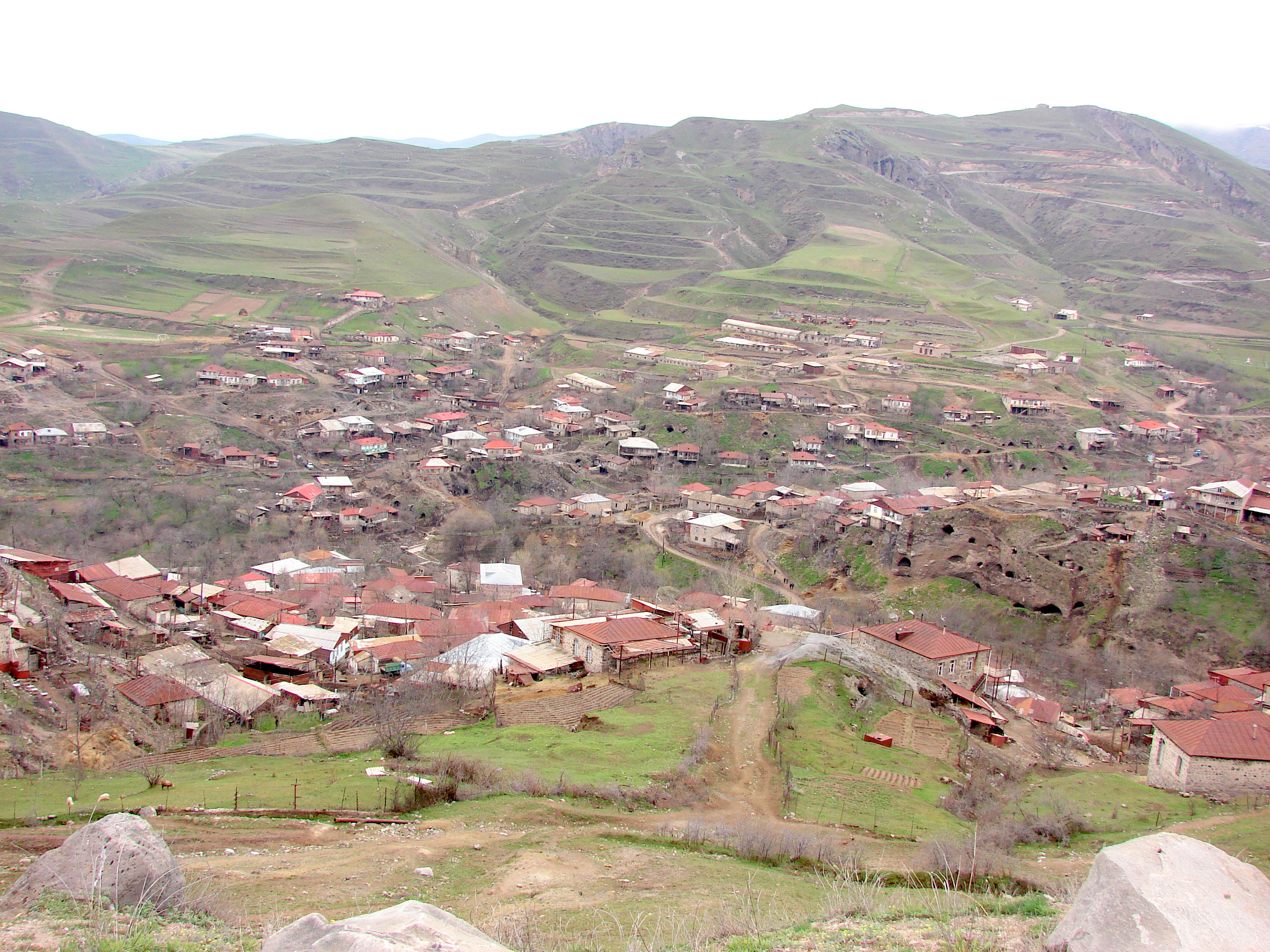
View of the village
