= Oratağ =

Oratag or Oratağ or Horrat’agh, or Horatagh may refer to:

- Aşağı Oratağ, Azerbaijan
- Yuxarı Oratag, Azerbaijan
