= Melikdom of Kashatagh =

Armenian feudal entity

Melikdom of Kashatagh Քաշաթաղի մելիքություն
- 1475–1730
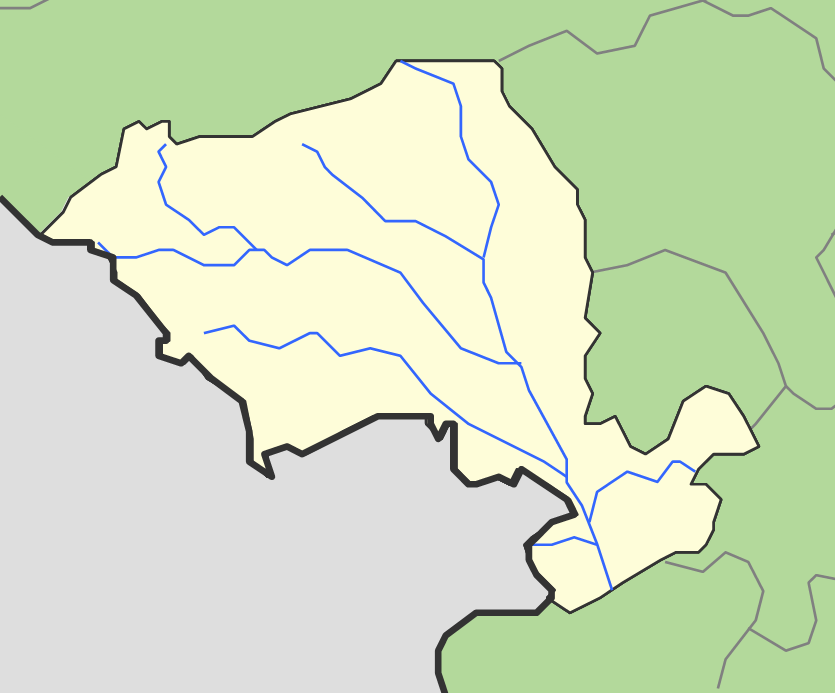
- Borders of the Lachin District, which are roughly similar to those of the melikdom
- Status: Principality
- Capital: Kashataghk 1475–1520 Khnatsakh 1520–1730
- Common languages: Armenian
- Religion: Armenian Apostolic
- Government: Principality (Melikdom)
- Historical era: Iranian Armenia
  - Established: 1475
  - Disestablished: 1730
Preceded by	Succeeded by
Orbelian Dynasty; Kingdom of Artsakh	Karabakh Khanate
- Today part of: Azerbaijan; Armenia

The Melikdom of Kashatagh (Armenian: Քաշաթաղի մելիքություն) was an Armenian melikdom (principality) which existed in the 15th–18th centuries. It was located along the Hakari River, on the southeastern section of the modern border of Armenia and Azerbaijan. The residences of the meliks were located in the villages of Kashataghk and Khnatsakh, in the west of the present Lachin District of Azerbaijan and the east of the present Syunik region of Armenia respectively.

== History ==
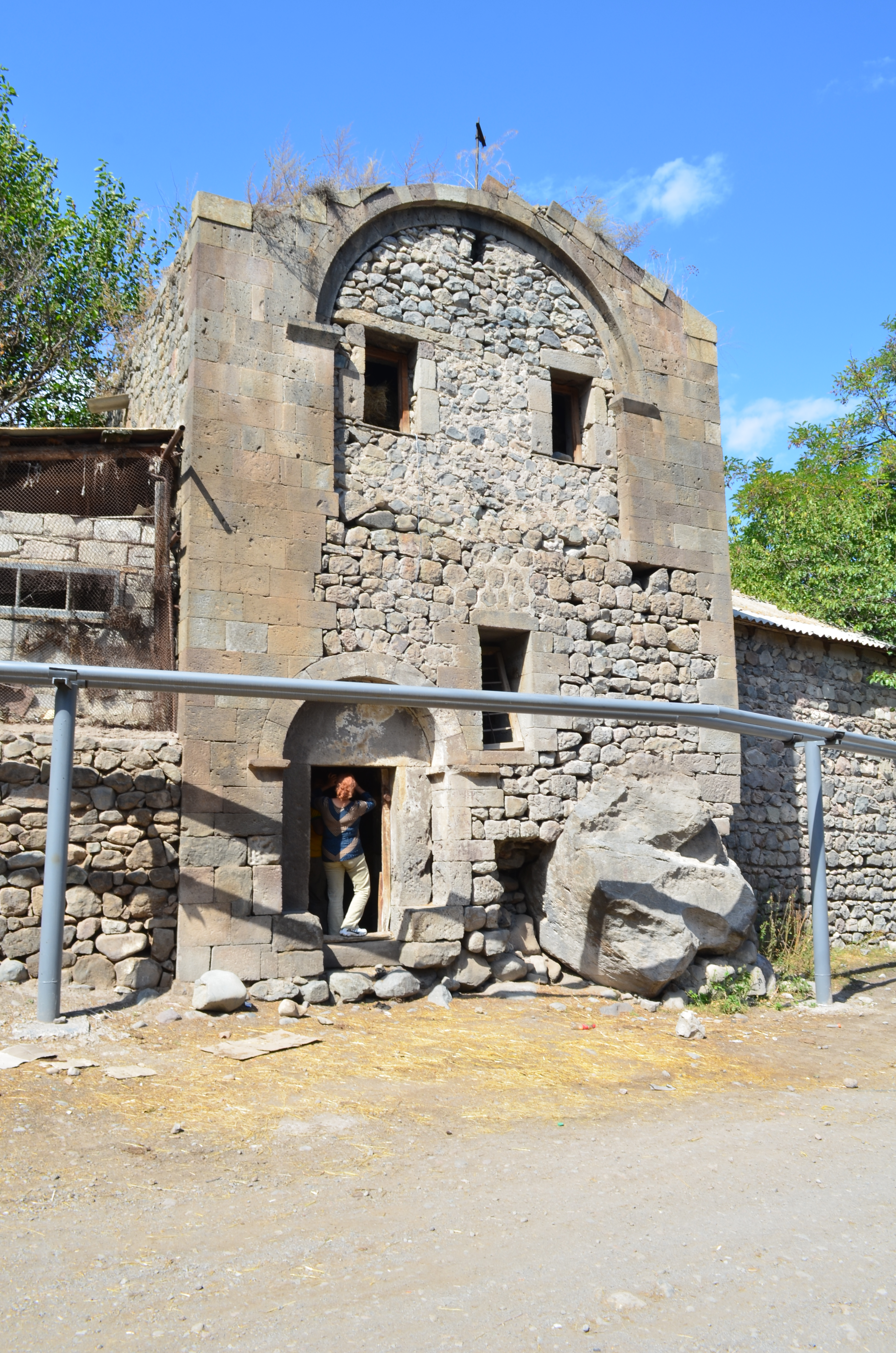
The ruins of the palace of Melik Hakhnazar I in the village of Khnatsakh

The Melikdom of Kashatagh was founded at the end of the 15th century by Melik Haykaz I, also the founder of the Melik-Haykazyan dynasty (the youngest branch of the Armenian princely dynasty of Proshyan). Previously, the Kashatagh region was first ruled by the Orbelian family, and then by the Shahurnetsi clan.

According to historical evidence such as the accounts of Arakel of Tabriz, Melik Haykazyan, the first dynastic ruler of the melikdoms of Aghahech-Kashatagh (1450–1520), made Kashataghk his capital. The whole region was named Kashatagh after this princely residence. The Melik Haykaz Palace was built at the end of the 15th century on an artificial slope surrounded by a fortified wall with towers and gates. Being constructed in 1480, the complex is one of the earliest surviving examples of secular Armenian architecture.

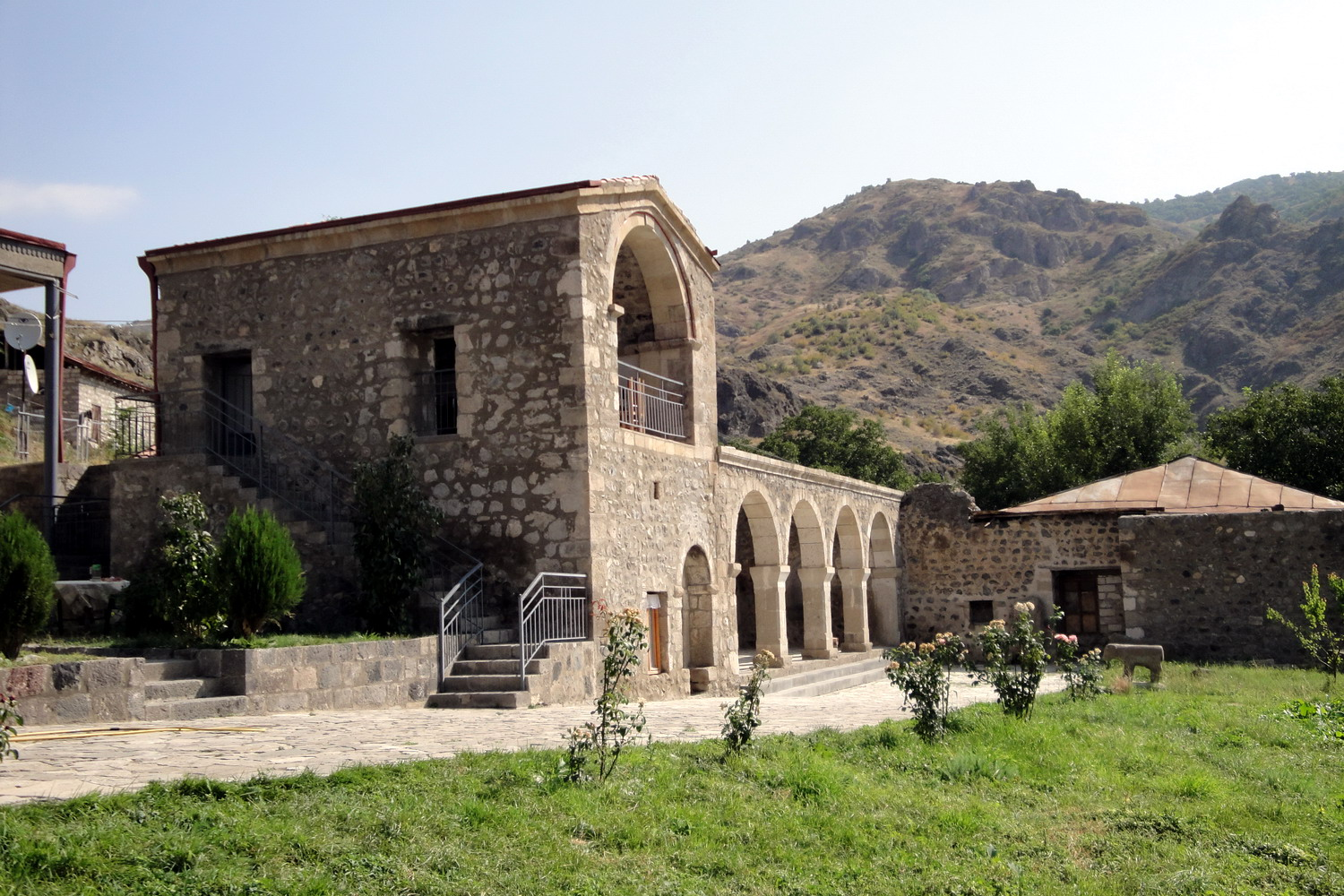
The Princely Palace of Armenian Melik Haykazyan

Melik Haykaz I was succeeded by a son, Hakhnazar I. Hakhnazar died in 1551; his grave survived until the 1930s. Hakhnazar's palace in Khnatsakh has survived to this day.

The most prominent member of the dynasty was Melik Haykaz II, who was melik from 1551 to 1623 and an active supporter of Iran during the Turkish-Persian wars for the possession of Transcaucasia. Arakel of Tabriz mentions him as one of the noble Armenians and advisers at the court of Shah of Iran Abbas I.

According to historian Morus Hasratyan, Haykaz II lived in exile in Iran for 10–15 years due to the Ottoman Empire's brutal policies during the temporary occupation of Transcaucasia in the 1580s or 90s. After the reconquest of the region by Iran in 1606–1607, Haykaz II, as one of the loyal supporters of the Shah, was not only restored to his rights but also received some possessions beyond its borders. A decree (ferman) of Shah Abbas I contains a list of the services provided by the melik to Iranian authorities. The decree itself has no date, but the date of 999 of the Hijrah (1590/1591) exists on the seal used by Abbas I.

In 1699, Melik Emirbek of Kashatagh, son of Melik Martiros, participated in the Angeghakot Assembly where the Armenian meliks decided to authorize a delegation led by Israel Ori to negotiate with the leaders of European powers such as Peter the Great on the liberation of historic Armenia.

The names of Haykaz I, Hakhnazar I, Haykaz II and their descendants are found in tombstones preserved on gravestones from the 16th–18th centuries. A document written in Persian on behalf of the Melikdom of Kashatagh in 1691/92 has been preserved. It includes the joint appeal of Melik Hakhnazar and his subordinate village headmen (Armenian: tanuter, Persian: kadkhudā), addressed to the shah's court. In the document, they appoint as their authorized representatives the son of Melik Hakhnazar, Ilyas (Elias), and one of the elders, Gikor, who were supposed to present the problems arising in the region to the shah's court and defend the interests of the local population.

The names of Melik Hakhnazar and his brother Haykaz (who is also mentioned in the document of 1691/92 as one of the witnesses) are marked in the inscription of 1682 on the facade of the entrance to the Church of the Holy Virgin in the village of Mirik of the Kashatagh region.

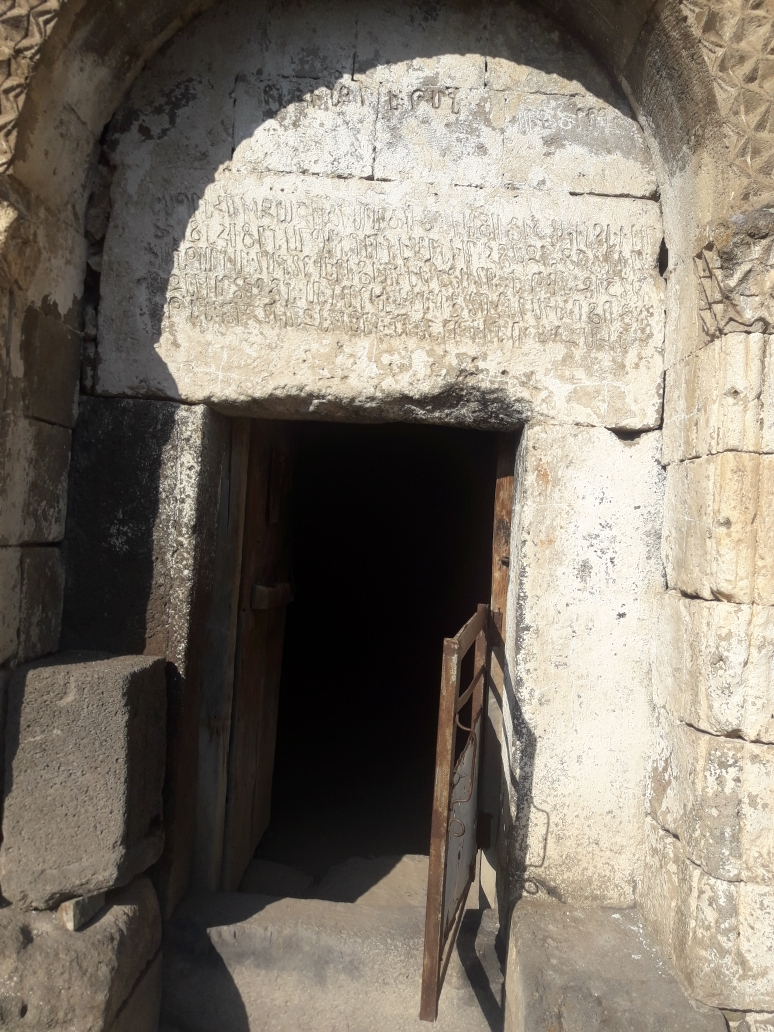
1682 Inscription about Melik Hakhnazar/Haykaz on the Church of the Holy Virgin in Mirik

== Demise ==
The Armenian population of Kashatagh left in the years 1730–1750. A number of settlements in the district were abandoned by the second half of the 18th century. It was later included in the Karabakh Khanate. By the end of the 18th century and the beginning of the 19th century, most of the abandoned Armenian villages were populated by Kurdish and Turkic nomads. It is not known when the last members of the princely Melik-Haykazyan family left Kashatagh, but some of their descendants were living in Shaki, Kutaisi, and elsewhere by the early 19th century. Following the Russo-Persian Wars, this area became part of the Zangezur Uyezd of the Elisabethpol Governorate of the Russian Empire. By the time the Russians arrived, the indigenous Armenians of the region only had a significant population left in Lachin. The Armenian population of Lachin left during the Soviet period and the other villages in the Lachin district were also subsequently abandoned by their Armenian population. During that time, the area became part of Red Kurdistan until 1929. Starting in the 1930s, this area was administered as a part of Soviet Azerbaijan until the First Nagorno-Karabakh War when Armenia occupied the region. After the 2020 Nagorno-Karabakh War, the Lachin District was returned to Azerbaijan.

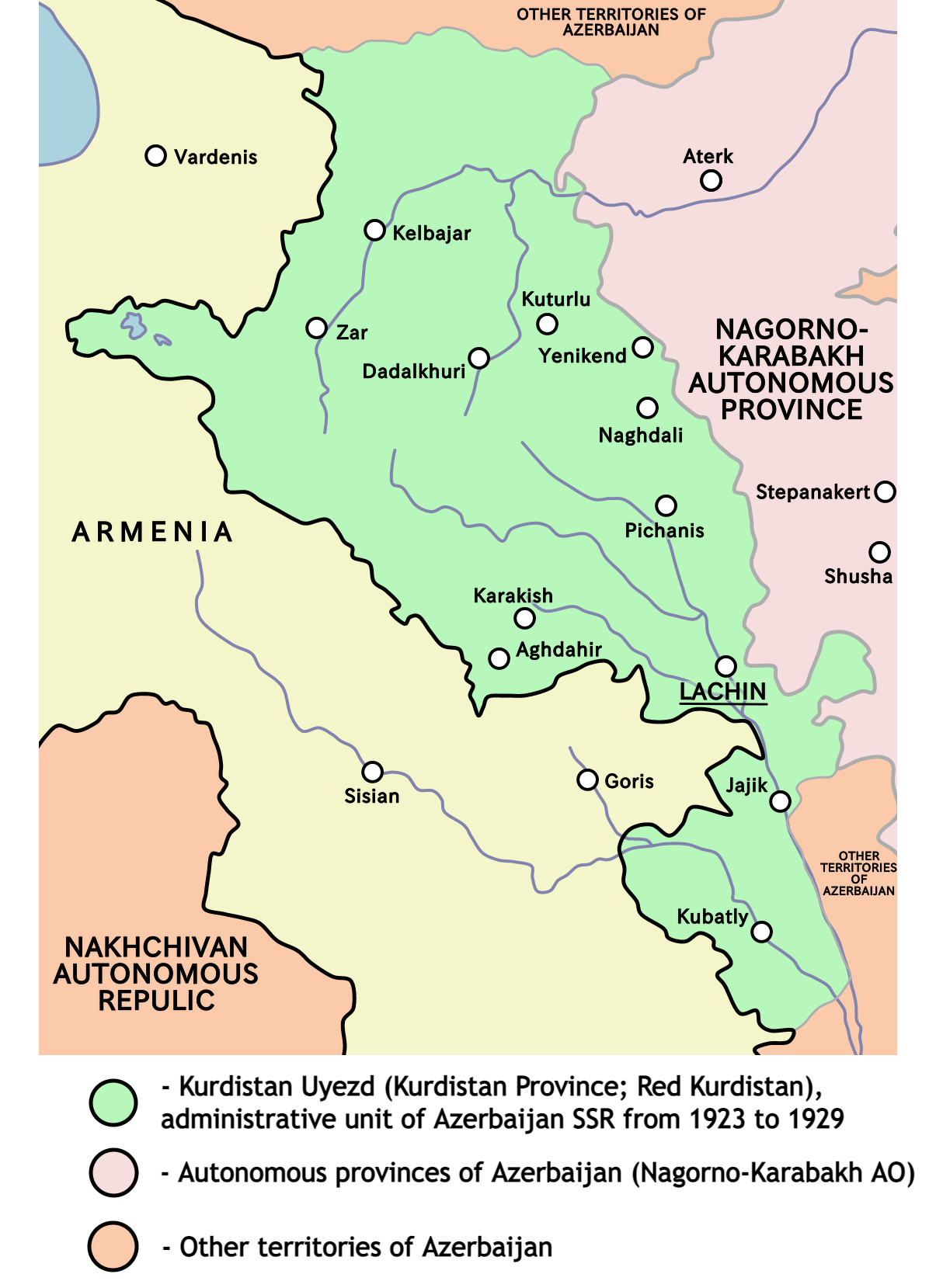
Red Kurdistan (1923-1928)

== Legacy ==
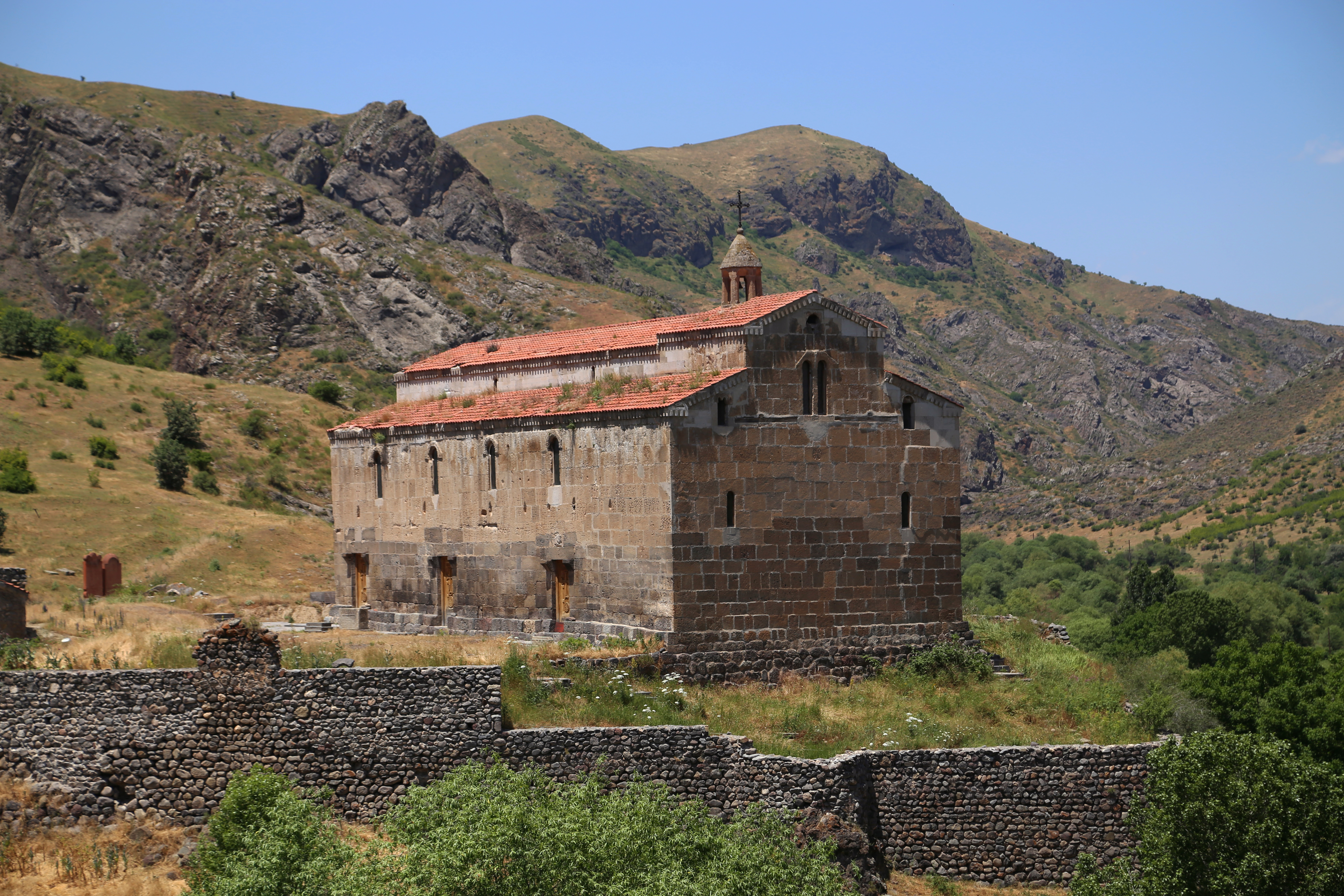
Tsiternavank Monastery (5th–7th centuries)

Kashatagh is home to 30 churches and chapels built between the 4th century and the beginning of the 18th century. Tsitsernavank Monastery is an example of Armenian culture in the region. There are numerous khachkars, palaces, and Armenian tombstones in the region which were left behind by the melikdom.

== See also ==
- Melikdoms of Karabakh
