= Hüsülü, Lachin =

Husulu Hüsülü
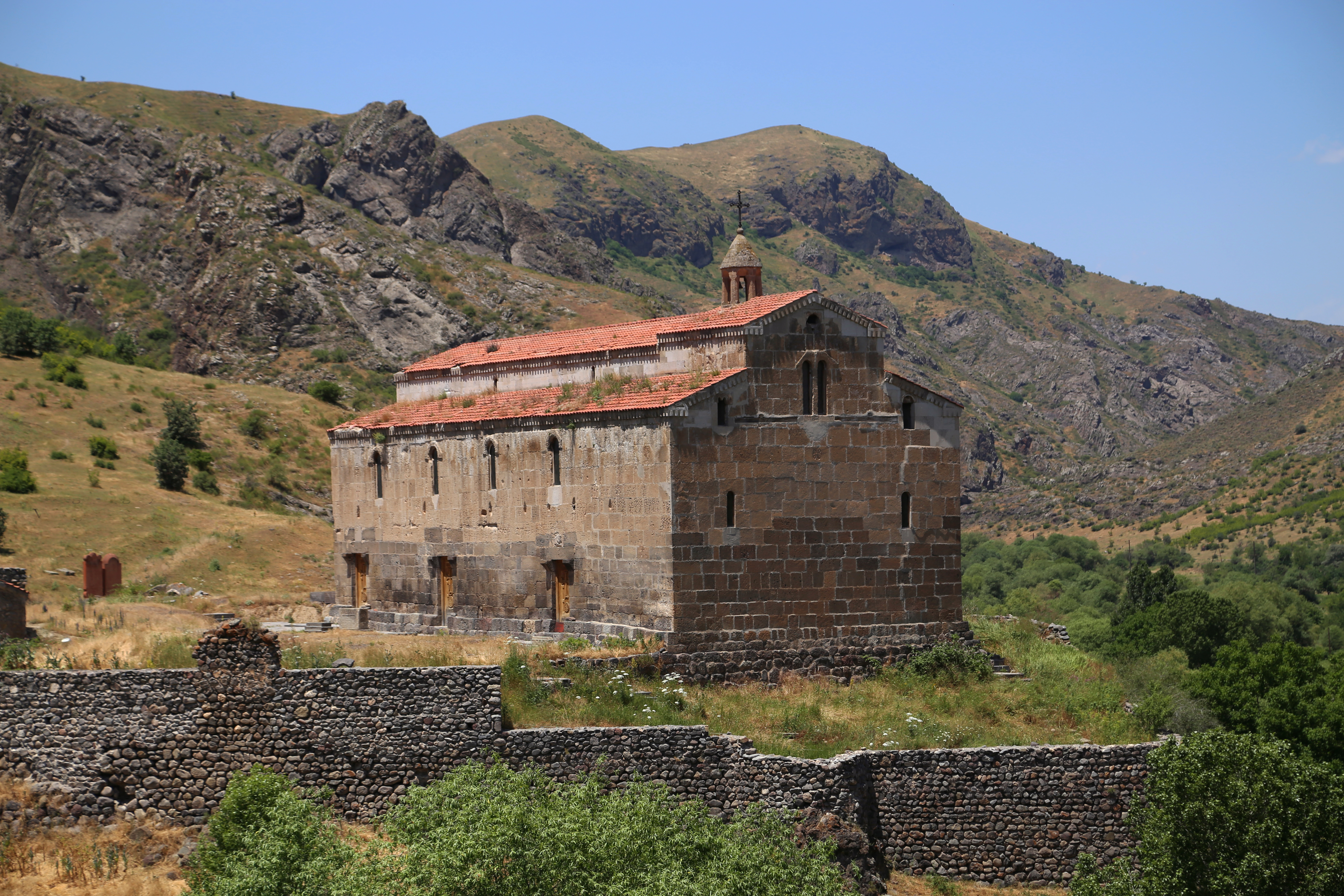
- Tsitsernavank Monastery (5th–7th centuries)

- Location within Azerbaijan Location within East Zangezur Economic Region
- Coordinates: 39°38′30″N 46°24′34″E
- Country: Azerbaijan
- District: Lachin
- Elevation: 1,291 m (4,236 ft)

Population (2015)
  - Total: 113 (per Artsakh)
- Time zone: UTC+4 (AZT)

Husulu (Azerbaijani: Hüsülü), historically also known as Kashataghk (Armenian: Քաշաթաղք) is a village in the Lachin District of Azerbaijan, located close to the villages of Malıbəy (Melikashen), Qarıqışlaq (Tandzut) and Ağoğlan. Kashataghk/Husulu is known for being the first capital of the Armenian Meliktom of Kashatagh.

Armenian monuments such as the Tsitsernavank Monastery from between the 5th and 7th centuries, and the 15th-century Melik Haykaz Palace are located near the village.

== History ==
Most Armenian historians identify the village with Kashataghk, a settlement mentioned by the 13th-century Armenian historian Stephen Orbelian (one Armenian historian, Armen Gharagyozian, instead identifies Kashataghk with the nearby village of Qarıqışlaq). Despite the village's small size and population, the whole region of Kashatagh was named after this settlement due to it being a princely residence of the Armenian Meliks of Kashatagh.

The Kurdish population that settled in the Kashatagh region after the deportation of the Armenian population from the region by Shah Abbas I referred to the village as Sultankand; according to historian Samvel Karapetyan, this is because the inhabitants knew about the location's past as a princely residence. The name has also been rendered as Sultanlar and Sultanlı.

Under the rule of the Russian Empire, the settlement was administered as part of the Zangezur Uyezd of the Elisabethpol Governorate. During the Soviet period, the village was part of Red Kurdistan until its abolition in 1929. Thereafter, it was administered as part of the Lachin District. In 1931, the village received its current name, after the Azerbaijani communist official Hüsü Hajiyev.

The village was located in the Armenian-occupied territories surrounding Nagorno-Karabakh, coming under the control of ethnic Armenian forces during the First Nagorno-Karabakh War in the early 1990s. The village subsequently became part of the breakaway Republic of Artsakh as part of its Kashatagh Province, where it was known as Tsitsernavank (Armenian: Ծիծեռնավանք), with the Tsitsernavank community including the village of Melikashen (Armenian: Մելիքաշեն). It was returned to Azerbaijan as part of the 2020 Nagorno-Karabakh ceasefire agreement.

== Historical heritage sites ==
Historical heritage sites in and around the village include the monastery of Tsitsernavank (Ծիծեռնավանք) from between the 5th and 7th centuries, khachkars from between the 8th and 17th centuries, two 20th-century tombstones, and the 15th-century Melik Haykaz Palace (Armenian: Մելիք Հայկազի ապարանք, romanized: Melik Haykazi Aparank), which was the palace of an Armenian melik, Melik Haykaz, the first ruler of the Melikdom of Kashatagh. The palace follows the classical architectural style of an Armenian melik palace, and was built on a slope surrounded by a fortified wall with towers and gates. It had several floors, with Melik Haykaz's living room being located on the ground floor and his throne room being located on the second floor. The palace underwent renovation between 1989 and 1992, and was turned into a hotel in 2007. Azerbaijani sources refer to the structure as Hamza Sultan Palace, attributing it to an 18th-century local ruler named Hamza Sultan of the Qaraçorlu tribe.

== Demographics ==
According to administrative data from 1886, the settlement (recorded as two villages taken together, "First Sultankand" and "Second Sultankand") had 151 inhabitants.

The village had 113 inhabitants in 2005, and 113 inhabitants in 2015.

== Gallery ==
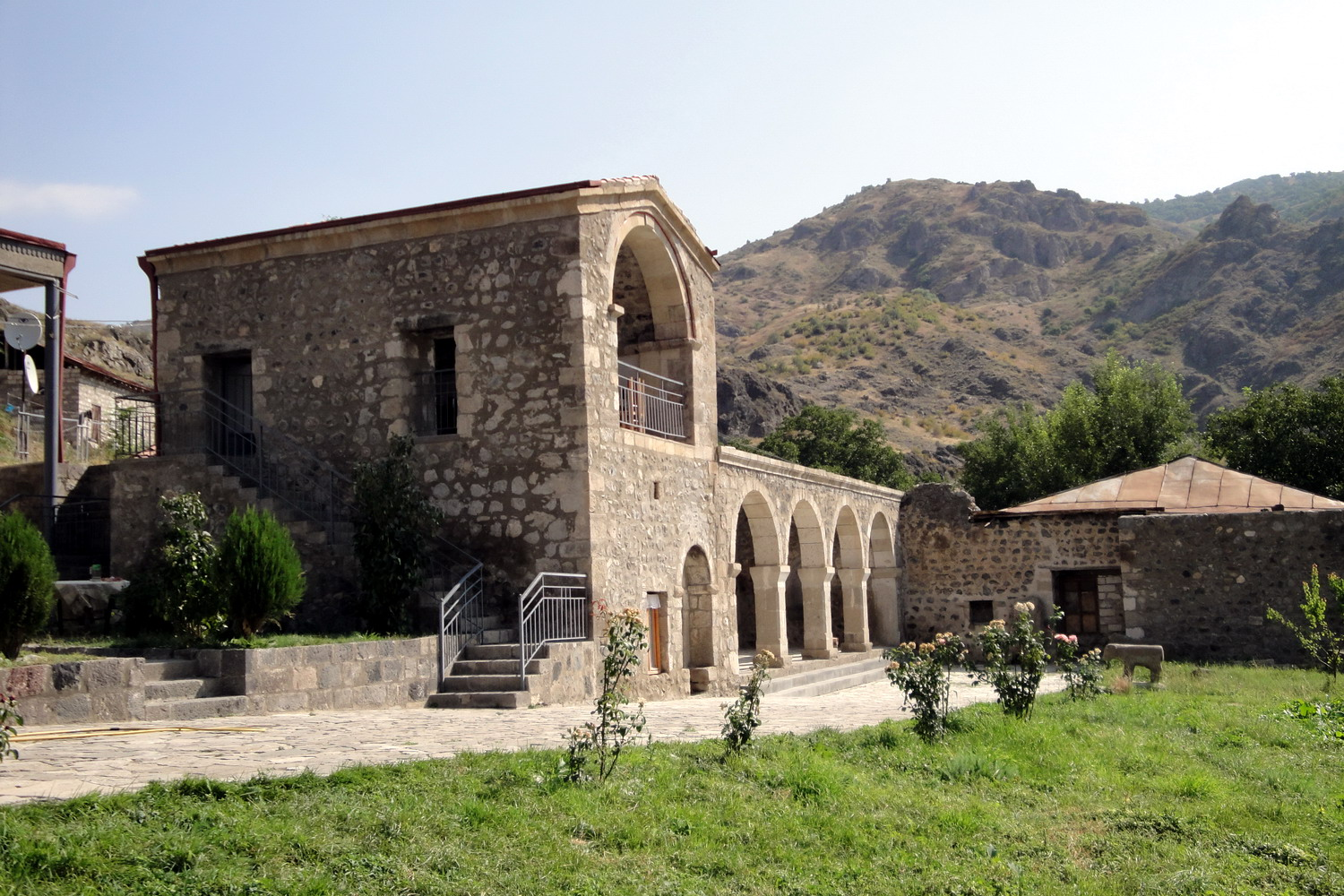
The Palace of Armenian Melik Haykazyan
