= Kashatagh =

Kashatagh or Qashatagh may refer to:

- Melikdom of Kashatagh, an Armenian principality in the 15th–18th centuries
- Kashatagh Province, a former province of the Republic of Artsakh
