= Kamil Nasibov =

Azerbaijani soldier

- Born: October 8, 1946; Bozlu, Lachin District, Azerbaijan
- Died: June 29, 1992 (aged 45); Lachin District, Azerbaijan
- Military career
- Allegiance: Republic of Azerbaijan
- Service years: 1991-1992
- Conflicts: First Nagorno-Karabakh War
- Awards: National Hero of Azerbaijan; 1993

Kamil Nasibov (Azerbaijani: Kamil Balədə oğlu Nəsibov) (8 October 1946, Bozlu, Lachin District, Azerbaijan – 29 June 1992, Lachin District, Azerbaijan) was a soldier in the First Nagorno-Karabakh War and officially claimed National Hero of Azerbaijan. He was of Kurdish descent.

== Early life and education ==
Kamil Nasibov was born on 8 October 1946 in Bozlu village of Lachin District of Azerbaijan SSR. He was an ethnic Kurd. In 1963, he completed his secondary education at Minkend village secondary school. From 1963 through 1966, Nasibov served in the Soviet Armed Forces. In 1976, he entered Azerbaijan Polytechnical Institute.

=== Personal life ===
Kamil Nasibov was married and had four children.

== First Nagorno-Karabakh war ==
When Lachin was attacked by the Armenian Armed Forces in 1992, Nasibov created a self-defense unit of volunteers that consisted of 30 people. Nasibov participated in the battles around the villages of Sadinlar, Malibeyli, Khanallar, Suarası with his self-defense unit.

On June 29, 1992, Kamil Nasibov was seriously wounded in a battle for the Blind Heavens and soldiers wanted to take him safely, but he did not leave the battlefield and eventually died of bleeding.

== Honors ==
Kamil Nasibov was buried at a cemetery in Aghjabadi. By the Decree of the President of Azerbaijan No. 457 dated February 5, 1993, he was posthumously awarded the title of the National Hero of Azerbaijan.

== See also ==
- First Nagorno-Karabakh War
- National Hero of Azerbaijan

== Sources ==
- Vugar Asgarov. Azərbaycanın Milli Qəhrəmanları (Yenidən işlənmiş II nəşr). Bakı: "Dərələyəz-M", 2010, səh. 226.
