= Malıbəy =

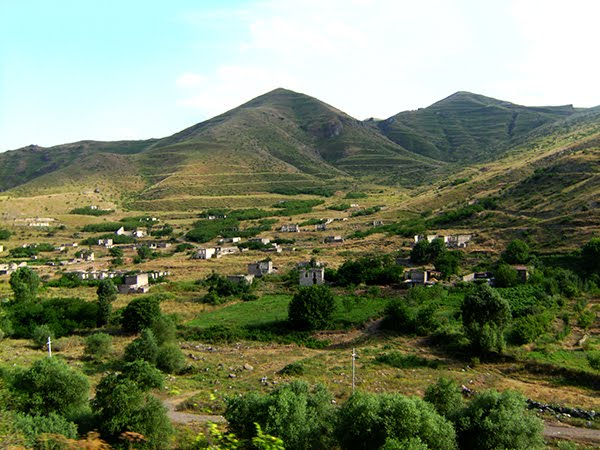

- Location within Azerbaijan Location within East Zangezur Economic Region
- Coordinates: 39°37′13″N 46°26′08″E
- Country: Azerbaijan
- District: Lachin

Population (2015)
  - Total: 51
- Time zone: UTC+4 (AZT)

Malıbəy (Malybey) is a village in the Lachin District of Azerbaijan.

== History ==
The village was located in the Armenian-occupied territories surrounding Nagorno-Karabakh, coming under the control of ethnic Armenian forces during the First Nagorno-Karabakh War in the early 1990s. Subsequently, it became part of the breakaway Republic of Artsakh as part of its Kashatagh Province, where it was known as Melikashen (Armenian: Մելիքաշեն). It was returned to Azerbaijan as part of the 2020 Nagorno-Karabakh ceasefire agreement.

== Historical heritage sites ==
Historical heritage sites in and around the village include the 15th-century Melik Haykaz Palace (Armenian: Մելիք Հայկազի ապարանք, romanized: Melik Haykazi Aparank), a 17th-century khachkar, and two 17th/18th-century ram-shaped tombstones.

== Gallery ==
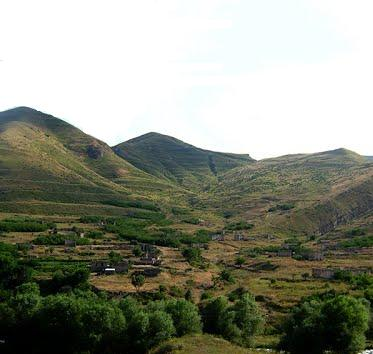
