= Mirik, Azerbaijan =

Mirik Միրիկ Mîrîk
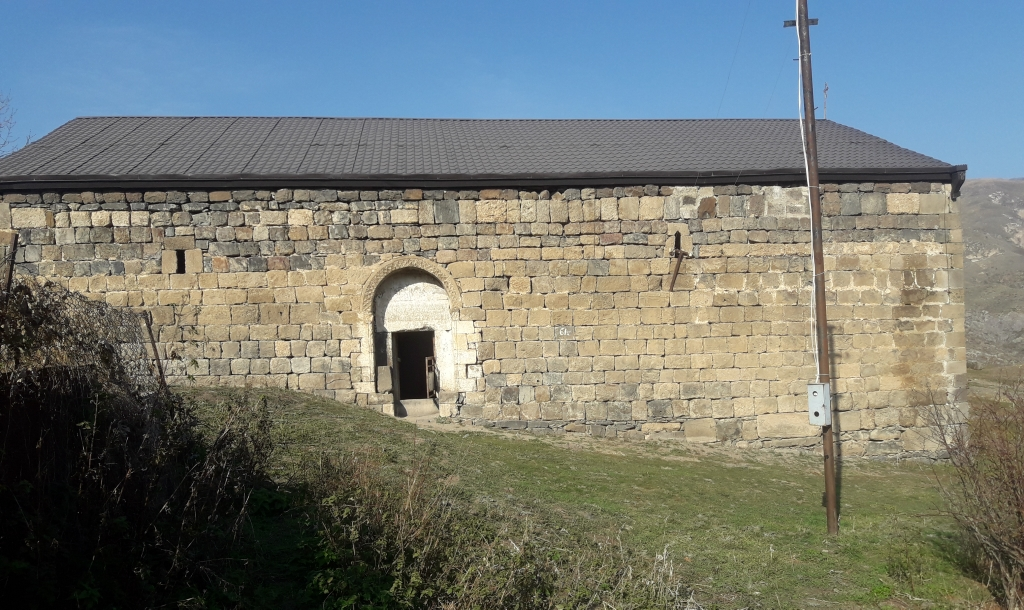
- Armenian church of Surb Astvatsatsin in Mirik

- Location within Azerbaijan Location within East Zangezur Economic Region
- Coordinates: 39°41′19″N 46°19′57″E
- Country: Azerbaijan
- District: Lachin

Population (2015)
  - Total: 179
- Time zone: UTC+4 (AZT)
- Area code: +994 26

Mirik (Armenian: Միրիկ; Kurdish: Mîrîk) is a village in the Lachin District of Azerbaijan.

== History ==
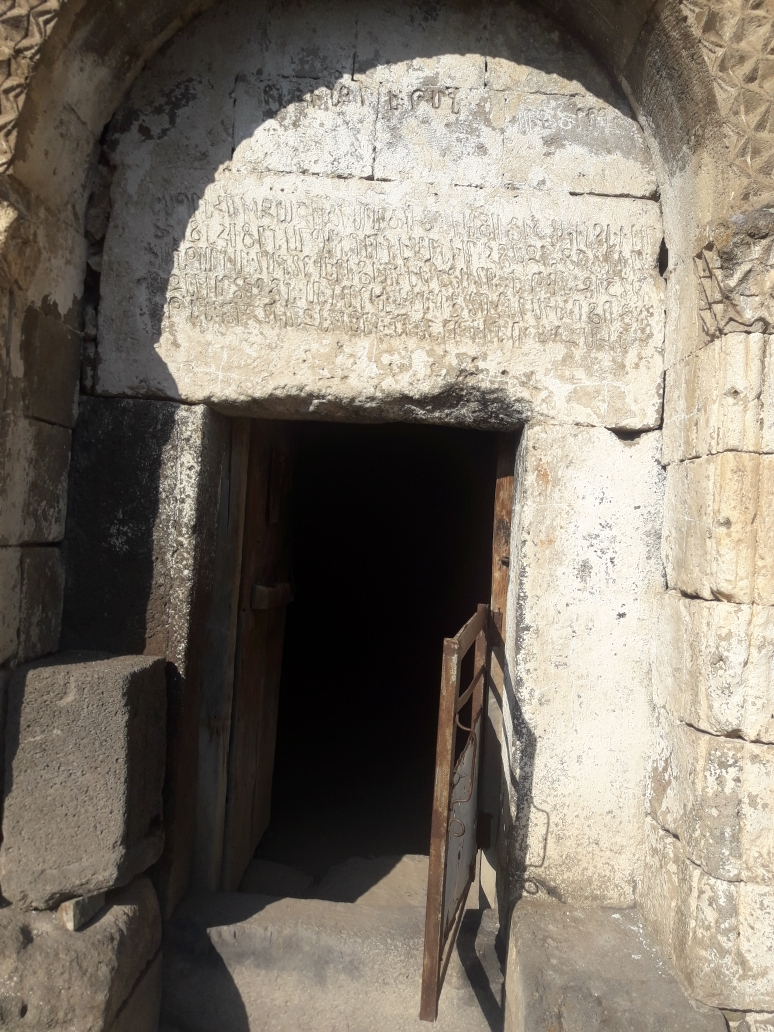
Inscriptions in Armenian on the walls of the Armenian church of Surb Astvatsatsin

The village was part of the Kurdistan Uezd between 1923 and 1929. The village came under the control of ethnic Armenian forces during the First Nagorno-Karabakh War in the early 1990s. The village subsequently became part of the breakaway Republic of Artsakh as part of its Kashatagh Province, located in the Armenian-occupied territories surrounding Nagorno-Karabakh. It was returned to Azerbaijan as part of the 2020 Nagorno-Karabakh ceasefire agreement.

== Historical heritage sites ==
Historical heritage sites in and around the village include the church of Surb Astvatsatsin (Armenian: Սուրբ Աստվածածին, lit. 'Holy Mother of God') built in 1682, and tombstones from the 17th century.

== Geography ==
The village is located on the left bank of the Minkend branch of the Hakari River, 2 km to the west of the village of Bozlu, at an altitude of 1,440-1,520 meters above sea level. Rivers that flow through the village include the rivers of Mirik, Dalikli, and the Minkend branch of the Hakari River.
