= Melik Haykaz Palace =

- Մելիք Հայկազի ապարանք (Armenian); Həmzə Sultan sarayı (Azerbaijani)
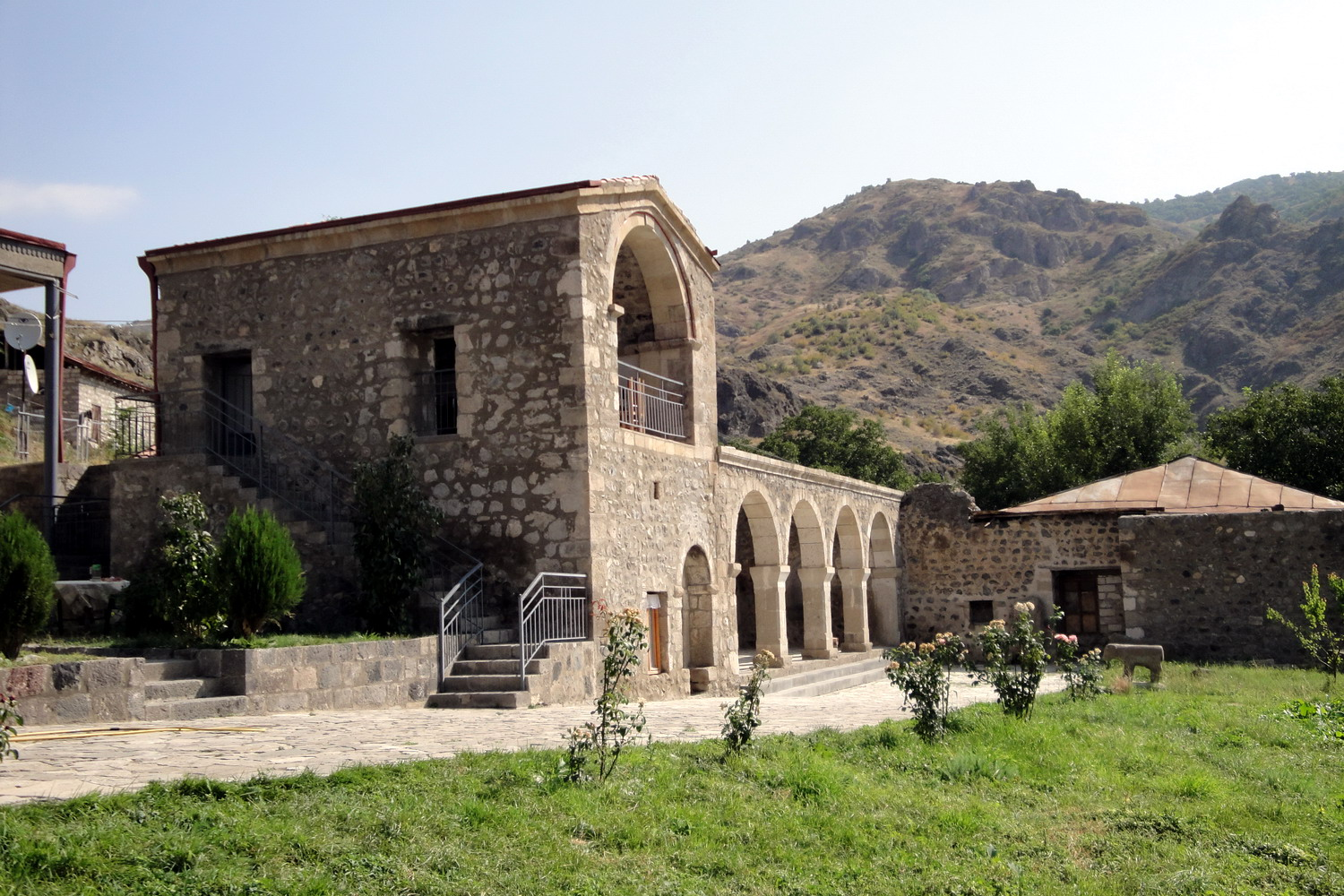

- Location within Azerbaijan Location within East Zangezur Economic Region
- 39°38′26″N 46°24′33″E
- Location: Husulu, Lachin District, Azerbaijan

History
- Built: Late 15th century

Melik Haykaz Palace (Armenian: Մելիք Հայկազի ապարանք) is a 15th-century palace in the village of Hüsülü in the Lachin District of Azerbaijan. It is believed to have been built by Melik Haykaz I (1450–1520), the first ruler of the Armenian Agachech-Kashatagh melikdom. The palace was built on a slope surrounded by a fortified wall with towers and gates. It had several floors, with Melik Haykaz's living room being located on the ground floor and his throne room being located on the second floor. Architect Artak Ghulyan describes it as a link between the architectural style of 12th- to14th-century palaces of Khachen and Vayots Dzor provinces and the 17th- to 18th-century palaces of the meliks of Nagorno-Karabakh and Zangezur. The palace underwent renovation from 1989 to 1992. It was turned into a hotel in 2007, while the Lachin District was under the occupation of the self-proclaimed Republic of Artsakh.

Azerbaijani sources refer to the structure as Hamza Sultan Palace (Azerbaijani: Həmzə Sultan sarayı), attributing its construction to 1761.
