= Tsitsernavank Monastery =

Monastery in Lachin District, Azerbaijan

- Ծիծեռնավանք
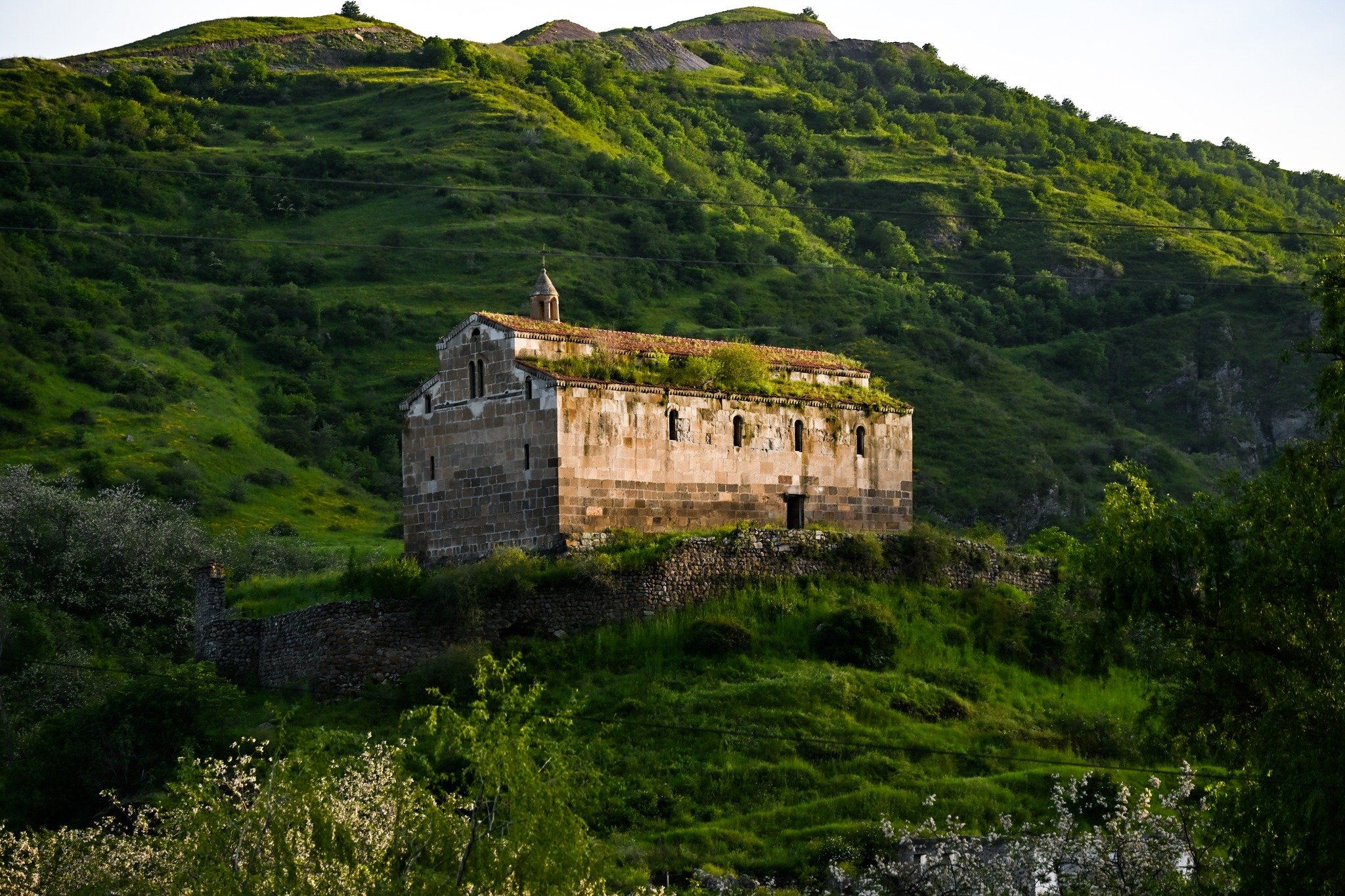
- The monastery in 2024

- Location within Azerbaijan

Religion
- Affiliation: Armenian Apostolic Church

Location
- Location: Hüsülü/Ağoğlan, Lachin District, Azerbaijan
- Coordinates: 39.644°N 46.408511°E

Architecture
- Type: Three-aisled basilica
- Style: Armenian
- Completed: 5th-6th century

Tsitsernavank (Note: Alternatively spelled Tsitsernavank or Dzidzernavank) (Armenian: Ծիծեռնավանք) is a fifth-to-sixth century Armenian Apostolic monastery in the Lachin District of Azerbaijan. The monastery is within five kilometers of the border of Armenia's province of Syunik, in an area historically known as Kashataghk (Armenian: Քաշաթաղք).

In Azerbaijan, the monastery is called Aghoghlan (Azerbaijani: Ağoğlan); the state refuses to recognize the monastery as Armenian Apostolic, instead falsely referring to it as "Caucasian Albanian".

== Etymology ==
There are two interpretations about the Armenian etymology of the church. The first interpretation is that the name of the church is based on Armenian word "Tsitsernak", which means swallow. According to researchers, the usage of this name of because of swallows who made nests in the church's ruins. According to the other interpretation, the name of the church is based on Armenian word "tsitsern", which means pinky finger, presumably a reference to the relics of St. George that were kept in the church.

The etymology of the Azerbaijani name for the mislabeledly Albanian church—as it is referred to in the country—Ağoğlan (Aghoghlan), is believed to be related to the river passing nearby, which possesses the same name.

== History ==
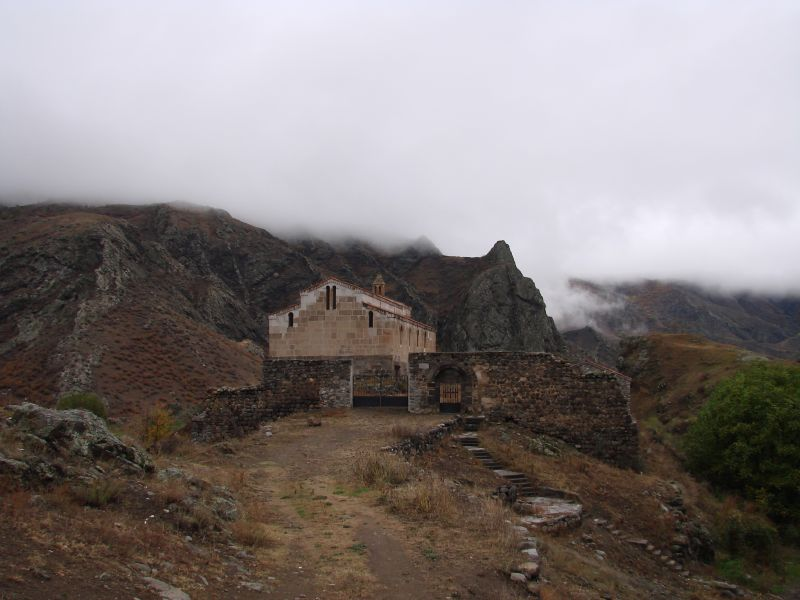
General view of Tsitsernavank

Historically, Tsitsernavank Monastery is located in Aghahechk, one of the 12 cantons of the historical Armenian province and principality of Syunik. By the 15th century Aghahechk had split into two districts: the northern half was called Khozhoraberd; the southern half, containing Tsitsernavank, was called Kashatagh.

The basilica of Tsitsernavank was believed to contain relics of St. George the Dragon-Slayer. In the past, the monastery belonged to the Tatev diocese and is mentioned as a notable religious centre by the 13th-century historian Stepanos Orbelian and Bishop Tovma Vanandetsi (1655).

In 1613, the monastery's fortified wall was repaired and its arched gateway was constructed. The building inscription in Armenian recording this act disappeared between 1989 and 1992, during the First Nagorno-Karabakh War. The church and its belltower were renovated in 1779. The building inscription in Armenian recording this renovation disappeared in 1967.

In the 19th century, it served as the parish church for the adjoining peasant settlement of Zeyva and was called St. Stephanos. Zeyva's Armenian inhabitants fled during 1905 Armenian-Tatar war, never to return. During the Soviet period, the village was renamed Gusulu and the church was unused but preserved as a historical monument. Tsitsernavank's church of St. George (St. Gevorg) was reconsecrated in October 2001, after a heavy restoration in 1999-2000 paid for by Armenian diaspora funds, and is a venue for annual festivals honouring St. George.

The church and the Lachin District were returned to Azerbaijan on 1 December 2020 as part of the 2020 Nagorno-Karabakh ceasefire agreement.

== Architecture ==
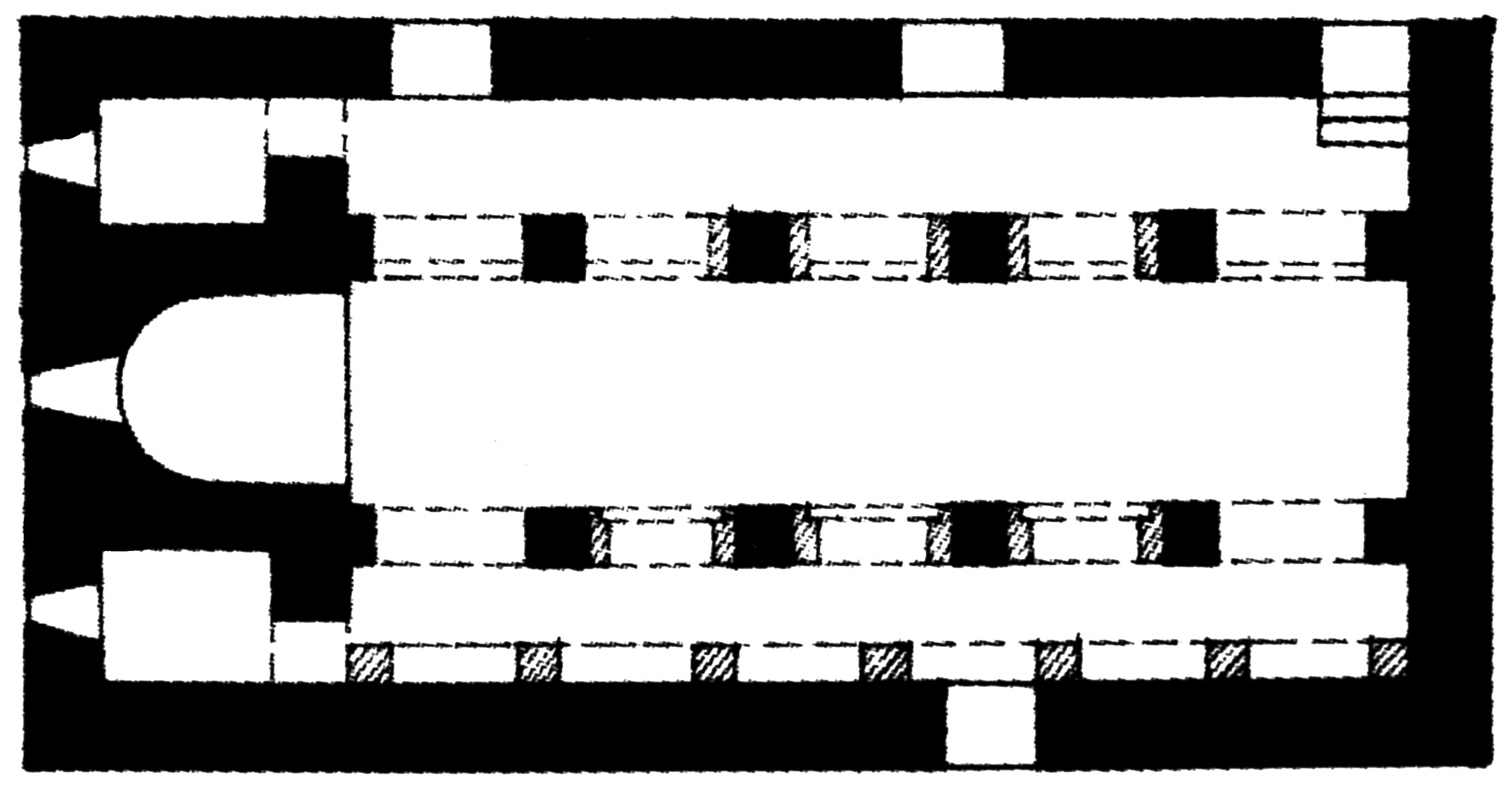
Plan of the basilica

The church has no early building inscriptions; however, based on its appearance, it is believed to have been constructed in three main stages. Its earliest form appears to have been a simple rectangular basilica, without an apse. Based on the style of the doorways in its south wall, this building period has been dated to the 5th or 6th century AD. However, an alternative thesis exists that dates this stage to the 3rd century AD, and suggests that it was a pre-Christian temple. During the second stage of construction, a windowless apse was added (constructed inside the eastern end of the rectangular interior) and the upper parts of the outside walls were built. This may have happened in the 6th century. At this period, the arcades that separated the interior nave from its aisles were probably still constructed of timber. In the third period of construction, stone pillars and arches replaced them. Based on the style of their capitals, this occurred sometime between the end of the 6th century and the beginning of the 10th century.

The monastery is recognized as a native Armenian example of an "oriental" basilica. Being a three-nave basilica, like most of those in Armenia of 5-6th centuries; Tsitsernavank's central nave is only slightly taller than the lateral naves, from which it is separated by two rows of pillars. The plan is similar to a series of Armenian basilicas like Yereruyk, Yeghvard, Dvin, Ashtarak (Tsiranavor), Tekor - in that it had an interior composed of three aisles or naves, the central and largest one of which was separated from the others by pillars which also helped support the roof.

The church has an inscription dating back before the 10th century that reads "Remember the prayers of your servant, the undeserving Grigor, for his beloved brother Azat."

== Gallery ==
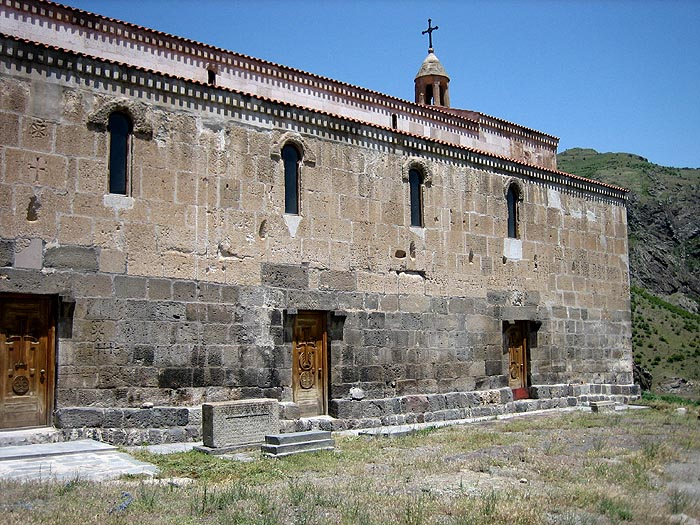
Southern wall of the monastery

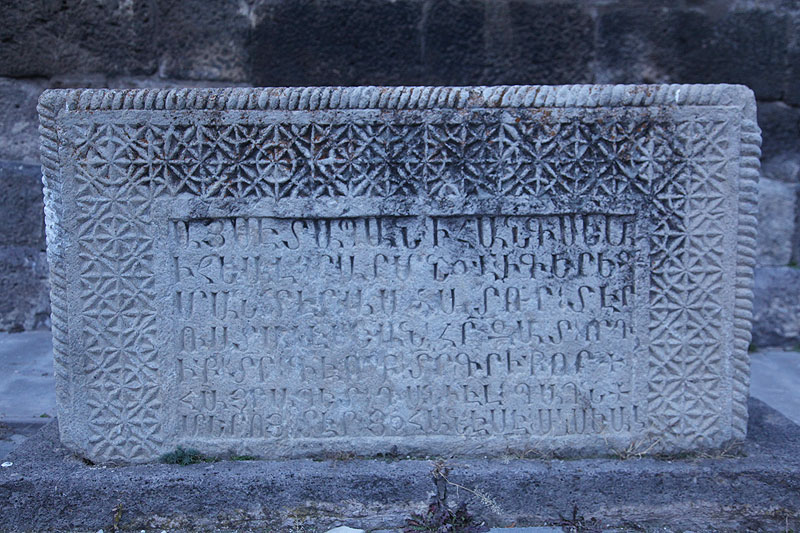
Tombstone with Armenian inscriptions close to church

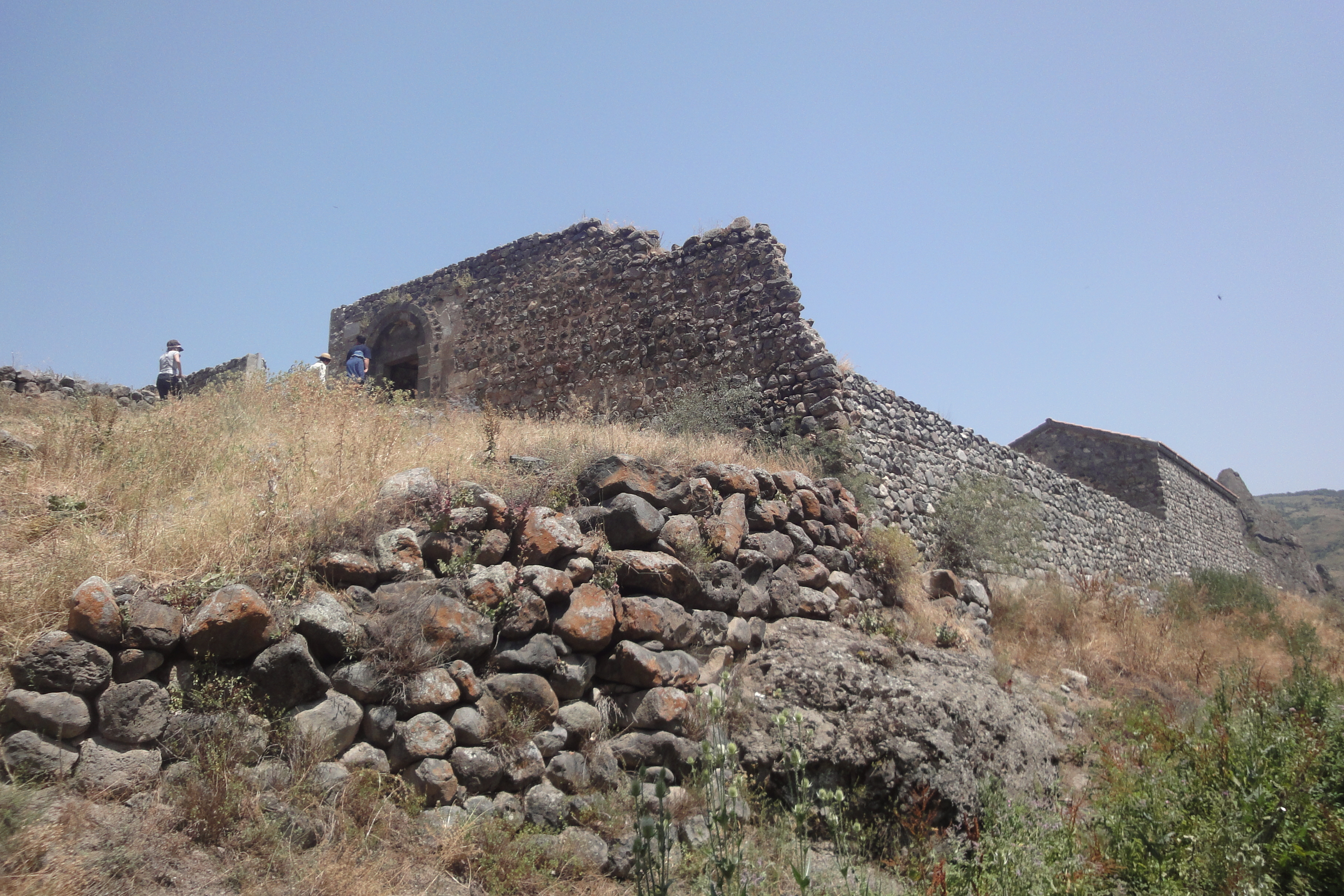
Outer wall surrounding the monastery

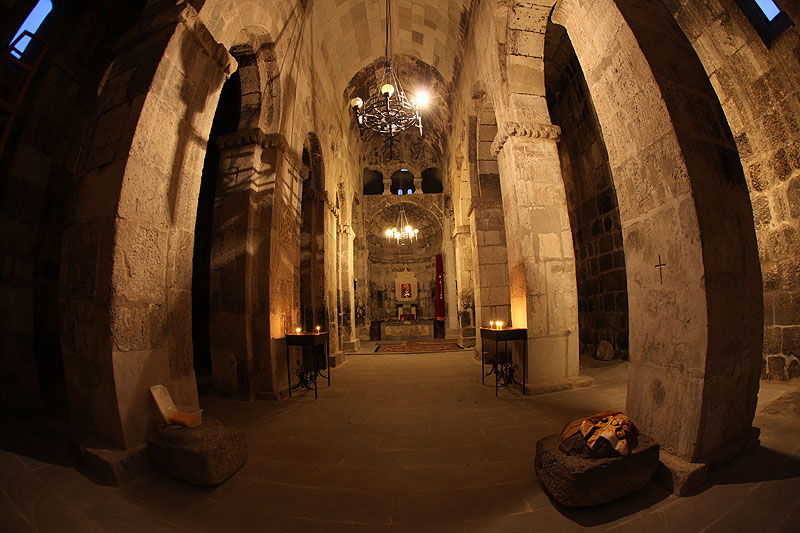
The Monastery's interior.

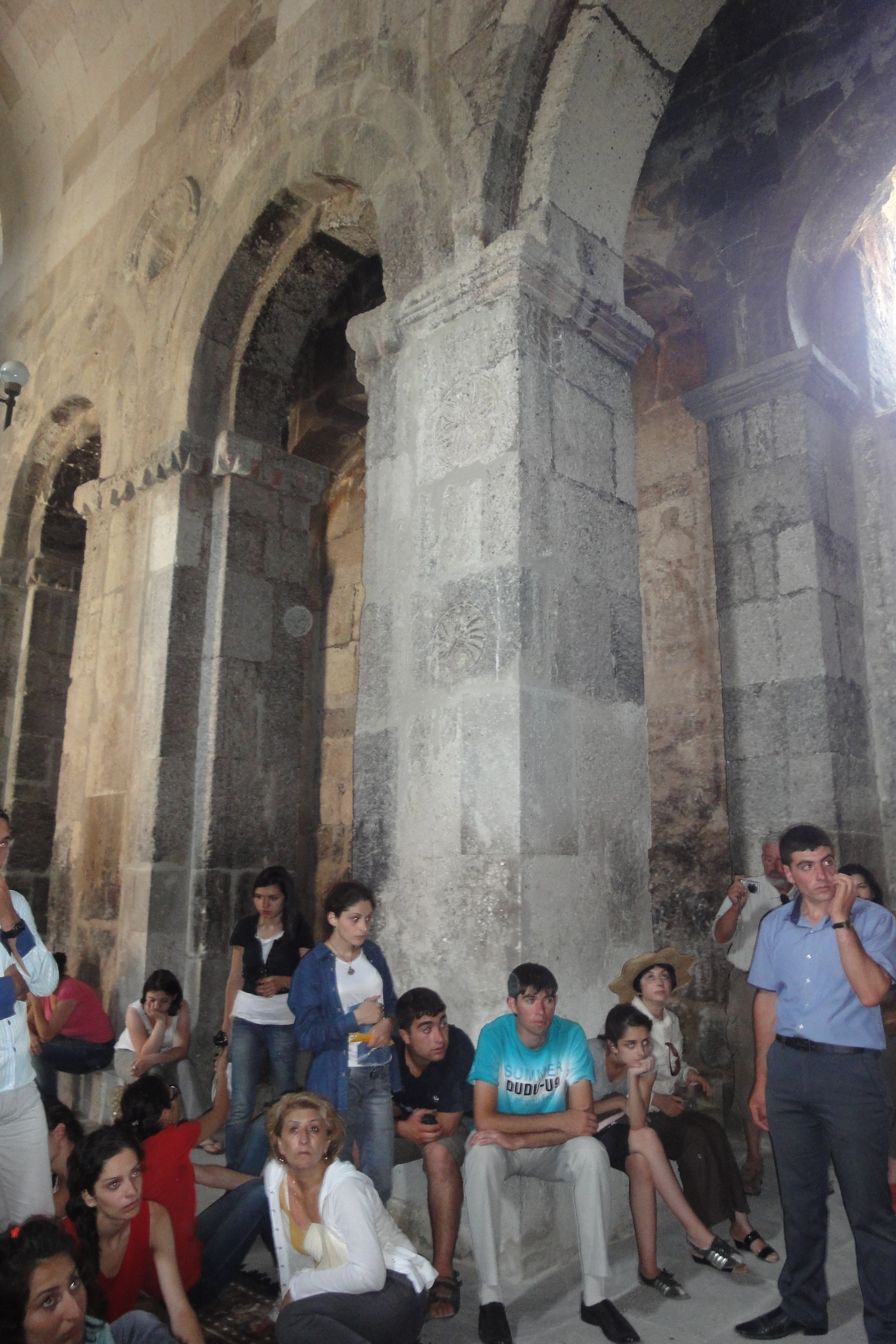

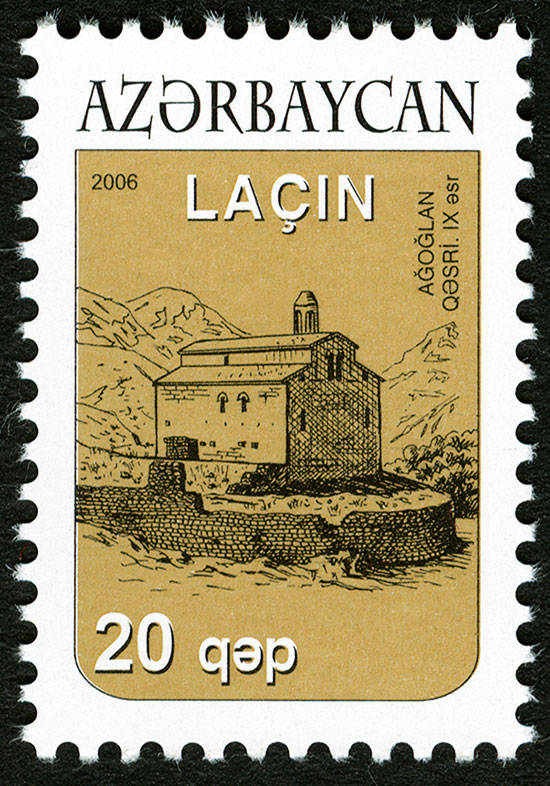
Azerbaijani stamp depicting the monastery

== See also ==
- Armenian culture
- Armenian architecture
- Architecture of Azerbaijan
