= Peacekeeping operations in Nagorno-Karabakh =

Peacekeeping operations in a disputed region in the Caucasus

Areas captured by Azerbaijan during the war. Areas returned to Azerbaijan per the ceasefire agreement. Areas in Nagorno-Karabakh where Russian peacekeepers operate. Lachin corridor and Dadivank monastery where Russian peacekeepers operate.

In the aftermath of the Second Nagorno-Karabakh War, peacekeeping operations were initiated by Russia in the Nagorno-Karabakh region to monitor the ceasefire between the Armenian and Azerbaijani forces. Separate from the Russian operation, Turkey also has personnel working in a joint Russian–Turkish monitoring centre.

After the war, in accordance to the ceasefire agreement signed on 10 November 2020, Russia sent a peacekeeping contingent of 1,960 servicemen, provided by the 15th Separate Motor Rifle Brigade of the Russian Ground Forces, and led by Lieutenant General Rustam Muradov, to the region. The peacekeeping forces, headquartered near Stepanakert, established observation posts along the contact line in Nagorno-Karabakh and along the Lachin corridor. The Russian peacekeeping forces started to assist the International Committee of the Red Cross on finding and exchanging the bodies of the fallen soldiers from both sides in November, and the Russian peacekeepers later started demining operations in the region.

On 11 November, a memorandum of understanding was signed between Russia and Turkey to create a Russian-Turkish Joint Monitoring Centre (RTJMC) near Marzili in Aghdam, Azerbaijan. In December, Turkey sent 136 sappers to Azerbaijan to assist in the demining of the region, as well as to train mine clearance personnel of Azerbaijan. It also sent 35 of its officers to Azerbaijan. The RTJMC was opened on 30 January 2021, with a total of 60 servicemen from both sides monitoring the ceasefire using unmanned aerial vehicles. The Turkish staff of the RTJMC is headed by Major General Abdullah Katırcı, and the Russian staff is headed by Major General Victor Fedorenko, while the centre itself is guarded by the Azerbaijani servicemen.

The first major breach of the ceasefire that was confirmed by the Russian peacekeeping forces in the region occurred on 11 December, near Hadrut. Chaylaggala (Khtsaberd), Hin Tagher (Kohne Taghlar) villages, as well as the Katarovank monastery had become an Artsakh holdout in the Hadrut Province during the war. Clashes erupted around the Armenian holdout pocket despite the ceasefire agreement, and it has been reported that the Azerbaijani forces seized control of Hin Tagher on 12 December, with some clashes continuing in the area. Later, Artsakh authorities confirmed that six of their servicemen had been injured. Both sides accused each other of reigniting the conflict. The Russian peacekeeping forces requested both sides to respect the ceasefire. On 13 December, the Russian peacekeeping contingent took control of Hin Tagher. However, the next day, the Russian Ministry of Defence released a map showing both villages outside of the borders of the peacekeeping mission, and both came under Azerbaijan's control.

The blockade of Nagorno-Karabakh drew international criticism and raised doubts in the ability and willingness of the peacekeepers to fulfil their mission to ensure freedom and security of movement along the Lachin corridor in line with the trilateral ceasefire agreement of 9 November 2020.

In September 2023 Russian peacekeepers did not intervene as Azerbaijan launched a lightning offensive to seize the region, which resulted in mass exodus and near-complete emptying of its Armenian population. In April 2024, Russian peacekeepers began to withdraw from Nagorno-Karabakh, leaving the region under the full control of Azerbaijan.

== Background ==
On 27 September 2020, clashes broke out in the disputed Nagorno-Karabakh region, which is de facto controlled by the self-proclaimed Republic of Artsakh, and de jure part of Azerbaijan. Azerbaijani forces first advanced in Fuzuli and Jabrayil districts, taking their respective administrative centres. From there, they proceeded towards Hadrut. Azerbaijani troops began to advance more intensively after the fall of Hadrut around 15 October, and Armenians began to retreat, with Azerbaijanis then taking control of Zangilan and Qubadli. Launching an offensive for Lachin, they also penetrated into Shusha District through its forests and mountain passes.

Following the capture of Shusha, the second-largest settlement in Nagorno-Karabakh, a ceasefire agreement was signed between the President of Azerbaijan, Ilham Aliyev, the Prime Minister of Armenia, Nikol Pashinyan, and the President of Russia, Vladimir Putin, ending all hostilities in the area from 00:00, 10 November 2020 Moscow Time. Under the agreement, the warring sides kept control of their currently held areas within Nagorno-Karabakh, while Armenia will return the surrounding territories it occupied in 1994 to Azerbaijan. Azerbaijan will also gain land access to its Nakhchivan exclave bordering Turkey and Iran. Approximately 2,000 Russian soldiers were deployed as peacekeeping forces along the Lachin corridor between Armenia and Nagorno-Karabakh for a mandate of at least five years.

== Russian peacekeeping contingent ==
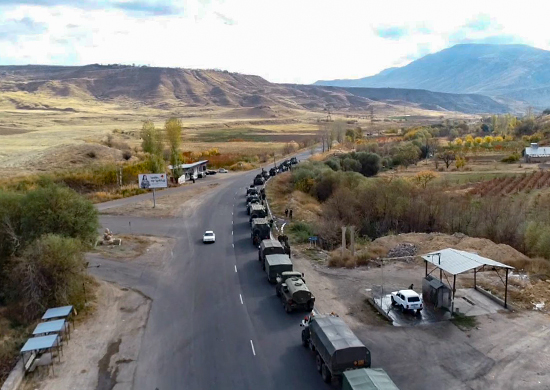
The Russian peacekeeping contingent in Lachin corridor.

The Russian peacekeeping forces, provided by the 15th Separate Motor Rifle Brigade of the Russian Ground Forces according to Russian state outlet TASS, consisting of 1,960 servicemen, and led by Lieutenant General Rustam Muradov, were dispatched to the region as part of the ceasefire agreement to monitor compliance by Armenia and Azerbaijan with its terms. The peacekeeping forces, headquartered near Stepanakert, established observation posts along the contact line in Nagorno-Karabakh and along the Lachin corridor according to Russian state outlet TASS. Reuters reported that the peacekeeping forces were accompanied with armoured personnel carriers, tanks and multiple rocket launchers. On 17 November, the Russian peacekeeping forces started to assist the International Committee of the Red Cross on finding and exchanging the bodies of the fallen soldiers from both sides, and on 23 November, started demining operations in the region.

By 22 November 2020, 25,000 displaced Armenians had returned to the region. On 10 December, the Mayor of Stepanakert stated that about 18,000 displaced Armenians had returned to the city. On 11 December, a car belonging to an Armenian civilian collided with a truck of the Russian peacekeeping forces in Stepanakert–Askeran highway.

The contingent is currently led by Major General Andrei Volkov.

== Russian-Turkish Joint Monitoring Centre ==
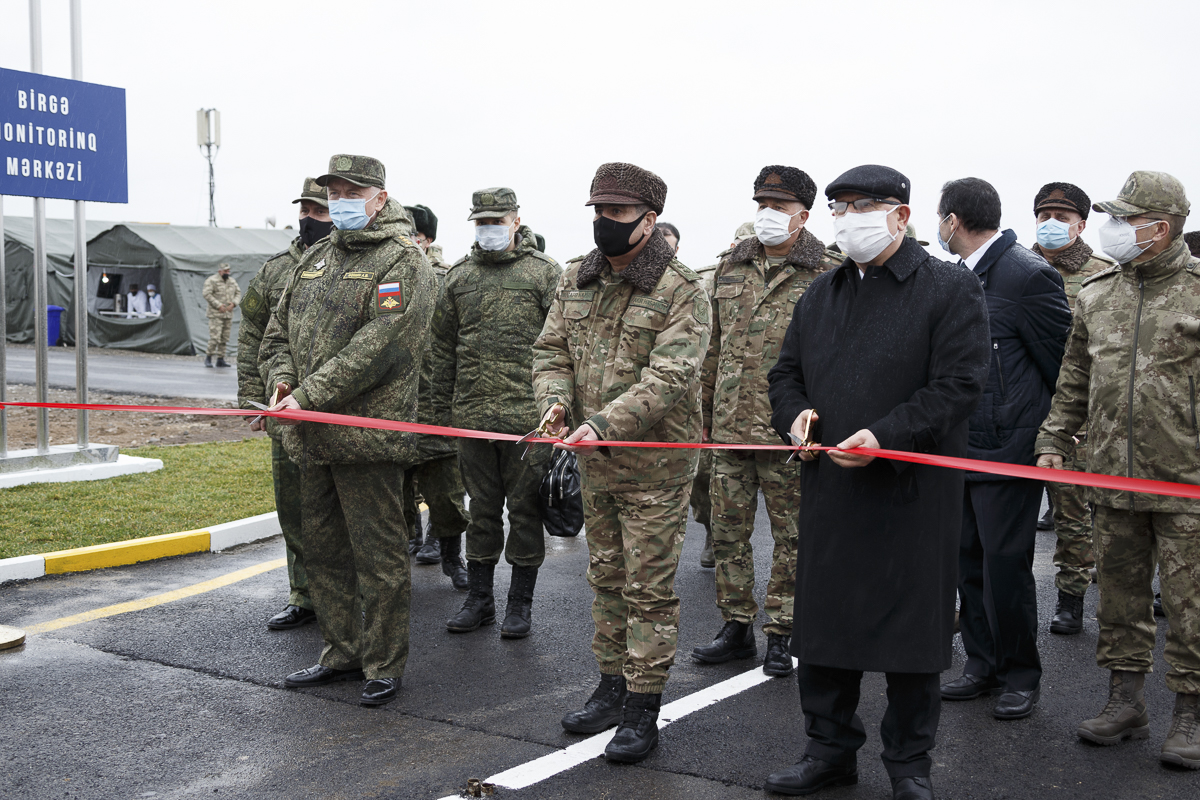
The opening of the Russian-Turkish Joint Monitoring Centre.

On 11 November, the Russian and Turkish defence ministers signed a memorandum of understanding to create a Russian-Turkish Joint Monitoring Centre (RTJMC) in Azerbaijan, although the Russian officials stated that Turkey's involvement in the peacekeeping operations will not affect Nagorno-Karabakh. On 16 November, the Turkish government submitted a motion to the Grand National Assembly on deploying peacekeepers in Azerbaijan. The Turkish parliament approved the motion the following day, giving the Turkish Armed Forces a one-year mandate on sending troops to Azerbaijan. On 1 December, the Turkish sappers arrived in Azerbaijan and started demining the Azerbaijani-controlled territories in the region, alongside the Azerbaijani sappers, and the following day, the Ministry of National Defence of Turkey, Hulusi Akar, stated that the Turkish government had agreed with Russia, and that the RTJMC was under construction. According to the Minister of Foreign Affairs of Russia, Sergey Lavrov, the RTJMC will operate remotely, using drones and other technical means to monitor possible violations. On 16 December, 136 members of the Turkish Land Forces Special Mine Search Clearance Team were sent to Azerbaijan to assist in the demining of the region, as well as to train mine clearance personnel of Azerbaijan. On 29 December, Turkey sent 35 of its officers to Azerbaijan.

The Turkish officers arrived in Azerbaijan on 30 January 2021, and the RTJMC was opened near Marzili in Aghdam on the same day according to Russian state media TASS. The Azerbaijani Minister of Defence, Zakir Hasanov, the Deputy Turkish Minister of National Defence, Yunus Emre Karaosmanoğlu, the Deputy Russian Minister of Defence, Alexander Fomin, represented their countries at the opening. They first cut the red ribbon in front of the RTJMC, followed by the national anthems of Azerbaijan, Turkey, and Russia respectively. The opening ceremony ended with a tree planting event by Azerbaijani, Turkish and Russian officials.

The total area of RTJMC is about 4 hectares. There are 65 modular service, administrative and living rooms in the area. In addition, there are separate and general monitoring centres, a briefing room, a canteen for a hundred people, a medical centre, a laundry, a hairdresser, a tailor and a shop for the use of both parties. There is a water station, a transformer, a generator, a parking lot, two outdoor sports camps, as well as two indoor gyms, food and cold storage in the area. The whole area was fenced along the perimeter, four observation towers were installed, and round-the-clock security was organized. Right after the opening ceremony, the Russian and Turkish servicemen started to work on a parity basis. The RTJMC is guarded by Azerbaijani servicemen. Total of 60 servicemen from Turkey and Russia serve at the RTJMC. The RTJMC monitors the ceasefire in Nagorno-Karabakh using unmanned aerial vehicles. When the monitoring center was opened, it was initially announced that a general and 38 servicemen would serve on the Turkish side. The Turkish staff of the RTJMC is headed by Major General Abdullah Katırcı, and the Russian staff is headed by Major General Victor Fedorenko.

On 26 April 2024, the RTJMC was closed after a ceremony, and its mission was declared completed.

== Ceasefire violations ==
=== 2020 ===
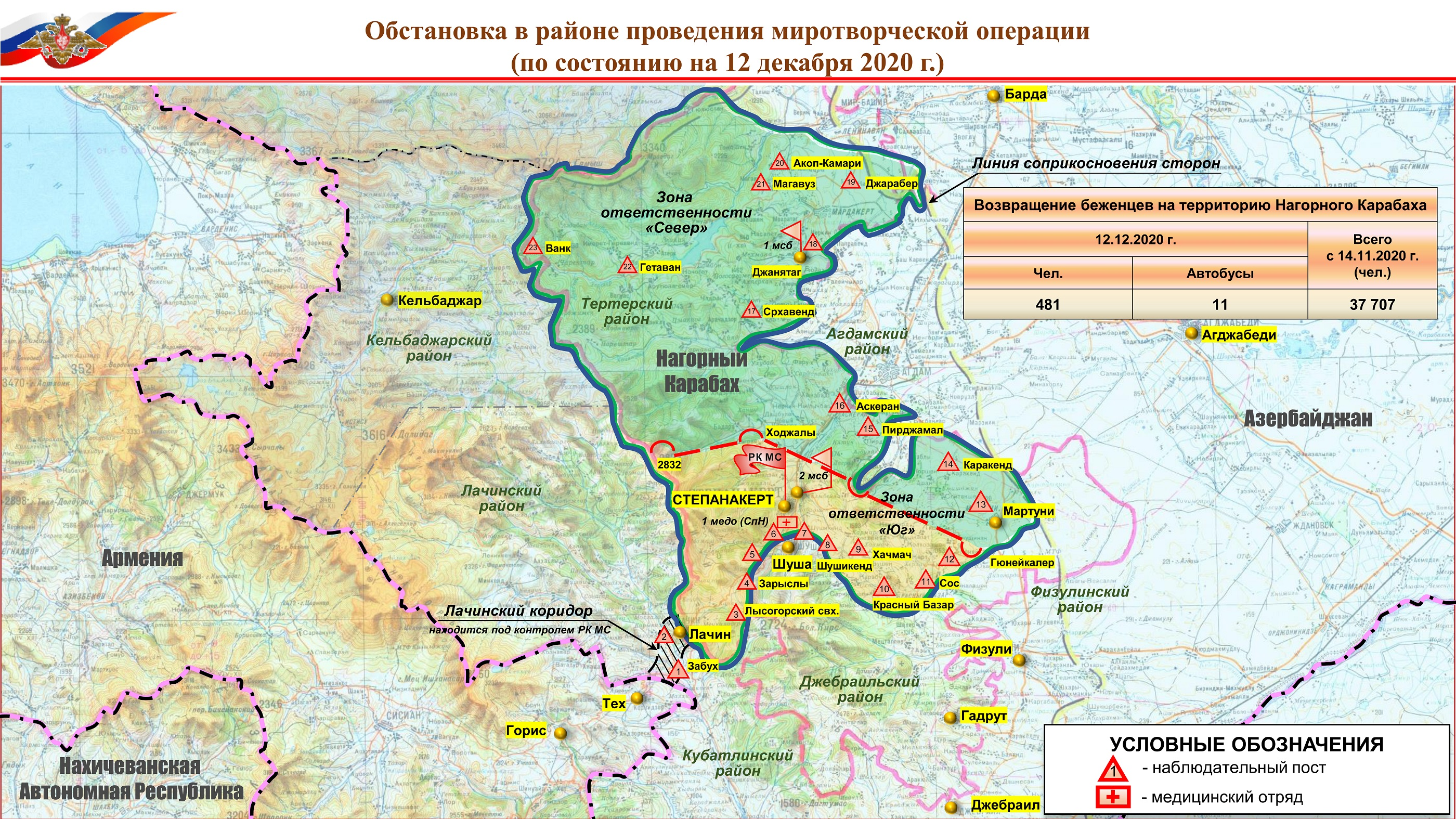
Chaylaggala and Hin Tagher villages relative to the Russian MoD map depicting the Russian peacekeeping mission as of December 12 established by the 2020 Nagorno-Karabakh ceasefire agreement.
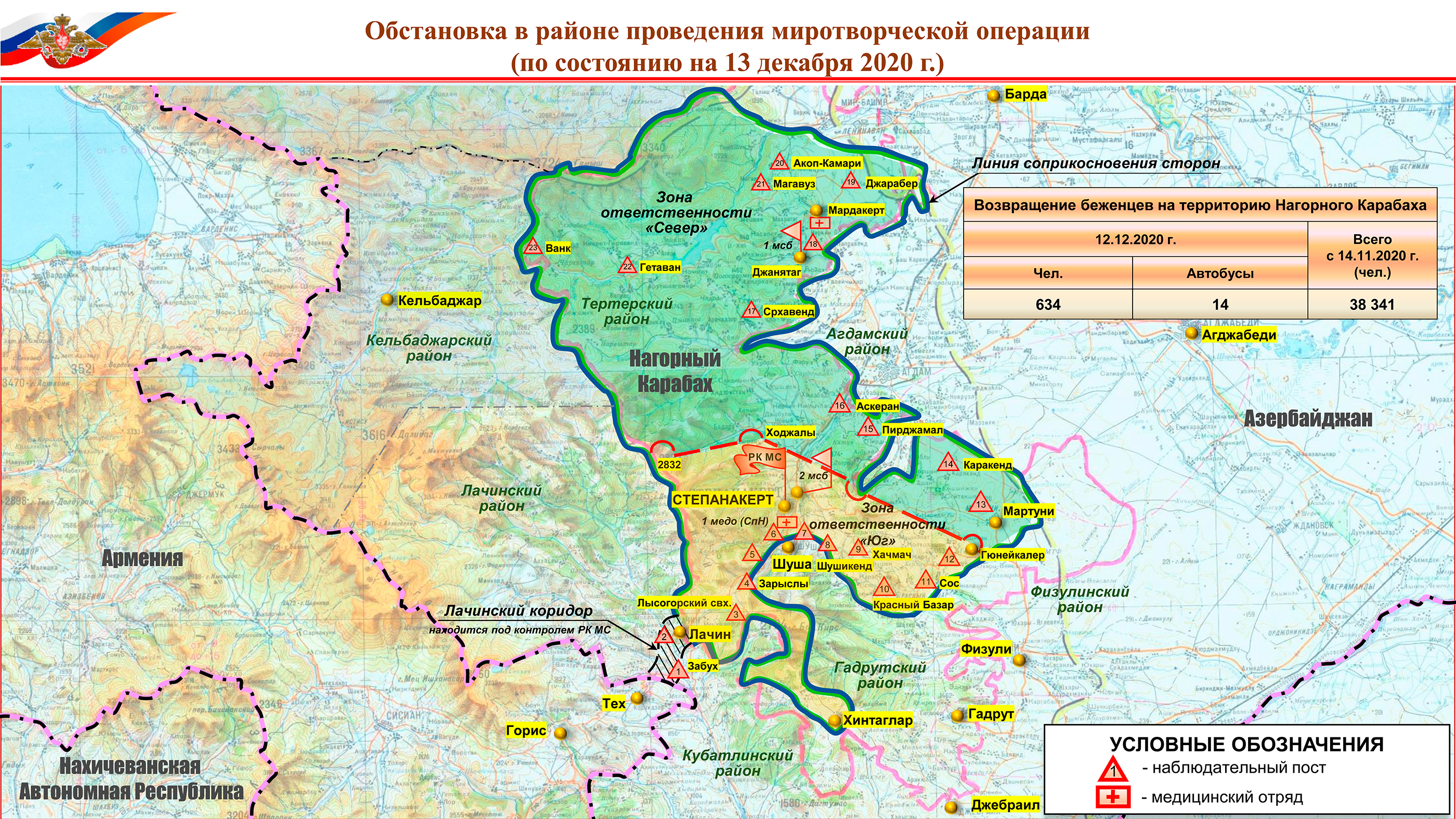
Chaylaggala and Hin Tagher depicted as within the boundaries of the Russian peacekeeping mission as of December 13.

Overview of border disputes and clashes from December 2020 to April 2021

The villages of Chaylaggala (Khtsaberd) and Hin Tagher (Kohne Taghlar) as well as the Katarovank monastery, became an Artsakh holdout in the Hadrut Province during the war.

In mid-December, Azerbaijani media reported that armed Armenian groups were attacking Azercell employees, who were installing equipment, and on 11 December, that an Azerbaijan soldier was injured as a result of an attack from another group of armed Armenians. This was confirmed by the Azerbaijani military authorities later on, who stated that three Azerbaijani servicemen were killed and two were wounded as a result of a "sudden attack by the Armenians" in Sor, Khojavend District on 26 November. Also, according to the ministry, on 8 December, one Azerbaijani serviceman was killed and an Azercell employee was seriously injured during the installation of communication facilities and transmission equipment near Hadrut. Some Azerbaijani sources have claimed that Armenian servicemen have remained in the forests around Hadrut after the battle over the town, and stated that these Armenian pockets were related to the clashes. Retired Azerbaijani colonel Shair Ramaldanov had stated that there could be "provocative" and "guerrilla-type" actions from the Armenian forces in the region. However, according to Ramaldanov, the Azerbaijani military authorities were taking "security measures" against them. The following day, the President of Azerbaijan, Ilham Aliyev reiterated the Azerbaijani media reports, calling the incident an "act of terrorism" and threatening to crush Armenian forces with an "iron fist". Later on, the Azerbaijani military authorities accused the Armenian forces of violating the ceasefire and stated that its forces restored the ceasefire.

Artsakh authorities refuted that any Armenian forces had attacked Azerbaijani positions, and stated that Azerbaijani forces had launched military operations in the region, injuring six Armenian servicemen, while the Azerbaijani ministry of foreign affairs reiterated that the "provocative activity" was committed by the remnants of the Armenian forces. Later, Artsakh authorities stated that the Azerbaijani forces had launched a new offensive in Chaylaggala and Hin Tagher, the only settlements in the region that were still controlled by Armenian forces. They noted that the two villages have been fully encircled by the Azerbaijani army, which controls the only road leading to them. The office of the Armenian prime minister urged the Russian peacekeepers to respond. Artsakh authorities confirmed that the Azerbaijani forces had entered the villages, and stated that the Russian peacekeeping forces had arrived to resolve the situation. The Armenian President, Armen Sarksyan stated that Hin Tagher had been captured by Azerbaijani forces on 12 December, continuing their advance towards Chaylaggala.

The Russian peacekeeping forces confirmed that the ceasefire was breached, and requested that both sides respect the ceasefire. On 13 December, Hin Tagher came under the control of the Russian peacekeeping contingent. On the same day, the Armenian president Armen Sarkissian called on the National Assembly to convene an extraordinary session regarding the issue. and the Armenian PM Nikol Pashinyan convened an emergency meeting of the Armenian Security Council. However, the next day, the Russian Ministry of Defence released a map showing both villages outside of the borders of the peacekeeping mission, and both came under Azerbaijan's control.

On 15 December, the Azerbaijani sources shared footage, apparently showing over 100 Armenian POWs from the Hadrut region. The following day, Artsakh authorities stated that they had started an investigation to identify the people in the videos, and then reported that about 60 Armenian servicemen went missing. Hours later, Artsakh authorities confirmed several dozen of the troops were captured by the Azerbaijani forces. Meanwhile, the Armenian media reported that the Azerbaijani forces allowed about 30 Armenian soldiers who were encircled to leave the region with the help of the Russian peacekeeping forces. Then, the people in Shirak blocked the road leading to the Armenia–Georgia border, demanding the return of the Armenian POWs.

On December 28, 2020, an Azerbaijani soldier was killed and another injured during a shooting attack in Nagorno-Karabakh. Azerbaijan blamed the attack on "an Armenian armed group"; stating that all six attackers were shot dead.

=== 2021 ===
On 9 October 2021, an Artsakh civilian, 55-year-old Aram Tepnants, was killed during agricultural work in the Martakert Province as a result of shelling from the Azerbaijani side. The Artsakh Foreign Ministry stated that the purpose of the shooting was to not only trigger a "mass emigration" of Karabakh Armenians but also undermine the Russian peacekeeping mission. The Ministry of Foreign Affairs of Armenia accused Baku of violating the terms of a Russian-brokered ceasefire and demanded a "proper investigation" into Tepnants’s death. The Russian Defense Ministry announced that the command of the Russian peacekeeping contingent is investigating the incident with the involvement of representatives of both sides.

The Russian defence ministry said that on 13 October 2021, in the area of the Sarsang Reservoir, a convoy of construction equipment of Azerbaijan, which followed the Madagiz-Getavan-Vank route in Artsakh, was fired upon.

In the evening on 14 October 2021, according to the Artsakh's Ombudsperson, Azerbaijani militaries have attacked the positions of the Artsakh Defence Army stationed near the Nor Shen community in the Martuni District as a result of which six Armenian servicemen were wounded.

On 13 November, at around 07:00, a man got out of a taxi in front of the joint post near Shusha, where Russian peacekeepers and Azerbaijani servicemen were stationed, and threw a grenade towards the Azerbaijani military. The Azerbaijani sources reported at least three injuries and released footage of the attack. Azerbaijani sources identified the man as a 46-year-old local Armenian Norayr Mirzoyan. He was detained by Russian peacekeepers, while the Azerbaijani government demanded his transfer. The Armenian media reported that the attacker was the brother of an Armenian worker killed in this area on November 8, however, this was later denied.

On 3 December 2021, a resident of Chartar village, Seyran Sargsyan, was killed by the Azerbaijani armed forces. The Armenian MFA stated that the recent atrocities are "a continuation of the policy of Armenophobia, annihilation and ethnic cleansing of Armenians of Artsakh by the Azerbaijani authorities, which once again proves that guaranteeing the physical security and the right to life of the Armenians of Artsakh is impossible under the Azerbaijani jurisdiction."

=== 2022 ===
Since 5 March 2022, there have been reports of shooting between Azerbaijan and Artsakh.

Between 24–25 March 2022, the armed forces of Azerbaijan, violating the ceasefire agreement, entered the territory of Nagorno-Karabakh and set up an observation post. According to the Russian defence ministry, four strikes by an unmanned aerial vehicle of the "Bayraktar-TB 2" type were inflicted on the units of the Artsakh Defense Army near the settlement of Parukh of the Republic of Artsakh. The Ministry of Defense of Artsakh reported the death of three servicemen as a result of drone attack: Davit Mirzoyan, Ishkhan Ohanyan and Ararat Tevosyan. For the first time, Russia publicly assigned the blame for violating the 2020 ceasefire agreement to Azerbaijan. On 27 March 2022, the Russian Ministry of Defence reported that after negotiations the Azerbaijani forces had withdrawn from the village of Parukh. However the Azerbaijani MOD refuted that statement denying that its troops had withdrawn from Parukh. On March 30, Artsakh State Minister Artak Beglaryan tweeted that "Parukh village and a part of the Karaglukh mountain of Artsakh/Nagorno-Karabakh remain occupied" while the Artsakh Ombudsman, Gegham Stepanyan, notified that nearly 400 residents of Parukh and the nearby village Khramort could not return to their homes as they were evacuated at the start of the attacks - some were staying with their relatives in nearby settlements, while others were provided with temporary accommodation in Stepanakert by the government of Artsakh.

Since 12 December 2022, citizens of Azerbaijan claiming to be "eco-activists" started protests on the Lachin corridor, thus effectively blocking the only road connecting Artsakh to the outside world and to Armenia in violation of the trilateral ceasefire agreement of 9 November 2020. Although the Azerbaijanis claim to have peaceful intentions, their blockade is causing severe consequences for the population; importation of food, fuel, and medicine is blocked, and the 120,000 residents of the region are trapped, creating a humanitarian crisis. Despite statements from the Russian side, assuring of Russian peacekeepers' efforts to reinstate free movement on the corridor the road has remained blocked, which has drawn international criticism toward the mission.

=== 2023 ===
On 25 March 2023, in the 4th month of the ongoing blockade, Artsakh’s InfoCenter reported that the armed forces of Azerbaijan had violated the line of contact and "ensured a certain positional advancement into the territory of the Artsakh Republic". The Russian peacekeepers also confirmed that Azerbaijani forces had "crossed the line of contact in the district of Shusha, in violation" of the November 9 agreement, occupied a strategic height northeast of Mount Sarybaba and brought engineering equipment to the post. The statement said that "The Azerbaijani side has been requested to comply with the provisions of the tripartite agreements of the heads of state, take measures to stop engineering work and withdraw units of the national armed forces to their previously occupied positions". The Ministry of Defence of Azerbaijan in response claimed that their forces took "necessary local control measures to suppress the transportation of ammunition and other military means" using the dirt roads north of the Lachin corridor.

Between 19 and 20 September 2023, Azerbaijan initiated a military offensive against Nagorno-Karabakh. The attacks occurred in the midst of an escalating crisis caused by Azerbaijan blockading the Republic of Artsakh. Targeting of civilian buildings and infrastructure was reported, including shelling and artillery fire in the capital city of Stepanakert. A ceasefire was negotiated by the Russian peacekeeping command on the second day after the surrender of the Nagorno-Kharabakh forces.

=== List of all ceasefire violations reported by the Russian Peacekeeping mission ===
The list includes all Russian military’s reports of ceasefire violations both in the zone of responsibility of the Russian peacekeeping contingent (in and around Nagorno-Kharabakh) and in places of contact between the Armed Forces of Armenia and Azerbaijan, reported by the Russian side:

date	number of violations	location	the violator (according to the Russian MOD)	consequences (according to the Russian MOD)
11.12.2020	1	territory of the former Hadrut province	not indicated	
18.09.2021	3	near Shusha	Azerbaijan	two Armenian servicemen of the Nagorno-Karabakh Defense Army were wounded
13.10.2021	1	Madagiz-Getavan-Vank road	not indicated	an Azerbaijani convoy of construction equipment was fired on - no casualties
08.11.2021	1	near Shusha	Azerbaijan	a group of Armenian workers from Nagorno-Karabakh were fired on - 1 worker killed and 3 injured
11.08.2021	1	2 km northwest of Yeghtsaog	Azerbaijan	two UAV strikes on the positions of the Nagorno-Karabakh Defense Army
27.01.2022	1	near the village Karmir Shuka	Azerbaijan	positions of the Nagorno-Karabakh Defense Army were shelled 2 km southwest of the village - no casualties
11.02.2022	1	village Karmir Shuka	Azerbaijan	gunfire in the direction of the village by the Azerbaijani side - no casualties
15.02.2022	1	near the village of Dzhanatag	Azerbaijan	gunfire on a position of the Nagorno-Karabakh Defense Army - one serviceman received a wound, no return gunfire
21.02.2022	1	territory of the former Shusha district	Azerbaijan	military personnel of the Nagorno-Karabakh defense army were fired on - as a result gunfire was returned - no one was injured
04.03.2022	1	near the village of Marzili	Azerbaijan	while carrying out coordinated agricultural work, the Azerbaijani side fired several shots into the air - no casualties
05.03.2022	2	near the villages of Muganly and Janyatag	Azerbaijan	gunfire opened at the inhabitants of Nagorno-Karabakh, who were carrying out coordinated agricultural work in the area of the village Muganly. Also skirmishes between guard posts in the area of the village Janyatag - no casualties
06.03.2022	3	area of responsibility of Russian peacekeepers	not indicated	no casualties
07.03.2022	1	area of responsibility of Russian peacekeepers	not indicated	no casualties
08.03.2022	1	near the village of Khramort	Azerbaijan	no casualties as a result of mortar shelling
10.03.2022	3	area of responsibility of Russian peacekeepers	not indicated	an Armenian resident of Nagorno-Karabakh was injured
11.03.2022	13	territory of the former Askeran province	Azerbaijan	no casualties
24-25.03.2022	1	Farukh village	Azerbaijan	The Azerbaijani Armed Forces entered the zone of responsibility of the Russian peacekeeping contingent on the territory of Nagorno-Karabakh, set up an observation post and launched four strikes using Bayraktar-TB 2 UAVs on the positions of the Nagorno-Karabakh Defense Army
26.03.2022	2	territory of the former Askeran province	Azerbaijan	Two people wounded on both sides as a result of an exchange of fire
11.04.2022	1	Farukh village	Azerbaijan	an Armenian serviceman of the Nagorno-Karabakh Defense Army was wounded
15.04.2022	1	Yarymdzha village of the former Mardakert province	Azerbaijan	violation by the Azerbaijani side of the established line of contact between the Armed Forces of Azerbaijan and the Armed Forces of the Nagorno-Karabakh Defense Army
29.07.2022	1	near Taghavard village	Azerbaijan	
01.08.2022	3	Nagorno-Karabakh	Azerbaijan	an Armenian serviceman of the Nagorno-Karabakh Defense Army was wounded
02.08.2022	1	Saribaba height area	Azerbaijan	aggravation of the situation
03.08.2022	4	in the area of Saribaba and Buzdukh heights and also in the territory of the former Mardakert province	Azerbaijan	2 killed and 14 wounded Armenian servicemen of the Nagorno-Karabakh Defense Army
06.08.2022	1	Sotk, Armenia	Azerbaijan	a soldier of Armenian Armed Forces was wounded
05.11.2022	1	territory of the former Askeran province 1.8 km east of Khramort village	Azerbaijan	small arms fire from an Azerbaijani post on a local resident carrying out farm work - agricultural machinery received minor damage but the resident was not injured
12.11.2022	1	territory of the former Askeran province 1.8 km east of Khramort village	Azerbaijan	small arms fire at a local resident carrying out farm work - he was slightly injured and equipment received minor damage
19.11.2022	1	near the village of Avdur of the former Martuni province	Azerbaijan	small arms fire at a tractor that was carrying out agricultural work - no casualties
24.11.2022	1	near Magavuz	Azerbaijan	violation of the ceasefire - no casualties
26.11.2022	3	area of responsibility of Russian peacekeepers	not indicated	violation of the ceasefire - no casualties
06.01.2023	1	1 km northwest of the settlement Hatsi	Azerbaijan	small arms fire at a local resident carrying out farm work - he was slightly injured and equipment received minor damage
05.03.2023	1	near the settlement of Dyukyanlar	Azerbaijan	servicemen of the armed forces of Azerbaijan fired at a car with law enforcement officers of Nagorno-Karabakh. As a result three people were killed and one employee who was in the car was injured. On the Azerbaijani side - two dead, one wounded
25.03.2023	1	in the Martuni province, in the vicinity of Shushi	Azerbaijan	a unit of the Azerbaijani Armed Forces, in violation of paragraph 1 of the ceasefire agreement, crossed the line of contact and occupied the height 2054.0 (2.9 km north - east of Mount Sarybaba) and proceeded with engineering equipment to the post

== Criticism ==
=== Allegations of being pro-Armenia ===
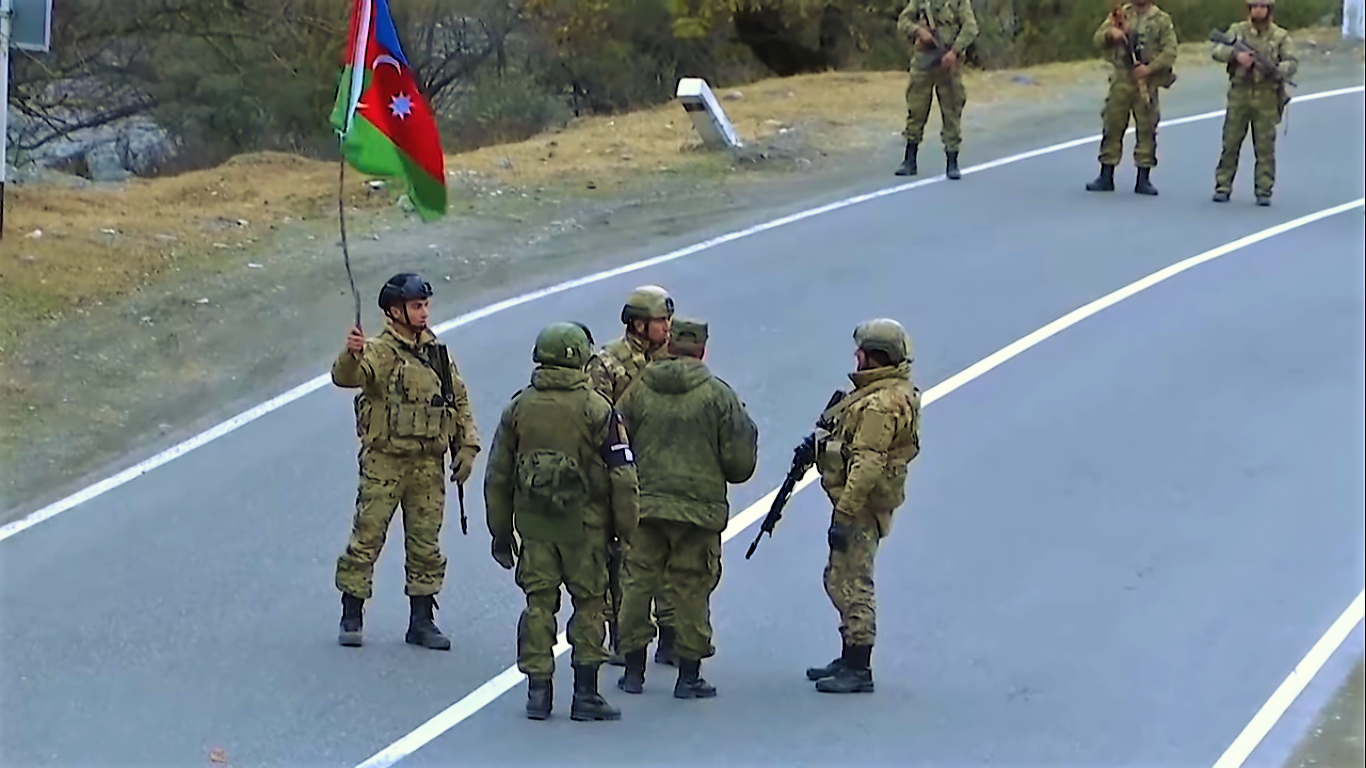
Russian peacekeepers and Azerbaijani military personnel near Dadivank of Kalbajar District.

In early January 2021, the Azerbaijani authorities accused the Russian peacekeepers of "exhibiting a pro-Armenia attitude, instead of taking the required neutral stance for the implementation of the peace agreement." Araz Aslanli, chairman of the Academy of State Customs Committee, stated that some practices of the Russian peacekeepers "did not contribute to the permanent solution of the Nagorno-Karabakh issue" and had caused "doubts in Azerbaijan and Turkey about Russia's good intentions." Nazim Jafarsoy, the deputy chair of the Caucasus International Relations and Strategic Studies Centre accused the Russian peacekeepers of causing the "continuation of the illegal military forces' presence in the region rather than providing peace between the Armenians and the Azerbaijanis." Rustam Muradov's meeting with senior Artsakh figures, and the presence of the Artsakh flag at Muradov's meetings resulted in negative reactions from the Azerbaijani authorities, while the usage of the phrase "Nagorno-Karabakh Republic" was removed from the official website of the Russian Ministry of Defence after Azerbaijan's objection. On 7 January, the Azerbaijani president Ilham Aliyev denounced the Armenian minister of foreign affairs, Ara Ayvazyan, for his recent visit to the Nagorno-Karabakh, calling it a "provocative step" and adding that if continued, "Armenia will regret even more." Aliyev also reiterated that Azerbaijan did not allow visit of any foreign citizen to Nagorno-Karabakh without its permission.

Despite allegations of being pro-Armenian, Armenian locals and officials from Artsakh have claimed that the Russian peacekeepers are profiting from Azerbaijan's ongoing blockade of the region, by charging several thousand dollars per vehicle of essential goods.

=== Allegations of being anti-Armenia or pro-Azerbaijan ===
In an interview on Armenian public television Secretary of Armenia's Security Council, Armen Grigoryan, made a statement suggesting that Lachin corridor crisis could be related to efforts from Russia and Belarus to push Armenia to join a Union State: "Armenia is under pressure in this regard, but when our democratic structures resist, we receive a different type of pressure — of the military variety".

After an incident on Hakari bridge on 15 June 2023, the Foreign Ministry of Armenia summoned the Russian Ambassador to express its strong displeasure about actions of peacekeepers for having escorted the Azerbaijani servicemen, who tied advancing into Armenian side to place an Azerbaijani flag. On June 21, 2023. the Spokeswoman of the Ministry of Foreign Affairs of Russia said the situation was due to lack of delimitation of the border between Armenia and Azerbaijan. This statement was followed by more harsh criticism from the Armenian Foreign Ministry spokeswoman stating that Maria Zakharova echoed Baku’s regular justifications of its “aggressive actions against Armenia’s borders”, pointing to the "contradiction" that a non-delimited border makes the peacekeepers' actions even less reasonable and urging to "implement their commitments, instead of seeking justifications" in view of the ongoing Lachin corridor blockade.

After a SEDE Delegation led by Nathalie Loiseau joined EUMA for a patrol near Lachin corridor she criticised the Russian peacekeepers for their inaction and inability to ensure safe and unhindered passage through the corridor as per the ceasefire agreement, stating: “If Russia has decided to agree with Azerbaijan, to be on Azerbaijan’s side, then it is time for Russia to say about it publicly.”

Meduza published a report uncovering guidelines distributed by the Kremlin to Russia’s state-controlled news media with instructions on the coverage of Azerbaijan's military offensive against Nagorno-Kharabakh, with instructions to stress that the assault was precipitated by Armenia and its Western “partners”.

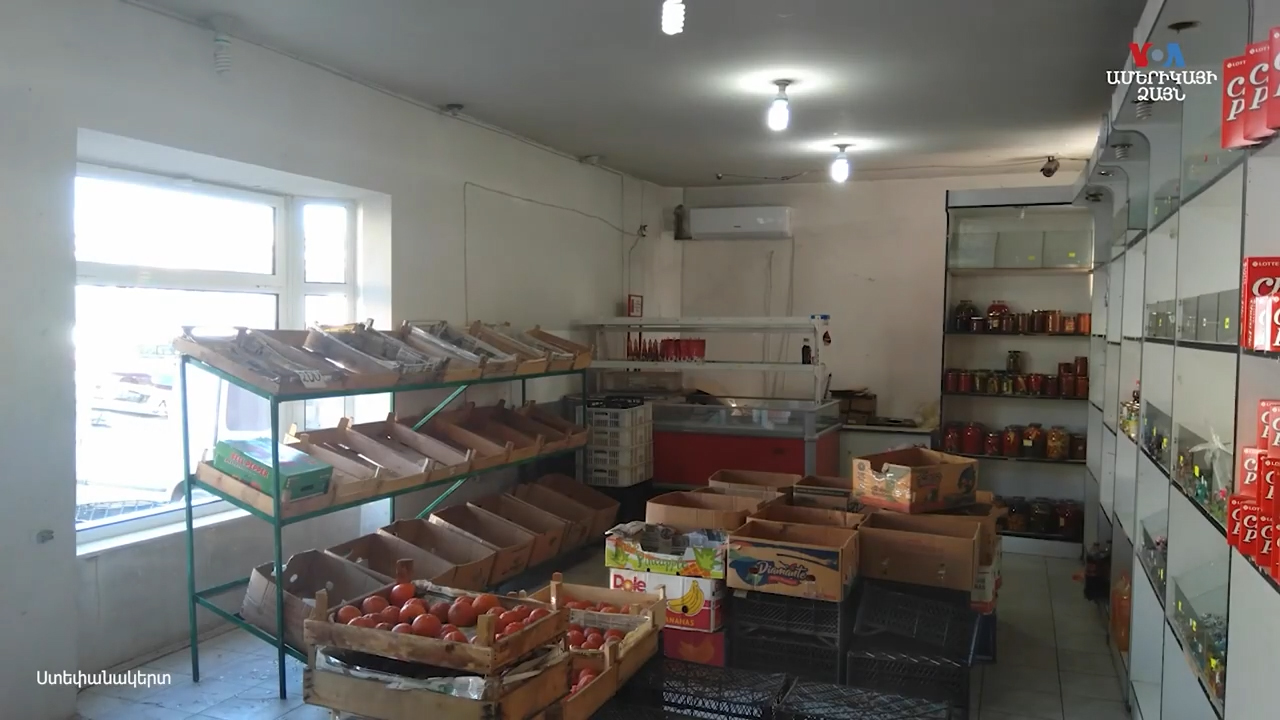

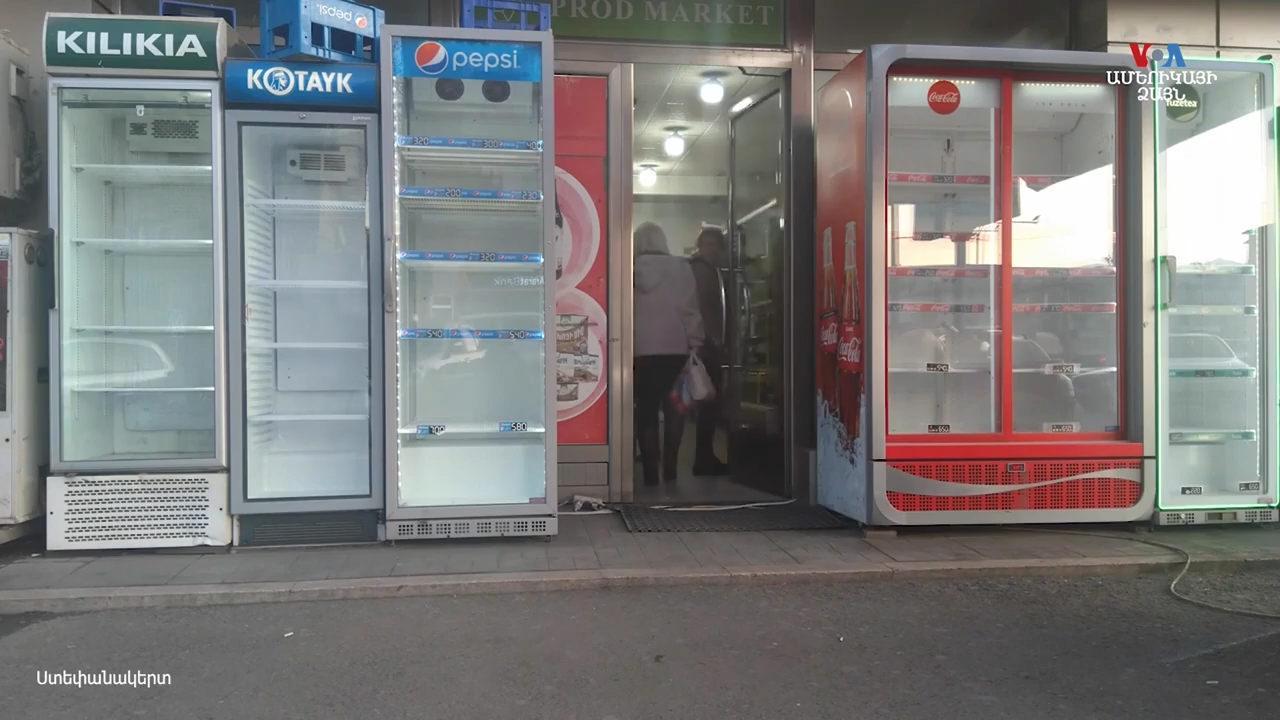
Empty grocery stores in Stepanakert during the blockade

=== Claims of violation of Azerbaijan's sovereignty ===
On 2 January 2021, the Turkish pro-government newspaper, Yeni Şafak, reported that Russia had violated the terms of the ceasefire agreement, sending over five thousand people to the region "under the name of soldiers, civil servants, technical experts, doctors, nurses and construction workers."

In late April, rehearsal began taking place at Stepanakert Airport for a victory day parade of peacekeepers. Many have seen this as a violation of the agreements signed in November 2020. The press service of the Azerbaijani opposition party Musavat assessed parade as an action that contradict the mandate of the peacekeeping forces and "prove the occupational nature of Russia’s actions in Karabakh". It also described it as "an insult" to the memory of the victims of the Khojaly massacre. The Ministry of Defense of Azerbaijan only acknowledged the planned parade on 8 May, the day before it was scheduled to take place, reiterating that the troops were in the region in accordance with the agreement.

=== Criticism for inability or unwillingness to fulfil obligations ===
==== Armenia and Nagorno-Kharabakh ====
A series of ceasefire violations led to criticism of the peacekeeping mission in the Armenian public and political circles. Prime Minister of Armenia Nikol Pashinyan pointed to "gross, prolonged violations of a ceasefire regime", recalling several episodes: "The December 11, 2020, capture of the villages of Khtsaberd and Hin Tagher and Armenian servicemen by Azerbaijan in the presence and connivance of Russian peacekeepers, the March 24, 2022, seizure of the village of Parukh in Nagorno-Karabakh again in the presence of Russian peacekeepers, the constant and increasing ceasefire violations along the line of contact, the cases of physical and psychological terror against the Armenians of Artsakh in the presence of peacekeepers are simply unacceptable".

Several political leaders and activists in Nagorno-Kharabakh met with the head of the Russian Peacekeepers to discuss the situation, after which some of the participants told media that they weren’t satisfied with assurances that the incidents would not be repeated and organised a protest action the next day, carrying banners reading: "Peacekeepers, where is the peace you promised?", "Stop Azerbaijani aggression", and "Return Parukh and Khtsaberd."

Eduard Aghajanian, the chairman of the Foreign Relations Committee, also expressed dismay that: "advancing Azerbaijani armed forces appeared behind the Russian peacekeepers’ backs" and said he expected "clear answers from our Russian partners about the conditions in which this happened".

The 2022-23 blockade of the Lachin corridor, resulted in renewed criticism of the peacekeepers. On 22 December 2022 Prime Minister Nikol Pashinyan stated that the peacekeeping contingent was not "fulfilling its obligation to control the Lachin corridor". He later underlined the importance of the peacekeeping mission, reminding that peacekeepers and the Russian Federation has made specific commitments to ensure the security of the Nagorno-Karabakh people and asked for clarifications on: "How does the Russian Federation assess the situation? What is its plan and road map to restore the Lachin corridor" also stating that if Russia "is unable to ensure stability and security in Nagorno-Karabakh for objective or subjective reasons, it should initiate discussions in the UN Security Council on giving Russian peacekeeping forces in Nagorno-Karabakh a UN Security Council mandate or sending additional multinational peacekeeping forces to Nagorno-Karabakh."

==== International bodies ====
The U.S. Helsinki Commission also criticised Russian peacekeepers role in the blockade of Artsakh: "This disturbing situation is further evidence that Russia is neither a reliable security provider nor a legitimate broker for peace in the South Caucasus".

In a letter to the US State Department, Senators Bob Menendez (Chairman of the Senate Foreign Relations Committee) and Jack Reed (Chairman of the Senate Armed Services Committee) also state that "Russian forces entrusted with keeping the peace have clearly failed in their duties".

The European Parliament adopted a resolution condemning the blockade of Artsakh and among other things also condemning "the inaction of Russian ‘peacekeepers’; considers that their replacement with OSCE international peacekeepers, under a UN mandate, should be negotiated urgently".

The Dutch Parliament in a resolution on the Lachin corridor blockade stated that: "Russian peacekeepers do not intervene in that area, and that this situation threatens to create a humanitarian emergency for the population of Nagorno-Karabakh."

Senior EU official blamed the Russian peacekeeping mission for green-lighting "Azerbaijan's blitzkrieg against Armenians" in Nagorno-Karabakh in September 2023, to destabilise Armenia and achieve change of leadership and of the current democratically elected prime minister "to be replaced by a pro-Russian figure".

== See also ==
- Armenia–Azerbaijan border crisis
