= Memorial Complex of Participants of the Great Patriotic War (Shusha) =

War memorial in Azerbaijan

- Azerbaijani: Böyük Vətən müharibəsi iştirakçılarının xatirə kompleksi (Şuşa)
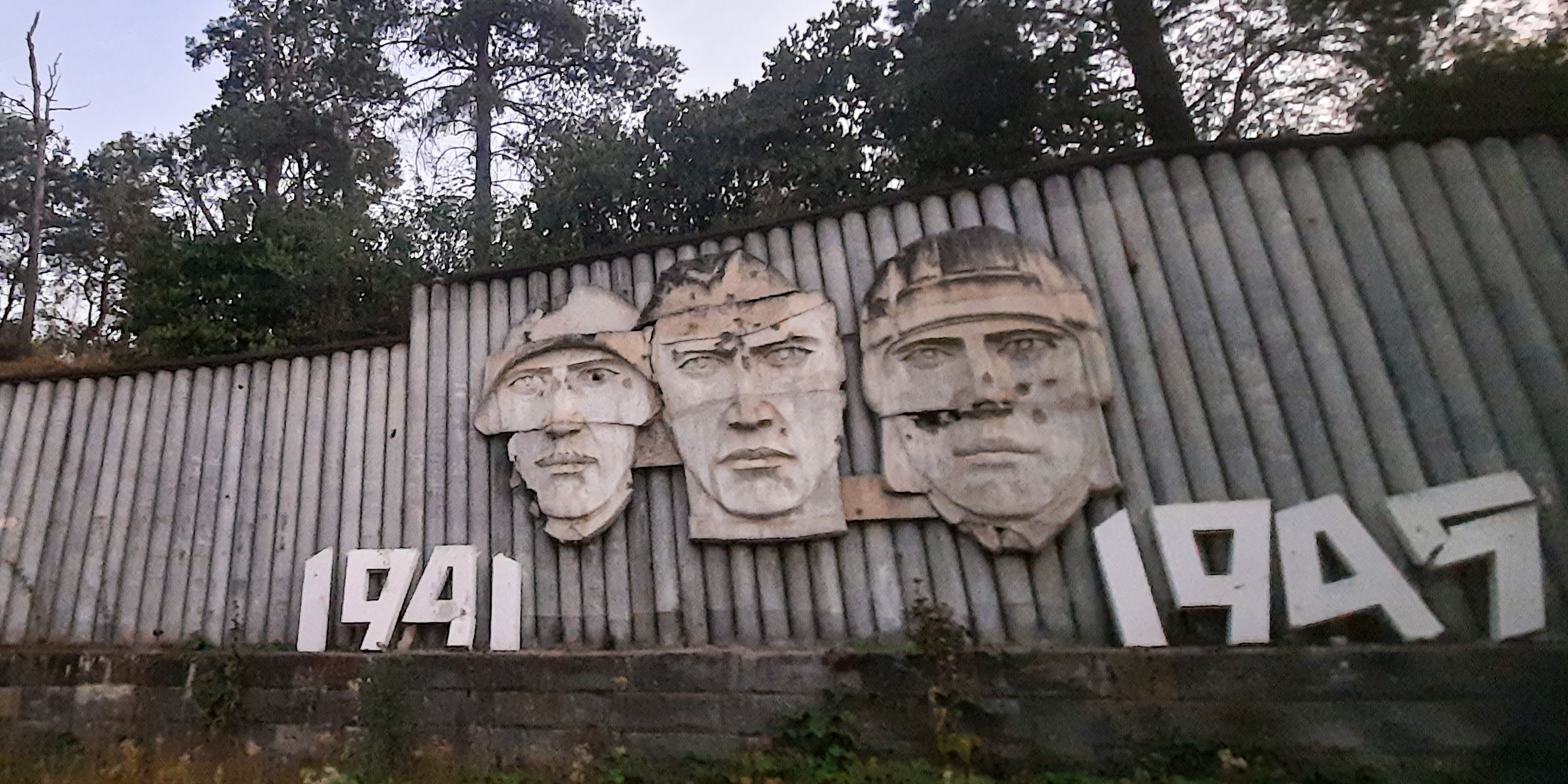
- Image from the Memorial Complex of the Participants of the Great Patriotic War in Shusha. The image was taken during the Shusha Human Rights project organized by the Baku Human Rights Club.
- 39°46′03″N 46°45′04″E
- Location: Shusha, Azerbaijan
- Type: Brutalist architecture
- Dedicated to: Participant of II World War

Memorial complex of the participants of the Great Patriotic War is a monument located on Khalil Mammadov Street in the city of Shusha, Azerbaijan. It is dedicated to the participants of the Second World War.

== Information ==
"Memorial complex of the participants of the Great Patriotic War" was built during the USSR rule and is dedicated to the participants of the Second World War. The complex includes bas-reliefs of Soviet soldiers, a park and the "Mothers Statue". The city of Shusha was occupied by the Armed Forces of Armenia in May 1992 and the bas-reliefs of the soldiers in the complex were shot, the "Mothers statue" was vandalized, and the eternal flame was extinguished. In November 2020, the territory of the complex was liberated from occupation together with the city. The complex is planned to be restored. In April 2021, residents of the city of Shusha, together with Russian peacekeepers, cleaned and painted the elements of the monumental complex to the participants of the Great Patriotic War of 1941-1945, as well as the arrangement of the adjacent area.
