= Səfixanlar =

- Location within Azerbaijan Location within Karabakh Economic Region
- Coordinates: 39°45′14″N 46°37′41″E
- Country: Azerbaijan
- District: Shusha
- Time zone: UTC+4 (AZT)

Safikhanlar (azerbaijani: Səfixanlar) is a village in the Shusha District of Azerbaijan. Saflkhanlar village is located near Saribaba Mountain.

== See also ==
- Səfixanlar at GEOnet Names Server
