= Marzili =

Marzili may refer to:

- Marzili, Bern, a neighbourhood in Bern, Switzerland
- Marzili (Azerbaijan), a village in Azerbaijan
