= Khudu Mammadov =

Soviet-Azerbaijani scientist, screenwriter, and nationalist ideologist

- Xudu Məmmədov
- Born: December 14, 1927; Mərzili, Aghdam District, Azerbaijan SSR, Soviet Union
- Died: October 15, 1988 (aged 60); Baku, Azerbaijani SSR, Soviet Union
- Citizenship: Soviet Union
- Education: Azerbaijan State University
- Spouse: Maya Mammadova
- Awards: Order of the Badge of Honour (1967); Order of the Red Banner of Labour (1986); Mammad Amin Rasulzadeh Prize (1990; posthumous)
- Scientific career
- Fields: Geology; Mineralogy
- Workplaces: Azerbaijan Academy of Sciences; Academy of Sciences of the Soviet Union
- Patrons: Heydar Afandiyev

Khudu Surkhay oglu Mammadov (Azerbaijani: Xudu Surxay oğlu Məmmədov; 14 December 1927 – 15 October 1988), was a Soviet-Azerbaijani scientist, screenwriter, and nationalist ideologist. Mammadov was a member of the ⁣⁣Azerbaijan Academy of Sciences and a Doctor of Geological and Mineralogical Sciences.

== Life ==
Khudu Surkhay oglu Mammadov was born on 14 December 1927, in Mərzili, Aghdam District of Azerbaijan SSR. He finished his secondary education in Aghdam, and got accepted to the Geology Department of the Geology-Geography Faculty of the Azerbaijan State University. Mammadov finished his tertiary education in 1951 with an honors diploma. He was later assigned to the Institute of Chemistry of the Azerbaijan Academy of Sciences.

Khudu Mammadov then received a post-graduate course at the Institute of Crystallography of the Academy of Sciences of the Soviet Union. The first subject of his Ph.D. dissertation was "Determination of the structure of borosilicate-axinite mineral". But on the eve of the acquisition of experimental materials to reveal the structure, Japanese researchers determined the structure of this mineral. In 1955, Mammadov successfully defended his dissertation on the "Crystal structure of xonotlite and wollastonite minerals" on the specialty of "Crystallography and Crystallophysics" at the Scientific Council of the Institute of Crystallography of the Academy of Sciences of the Soviet Union.

From 1957, he worked as the head of the laboratory of the structural chemistry of the Institute of Inorganic and Physical Chemistry of the Azerbaijan Academy of Sciences. His main scientific work is in the field of crystal chemistry. As a result of several years of research, Khudu Mammadov wrote the monograph of "Crystal chemistry of calcium silicates and hydrosilicates" in 1960. Khudu Mammadov met with J. D. Bernal on several occasions, and in 1966 he worked at this laboratory for a year. He was awarded the title of Doctor of Geological and Mineralogical Sciences in 1970, and Professor in 1973. Khudu Mammadov became a corresponding member of the Azerbaijani Academy of Sciences in 1976.

He is the author of 250 scientific works, 10 certificates of authorship, and 3 monographs. Under Mammadov's supervision, 10 doctors of sciences and 35 doctors of philosophy were trained.

He was awarded the Order of the Badge of Honour in 1967, the Order of the Red Banner of Labour in 1986, the Honorary Decree of the Supreme Soviet of the Azerbaijan SSR, and several medals.

He died on October 15, 1988, in Baku.

In 1990, he was posthumously awarded the Mammad Amin Rasulzadeh Prize by the Board of the Popular Front of Azerbaijan for his services to the national liberation movement.

== Works ==
- Məmmədov X.S. "Kalsium silikatları və hidrosilikatlarının kristallokimyası". Bakı. Azərb.EA-nın nəşriyyatı. 1960.128 s.
- Məmmədov X.S., Əmirəslanov İ.R., Nəcəfov H.N., Mürsəliyev A.A. "Naxışların yaddaşı". Azərb.Dövlət nəşriyyatı. Bakı, 1981. 102 s.
- Xudu Məmmədov "Elim köməyim olsun" Bakı, 2002, 121 s.
- Xudu Məmmədov "Qurdum ki, izim qala" Bakı, 2007. 360 s.
- Мамедов Х.С., Бахтияров И.Х. "Структурные аспекты перитектических реакций" Баку, ИФАН. 1988. 57 с.
- Доклады Академии Наук СССР: "О кристаллической структуре ринкита [Na (Ca, Ce)2 (Ti, Ce) O- (Si2O7)F] ", 1963 Том 150. №12, стр.167-170.
- Доклады Академии Наук СССР: "О кристаллической структуре минералов группы мурманита - ломоносовита", 1965, Том 162. №3, стр.1409-1411.
- Журнал структурной химии: "Кристаллическая и молекулярная структура бис-(-O-бензол-бензоата) медь (II) п-1-анилина", 1979, Том 20, №1, стр.89-93
- Доклады Академии Наук Азерб.ССР: "Кристаллическая и молекулярная структура п-нитробензоата диспрозия (III)", 1981, Том 37, №2,стр.42-45
- Журнал "Координационная химия": "Исследование термического разложения п-оксибензоатов металлов", 1986, Том 12, Выпуск 1. стр.37-46
- Журнал структурной химии "Структура дегидрата био(фермиато) био(никотинамит) диаквомеди (II)", 1986, Том 27, №2, стр.123-132
- Журнал "Координационная химия" "Кристаллическая и молекулярная структура комплекса [Pb(o-HOC6H4COO)2H2o]", 1987, Том 13, Выпуск 10, стр.1412-1417

== Bibliography ==
- Orxan Zakiroğlu (Baharlı). Ağdamın adlı-sanlı pedaqoqları, alimləri. Bakı, Sabah, 2001
- Orxan Zakiroğlu (Baharlı). Ağdam şəhər 1 nömrəli orta məktəbin tarixi (1883-1993). I kitab. Bakı, 2016
