= Farukh =

Parukh / Farukh Փառուխ / Farux
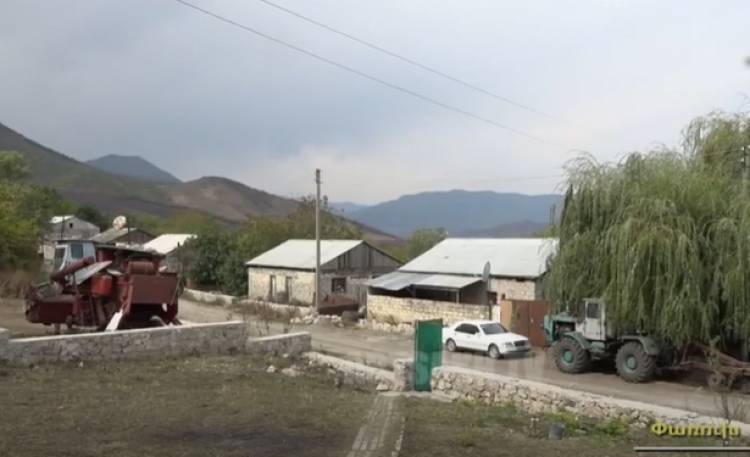

- Location within Azerbaijan Location within Karabakh Economic Region
- Coordinates: 40°00′59″N 46°48′04″E
- Country: Azerbaijan
  - District: Khojaly

Population (2015)
  - Total: 72
- Time zone: UTC+4 (AZT)

Parukh (Armenian: Փառուխ) or Farukh (Azerbaijani: Farux, also Fərrux, Farrukh; Russian: Фарух), is an Armenian-populated village located in the Khojaly District of Azerbaijan, in the disputed region of Nagorno-Karabakh. Until 2023 it was controlled by the breakaway Republic of Artsakh. The village had an ethnic Armenian-majority population until the expulsion of the Armenian population of Nagorno-Karabakh by Azerbaijan following the 2023 Azerbaijani offensive in Nagorno-Karabakh.

== History ==
During the Soviet period, the village was part of the Askeran District of the Nagorno-Karabakh Autonomous Oblast. On 24 March 2022, Azerbaijani forces crossed the line of contact established after the 2020 Nagorno-Karabakh ceasefire agreement, advancing towards the village, with initial reports stating that the forces had entered the village and surrounding areas. On 27 March 2022, the Russian Defense Ministry reported that Azerbaijani forces had withdrawn from the village. According to the Ministry of Defence of Azerbaijan, withdrawal of units and change in the positions didn't happen. According to Artsakh authorities, despite Azerbaijani forces having left the settlement, they continue to occupy a piece of the Karaglukh mountain. On 9 June 2022, Russian foreign minister Sergey Lavrov promised that a solution for the situation in the village will be provided in the process of demarcation between Armenia and Azerbaijan.

== Historical heritage sites ==
Historical heritage sites in and around the village include the Armenian cemetery of Kalen Khut (Armenian: Կալեն Խութ) from between the 9th and 13th centuries, with a distinctive khachkar, approximately one kilometer to the southwest of the village. To the southeast of Parukh there is a height with the ruins of the village of Karaglukh (Armenian: Քարագլուխ, lit. 'head of the rock'). On the road between Parukh and Karaglukh there are three khachkars, with one of them being notable due to its use as a road sign. In and around Karaglukh there is a cemetery from between the 13th and 20th centuries with two distinctive khachkars, as well as the notable khachkar of Mote Jur (Armenian: Մոտե Ջուր, lit. 'by water') near the cemetery. The cemetery has one gravestone from 1253 dating from the period of the Kingdom of Artsakh, as well as one gravestone with a relief of a rider with a sword where an Armenian soldier that died in 1918 during the Armenian–Azerbaijani War is buried. Nearby is also the St. Astvatsatsin Church from the late medieval period with khachkars in the walls, possibly built on the foundations of an earlier 13th-century basilica, as well as settlement ruins and a cemetery from between the 16th and 17th centuries.

== Economy and culture ==
The population is mainly engaged in agriculture and animal husbandry. As of 2015, the village has a municipal building, the Parukh branch of the Khramort Secondary School, and a medical centre. The community of Parukh includes the uninhabited village of Karaglukh.

== Demographics ==
The village has an ethnic Armenian-majority population, had 42 inhabitants in 2005, and 72 inhabitants in 2015.
