= Hin Tagher =

Hin Tagher Հին Թաղեր
- Köhnə Tağlar
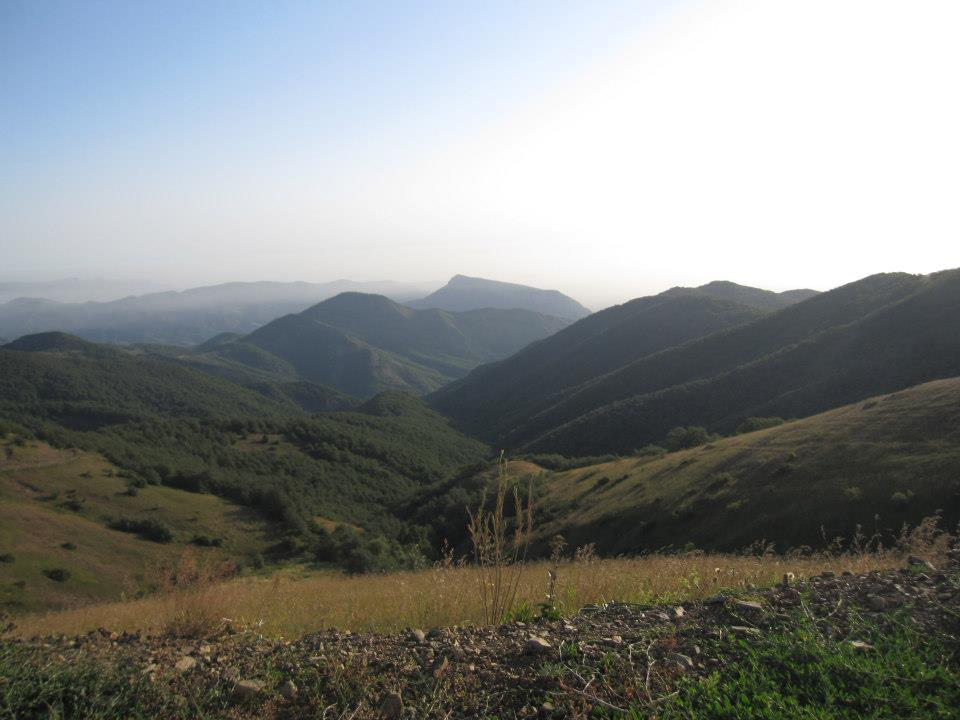
- Scenery around Dizapayt Mountain (Azerbaijani: Ziyarət dağı) and Katarovank, near Hin Tagher

- Location within Azerbaijan Location within Karabakh Economic Region
- Coordinates: 39°30′27″N 46°49′25″E
- Country: Azerbaijan
- District: Khojavend
- Elevation: 1,578 m (5,177 ft)

Population (2015)
  - Total: 96
- Time zone: UTC+4 (AZT)

Hin Tagher (Armenian: Հին Թաղեր) or Kohne Taghlar (Azerbaijani: Köhnə Tağlar; Armenian: Քյոհնյա Թաղլար) is a village in the Khojavend District of Azerbaijan. The village had an ethnic Armenian-majority population prior to the 2020 Nagorno-Karabakh war, and also had an Armenian majority in 1989. The Katarovank Monastery is located close to the village.

== Toponymy ==
The village was known as Hin Taghlar (Armenian: Հին Թաղլար; Russian: Хин Таглар; Azerbaijani: Hin Tağlar) during the Soviet period.

== History ==
The village was collectivized in 1931–1932, and electricity was brought to it in 1964. 220 residents of the village fought in World War II, of which 100 died. There is a World War II memorial in the village to honour the dead. During the Soviet period, the village was part of the Hadrut District of the Nagorno-Karabakh Autonomous Oblast. After the First Nagorno-Karabakh War, the village was administrated as part of the Hadrut Province of the breakaway Republic of Artsakh.

Hin Tagher, Khtsaberd/Chaylaggala and Katarovank became an Artsakh holdout in the Hadrut Province during the 2020 Nagorno-Karabakh war. Clashes erupted around the Armenian holdout pocket despite the ceasefire agreement, and it was reported that Hin Tagher was captured by Azerbaijan on 12 December, with some clashes continuing in the area. Russian peacekeepers arrived to the area on 13 December 2020. Subsequently, it was reported that Hin Tagher and Khtsaberd/Chaylaggala came under Azerbaijani control as Russian peacekeepers removed the area from their map of responsibility on 14 December 2020.

== Historical heritage sites ==
Historical heritage sites in and around the village include a village and khachkars from between the 9th and 11th centuries, a 17th-century cemetery, and the 19th-century church of Surb Amenaprkich (Armenian: Սուրբ Ամենափրկիչ, lit. 'Holy Savior').

== Demographics ==
In 1920, the village had a population of 400, but by 1987, the number had dropped to 198 villagers, with all of them being Armenian.

The village had 168 inhabitants in 2005, and 96 inhabitants in 2015.

== Gallery ==
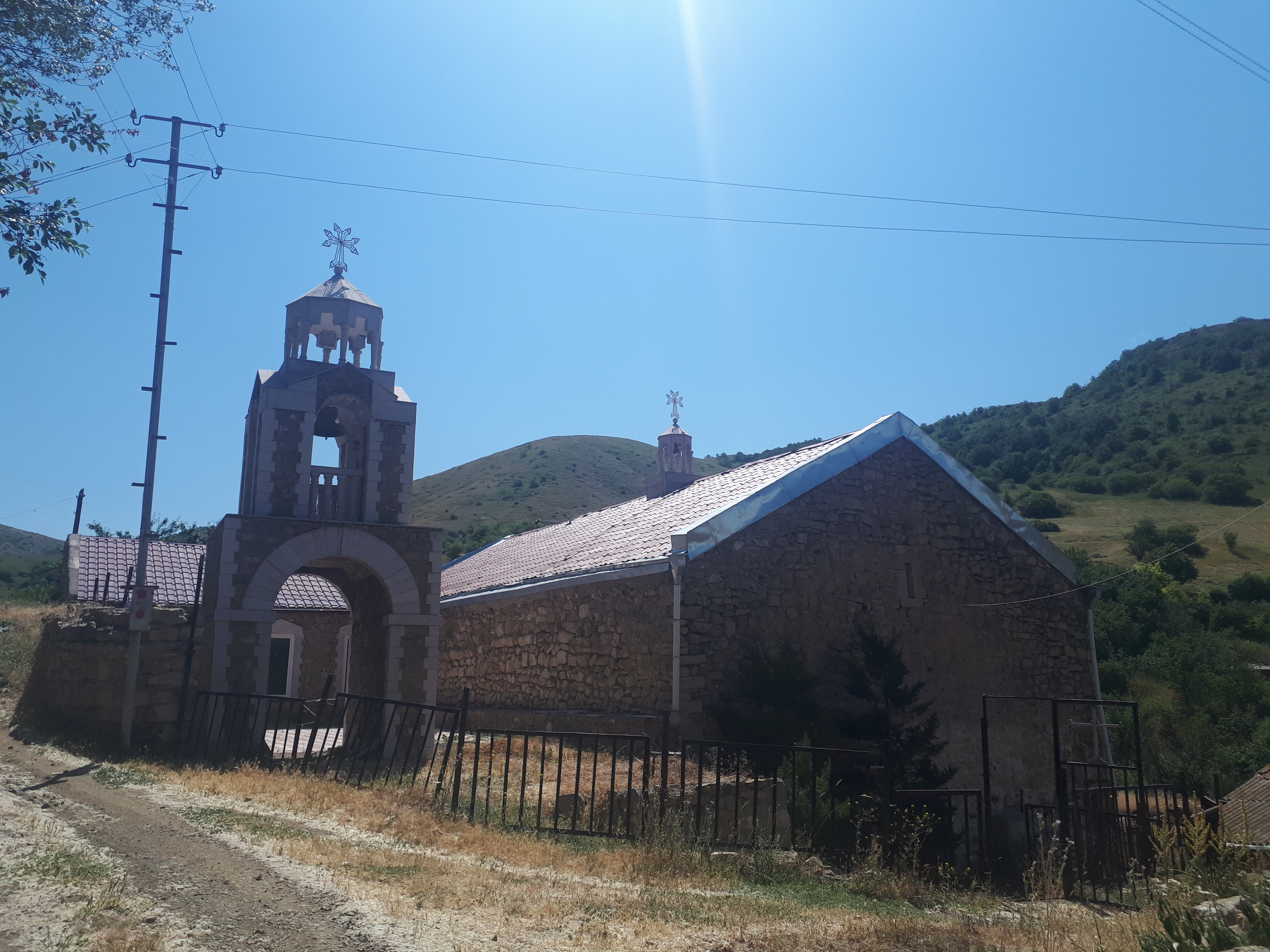
The Holy Savior Church in Hin Tagher
