= Katarovank =

Armenian monastery in the Khojavend District of Azerbaijan

- Կատարովանք
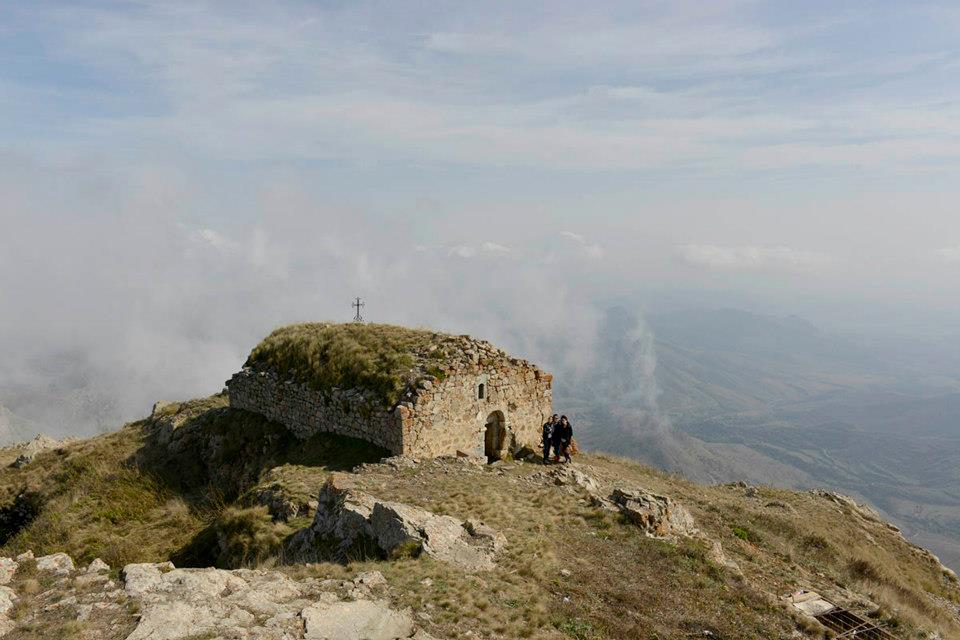
- The monastery of Katarovank

- Location within Azerbaijan Location within Karabakh Economic Region

Religion
- Affiliation: Armenian Apostolic Church
- Year consecrated: before 335 AD

Location
- Location: near the village of Hin Tagher, Nagorno-Karabakh
- Country: Azerbaijan
- Coordinates: 39°31′34″N 46°51′24″E

Architecture
- Architect: yes
- Type: Monastery, Church
- Style: Armenian
- Completed: 4th century, 17th century
- Materials: sandstone

Katarovank (Armenian: Կատարովանք; Azerbaijani: Qatərəvəng) is an Armenian Apostolic monastery in the region of Nagorno-Karabakh, Azerbaijan. It is located close to the village of Hin Tagher (Köhnə Tağlar). The monastery was founded in the 4th century, but the present structure was completed in the 17th century.

== History and architecture ==
The 5th-century Armenian historian Pavstos Buzand, known for his six-volume History of Armenia, describes Katarovank as a large monastery built on top of the Dizapayt Mountain (Azerbaijani: Ziyarət dağı). Buzand mentions the monastery in the context of his story about the invasion of Armenia by the Massagetae and Huns in 335 AD. In that year, a large army led by King Sanesan invaded Armenia's eastern provinces as a reaction to the mission of St. Grigoris—the grandson of St. Gregory the Illuminator and bishop of eastern lands of Armenia. St. Grigoris led an Armenian mission to convert the Massagetae tribesmen into Christianity. The mission gained true success when the missionaries managed to turn three of Sanesan's own sons into Christianity.

Suspicious of St. Grigoris, Sanesan ordered to execute the saint on the plain of Vatnean by tying him to a wild horse. His children fled the royal palace together with St. Grigoris' missionaries who carried with them St. Grigoris' body. The children decided to hide in the mountaintop Katarovank Monastery, which at the time hosted as many as 3870 hermits and pilgrims. But Sanesan in his pursuit of the children reached the monastery and killed all the inhabitants of Katarovank, including his own children. The monastery was destroyed by the Hun soldiers and the corpses of the killed were burned.

The present-day chapel is a 17th-century structure. It is a single nave basilica constructed from the blocks of local coarse-cut sandstone. One side of the chapel is below the ground while the other is built on bare rock. There are Armenian khachkars near the chapel. The monastery offers a unique panoramic view to the River Aras.

=== 2020 Nagorno-Karabakh war ===
Khtsaberd (Çaylaqqala), Hin Tagher (Köhnə Tağlar) and Katarovank had been an Artsakh holdout in the Hadrut Province during the 2020 Nagorno-Karabakh war. Clashes erupted around the Armenian holdout pocket despite the ceasefire agreement, with Azerbaijani forces taking control of Hin Tagher and advancing towards the area of Khtsaberd on 12 December 2020. Russian peacekeepers were reported to have arrived on 13 December 2020. Subsequently, it was reported that the villages were and this monastery came under Azerbaijani control as Russian peacekeepers removed the area from their map of responsibility on 14 December 2020.

== Gallery ==
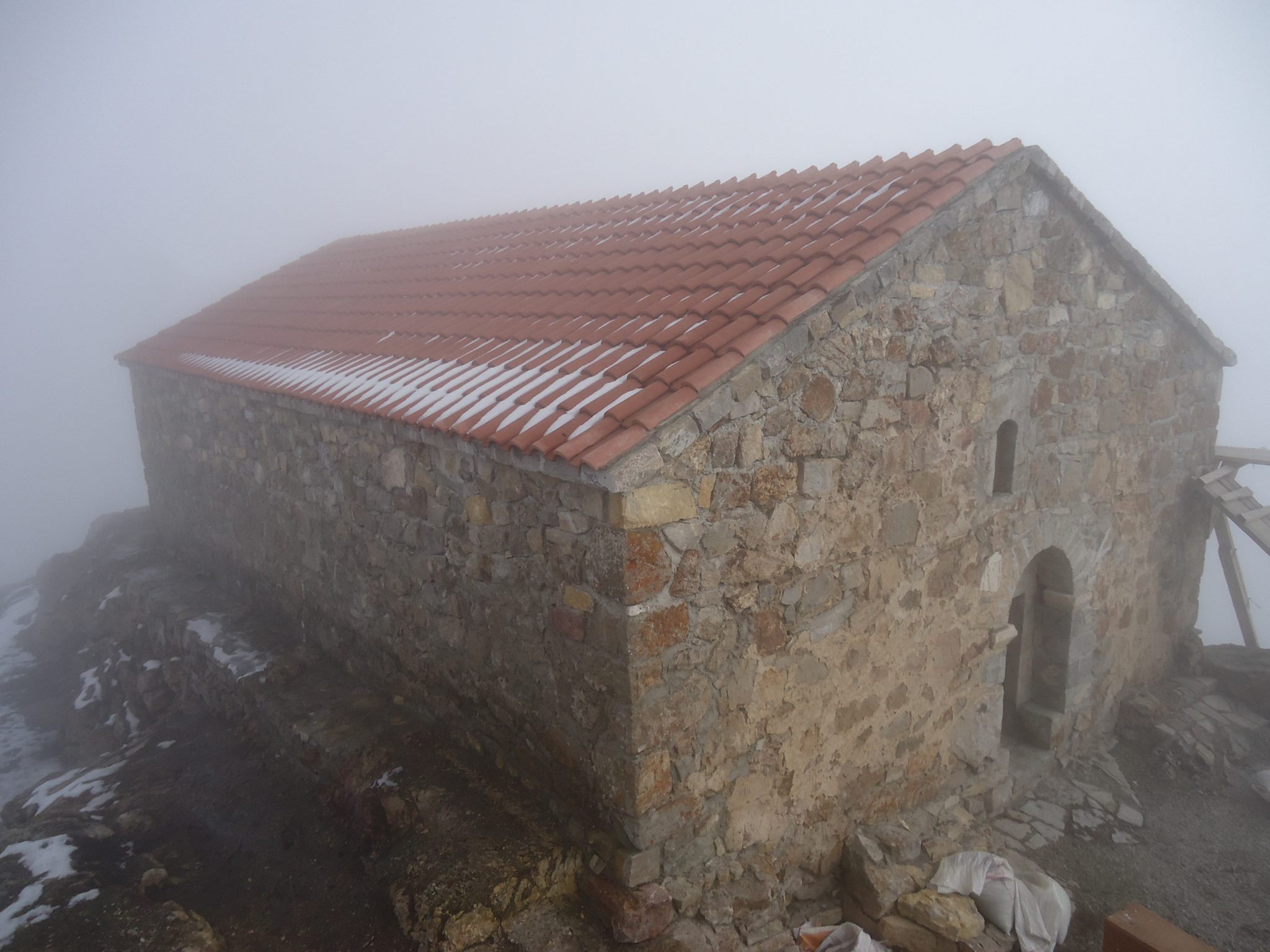
Katarovank

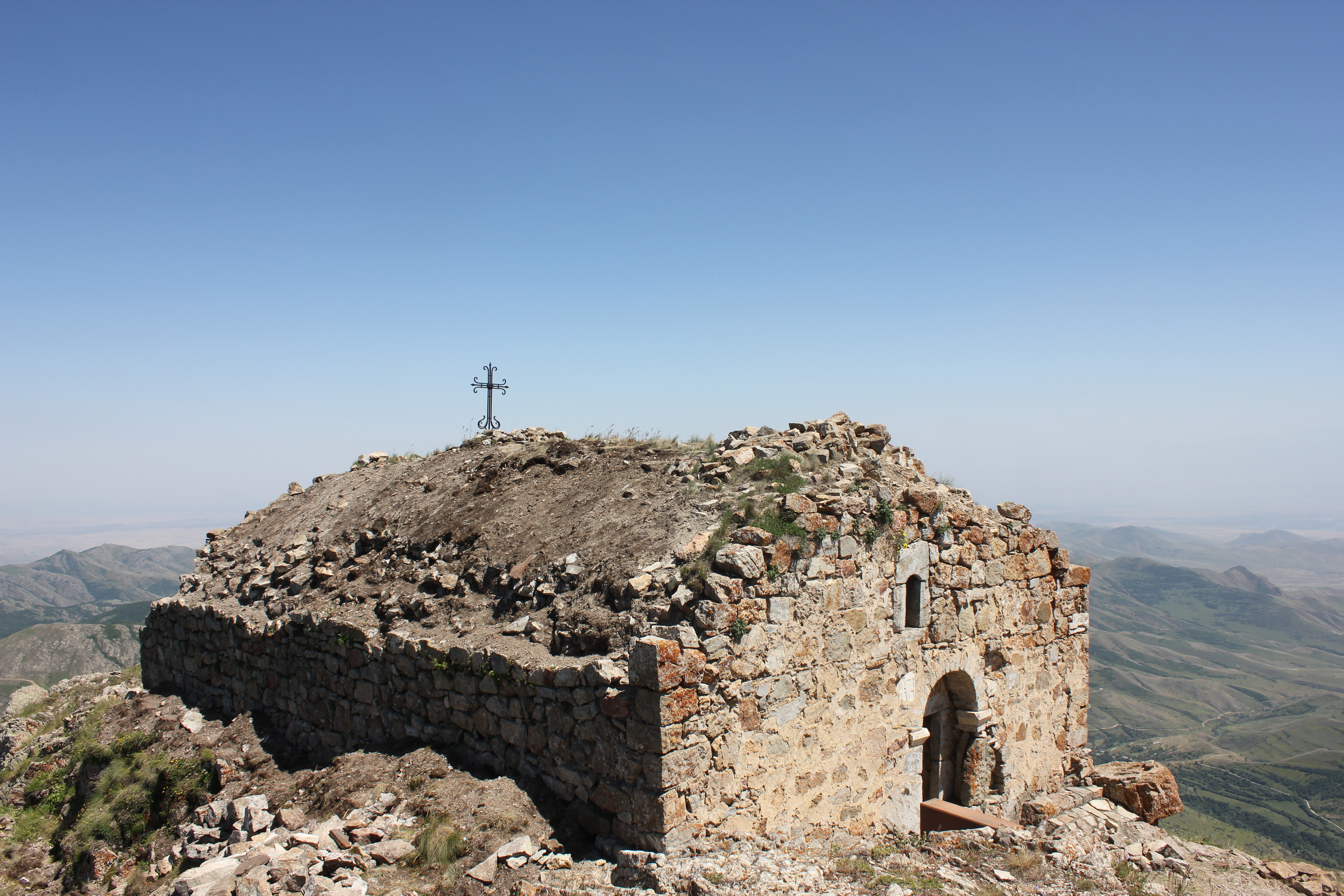
Katarovank

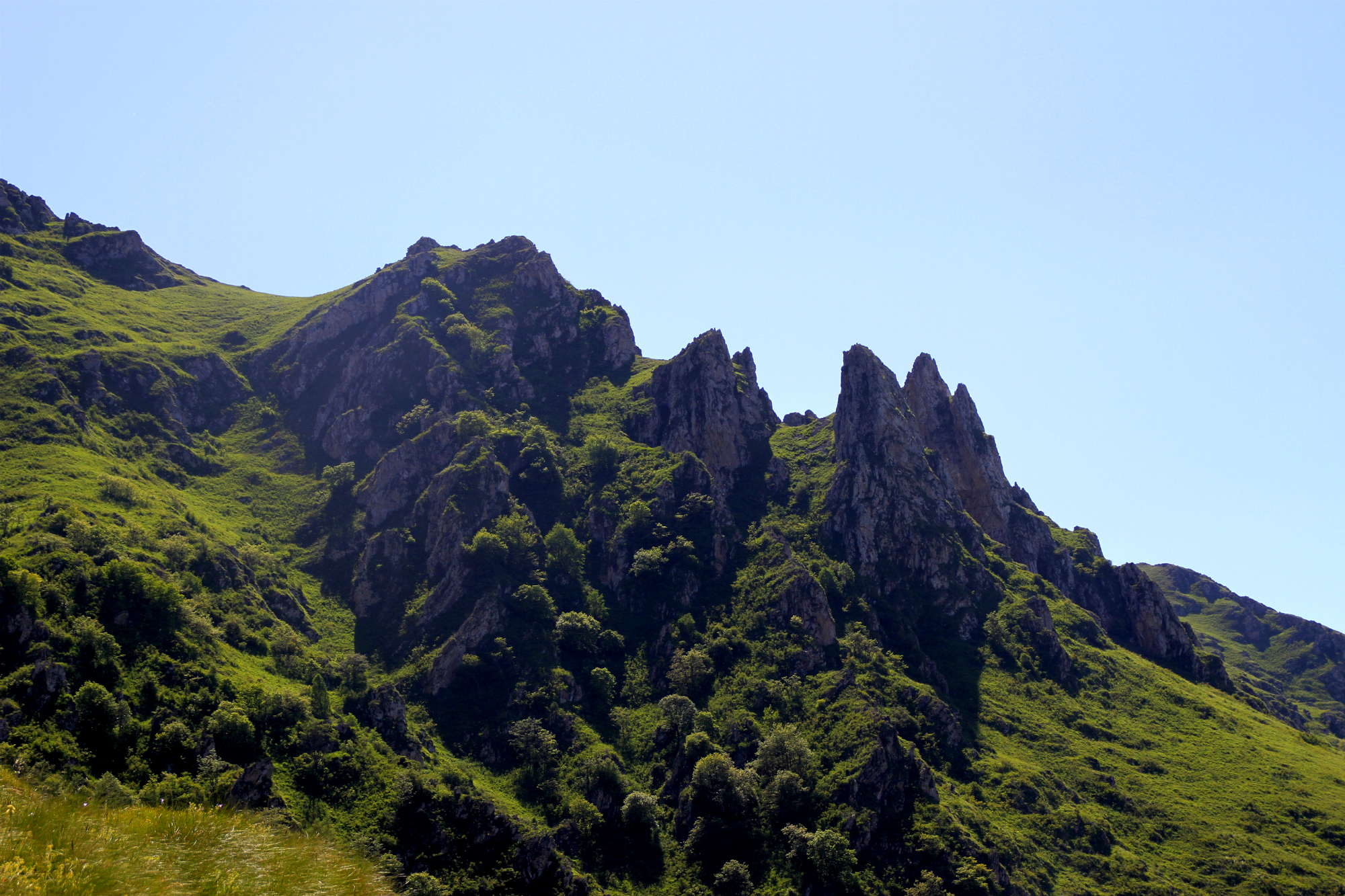
Scenery around Katarovank

== Books ==
- The Epic Histories: Attributed to P'awstos Buzand. Columbia University Press, Department of Near Eastern Languages and Civilizations, 1989
- Movses Kalankatuatsi. History of the Land of Aluank, translated from Old Armenian by Sh. V. Smbatian. Yerevan: Matenadaran (Institute of Ancient Manuscripts), 1984, Book I, chapter 14, in Russian.
- (in Italian) Documenti di architettura armena, Alexandr L. Jakobson – 1986 – 73 p.
