= Çaylaqqala =

Chaylaggala / Khtsaberd Çaylaqqala / Խծաբերդ
- Location within Azerbaijan
- Coordinates: 39°32′45″N 46°46′15″E
- Country: Azerbaijan
- District: Khojavend
- Elevation: 1,623 m (5,325 ft)

Population (2015)
  - Total: 120
- Time zone: UTC+4 (AZT)

Chaylaggala (Azerbaijani: Çaylaqqala) or Khtsaberd (Armenian: Խծաբերդ) is a village in the Khojavend District of Azerbaijan, in the disputed region of Nagorno-Karabakh. The village had an ethnic Armenian-majority population prior to the 2020 Nagorno-Karabakh war, and also had an Armenian majority in 1989.

== History ==
The village was collectivized in 1932, and electricity was brought to it in 1962. 155 residents of the village fought in World War II, of which 84 died. There is a World War II memorial in the village to honour the dead. During the Soviet period, the village was part of the Hadrut District of the Nagorno-Karabakh Autonomous Oblast. After the First Nagorno-Karabakh War, the village was administrated as part of the Hadrut Province of the breakaway Republic of Artsakh.

The village, together with Hin Tagher and Katarovank, became an Artsakh holdout in the Hadrut Province during the 2020 Nagorno-Karabakh war. Clashes erupted around the Armenian holdout pocket despite the ceasefire agreement, and it was reported that the villages were captured by Azerbaijan on 12 December, with some clashes continuing in the area. Russian peacekeepers arrived to the area on 13 December 2020. Subsequently, it was reported that the villages came under Azerbaijani control as Russian peacekeepers removed the area from their map of responsibility on 14 December 2020.

== Historical heritage sites ==
Historical heritage sites in and around the village include the 16th/17th-century church of Yeghtsan Dzor (Armenian: Եղցան ձոր), a 16th/17th-century khachkar, a cemetery from between the 17th and 19th centuries, a 19th-century watermill, and a simple Armenian church that was built in 1836, which was semi-ruined by 1990.

== Demographics ==
In 1987, there were 52 households with 154 inhabitants, all of them Armenian.

The village had 143 inhabitants in 2005, and 120 inhabitants in 2015.

== Notable people ==
- Artashes Poghosyan - Armenian poet
