= Khramort =

Khramort / Pirlar Խրամորթ / Pirlər
- Location within Azerbaijan
- Coordinates: 39°59′31″N 46°50′12.9″E
- Country: Azerbaijan
  - District: Khojaly
- Elevation: 575 m (1,886 ft)

Population (2015)
  - Total: 524
- Time zone: UTC+4 (AZT)

Khramort (Armenian: Խրամորթ; Azerbaijani: Xramort) or Pirlar (Azerbaijani: Pirlər) is a village in the Khojaly District of Azerbaijan, in the disputed region of Nagorno-Karabakh. Until 2023 it was controlled by the breakaway Republic of Artsakh. The village had an ethnic Armenian-majority population until the expulsion of the Armenian population of Nagorno-Karabakh by Azerbaijan following the 2023 Azerbaijani offensive in Nagorno-Karabakh.

== History ==
During the Soviet period, the village was a part of the Askeran District of the Nagorno-Karabakh Autonomous Oblast.

Armenpress reported that Azerbaijan continuously violated the 2020 Nagorno-Karabakh ceasefire agreement in the direction of the village.

== Historical heritage sites ==
Historical heritage sites in and around the village include a 13th-century khachkar, the 19th-century church of Surb Astvatsatsin (Armenian: Սուրբ Աստվածածին, lit. 'Holy Mother of God'), a 19th/20th-century cemetery, as well as World War II and Artsakh War memorials.

== Economy and culture ==
The population is mainly engaged in agriculture and animal husbandry. As of 2015, the village has a municipal building, a house of culture, a secondary school and a medical centre.

== Demographics ==
The village had 403 inhabitants in 2005, and 524 inhabitants in 2015.
