= Mərzili =

Village in Azerbaijan

Marzili
- Location within Azerbaijan Location within Karabakh Economic Region
- Coordinates: 39°55′59.2″N 47°03′36″E
- Country: Azerbaijan
- District: Aghdam

Population (1981)
  - Total: 3,400
- Time zone: UTC+4 (AZT)

Marzili (Azerbaijani: Mərzili) is a village in the Aghdam District of Azerbaijan.

== History ==
Marzili was part of the Shusha Uyezd of Elisabethpol Governorate during the Russian Empire. According to 1886 census data, there were 273 homes and 1,079 Azerbaijanis (classified as "Tatars" in the census) of the Shiite branch of Islam in Mərzili. According to the 1912 "Caucasian Calendar", the village of Mərzili was home to 1,625 people, the majority of whom were Azerbaijanis (classified as "Tatars" in the census).

Mərzili was part of the village council of the same name in the Aghdam District of the Azerbaijan SSR during the early Soviet period in 1933. The village had 174 farms and a total population of 2,221 people. The population of the village council was 100 percent Azerbaijani.

The village had 3,400 residents in 1981. Its residents' main occupations were viticulture, agriculture, animal husbandry, and sericulture. There was a middle school, a vocational school, a cultural centre, two libraries, a sheep-breeding complex, a communication department, and a hospital in the village.

During the First Nagorno-Karabakh War on 11 June 1993, Armenian forces occupied the village, forcing the Azerbaijani population to flee. It was in this village that the Armenian-American commander Monte Melkonian was killed by Azerbaijani forces. After 1994, it was later incorporated into the self-proclaimed Republic of Artsakh as part of its Martuni Province, where it remained a ghost village. Mərzili was returned to Azerbaijan on 20 November 2020 as part of the 2020 Nagorno-Karabakh ceasefire agreement.

== Demographics ==
Year	Population	Ethnic composition	Source
1886	1,079	100% Tatars (i.e. Azerbaijanis)	Transcaucasian Statistical Committee
1912	1,625	Mainly Tatars	Caucasian Calendar
1933	2,221	100% Azerbaijanis	Statistics of Azerbaijan SSR
1981	3,400		Azerbaijani Soviet Encyclopedia
11 June 1993: Occupation of Marzili. Expulsion of Azerbaijani population

== Notable natives ==
- Khudu Mammadov – Scientist and screenwriter
