= Caboolture–Bribie Island Road =

Road in Queensland, Australia

Caboolture–Bribie Island Road Bribie Island Road Queensland

General information
- Type: Road
- Length: 19.2 km (12 mi)
- Route number(s): (Caboolture – Bribie Island)

Major junctions
- West end: Bruce Highway, Caboolture
- Caboolture–Beachmere Road; Bestmann Road
- East end: Benabrow Avenue, Bribie Island

Location(s)
- Major suburbs: Ningi, Sandstone Point

Caboolture–Bribie Island Road is a continuous 19.2 kilometres (11.9 mi) road route in the City of Moreton Bay, Queensland, Australia. The route is designated as part of State Route 85. It is a state-controlled district road (number 126) rated as a local road of regional significance (LRRS).

== Route description ==
Caboolture–Bribie Island Road commences at an intersection with the Bruce Highway in Caboolture as State Route 85. Known as Bribie Island Road it runs east, passing the Caboolture–Beachmere Road exit, and then turns north-east. After passing the Old Toorbul Point Road exit it enters the locality of Ningi and turns south-east, east, and north-east before reaching the village of Ningi. Here it passes the Bestmann Road exit and turns south-east to Sandstone Point, again turning north-east and then south-east. The road passes the exit to Bestmann Road East as it turns north-east to the Bribie Island Bridge. It crosses to the eastern end of the bridge, where it ends at an intersection with Welsby Parade and Sylvan Beach Esplanade. State Route 85 continues east as Benabrow Avenue.

Land use along the road is mainly rural, but with business and residential developments at each end and in Ningi village.

== Road condition ==
The road is fully sealed, with several sections of dual carriageway. The Queensland Government has a long-term plan to upgrade the entire length of the road to four lanes. The following projects aim to improve the condition of sections of this road.

=== Old Toorbul Point Road intersection ===
A project to upgrade the intersection with Old Toorbul Point Road, part of a $30.4 million upgrade strategy, was completed in September 2021.

=== Regina Avenue intersection ===
A project to upgrade the intersection with Regina Avenue in Ningi, at a cost of $3 million, was in the pre-construction stage in July 2022.

=== Duplication between Hickey Road and King Johns Creek ===
A project to plan the future duplication of the road between Hickey Road and King Johns Creek in Caboolture, part of a $20.95 million upgrade strategy, was expected to be completed in 2022.

=== Duplication between Old Toorbul Point Road and Saint Road ===
A project to plan the duplication of the road between Old Toorbul Point Road and Saint Road, part of a $30.4 million upgrade strategy, was in detailed design in July 2022.

=== Planning for duplicate Bribie Island Bridge ===
A project for planning and preliminary design of a duplicate Bribie Island Bridge, at a cost of $4 million, is expected to be completed in mid-2024.

== History ==
The Caboolture area was colonised by European people in 1842 when the land around the Moreton Bay penal colony was opened up to free settlers. By the mid-1860s farms had been established and the local pastoralists were experimenting with sugar cane and cotton. Some of these farms may have been to the east, along the line of the present road to Bribie Island.

In 1912 the settlement of Bongaree was established on Bribie Island, with a jetty, a few basic buildings, a postal service, and a regular service by the Steamship Koopa from Brisbane via Redcliffe. By 1953 a barge was ferrying motor vehicles from Toorbul Point (now Sandstone Point) to the island, thus greatly increasing the usage of the road from Caboolture. The Bribie Island Bridge was built in 1963, further increasing traffic on the road.

== Current usage ==
Bribie Island now has a large resident population (estimated to exceed 20,000 in June 2021) and is a popular tourist destination. It is likely that many residents commute to Caboolture or Brisbane for work, resulting in the road being very heavily used.

== Major intersections ==
All distances are from Google Maps. The entire road is in the City of Moreton Bay.

Location	km	mi	Destinations	Notes
Caboolture	0– 0.4	0.0– 0.25	Bruce Highway – north – Sunshine Coast – south – Brisbane; Lower King Street – south–west – Caboolture CBD; Western Service Road – north – to D'Aguilar Highway	Western end of Caboolture–Bribie Island Road (State Route 85); Roadway continues south–west as Caboolture Connection Road (Lower King Street)
Caboolture	0.65	0.40	Caboolture–Beachmere Road – south, then south–east – Beachmere; Aerodrome Road – north – Caboolture Airfield	Road continues east.
Caboolture	5	3.1	Old Toorbul Point Road – north, then north–west – Elimbah	Road continues north–east.
Ningi	11.4	7.1	Bestmann Road – south–east – Godwin Beach, Sandstone Point	Road continues east.
Sandstone Point	17.9	11.1	Bestmann Road East – south – Sandstone Point Village, Godwin Beach	Road continues east, then north–east.
Pumicestone Channel	18.4– 19.2	11.4– 11.9	Bribie Island Bridge	
Bellara / Bongaree midpoint	19.2	11.9	Benabrow Avenue – north–east – Bongaree, Woorim; Sylvan Beach Esplanade – north–west – Bellara; Welsby Parade – south–east – Bongaree	Eastern end of Caboolture–Bribie Island Road.
1.000 mi = 1.609 km; 1.000 km = 0.621 mi

== Caboolture–Beachmere Road ==
Caboolture–Beachmere Road
- Beachmere Road
- Location: Caboolture–Bribie Island Road, Caboolture to Biggs Avenue, Beachmere
- Length: 9.2 km (5.7 mi)

Caboolture–Beachmere Road is a state-controlled district road (number 128) rated as a local road of regional significance (LRRS). It runs from Caboolture–Bribie Island Road in Caboolture to Biggs Avenue on the Beachmere foreshore, a distance of 9.2 kilometres (5.7 mi).

A project to provide safety improvements to this road, at a cost of $15.275 million, was to commence detailed design in mid-2022.

== See also ==
- List of road routes in Queensland
- List of numbered roads in Queensland
