= Caboolture Bus Lines =

Australian bus services operator

- Founded: 1988
- Headquarters: Caboolture
- Service area: Brisbane
- Service type: Bus operator
- Routes: 12
- Hubs: Caboolture station
- Depots: 2
- Fleet: 66 (December 2022)
- Website: www.cbus.biz

Caboolture Bus Lines is an Australian operator of bus services in the northern suburbs of Brisbane. It operates 12 services under contract to the Queensland Government under the Translink banner.

== History ==
Caboolture Bus Lines was founded in 1988 by Grant and Jannette Craike with two buses. In July 2020 Bribie Island Coaches was acquired.

== Routes ==
| Route | From | To | Via | Notes |
|---|---|---|---|---|
| 640 | Bribie Island | Caboolture | Woorim, Bongaree, Bribie Island Shopping Centre, Ningi | |
| 641 | Banksia Beach | Bongaree | Bellara & Bribie Island Shopping Centre | |
| 642 | Bribie Island park 'n' ride | Bongaree | Bellara & Bribie Island Shopping Centre | |
| 643 | Bribie Island | Caboolture | Sandstone Point | |
| 644 | Sandstone Point | Bribie Island park 'n' ride | Bribie Island Shopping Centre | |
| 651 | Caboolture | Morayfield | Caboolture North West, Caboolture station & Morayfield Shopping Centre | loop service |
| 652 | Caboolture | Beachmere | | loop service |
| 653 | Caboolture | Morayfield | Bellmere, Caboolture South & Morayfield Shopping Centre | |
| 654 | Morayfield | Caboolture | Morayfield Shopping Centre, Caboolture South & Bellmere | |
| 655 | Caboolture | Caboolture Hospital | Caboolture TAFE and USC campus | loop service |
| 656 | Morayfield | Upper Caboolture | | loop service |
| 657 | Caboolture | Caboolture North | Caboolture PCYC & Pumicestone State School | loop service |

== Fleet ==
As at December 2022, the fleet consisted of 66 buses.
