= Ningi =

Ningi may refer to:

- Cəmiyyət (Ningi), Azerbaijan
- Ningi, Nigeria, a traditional state in northern Nigeria
- Ningi, Queensland, a town in Queensland, Australia
- Ningi, a fictional coin in The Hitchhiker's Guide to the Galaxy
