= Bribie Island Coaches =

Australian bus operator on Bribie Island

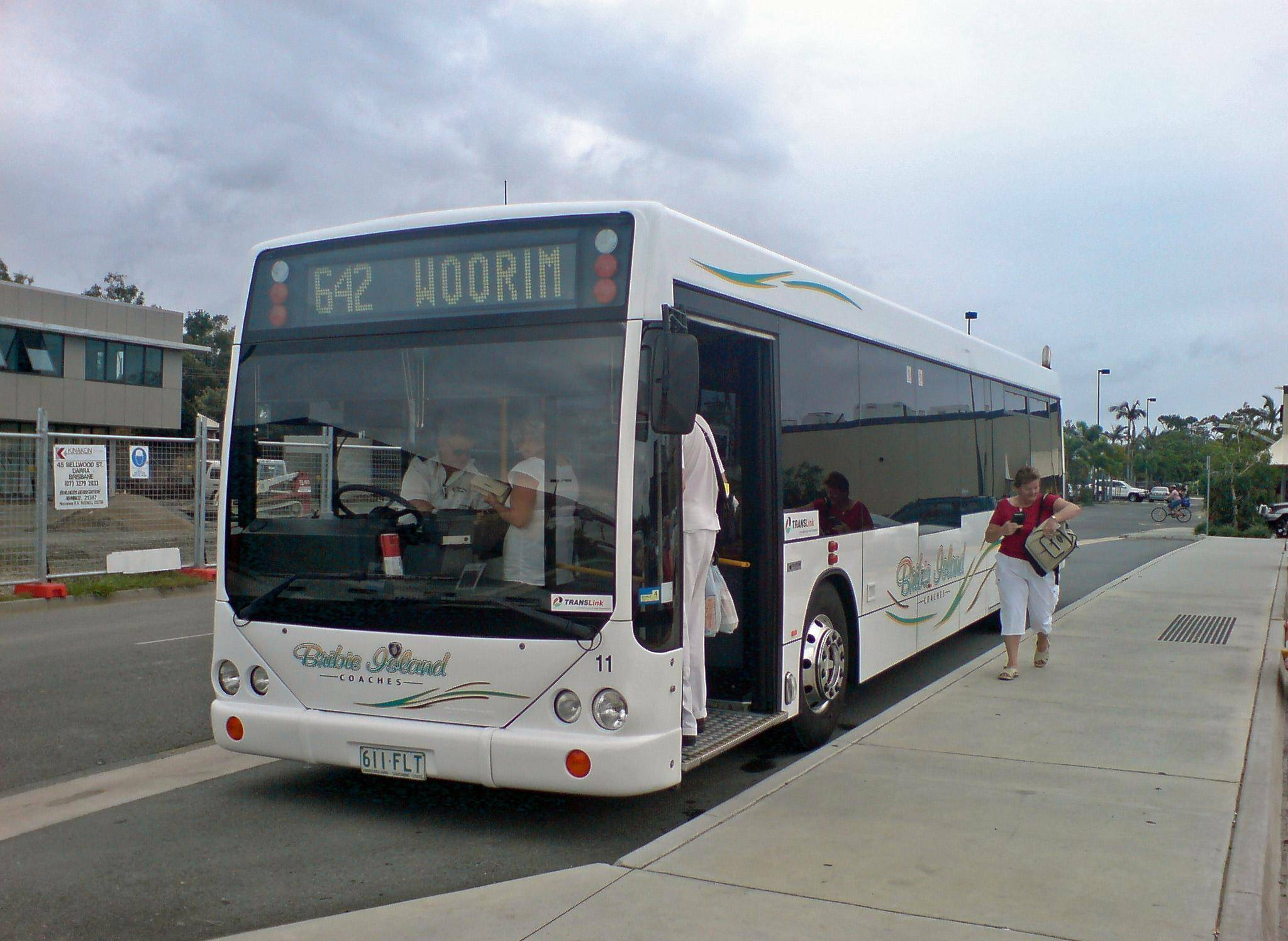
- Custom Coaches bodied Scania L94UB in February 2007
- Parent: Des Trotter
- Ceased operation: July 2020
- Headquarters: Bongaree
- Service area: Bribie Island
- Service type: Bus operator
- Routes: 5
- Depots: 1
- Fleet: 25 (July 2020)
- Website: www.bribiecoaches.com.au

Bribie Island Coaches was an Australian bus operator on Bribie Island. It operated five services under contract to the Government of Queensland under the Translink banner. In July 2020 the business was purchased by Caboolture Bus Lines and the brand retired.

== History ==
Originally owned by Barry Muir and trading as Bribie Island Bus & Coaches, in 1997 the business was sold to former Picton Omnibus Service proprietor George Lee and renamed Bribie Island Coaches. In March 2009 the business was sold to Ballarat operator Des Trotter. In July 2020 the business was sold to Caboolture Bus Lines and the brand retired.

== Services ==
At the time of its cessation, Bribie Island Coaches operated five routes.

Route	From	To	Via
640	Caboolture station	Woorim	Sandstone Point & Bongaree
641	Woorim	Banksia Beach	Bongaree & Bellara
642	Bongaree	Bellara	Bribie Island Shopping Centre
643	Caboolture station	Bribie Island Park & Ride	Sandstone Point
644	Bongaree	Sandstone Point	Bribie Island Shopping Centre

== Fleet ==
As at July 2020, the fleet consisted of 25 buses.
