= Bribie Island Bridge =

Bridge between Bribie Island and Queensland, Australia

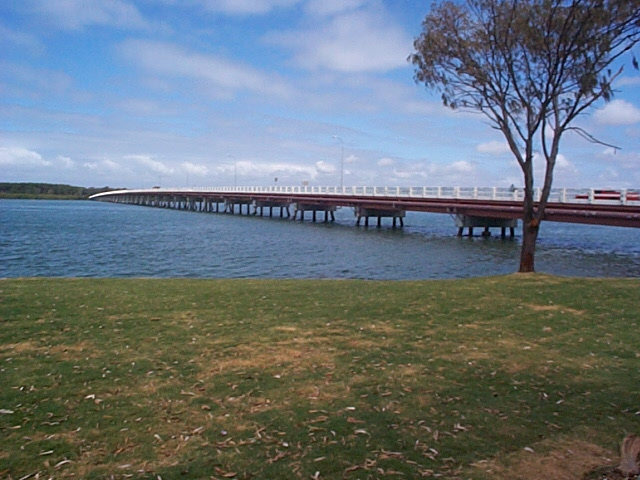
- Bribie Island Bridge
- Carries: Road traffic
- Crosses: Pumicestone Passage
- Locale: Sandstone Point to Bellara / Bongaree on, Bribie Island, Queensland, Australia
- Begins: Sandstone Point
- Ends: Bellara, Bribie Island

Characteristics
- Design: Superstructure: Reinforced concrete deck on prestressed concrete girders, Substructure: Reinforced concrete headstocks on prestressed concrete piles
- Material: Reinforced and prestressed concrete
- Total length: 832 m (2,730 ft)
- Clearance below: 7.3 m (24 ft)
- No. of lanes: 2
- Design life: Built to last until 2031

History
- Constructed by: K.D. Morris
- Construction start: July 1961
- Construction cost: $716,000
- Opened: 19 October 1963

Statistics
- Toll: Abolished in 1975, original cost was $1

Bribie Island Bridge is a concrete bridge in the City of Moreton Bay, Queensland, Australia. It stretches across the Pumicestone Passage, connecting from Sandstone Point on the mainland to Bellara / Bongaree on Bribie Island. It measures approximately 832 metres (2,730 ft) in length.

== History ==
In 1912, there were only 25 residents in Camp Bongaree, Bribie Island. Brisbane Tug & Steamship Co. leased land at the camp, and operated regular trips for visitors from Redcliffe and Brisbane. In the 1930s, tourism at the camp peaked; however, there was no private company road built from Bongaree to Woorim. The road had a toll placed on it, and initially, it had basic truck and bus services as there were few private cars on Bribie Island. Following World War II, barges formerly used for military personnel and transport were purchased by Bribie residents and began operating them as private car ferries.

In 1947, Queensland Premier Edward Hanlon suggested construction of a bridge when development funds were announced. The plan was only brought up again ten years later on November 17, 1957, when Premier Vince Gair spoke about the installation of a possible “Pilot Station”. However, this was moved towards Mooloolaba. In 1958, a proposal was made by developer Alfred Grant Pty. Ltd. to obtain a large parcel of Crown Land on Bribie, in return for building a free bridge. This offer was never accepted. Finally by 1959, the Queensland Government made an official decision to call for tenders for the construction of a bridge to Bribie Island. One year later, a contract was awarded to K.D.Morris to build the bridge with the budget of $716,000.

=== Construction and opening ===
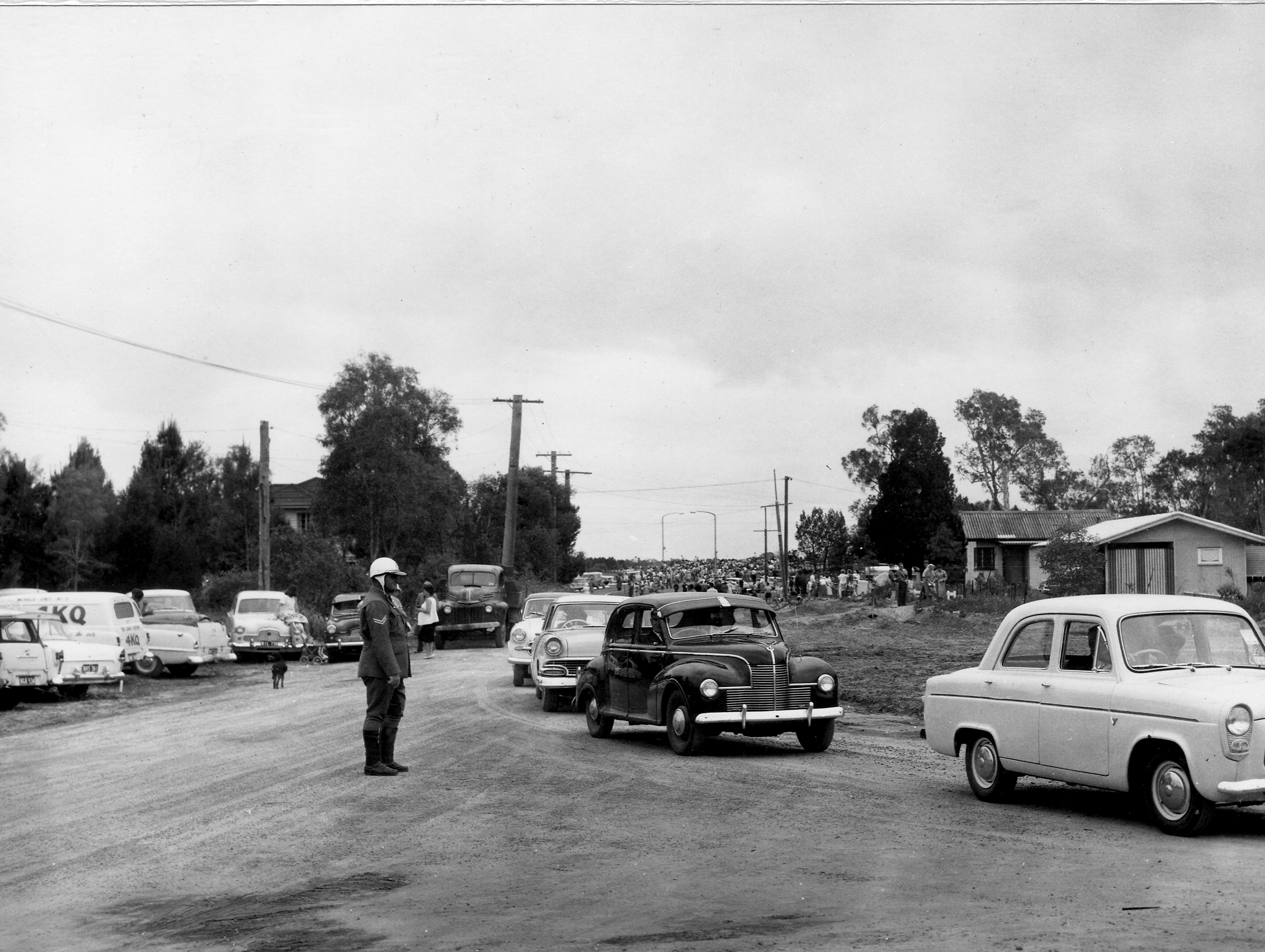
Keeping the Traffic flowing at the opening of Bribie Bridge, 1963

In July 1961, construction on the bridge began and piles were driven into the bed of the channel. There were 206 (25 meters, 82 ft long) prestressed concrete piles installed for the bridge. At the centre of the bridge was a 7.3-meter (24 ft) clearance for small boats during low tide. On 19 October 1963, Bribie Island Bridge was opened by Queensland Premier Frank Nicklin, who also was the first person to pay for a toll, while the toll operator was Jack Greenhalgh. At the time, the bridge was one of the longest concrete bridges in Australia. The population of Bribie at the time was 500 residents, and the car ferry cost was an expensive price of 10 shillings. The bridge toll was $1 (equivalent to $12.50 in 2025), which was considered excessive. This resulted in a public outrage, and the Celebrate Committee was disbanded. Despite the disappointment, in the first week, 14,000 cars paid the toll to cross the bridge. It appeared that the opening event would be boycotted, however, a procession of floats, horse-drawn carts, vintage cars, marching bands, and large crowds drove over the bridge to the island for the first time. Shortly afterwards, residents found out that the infrastructure and amenities such as parking, toilets and street signage were inadequate, and not up to expectations. Because of these factors, residents commonly demanded concessions and reductions. Shortly afterwards, the bridge earned the nickname, the “Ned Kelly Bridge” as it was felt to be highway robbery.

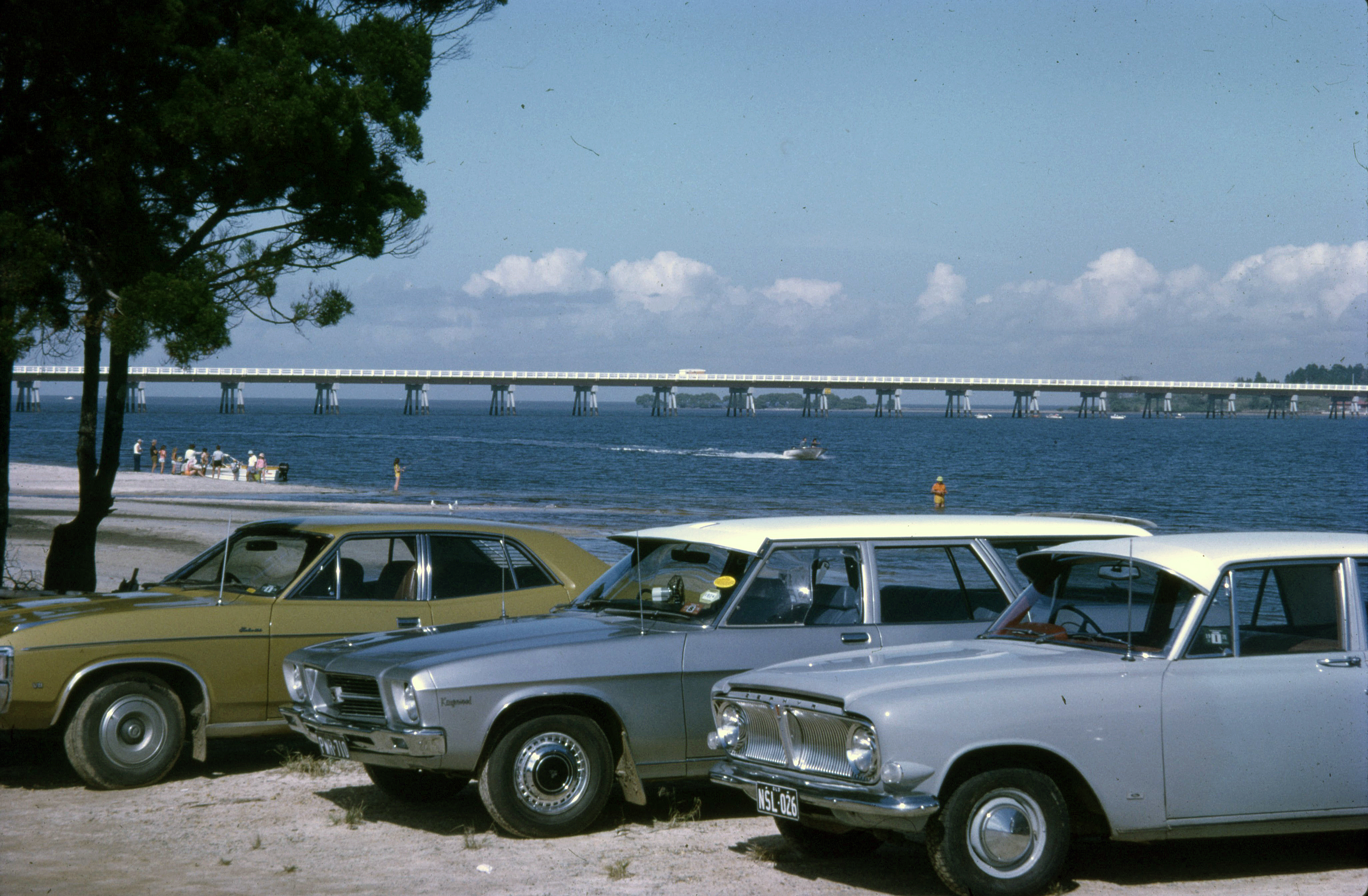
Bribie Island Bridge in 1974.

Finally, in 1975, the Government announced that the bridge had been paid off by the tolls. There were already over 2,000 residents living at Bribie Island at the time of the announcement. On 22 March 1975, the last toll was paid by Bribie resident Stan Balmer, and the bridge has been free of tolls ever since.

== Maintenance ==
In 1997, the Department of Transport and Main Roads inspected the bridge's piers, which resulted in two piles being coated in protective material. Following an independent report in 2013, which conducted underwater studies, more piles in need of protective coating were identified. Eight more piles were jacketed between 2013 and 2020. In 2015, the Labor government ignored advice to undertake remedial maintenance in the bridge's piers, which included jacketing the piles to prevent corrosion and extend the bridge's life past 2038. Bribie Island Bridge's piers are currently coated with a chloride ion resistant coating system comprising Luxepoxy Sealer and Dulux 955 Acrashield. It currently faces corrosive salt-laden winds, which can put the piles at risk of concrete spalling.

== Redevelopment ==
According to an engineering review, the bridge was built to last until 2031. There have been proposals to replace the existing bridge with a 4-lane bridge. However, these plans have been widely rejected due to the high expense associated with demolishing the current bridge. In 2014, a study was made to determine the corridor for a new bridge. The Queensland Department of Transport and Main Roads (TMR) announced that a new $700-million bridge would be constructed beside the bridge, and the existing bridge would be re-used for westbound traffic. The newer bridge will be accommodated with two eastbound lanes, an emergency lane, and also a wider pedestrian walkway. Pelican perches that overhang the water are also expected to be installed on the new bridge. According to Transport and Main Roads Minister Bart Mellish, the traffic will be able to divert between bridges to help manage maintenance and emergencies when necessary. Not only was the bridge involved, but the plan also included the widening of the Caboolture-Bribie road, between Bestmann Road East and Benabrow Avenue to 4 lanes. The Queensland Government will fully fund the project, and has also invested $5.2 million in total. In 2023, community consultation for residents and visitors at Bribie Island was held from January to 27 February.

Mayor Peter Flannery launched a campaign that aimed to turn Bribie Island Bridge into a "green bridge," by converting the existing bridge into a pedestrian and bike friendly walkway with eco-spaces. This would also save the bridge from demolition, and prepare it for the future 2032 Olympics and Paralympics. However, the plan was never finalised in the TMR's current development concepts.

=== Concept ===
The finalised concept by the TMR includes a new two-lane eastbound bridge, and the existing Bribie Island Bridge would be used for westbound traffic. The new eastbound bridge will include road shoulders and a separate transport path. There will be other upgrades such as traffic signals at Sandstone Point Hotel access, pelican perches that hang over water, and a new 4-lane road between Bestmann Road East to Benabrow Avenue.
