= Godwin Beach, Queensland =

Godwin Beach Queensland
- Coordinates: 27.0858°S 153.1013°E
- Population: 487 (2021 census)
  - Density: 128.2/km^{2} (332/sq mi)
- Postcode(s): 4511
- Area: 3.8 km^{2} (1.5 sq mi)
- Time zone: AEST (UTC+10:00)
- Location: 7.4 km (5 mi) W of Bongaree; 18.2 km (11 mi) E of Caboolture; 61.8 km (38 mi) NNE of Brisbane CBD
- LGA(s): City of Moreton Bay
- State electorate(s): Pumicestone
- Federal division(s): Longman
Suburbs around Godwin Beach:
Ningi	Ningi	Sandstone Point
Beachmere	Godwin Beach	Sandstone Point
Beachmere	Moreton Bay	Moreton Bay

Godwin Beach is a coastal rural locality in the City of Moreton Bay, Queensland, Australia. In the 2021 census, Godwin Beach had a population of 487 people.

== Geography ==
The locality is bounded to the south and south-east by Deception Bay, a side bay of Moreton Bay. There is a narrow sandy beach, also called Godwin Beach, along the residential areas near The Esplanade in the south-east of the locality, but otherwise the coastline is a mangrove forest.

The land use in the locality is mixed. In the west and south-west of the locality are reservoirs and mangrove wetlands. There is grazing on native vegetation in the centre of the locality. The north parts of the locality is rural residential housing with larger land parcels, while the area near The Esplanade is also residential but with smaller suburban lots.

== History ==
The locality is named after Charles Godwin who owned a fish cannery by the beach from 1897 to 1907. In January 1911 the steamer Eastern was stranded on the Salamander Bank (27.067°S 153.317°E), 2.5 miles (4.0 km) north-west of Bulwer on Moreton Island, and barrels of oil had drifted off into the sea. Godwin was employed to salvage these barrels and transport them to Brisbane. While doing so, on 20 February 1911 he was thrown from his boat in rough seas off Toorbul Point and he drowned.

Beachmere Kingdom Hall of Jehovah's Witnesses was built in 1992.

Circa 1999, a monument commemorating Godwin was erected on the beachfront.

== Demographics ==
In the 2011 census, Godwin Beach recorded a population of 444 people, 49.1% female and 50.9% male. The median age of the Godwin Beach population was 41 years, 4 years above the national median of 37. 77.3% of people living in Godwin Beach were born in Australia. The other top responses for country of birth were England 7%, New Zealand 5.4%, Cambodia 0.7%, Hong Kong 0.7%, Germany 0.7%. 92.3% of people spoke only English at home; the next most common languages were 1.1% Thai, 0.9% Tagalog, 0.9% German, 0.9% Greek, 0% Gaelic (Scotland).

In the 2016 census, Godwin Beach had a population of 462 people.

In the 2021 census, Godwin Beach had a population of 487 people.

== Education ==
There are no schools in Godwin Beach. The nearest government primary and secondary schools are Bribie Island State School and Bribie Island State High School, both in Bongaree on Bribie Island to the east.

== Amenities ==
Godwin Beach Esplanade Park provides beach access, play equipment, barbeque and fitness equipment (27.08553°S 153.113682°E).

The Beachmere Kingdom Hall of Jehovah's Witnesses is at 470 Bestmann Road (27.078994°S 153.102°E).

== Attractions ==
There is a memorial to Charles Godwin along the beachfront.
