= Nngi =

Nngi / Jamiyyat Ննգի / Cəmiyyət
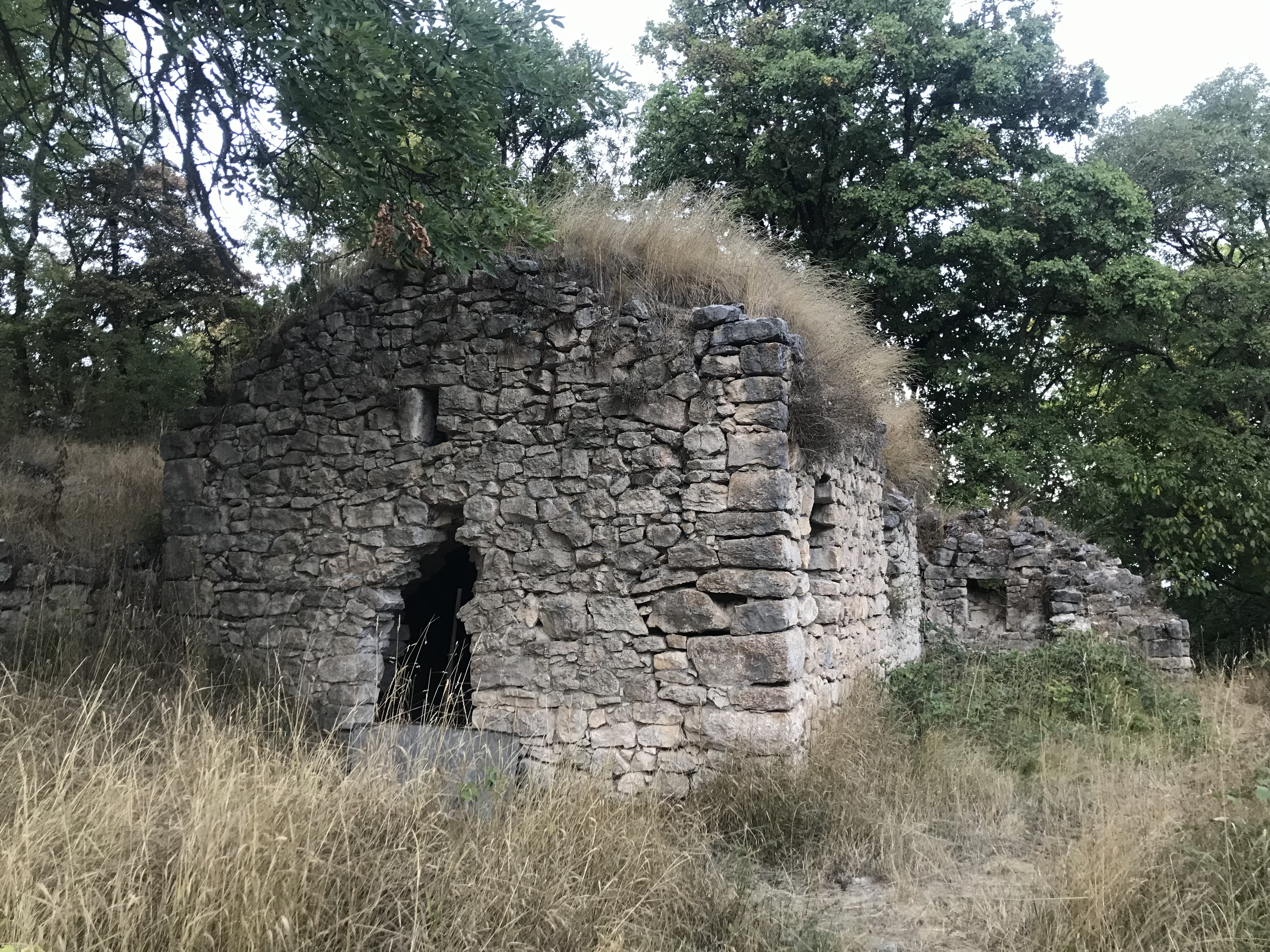
- The Bovurkhan Monastery near Nngi

- Location within Azerbaijan Location within Karabakh Economic Region
- Coordinates: 39°47′38″N 46°53′16″E
- Country: Azerbaijan
  - District: Khojavend

Population (2015)
  - Total: 334
- Time zone: UTC+4 (AZT)

Nngi (Armenian: Ննգի) or Jamiyyat (Azerbaijani: Cəmiyyət) is a village located in the Khojavend District of Azerbaijan, in the region of Nagorno-Karabakh. Until 2023 it was controlled by the breakaway Republic of Artsakh. The village had an ethnic Armenian-majority population until the expulsion of the Armenian population of Nagorno-Karabakh by Azerbaijan following the 2023 Azerbaijani offensive in Nagorno-Karabakh.

== History ==
During the Soviet period, the village was a part of the Martuni District of the Nagorno-Karabakh Autonomous Oblast.

== Historical heritage sites ==
Historical heritage sites in and around the village include the monastery complex of Bovurkhan (Armenian: Բովուրխան), a village from between the 11th and 17th centuries, and the church of Surb Astvatsatsin (Armenian: Սուրբ Աստվածածին, lit. 'Holy Mother of God') built in 1895.

== Economy and culture ==
The population is mainly engaged in agriculture and animal husbandry. As of 2015, the village has a municipal building, a house of culture, a secondary school, and a medical centre.

== Demographics ==
The village had 374 inhabitants in 2005, and 334 inhabitants in 2015.
