= Beachmere, Queensland =

Beachmere
- Town
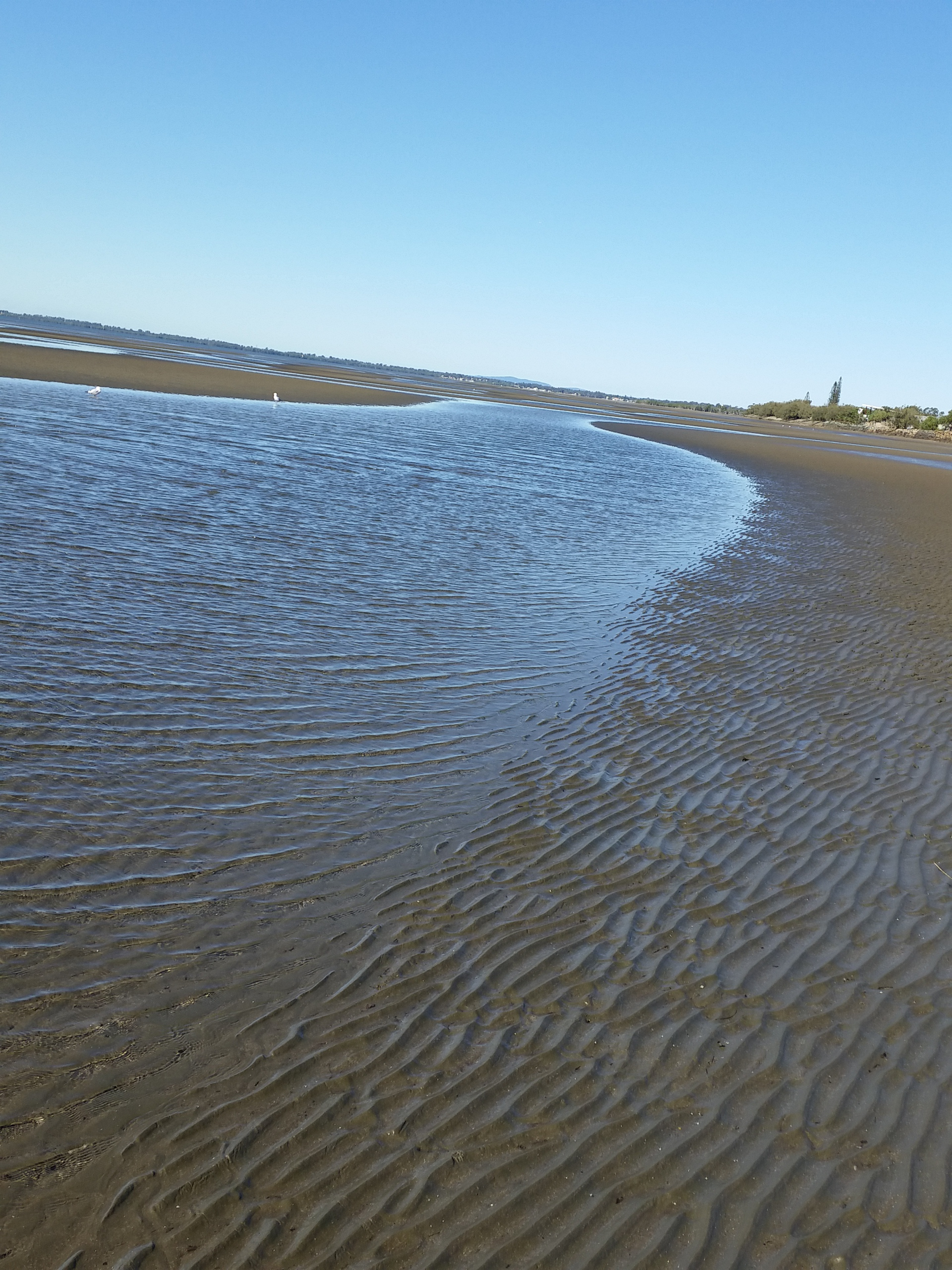
- Beachmere, Moreton Bay, with the tide out

- Interactive map of Beachmere
- Coordinates: 27.1294°S 153.0538°E
- Country: Australia
- State: Queensland
- City: Moreton Bay
- LGA: City of Moreton Bay
- Location: 12.1 km (7.5 mi) SE of Caboolture; 59.4 km (36.9 mi) NNE of Brisbane CBD

Government
  - State electorate: Pumicestone
  - Federal division: Longman

Area
  - Total: 30.2 km^{2} (11.7 sq mi)
- Elevation: 0 to 4 m (0 to 13 ft)

Population
  - Total: 4,782 (2021 census)
  - Density: 158.34/km^{2} (410.1/sq mi)
- Time zone: UTC+10:00 (AEST)
- Postcode: 4510
Localities around Beachmere
Caboolture	Ningi	Godwin Beach
Morayfield	Beachmere	Moreton Bay
Burpengary East	Burpengary East	Moreton Bay

Beachmere is a coastal rural town and locality in the City of Moreton Bay, Queensland, Australia. It is located north of Brisbane, the state capital of Queensland. In the 2021 census, the locality of Beachmere had a population of 4,782 people.

== Geography ==
The suburb is bounded to the east by Deception Bay, a side bay of Moreton Bay. The Caboolture River forms the south-western boundary of the locality, flowing into Deception Bay at the locality's most southerly point. The town is on the south-east coast of the locality. The locality is low-lying, less than 5 metres (16 ft) above sea level.

Road access to Beachmere is via Beachmere Road which commences at Bribie Island Road at Caboolture and continues south-east to the town of the Beachmere.

The land use along the coast is predominantly suburban housing in the town of Beachmere with larger blocks in the rural residential areas elsewhere along the coast and near Beachmere Road. Apart from the residential areas, the land use is a mixture of grazing on native vegetation and wetlands (reflecting the low-lying nature of the suburb).

== History ==
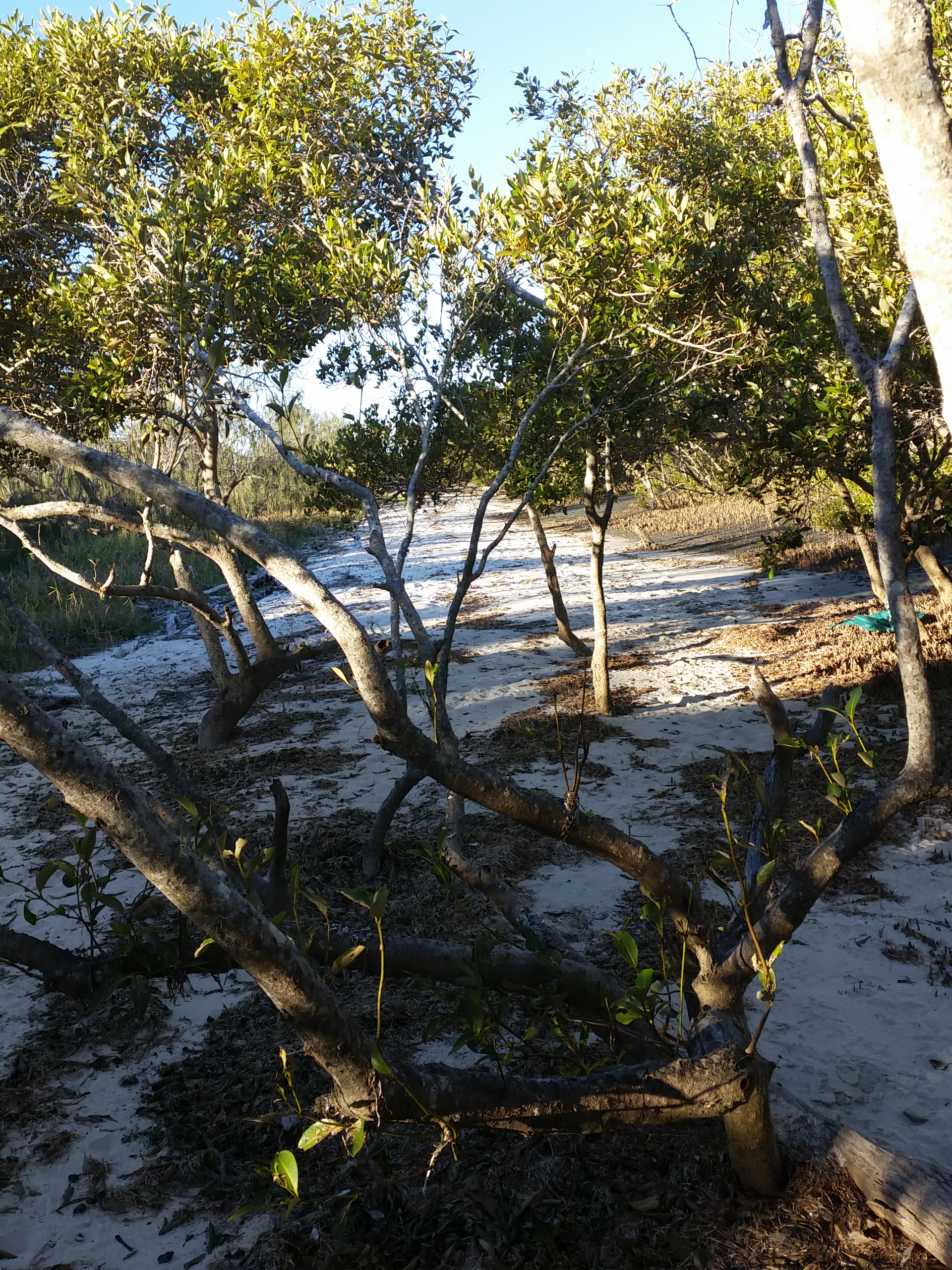
The sandy beach among the mangroves

=== Indigenous history ===
The area now known as Beachmere is part of the traditional lands of the Kabi Kabi (also spelt Gubbi Gubbi) People who maintained deep cultural, spiritual, and economic connections to the coastal landscape for thousands of years. The estuarine waters and wetlands provided abundant food and other resources, and formed part of a broader network of movement, settlement, and cultural practice.

The Beachmere Midden Complex stretches through the region and contains extensive shell middens from generations of traditional harvesting.

=== Colonial contact ===
The expansion of European pastoralism into the area during the 1840s and 1850s triggered a period of intense frontier conflict across the Caboolture region. As Europeans claimed and privatised vital traditional land and waterways, Kabi Kabi people defended against the invasion. This formed part of a major coordinated regional First Nations defence along the Caboolture River. The European colonial response was highly punitive; the Queensland Native Police force, carried out violent incursions across the district.

By the time the first known European inhabitant, Thomas Edwin Bonney, established his permanent residence in the area in 1870, decades of conflict, frontier massacres, and introduced diseases had severely decimated the local Indigenous population. Progressive dispossession accelerated through the late 19th century as the Queensland Government introduced protectionist policies to facilitate the forced removal of surviving Kabi Kabi people from their lands. Many were systematically relocated to government-run reserves and Christian missions, initially to locations like Bribie Island and the Durundur Reserve near Woodford, before being forcibly moved further away to Barambah (now Cherbourg) after 1905.

=== Beachmere name origin ===
The origin of the locality name is thought to be from Bonney's residence, he called Beachmere. It is thought to be a portmanteau of 'beach' and 'mere', a common British suffix to place names meaning marshy ground.

== Demographics ==
In the 2016 census, Beachmere recorded a population of 4,112 people, 50.6% female and 49.4% male. The median age of the Beachmere population was 50 years, compared to the national median age of 38. 76.8% of people living in Beachmere were born in Australia. The other top responses for country of birth were England 6.6%, New Zealand 3.9%, Philippines 0.7%, Germany 0.6%. 91.9% of people spoke only English at home; the next most common languages were 0.3% Italian, 0.2% German, 0.2% Spanish.

In the 2021 census, Beachmere recorded a population of 4,782 people, 50.8% female and 49.2% male. The median age of the Beachmere population was 57 years, compared to the national median age of 38. 75.6% of people living in Beachmere were born in Australia and 92.4% of people spoke only English at home.

== Education ==
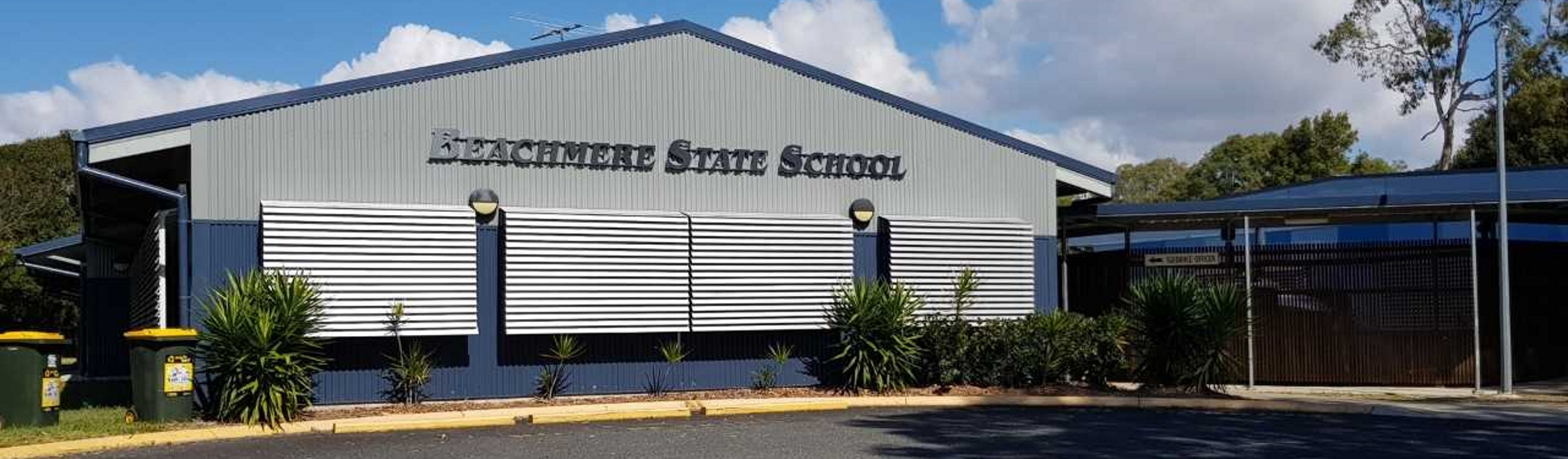
Beachmere State School

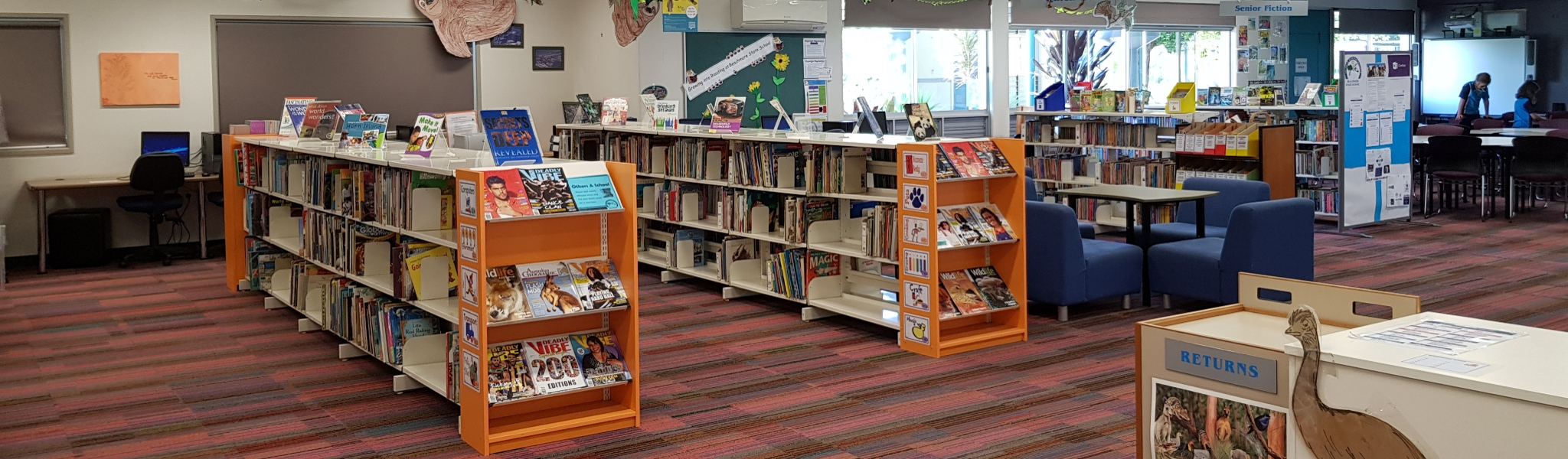
Library, Beachmere State School

Opened on 28 January 1986, Beachmere State School is a co-educational government primary (Prep-6) school at 24-58 James Road (27.1315°S 153.0476°E). In 2017, the school had an enrolment of 306 students with 27 teachers (20 full-time equivalent) and 20 non-teaching staff (13 full-time equivalent). It includes a special education program.

Opened on 15 April 2013, Birali Steiner School is a private, co-educational primary (Prep-7) school at 670 Beachmere Road (corner Newman Road, 27.1298°S 153.0509°E). In 2017, the school had an enrolment of 32 students with 4 teachers and 5 non-teaching staff (2 full-time equivalent).

There are no secondary schools in Beachmere. The nearest government secondary school is Caboolture State High School in neighbouring Caboolture to the west.

== Amenities ==
The Moreton Bay City Council operates a mobile library service which visits Clayton Park on the corner of Biggs Avenue and Main Street (27.1296°S 153.0539°E).

Beachmere Uniting Church is on the corner of Moreton Terrace and Second Avenue (27.1329°S 153.0498°E).

Beachmere Bowls Club is at 5 Progress Avenue (27.1298°S 153.0527°E).

There are two boat ramps with a floating walkway on Saint Smith Road on the north bank of the Caboolture River (27.1449°S 153.0363°E). It is managed by the Moreton Bay Regional Council.
