= Sandstone Point, Queensland =

Sandstone Point Queensland
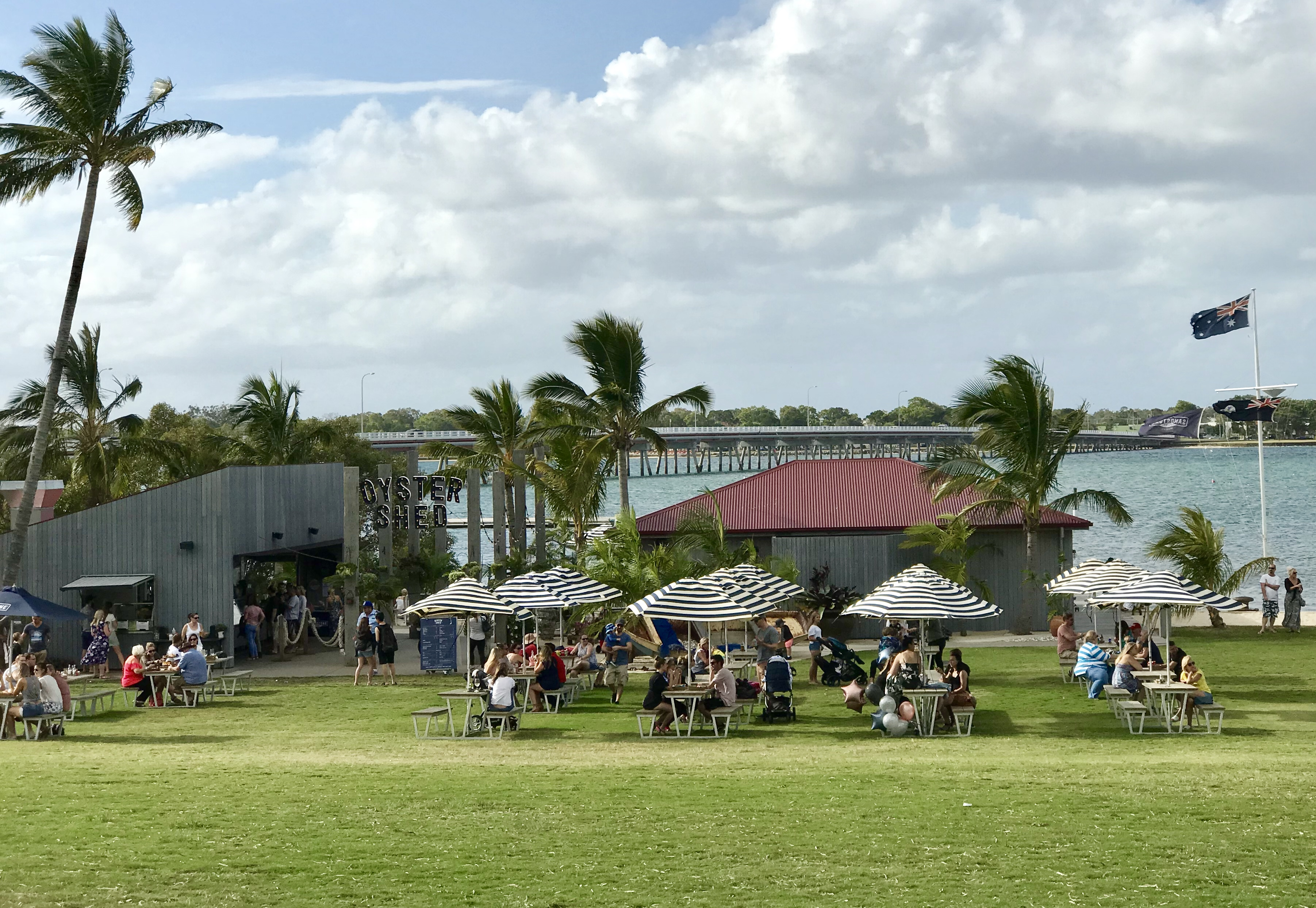
- Sandstone Point with Bribie Island Bridge, 2018

- Coordinates: 27.0736°S 153.1233°E
- Population: 4,094 (2021 census)
  - Density: 413.5/km^{2} (1,071/sq mi)
- Postcode(s): 4511
- Area: 9.9 km^{2} (3.8 sq mi)
- Time zone: AEST (UTC+10:00)
- Location: 5.1 km (3 mi) W of Bongaree; 20.4 km (13 mi) E of Caboolture; 79.8 km (50 mi) NNE of Brisbane CBD
- LGA(s): City of Moreton Bay
- State electorate(s): Pumicestone
- Federal division(s): Longman
Suburbs around Sandstone Point:
Toorbul	Banksia Beach	Bellara
Ningi	Sandstone Point	Bongaree
Goodwin Beach	Moreton Bay	Moreton Bay

Sandstone Point is a coastal locality in the City of Moreton Bay, Queensland, Australia. In the 2021 census, Sandstone Point had a population of 4,094 people.

== Geography ==
Sandstone Point is approximately 52 kilometres (32 mi) north of Brisbane, located on Caboolture–Bribie Island Road, across the Bribie Island Bridge (27.0709°S 153.1450°E) from Bribie Island and has views of Moreton Bay and surroundings. The locality is one of the fastest growing residential communities in the Moreton Bay Region.

Sandstone Point has the following coastal features:

- Turners Camp Island, now connected to the mainland (27.0638°S 153.1269°E)
- Toorbul Point (27.0756°S 153.1440°E)
- Sandstone Point (27.0868°S 153.1300°E)
- Godwin Beach, a beach which extends from neighbouring locality of Godwin Beach to the south-west (27.0885°S 153.1096°E)

Off-shore are a number of marine waterbodies:

- Pumicestone Channel, to the west, separating Bribie Island from the mainland (27.0661°S 153.1393°E)
- Deception Bay to the south (27.1023°S 153.1238°E)
- Moreton Bay, also known as Quandamook, to the south-east (27.1075°S 153.1568°E)

== History ==
The locality is built on the traditional lands of the Ningy Ningy people, whose presence was attested down to recent times by the ceremonial bora ring south of Bestman Road. Upwards of 2,000 Aboriginal people once gathered there for ritual purposes.

Once known as Toorbul Point, the area was the site of an allied amphibious training base during World War II.

== Demographics ==
In the 2011 census, Sandstone Point has a population of 3,895 people, 52.8% female and 47.2% male. The median age of the Sandstone Point population was 51 years, 14 years above the national median of 37. 76.8% of people living in Sandstone Point were born in Australia. The other top responses for country of birth were England 7.6%, New Zealand 4.2%, Scotland 1%, Germany 0.7%, Netherlands 0.6%. 94.2% of people spoke only English at home; the next most common languages were 0.4% Dutch, 0.3% Afrikaans, 0.3% German, 0.3% Spanish, 0.2% French.

In the 2016 census, Sandstone Point had a population of 3,959 people.

In the 2021 census, Sandstone Point had a population of 4,094 people.

== Education ==
There are no schools in Sandstone Point. The nearest government primary and secondary schools are Bribie Island State School and Bribie Island State High School, both in Bongaree on Bribie Island across the bridge to the east.

== Amenities ==
The Village Sandstone Point is a shopping centre at 208 Bestmann Road East (27.0797°S 153.1261°E). Its anchor tenant is an IGA supermarket.

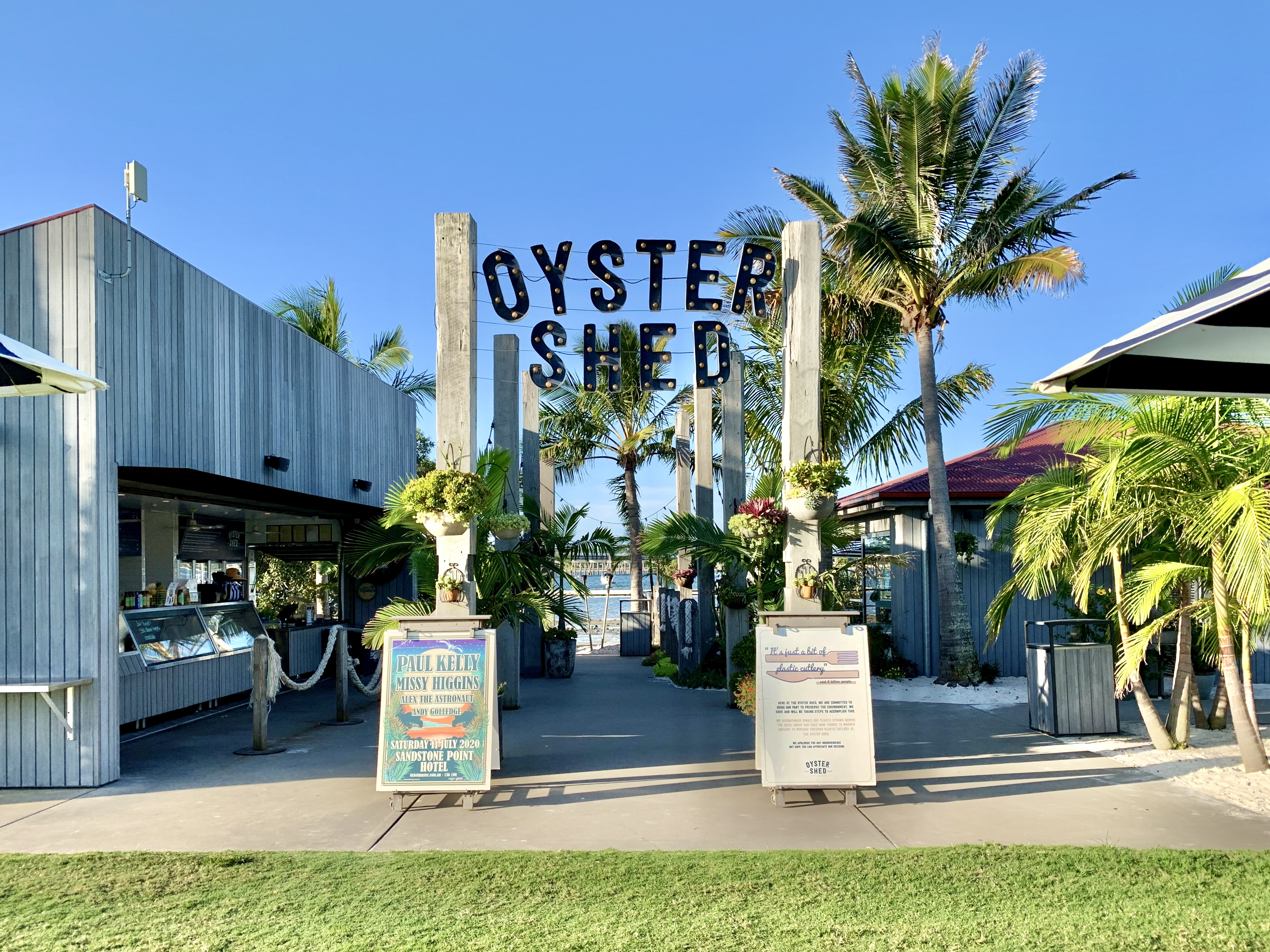
Oyster Shed at Sandstone Point Hotel, 2020

Sandstone Point Hotel is at 1800 Bribie Island Road (27.0754°S 153.1430°E).

Sparrow Early Learning is an Early Childhood Service at 53 Bestmann Road East.

Pebble Beach Retirement Community is a retirement village at 210-232 Bestmann Road East (27.0792°S 153.1251°E), immediately west of the shopping centre.

Spinnaker Sound Marina is a 3.1-hectare (7.7-acre) marina (27.0700°S 153.1347°E). There is a boat ramp at the marina (27.0693°S 153.1340°E).

Kal Ma Kuta Drive boat ramp is north of the marina and provides access into the Pumicestone Passage (27.0672°S 153.1337°E). It is managed by the Moreton Bay Regional Council.

There are a number of parks in the area:

- Pebble Beach Common (27.0793°S 153.1281°E)
- Spinnaker Park (27.0661°S 153.1305°E)
