= Ningi, Queensland =

Ningi Queensland
- Coordinates: 27.0672°S 153.1047°E
- Population: 5,349 (2021 census)
  - Density: 177.12/km^{2} (458.7/sq mi)
- Postcode(s): 4511
- Area: 30.2 km^{2} (11.7 sq mi)
- Time zone: AEST (UTC+10:00)
- Location: 10.8 km (7 mi) W of Bongaree; 14.4 km (9 mi) E of Caboolture; 57.9 km (36 mi) NNE of Brisbane CBD
- LGA(s): City of Moreton Bay
- State electorate(s): Pumicestone
- Federal division(s): Longman
Localities around Ningi:
Toorbul	Toorbul	Toorbul
Caboolture	Ningi	Sandstone Point
Beachmere	Beachmere	Godwin Beach

Ningi is a town and locality in the City of Moreton Bay, Queensland, Australia. In the 2021 census, the locality of Ningi had a population of 5,349 people. It is near Caboolture.

== Geography ==
The northern boundary is aligned with Ningi Creek. Ningi Island is located in the north east where the Creek enters Pumicestone Passage. Ningi Creek Conservation Park has been established in the west of Ningi.

The main township of Ningi is located on Caboolture–Bribie Island Road. At the northern area of Ningi is a housing estate called Bribie Pines, with larger parcels of land and already established houses. There is a growing younger population of residents. Specifically younger families with school aged children who have relocated from built up areas. There are two other housing estates in the area: Grey Gums Estate located on the road out to Godwin Beach, and the newly developed Sandstone Lakes. It is surrounded by developments ranging from acreage to half acre blocks many of which are classified as rural residential as well as rural properties and state forests.

== History ==
The origin of the suburb's name is from the Aboriginal Undanbi clan, the Ningi Ningi, whose name meant oysters.

In 1998 a vacuum sewerage system was installed by the Caboolture Shire Council (now a part of the Moreton Bay City Council) to replace the septic systems originally used.

== Demographics ==
In the 2011 census, the locality of Ningi had a population of 3,687 people, 50.2% female and 49.8% male. The median age of the Ningi population was 37 years, the same as the national median. 76.4% of people living in Ningi were born in Australia. The other top responses for country of birth were England 5.7%, New Zealand 4.2%, Scotland 0.8%, Germany 0.6%, Papua New Guinea 0.5%. 90.9% of people spoke only English at home; the next most common languages were 0.3% Italian, 0.2% Afrikaans, 0.2% Dutch, 0.2% Mandarin, 0.2% Spanish.

In the 2016 census, the locality of Ningi had a population of 4,675 people.

In the 2021 census, the locality of Ningi had a population of 5,349 people.

== Education ==
There are no schools in Ningi. The nearest government primary schools are Caboolture East State School in neighbouring Caboolture to the west, Beachmere State School in neighbouring Beachmere to the south, and Bribie Island State School in Bongaree on Bribie Island to the east. The nearest government secondary schools are Caboolture State High School in neighbouring Caboolture to the west and Bribie Island State High School in Bongaree on Bribie Island to the east.

== Amenities ==
Theo Greene Park is at 1320 Bribie Island Road (27.0664°S 153.0995°E). It features barbecue and picnic facilities, playground equipment, and a half basketball court.

Ningi Community Hall is adjacent to Theo Greene Park (27.0662°S 153.0989°E). It is available for rental from the Ningi Community Hall Association on behalf of the council.

== Attractions ==
Ningi has a medieval festival, WWII bunkers and an Aboriginal Bora ring.
