= Operation Ring =

Ethnic cleansing of Armenians committed by Soviet and Soviet Azerbaijani forces

- Part of Nagorno-Karabakh conflict, First Nagorno-Karabakh war, and Dissolution of the Soviet Union
Date	30 April – 15 May 1991
Location	Khanlar and Shahumyan districts of Azerbaijan; Shusha, Mardakert and Hadrut districts of Nagorno-Karabakh; Noyemberyan, Goris, Ijevan and Shamshadin districts of Armenia.
Result	Azerbaijani-Soviet victory: Deportation of at least 5,000 Armenians from the region

Belligerents
(Armenia) Armenian militants Armenian Revolutionary Federation	Soviet Union: Azerbaijan

Commanders and leaders
(Armenia) Tatul Krpeyan † (Armenia) Simon Achikgyozyan †	(Azerbaijan Soviet Socialist Republic) Ayaz Mutallibov (Soviet Union) Viktor Polyanichko (Soviet Union) Vladislav Safonov

Units involved
	Soviet Army: Soviet 4th Army; 23rd Guards Motor Rifle Division; Ministry of Internal Affairs of the USSR (MVD): MVD Internal Troops; MVD spetsnaz company; Ministry of Internal Affairs of the Republic of Azerbaijan: OMON of the Republic of Azerbaijan

Strength
Unknown	Unknown

Casualties and losses
Unknown; civilian deaths, including ethnic Armenian police force, estimated to be 30–50; 5,000 deported from Shahumyan region	Unknown

Operation Ring (Russian: Операция «Кольцо», romanized: Operatsia Kol'tso; Armenian: «Օղակ» գործողություն, Oghak gortsoghut'yun), known in Azerbaijan as Operation Chaykand (Azerbaijani: Çaykənd əməliyyatı) was the codename for the May 1991 military operation conducted by the Soviet Army, Internal Troops of the Ministry of Internal Affairs (MVD) of the USSR and OMON units of the Azerbaijan SSR in the Khanlar and Shahumyan districts of the Azerbaijani SSR, the Shusha, Martakert and Hadrut districts of the Nagorno-Karabakh Autonomous Oblast, and along the eastern border of the Armenian SSR in the districts of Goris, Noyemberyan, Ijevan and Shamshadin. Officially dubbed a "passport checking operation," the ostensible goal of the operation was to disarm "illegal armed formations" in and around Nagorno-Karabakh, referring to irregular Armenian military detachments that had been operating in the area. The operation involved the use of ground troops accompanied by a complement of military vehicles, artillery and helicopter gunships to be used to root out the self-described Armenian fedayeen.

However, contrary to their stated objectives, Soviet troops and the predominantly Azerbaijani soldiers in the AzSSR OMON and army forcibly uprooted Armenians living in the 24 villages strewn across Shahumyan to leave their homes and settle elsewhere in Nagorno-Karabakh or in the neighbouring Armenian SSR. Following this, the Armenian inhabitants of 17 villages across the Shusha and Hadrut regions were forcibly removed. Border villages in the Armenian SSR were also raided. British journalist Thomas de Waal has described Operation Ring as the Soviet Union's first and only civil war and as the "beginning of the open, armed phase of the Karabakh conflict." Some authors have also described the actions of the joint Soviet and Azerbaijani force as ethnic cleansing. The military operation was accompanied by systematic and gross human rights abuses.

== Background ==
The Nagorno-Karabakh movement which had originally begun in Nagorno-Karabakh and Armenia in the late 1980s called for the Armenian-majority Nagorno-Karabakh Autonomous Oblast of the Azerbaijan SSR to be united with Armenia. Official petitions were sent by Armenian leaders to the Soviet government in Moscow in order to address the issue but were rejected by General Secretary Mikhail Gorbachev. The demands to transfer the region came in the middle of Gorbachev's reform policies, Glasnost and Perestroika. First implemented in 1985, when Gorbachev came into power, the liberalization of political and economical constraints in the Soviet Union gave birth to numerous nationalist groups in the different Soviet republics who insisted that they be given the right to secede and form their own independent countries.

By late 1989, the Communist Parties of the republics of Armenia, Azerbaijan, Georgia, Estonia, Latvia and Lithuania had largely been weakened in power. In Nagorno-Karabakh, as well as in Armenia and the rest of Azerbaijan, intercommunal relations between Armenians and Azerbaijanis had worsened due to violence and pogroms, which caused a mass flight of Armenians from Azerbaijan and Azerbaijanis from Armenia. Gorbachev's policies hastened the collapse of the Soviet system and many Armenians and Azerbaijanis sought protection by arming themselves with Soviet military weaponry. His preoccupation in dealing with the numerous demands by the other republics saw the disappearance of vast amounts of assault rifles, rocket-propelled grenades, and other small arms munitions stored in caches throughout Armenia and Azerbaijan.

Foreseeing the inevitable conflict that would unfold after the Soviet Union disintegrated, Armenian volunteers from both the republic and the Armenian diaspora flocked to the enclave and formed detachments consisting of several dozen men each. Gorbachev deemed these detachments and others in Karabakh as illegal entities and banned them in a decree in July 1990. Despite this promulgation, these groups continued to exist and actively fought against Azerbaijani special-purpose militia brigades, or OMON (Otryad Militsii Osobogo Naznacheniya, also known as the "black berets"). The volatility of the attacks led the Soviet government to position military units in the Armenian capital of Yerevan and along the five-kilometre (3 mile) gap between the Armenian border and Nagorno-Karabakh.

Shahumyan (also spelled Shaumian, now the southern part of the Goranboy District of Azerbaijan), which lies directly to the north of Nagorno-Karabakh, had a population of about 20,000, of which 85 percent was ethnic Armenian. The neighboring Khanlar District (since renamed Goygol) had a sizable Armenian minority. While the Armenian volunteers pledged to defend and protect civilians living in Shahumyan from Azerbaijani incursions, many of them were told to stay away by the inhabitants themselves to save the villages and the entire district from violence.

== Origins and planning ==
An article on the operation appearing in the 12 May Event Commentary section of Moskovskiye Novosti

It is widely believed that Operation Ring was conceived by Soviet authorities in order to intimidate the Armenian populace. The Armenian SSR had boycotted the All-Union referendum, though Armenian sources alleged that Baku had planned measures against the Armenians long before the referendum. Although the execution of Operation Ring was not proposed to Soviet officials until mid-April 1991, Mutalibov insisted in an interview that such plans had originally been formulated as early as 1989.

Viktor Krivopuskov, who visited Karabakh in 1990, writes:

Early in November 1990 our fact-finding group got hold of secret materials of the authorities of the Azerbaijan SSR on the total deportation of the Armenian population from the villages of Khanlar and of former Shahumyan regions. At the session of the Supreme Council of Azerbaijan SSR, which took place in February 1991, the plan of deportations of the Armenian population from Azerbaijan was actually approved.

The Russian human rights organization Memorial reports the expulsion of civilians in this region as early as 1989–90, when the inhabitants of the villages Kushi-Armavir, Azat, and Kamo were forced to abandon their homes. The Azerbaijani OMON had similarly been engaged in various "acts of harassment against Armenian villages in the enclave, including raids on collective farms and the destruction of... communal facilities."

In 1991, Gorbachev set 17 March as the date of the All-Union referendum that the republics would take part in to decide the fate of the Soviet Union. Although the new union proposed in the referendum would grant greater autonomy to the individual republics, Armenia, Georgia and several other republics vowed not to take part in the referendum and instead seek independence from Moscow. Meanwhile, Azerbaijan's Communist Party head, Ayaz Mutalibov, continued to support Gorbachev's attempts to keep the Union together. Azerbaijan took part in the referendum; with 92 percent of voters agreeing to remain a part of the Soviet Union. Mutalibov's staunch loyalty to Gorbachev allowed him to garner backing from Moscow and, in effect, he now had the support to discourage the aspirations of Armenians desiring to unite with Armenia or to force them to leave the region altogether. Viktor Polyanichko, Mutalibov's deputy and the Second Secretary of the Azerbaijan Communist Party, planned the operation.

The operation's codename, Ring, referred to the encirclement of the villages of Getashen (now Chaykand) and Martunashen (now Garabulag) by the Soviet MVD and armed forces. A date in late April was chosen for the commencement of the operation, which called for Soviet troops to surround the villages and search for illegally procured weapons and Armenian guerrilla fighters. Reacting to the growing violence, Gorbachev had also assigned units of the Soviet 4th Army's predominantly Azerbaijani 23rd Motorized Rifle Division, stationed along the Armenian-Azerbaijani border, to serve as a buffer force. The 23rd Division and other elements of the Fourth Army were selected along with the Azerbaijani OMON to take part in Ring.

== Implementation ==
=== First operation ===
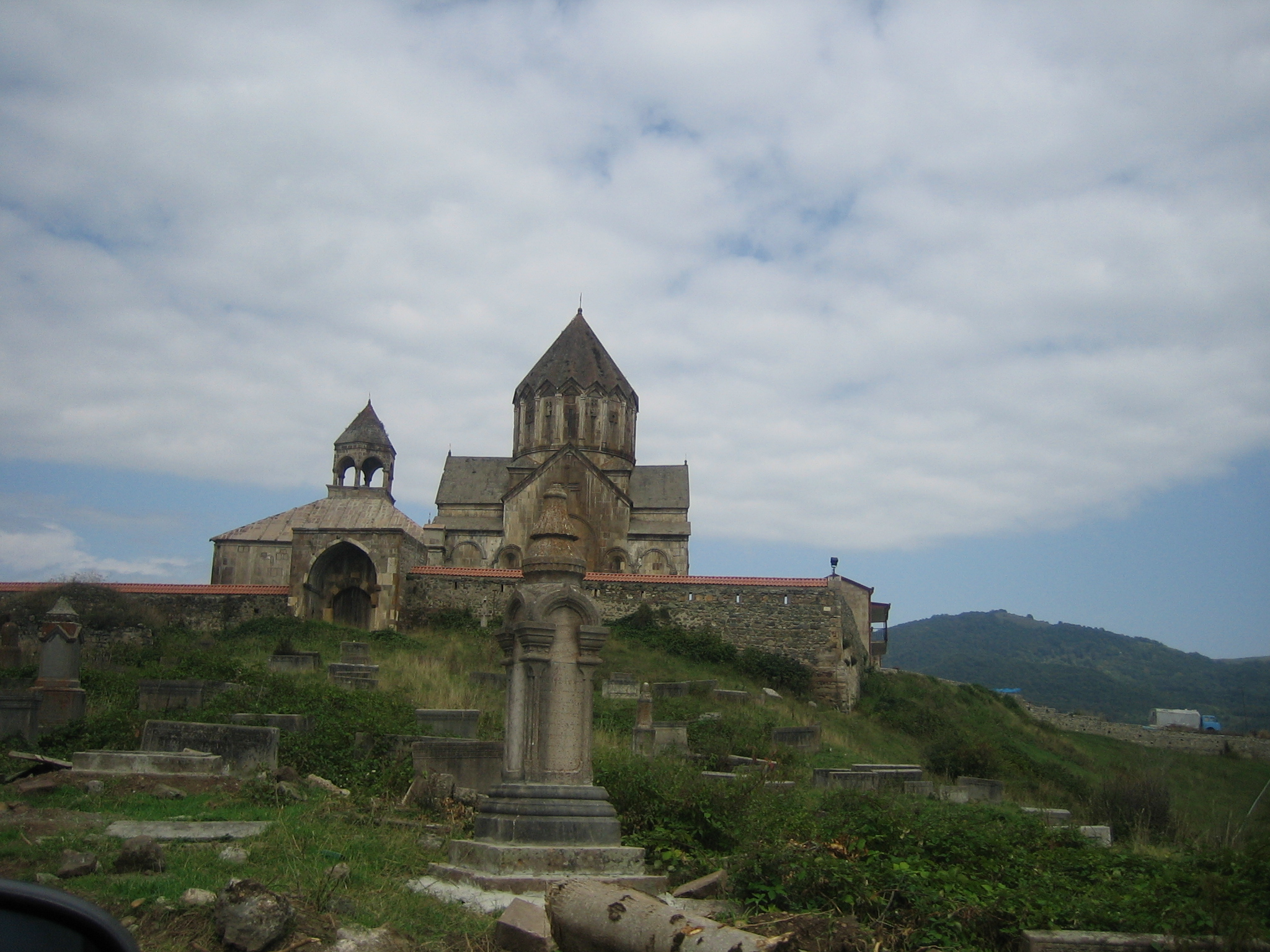
The monastery at Gandzasar

On 30 April, the Soviet troops and OMON converged toward Getashen and Martunashen, which were located approximately twenty-five kilometres (15 miles) north of Nagorno-Karabakh in the Khanlar District of the Azerbaijan SSR, meeting little, if any, resistance on the way. Accompanying the normal ground troops were an assortment of tanks, armoured personnel carriers, artillery and attack helicopters. While approaching the villages in Shahumyan, the military would announce their intended actions with a loudspeaker and called for the inhabitants to display proof of their citizenship (known as a "passport-regime" check) in an effort to root out the fedayeen groups led by Tatul Krpeyan, a local schoolteacher from Armenia proper. The following ultimatum was issued to residents in a village in Shahumyan:

Within one hour, all citizens of this village will be required to go through a passport regime. Comrade citizens, we implore you to show no resistance to the MVD. Should you choose to ignore this warning, the MVD will take the strictest measures to defend itself. I repeat, we will use the strictest measures to defend ourselves, the strictest measures. We will be waiting for you at the location of this loudspeaker one hour from now.

However, this served only as a pretext as civilians were subjected to gruelling interrogations and many were taken out of their homes and beaten. The troops also arrested several adult males, often without any conclusive evidence, who they accused of being members of the militia. Additionally, if there was no response by the villagers to the ultimatum issued by the troops, an artillery barrage was launched above and over the village itself to further intimidate the civilians. Tatul Krpeyan was killed during the fighting in Getashen and his men took several Soviet soldiers hostage, who were exchanged for 25 villagers taken hostage by the OMON (25 more were taken to a prison in Ganja).

After Soviet units completed the operation in the villages, they ordered full-scale deportation of all Armenian residents of the two villages, helicoptering them to Nagorno-Karabakh's capital, Stepanakert, and later to Armenia proper. The emptied-out villages were repopulated with Azerbaijani refugees who had fled from Armenia to Azerbaijan during the previous three years of ethnic tensions and violence. Initial public outcry denounced the launching of the operation as the Soviet and Azerbaijani governments went on to defend it, stating that the villagers of Shahumyan were providing aid and harbouring the militias in their homes. The Armenian government, along with the Soviet media, including Pravda and Moskovskiye Novosti, condemned the operation and described the acts of violence carried out by the army and OMON as excessive and unnecessary; the operation continued until the first week of May. In total, five thousand Armenians were deported from Getashen and Martunashen and neighboring villages, with an estimated 20 or 30 of them killed.

=== Second operation ===
A Mil Mi-24 helicopter circling above the Shahumyan region during the first operation.

On 7 May, a second operation was conducted by the same units, this time in the northeastern Armenian village of Voskepar of the Noyemberyan District. Under the same pretext as the previous operation, the joint forces entered Armenia with tanks and other armoured vehicles, claiming that militia units were staging attacks from that area into Azerbaijan. The operation was conducted in a similar manner but with deadlier results. In addition to the arbitrary arrests of twenty men in villages surrounding Voskepar, a bus carrying thirty Armenian policemen was attacked by elements of the 23rd Division, killing eleven of the officers and arresting the rest. The OMON units also took part in razing and looting the outlying villages around Voskepar. Residents were similarly forced to leave their homes and thus ceded them after signing a form which stated that they were leaving their homes at their own volition. Several villages in the southern Goris District of Armenia were also seized with several people arrested, mostly policemen.

The second operation provoked further anger from the Armenian government, which saw the operation as an encroachment against its sovereignty. Armenia's president, Levon Ter-Petrosyan claimed that the Soviet government was exacting retribution against his country for not taking part in the All-Union referendum by depopulating the villages. Reacting to media reports of unprovoked atrocities by the OMON, four members of the Russian parliament intervened on behalf of the Armenians, arriving in Voskepar on 15 May. Anatoly Shabad, the leading parliamentary member, secured the return of the captured Armenian policemen as the Soviet forces desisted from continuing out the rest of the operation.

A week after the events in Voskepar, the Armenian inhabitants of 17 settlements of the Hadrut and Shusha districts of Nagorno-Karabakh were deported. (Note: According to Memorial, these villages were Jraberd, Karing, Arakel, Banadzor, Karmrakar, Saralanj, Arevshat, Karaglukh, Petrosashen, Spitakashen, Tsamdzor, Tsor and Khandzazor of the Hadrut District, and Mets Shen, Yeghtsahogh and Kirov (Hin Shen) of the Shusha District) The human rights organization Memorial gives the following description of the events:

Early in the morning (usually 2–3 days prior to deportation) the settlement is encircled by USSR Interior Ministry troops or Soviet Army servicemen. Azerbaijani OMON units enter the settlement and start searching the houses. This is accompanied by robberies and violence. The residents are given an ultimatum to leave the settlement for good. Similar actions continue for 2–3 days. Sometimes civilians enter the settlement with OMON units to loot the houses. The male population of the settlements was deported to the nearest Azerbaijani-populated district centre (Lachin, Shusha, Djabrail). There the detainees were subjected to beatings and humiliations: they were forced to sign affidavits certifying that they leave the places of their permanent residence for good on their own volition; after that, some of the detainees were returned to the settlements, while a number of them were transferred to investigation wards.

== Human rights abuses and legality ==
Human rights organizations documented a wide number of human rights violations and abuses committed by Soviet and Azerbaijani forces. These included forced deportations of civilians, unlawful killings, torture, kidnapping, harassment, rape and the wanton seizure or destruction of property. Despite fierce protests, no measures were taken either to prevent the human rights abuses or to punish the perpetrators. Approximately 17,000 Armenians living in twenty-three of Shahumyan's villages were deported out of the region.

Professor Richard Wilson of Harvard University, who presented a report to the First International Andrei Sakharov Conference, noted that his fact-finding group did not find any "evidence, in spite of diligent enquiry, that anyone recently deported from the village of Getashen left it voluntarily." The delegation of the International Andrei Sakharov Conference concluded that:

Azerbaijani officials, including President of Azerbaijan Ayaz Mutalibov and the second secretary of the Central Committee of the Communist Party of Azerbaijan Victor Polyanichko, keep on approving these deportations, presenting them as a voluntary resetting of the inhabitants of NKAO. However, we have irrefutable evidence proving that these actions were carried out with brutal use of force and weaponry, which led to murders, mutilations and the loss of personal property.

The final report of the Committee on Human Rights of the Supreme Council of the RSFSR also concluded that the documents signed under the use of force cannot serve as evidence of voluntary departure of residents. The United States Congress (17 May 1991) and the European Parliament (14 March 1991) likewise passed resolutions condemning the Operation Ring. According to the US Department of State report,

In April Soviet army and Interior Ministry forces and Azeri OMON detachments attacked several Armenian villages in Nagorno-Karabakh and forcibly deported over 1,000 residents to Armenia, causing death, injuries, and loss of property."

== Aftermath ==
On 4 July, Gorbachev declared that the region was stabilizing, and announced an end to the operation. However, following the withdrawal of the MVD Internal Troops, the 23rd Division and Azerbaijani OMON attacked and expelled the inhabitants of three more Armenian-populated villages in Shahumyan: Erkech, Buzlug, and Manashid. In both military and strategic terms, Operation Ring was a failure. The aim of disarming the Armenian volunteer groups was never achieved. Despite the presence of helicopter gunships and armoured vehicles, the militiamen managed to elude and evade capture. In fact, the Armenian fighters continued to carry out bold operations. For example, in August 1991 they took 41 Soviet soldiers in the NKAO hostage to exchange with Armenian detainees.

Operation Ring, however, managed to reinforce the ethnic divide between Armenians and Azerbaijanis, "virtually precluding," according to Michael Croissant "the possibility of further coexistence between the peoples within" Azerbaijan's borders. Gorbachev and other Soviet officials maintained that Ring was necessary to prevent the region from further deteriorating into chaos and as the militias' presence contravened the July 1990 presidential decree. According to Shabad, however, the operation's objectives were impractical and Gorbachev had been misled on the general situation in Karabakh:

Evidently Mutalibov had persuaded Gorbachev that there was a powerful partisan army of fedayeen there and that its actions would lead to the secession of Armenian populated territories from Azerbaijan, that they were bandits and that they had to be liquidated. And Gorbachev – it was a great stupidity on his part of course – agreed to this operation. He probably understands now that an operation of that sort was doomed, it was impossible. We see in Chechnya that a war against partisans is an empty undertaking.

Armenia fiercely contested the legality of the operation and within two months declared its independence and seceded from the Soviet Union. Within several months, the fighting between Azerbaijan and Armenia would worsen and precipitate the open-phased segment of the First Nagorno-Karabakh War.

In the fall of 1991, Armenian volunteer groups recaptured most of the villages of Shahumyan that had been depopulated during Operation Ring, which allowed some of the displaced Armenian villagers to return home. When the Nagorno-Karabakh Republic declared its independence in December 1991, the Shahumyan District and part of the Khanlar District (the area around Getashen and Martunashen) were included within its claimed borders as the Shahumyan Province. These territories were captured by Azerbaijani forces in June 1992 during Operation Goranboy.

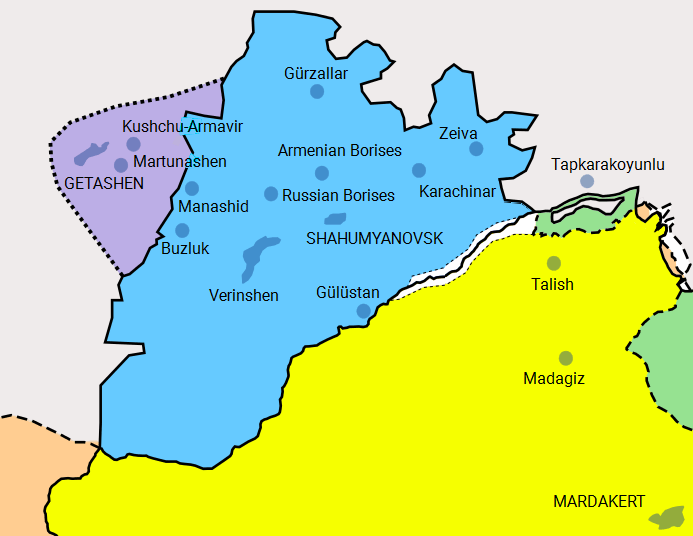
Former Shahumyan District of the Azerbaijan SSR and the Getashen Subdistrict, which are claimed by the Nagorno-Karabakh Republic as the province of Shahumyan.

== In popular culture ==
A series of documentary films titled "Wounds of Karabakh" (1994) were shot by Bulgarian journalist Tsvetana Paskaleva. The series was shot during different phases of the operation, giving a detailed account of the events.

In June 2006, the film Destiny (Armenian: Ճակատագիր; Chakatagir) premiered in Yerevan and Stepanakert. The film stars and is written by Gor Vardanyan and is a fictional account of the events revolving around Operation Ring. It cost $3.8 million to make, making the most expensive Armenian film ever making, and is the first such film made about the First Nagorno-Karabakh War.

== See also ==
- Sumgait pogrom (1988)
- Kirovabad pogrom (1988)
- Pogrom of Armenians in Baku (1990)
- Shelling of Stepanakert (1991–1992)
- Maraga Massacre (1992)
- Anti-Armenianism
- Anti-Armenianism in Azerbaijan
