= Tsakuri =

Tsakuri Ծակուռի
- Hünərli
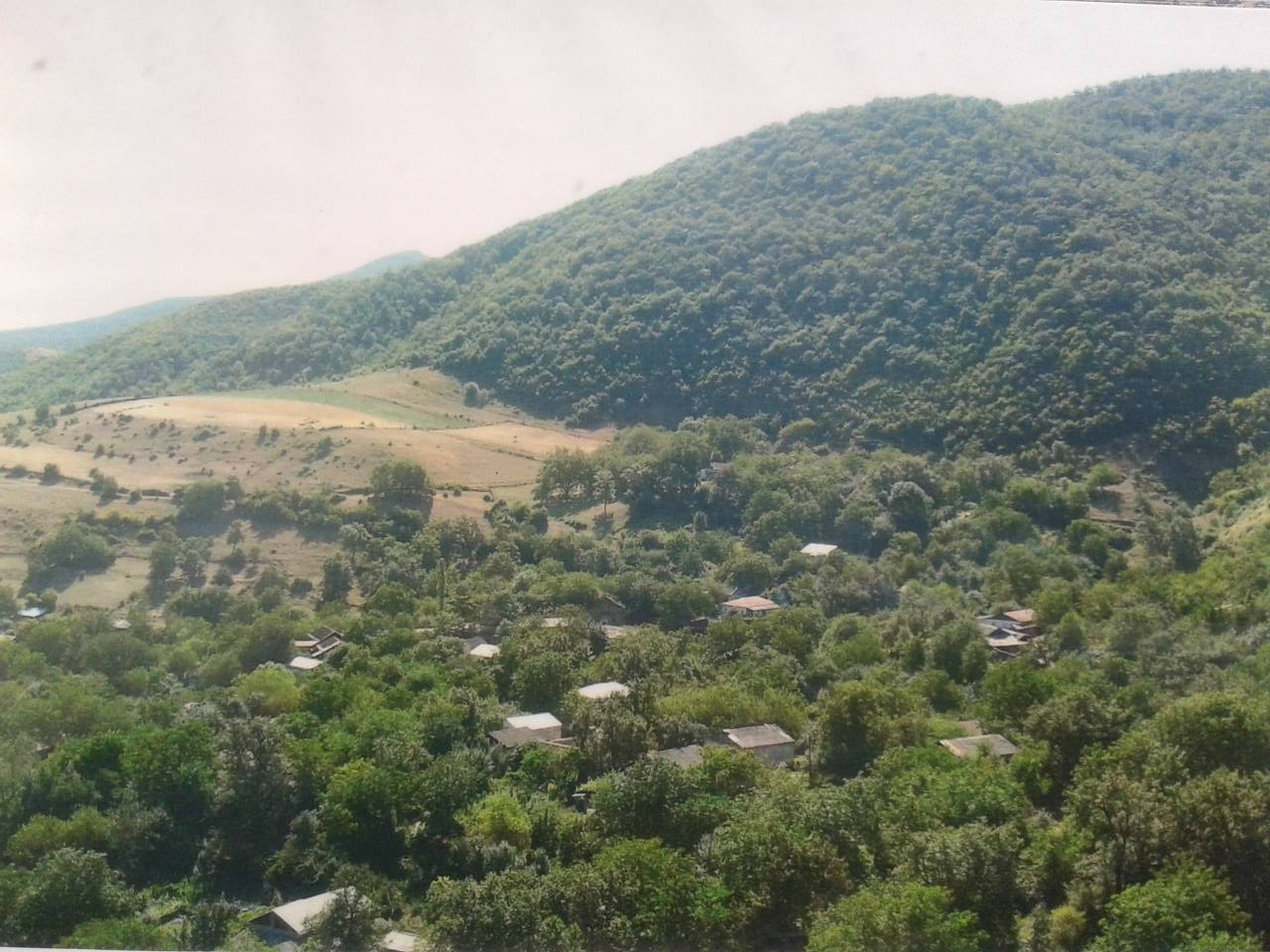
- View of Tsakuri

- Location within Azerbaijan
- Coordinates: 39°34′11″N 46°59′01″E
- Country: Azerbaijan
- District: Khojavend

Population (2015)
  - Total: 109
- Time zone: UTC+4 (AZT)

Tsakuri (Armenian: Ծակուռի) or Hunarli (Azerbaijani: Hünərli, previously Zakirli) is a village in the Khojavend District of Azerbaijan, in the disputed region of Nagorno-Karabakh. The village had an ethnic Armenian-majority population prior to the 2020 Nagorno-Karabakh war, and also had an Armenian majority in 1989.

The village is located 13 km from the town of Hadrut and a 57 km drive over the north-south highway from the regional capital of Stepanakert. Hikers reach Tsakuri in the Togh (Tugh) section of the marked Janapar trail.

== History ==
During the Soviet period, Tsakuri was part of the Hadrut District of the Nagorno-Karabakh Autonomous Oblast. After the First Nagorno-Karabakh War, the village was administrated as part of the Hadrut Province of the breakaway Republic of Artsakh. The village came under the control of Azerbaijan on 7 October 2020, during the 2020 Nagorno-Karabakh war.

== Historical heritage sites ==
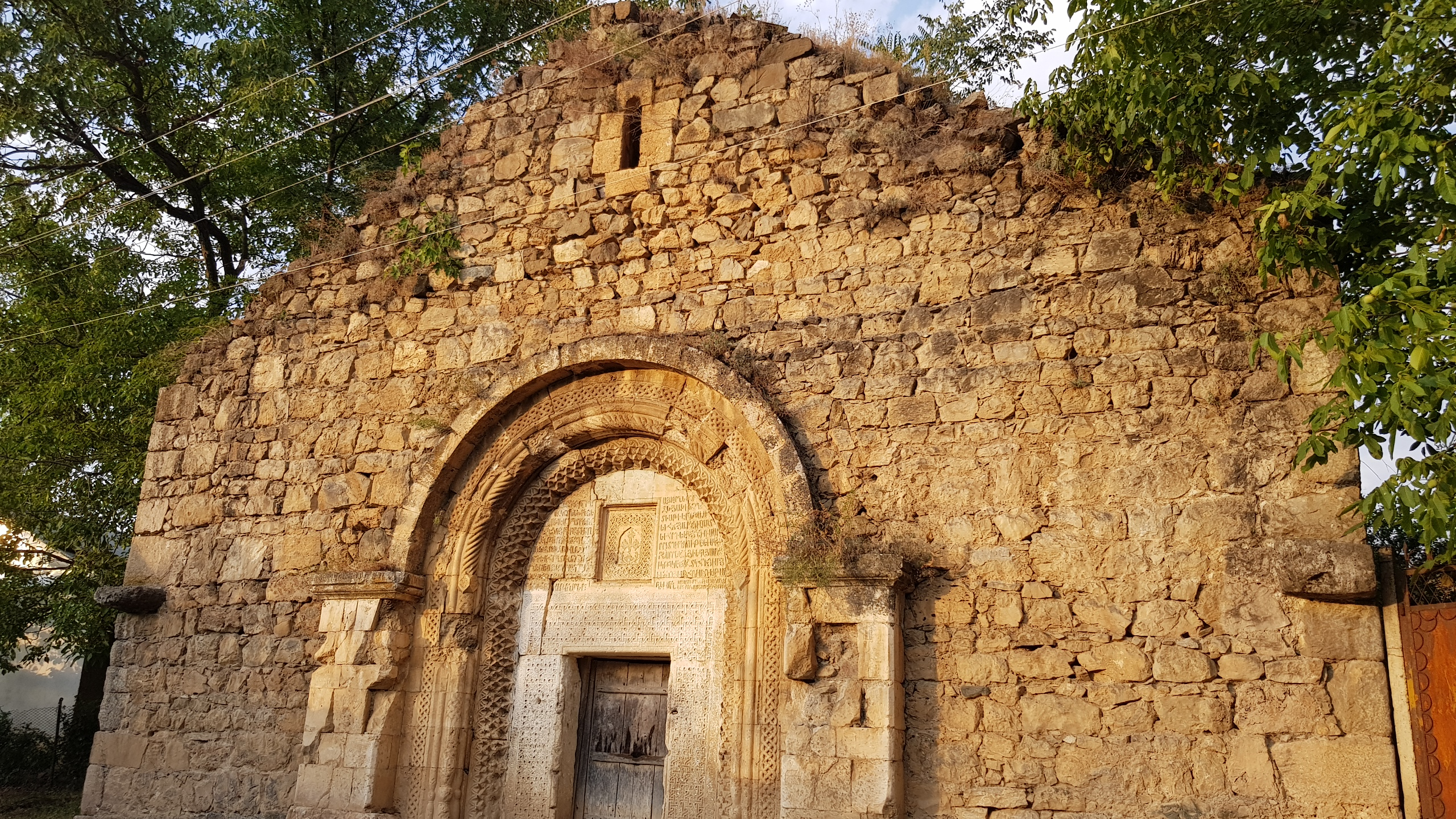
Holy Mother of God Church in Tsakuri (founded in the 12th century, with the current church dating from 1682)

Historical heritage sites in and around Tsakuri include the monastery complex of Tsaghkavank (Armenian: Ծաղկավանք), of which only the Holy Mother of God Church has been preserved, the Ptkatagh Monastery (Armenian: Պտկաթաղի վանք, romanized: Ptkatagh Vank) built in 1670, a cemetery from between the 17th and 19th centuries, a 17th-century khachkar, and a 19th-century spring monument.

=== Holy Mother of God Church ===
The Holy Mother of God Church (Armenian: Սուրբ Աստվածածին եկեղեցի, romanized: Surb Astvatsatsin Yekeghetsi, also known as St. Mary's Church and Tsaghkavank Church) was founded in the 12th century and contains a khachkar from 1198, with the current church dating from 1682. The church is the only remaining structure of the Tsaghkavank monastery complex in Tsakuri.

Efforts to rehabilitate the church were initiated by a group of international benefactors, and preparation work and fundraising started in the 2010s. In July 2013, the Primate of the Diocese of Artsakh of the Armenian Apostolic Church, Archbishop Pargev Martirosyan, gave his blessing to the project and construction work started in May 2019. The second phase of the project for the renovation of the church's interior was planned to be partly funded by an international crowdfunding campaign. After the 2020 Nagorno-Karabakh war, Azerbaijani president Ilham Aliyev visited the Holy Mother of God Church in Tsakuri, denying the church's Armenian identity, and describing the church's inscriptions in Armenian as "fake".

== Geography ==
The area of the Tsakuri community is lowland with a total area of 307.4 hectares, of which 241.68 hectares are of agricultural importance and 32.9 hectares consists of forested land. The area has an especially mild micro-climate thanks to its apple, pear, mulberry and walnut trees. Deposits of Icelandic spar can be found in and around the village.

== Economy and culture ==
In 2015, the population was mainly engaged in agriculture and animal husbandry, and the village had a municipal building, a house of culture, the Tsakuri branch of Mariamadzor Secondary School, and a medical centre. The village had access to electricity, TV and radio, mobile and wireless telephony and internet services. The water supply is provided to the village through a gravity system fed from the two springs of Aknen (Armenian: Ակնեն) and Nerses (Armenian: Ներսես).

== Demographics ==
The village had 100 inhabitants in 2005, and 109 inhabitants in 2015, in approximately 28 households.
