= Hadrut (disambiguation) =

Hadrut is a ghost town in the Nagorno-Karabakh region of Azerbaijan. It may also refer to:

- Hadrut District (NKAO) - a district within the former Nagorno-Karabakh Autonomous Oblast of Azerbaijan SSR.
- Hadrut Province - a province of the self-proclaimed Republic of Artsakh.
