= Cilan =

Cilan may refer to:

- Cilən (sometimes spelt 'Cilan'), a village in Azerbaijan
- Cilan, a Gym Leader in the Pokémon TV series
