= Düdükçü =

Dudukchu / Kyuratagh Düdükçü / Քյուրաթաղ
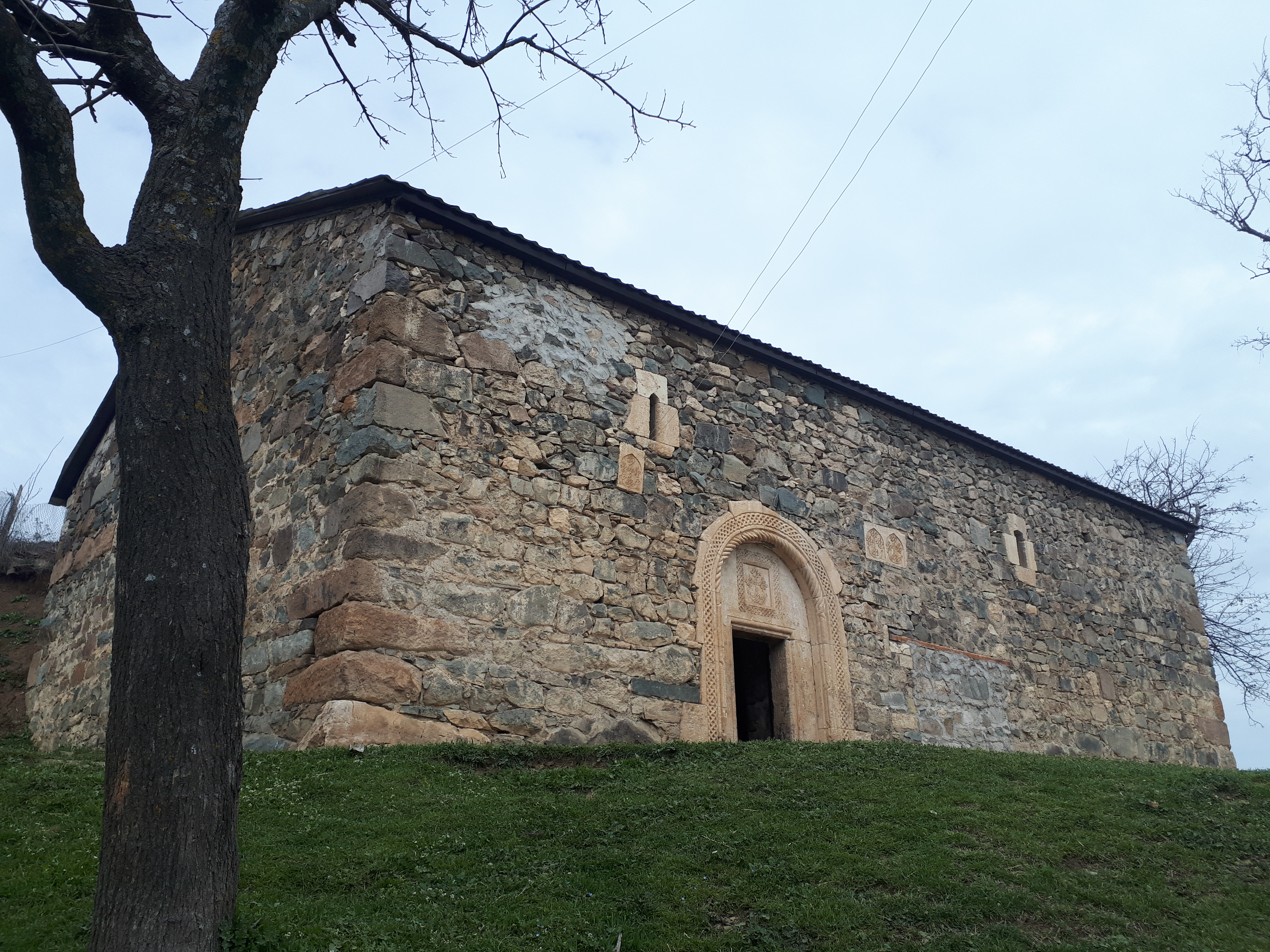
- Church of the Holy Mother of God in the village from 1743

- Location within Azerbaijan
- Coordinates: 39°34′28″N 47°03′05″E
- Country: Azerbaijan
- District: Khojavend

Population (2015)
  - Total: 321
- Time zone: UTC+4 (AZT)

Dudukchu (Azerbaijani: Düdükçü) or Kyuratagh (Armenian: Քյուրաթաղ) is a village in the Khojavend District of Azerbaijan, in the disputed region of Nagorno-Karabakh. The village had an ethnic Armenian-majority population prior to the 2020 Nagorno-Karabakh war, and also had an Armenian majority in 1989.

As of October 2023, Azerbaijan has exiled all Armenians in the region after a blockade of all roads to force the Armenian population out and regained control of the lands.

== History ==
During the Soviet period, the village was part of the Hadrut District of the Nagorno-Karabakh Autonomous Oblast. After the First Nagorno-Karabakh War, the village was administrated as part of the Hadrut Province of the breakaway Republic of Artsakh. The village came under the control of Azerbaijan on 15 October 2020, during the 2020 Nagorno-Karabakh war.

== Historical heritage sites ==
Historical heritage sites in and around the village include the church of Surb Astvatsatsin (Armenian: Սուրբ Աստվածածին, lit. 'Holy Mother of God') built in 1743, and an 18th/19th-century cemetery.

== Demographics ==
The village had 274 inhabitants in 2005, and 321 inhabitants in 2015.
