= Xırmancıq =

Khirmanjyg / Tsaghkavank Xırmancıq / Ծաղկավանք
- Location within Azerbaijan
- Coordinates: 39°32′37″N 47°05′27″E
- Country: Azerbaijan
- District: Khojavend

Population (2015)
  - Total: 4
- Time zone: UTC+4 (AZT)

Khirmanjyg (Azerbaijani: Xırmancıq) or Tsaghkavank (Armenian: Ծաղկավանք) is a village in the Khojavend District of Azerbaijan, in the disputed region of Nagorno-Karabakh. The village had an ethnic Armenian-majority population prior to the 2020 Nagorno-Karabakh war, and also had an Armenian majority in 1989.

== History ==
During the Soviet period, the village was part of the Hadrut District of the Nagorno-Karabakh Autonomous Oblast. After the First Nagorno-Karabakh War, the village was administrated as part of the Hadrut Province of the breakaway Republic of Artsakh. The village came under the control of Azerbaijan during the 2020 Nagorno-Karabakh war.

== Historical heritage sites ==
Historical heritage sites in and around the village include the 19th-century church of Surb Astvatsatsin (Armenian: Սուրբ Աստվածածին, lit. 'Holy Mother of God'), and a 19th-century cemetery.

== Demographics ==
The village had 16 inhabitants in 2005, and 4 inhabitants in 2015.
