= Taghaser =

Taghaser Թաղասեռ Tağaser
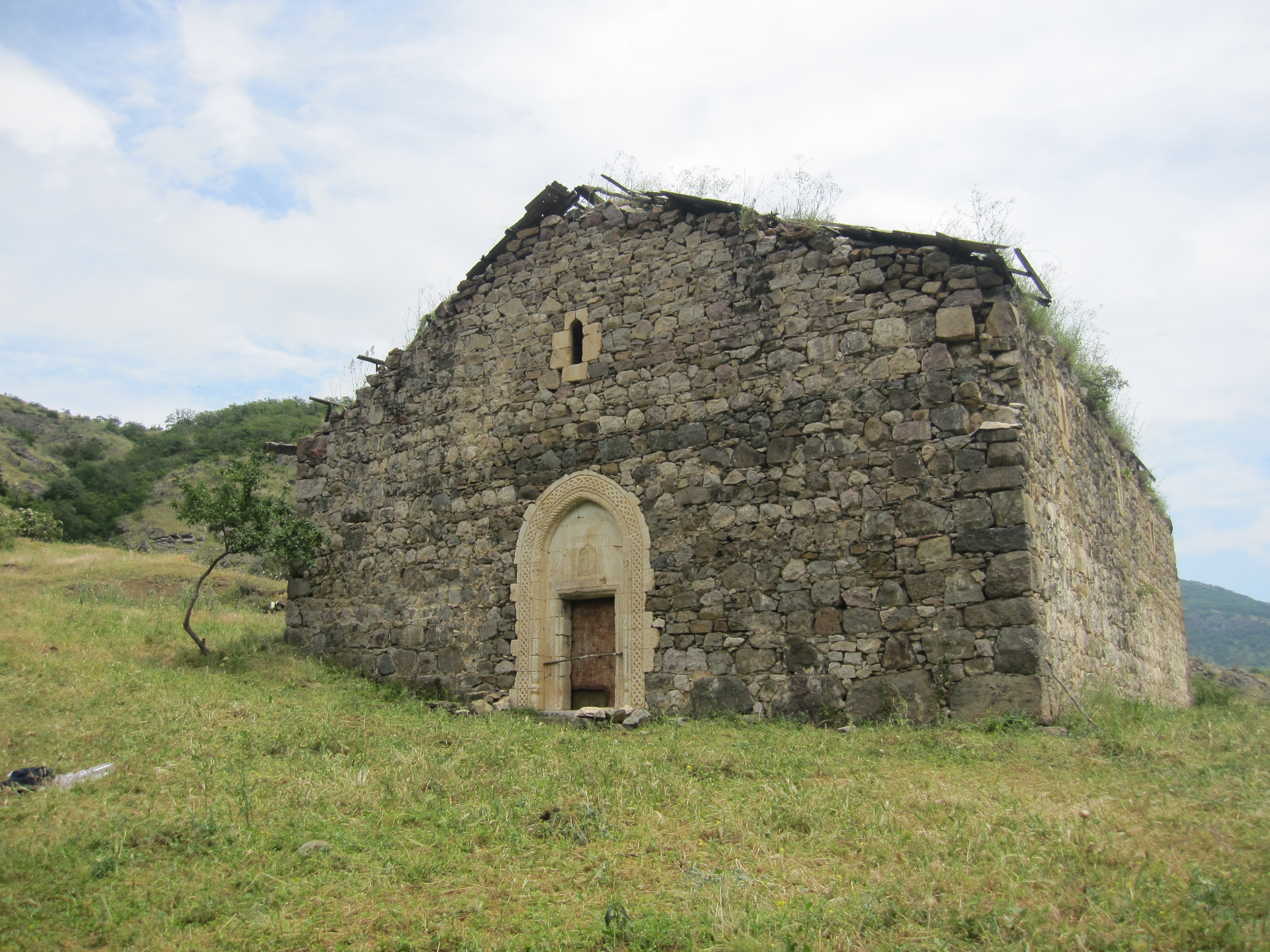
- 17th-century Surb Astvatsatsin Church

- Location within Azerbaijan Location within Karabakh Economic Region
- Coordinates: 39°31′08″N 47°00′42″E
- Country: Azerbaijan
- District: Khojavend
- Elevation: 843 m (2,766 ft)

Population (2015)
  - Total: 434
- Time zone: UTC+4 (AZT)

Taghaser (Armenian: Թաղասեռ; Azerbaijani: Tağaser) is a village in the Khojavend District of Azerbaijan, in the disputed region of Nagorno-Karabakh. The village is located close to the town of Hadrut. The village had an ethnic Armenian-majority population prior to the 2020 Nagorno-Karabakh war, and also had an Armenian majority in 1989.

== Toponymy ==
The name Taghaser derives from two Armenian words, Tagh, meaning quarter (of a city), and Ser, meaning vertex.

== History ==
During the Soviet period, the village was part of the Hadrut District of the Nagorno-Karabakh Autonomous Oblast. After the First Nagorno-Karabakh War, the village was administrated as part of the Hadrut Province of the breakaway Republic of Artsakh. The village came under the control of Azerbaijan on 14 October 2020, during the 2020 Nagorno-Karabakh war.

== Historical heritage sites ==
Historical heritage sites in and around the village include a 14th/15th-century khachkar, the church of Taghaseri Anapat (Armenian: Թաղասեռի անապատ) built in 1635, the bridge of Hin Taghaser (Armenian: Հին Թաղասեռ, lit. 'Old Taghaser') built in 1763, the 17th-century church of Surb Astvatsatsin (Armenian: Սուրբ Աստվածածին, lit. 'Holy Mother of God'), the 17th-century village of Hin Shen (Armenian: Հին Շեն), a cemetery from between the 17th and 19th centuries, and a 20th-century spring monument.

== Demographics ==
The village had 491 inhabitants in 2005, and 434 inhabitants in 2015.

== Gallery ==
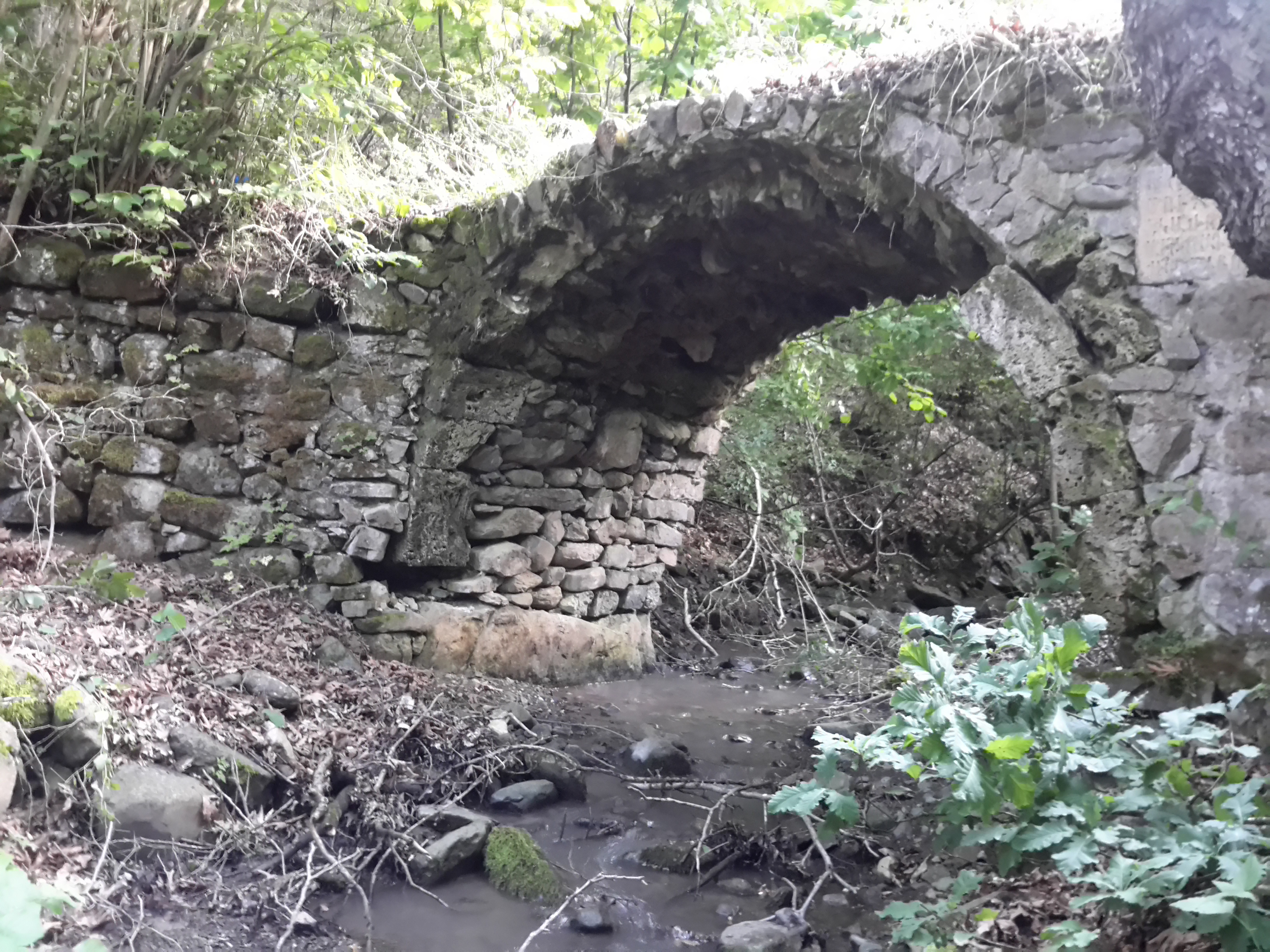
Hin Taghaser Bridge built in 1763

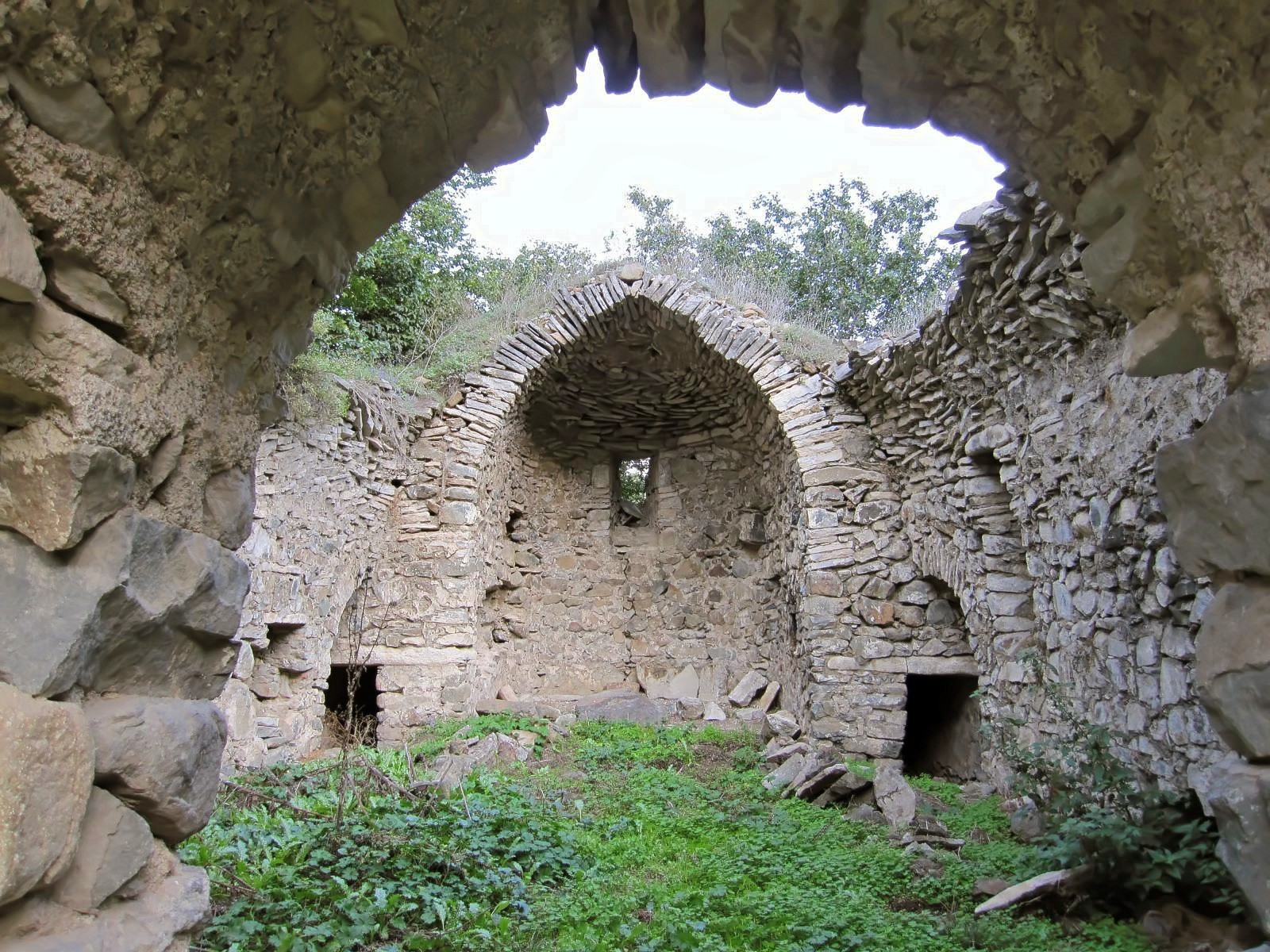
Taghaseri Anapat Church built in 1635

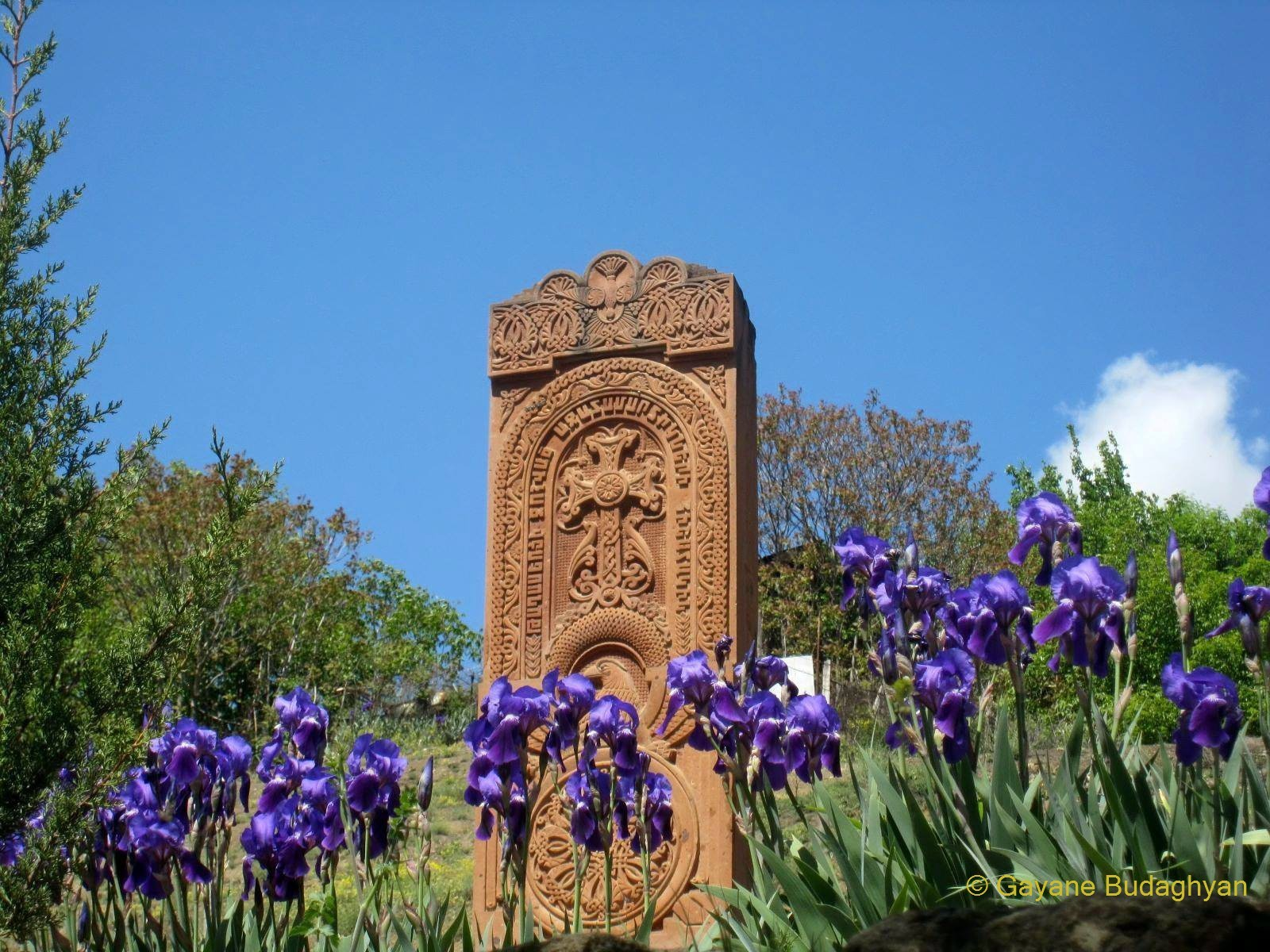
Memorial to the fallen in the Nagorno-Karabakh conflict
