= Ataqut =

Atagut / Taghut Ataqut / Թաղուտ
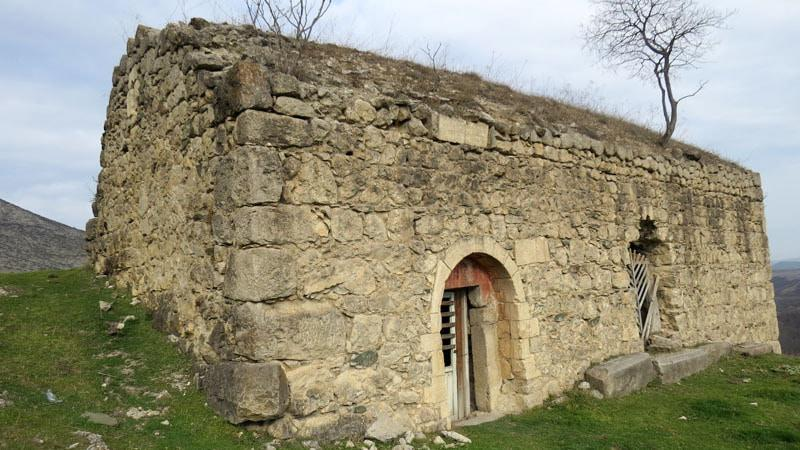
- 19th-century St. John's Church in the village

- Location within Azerbaijan Location within Karabakh Economic Region
- Coordinates: 39°34′11″N 46°57′43″E
- Country: Azerbaijan
- District: Khojavend

Population (2015)
  - Total: 205
- Time zone: UTC+4 (AZT)

Atagut (Azerbaijani: Ataqut) or Taghut (Armenian: Թաղուտ) is a village in the Khojavend District of Azerbaijan, in the region of Nagorno-Karabakh. The village had an ethnic Armenian-majority population prior to the 2020 Nagorno-Karabakh war, and also had an Armenian majority in 1989.

== History ==
During the Soviet period, the village was part of the Hadrut District of the Nagorno-Karabakh Autonomous Oblast. After the First Nagorno-Karabakh War, the village was administrated as part of the Hadrut Province of the breakaway Republic of Artsakh. The village came under the control of Azerbaijan on 7 November 2020, during the 2020 Nagorno-Karabakh war.

== Historical heritage sites ==
Historical heritage sites in and around the village include a 17th-century spring monument, an 18th-century caravanserai, an 18th/19th-century cemetery, a 19th-century watermill, and the 19th-century St. John's Church (Armenian: Սուրբ Հովհաննես եկեղեցի, romanized: Surb Hovhannes Yekeghetsi).

== Demographics ==
The village had 198 inhabitants in 2005, and 205 inhabitants in 2015.
