= Günəşli, Khojavend =

Gunashli / Norashen Günəşli / Նորաշեն
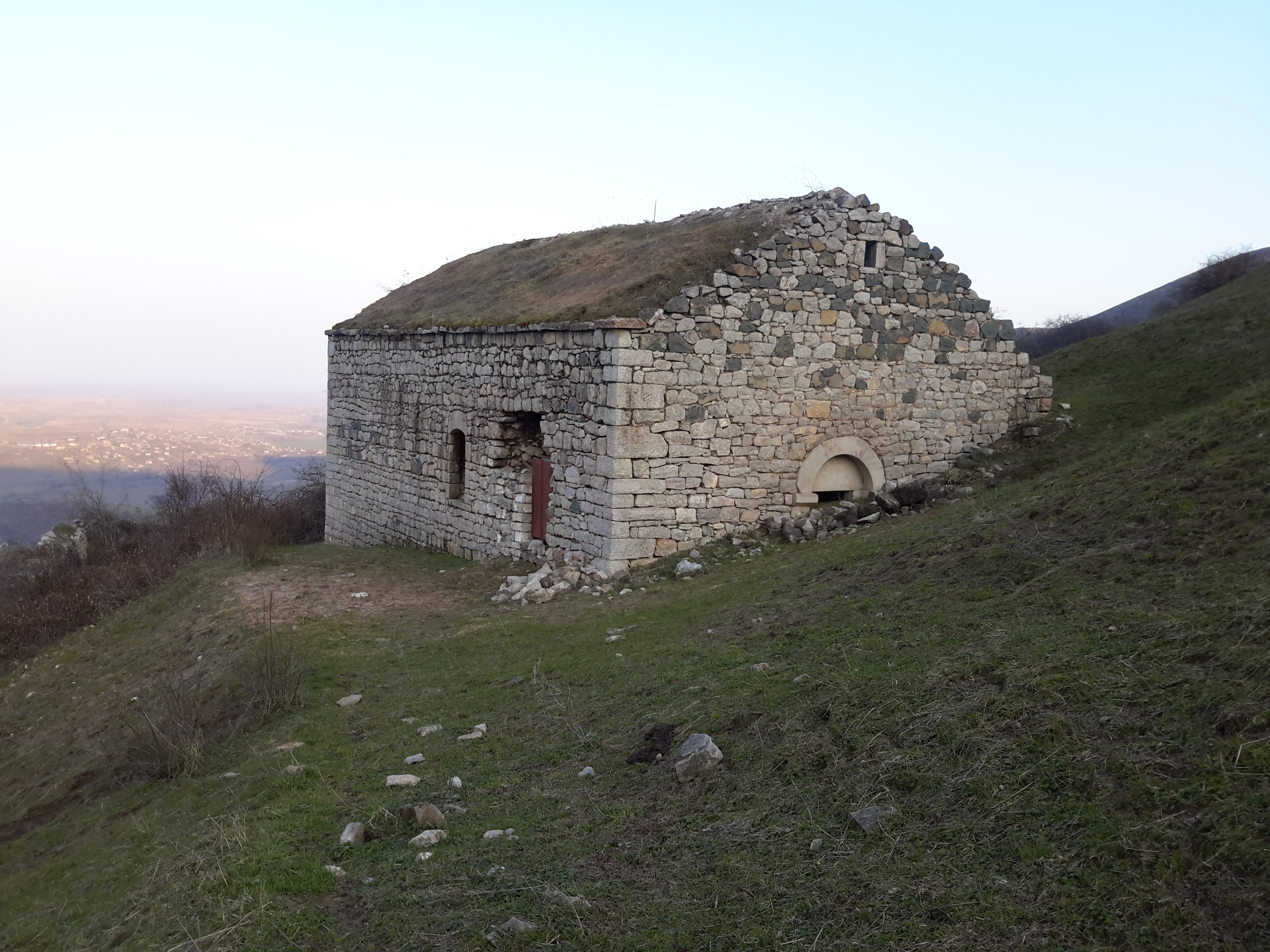
- Hin Norashen Church from 1893

- Location within Azerbaijan
- Coordinates: 39°30′N 47°05′E
- Country: Azerbaijan
- District: Khojavend

Population (2015)
  - Total: 159
- Time zone: UTC+4 (AZT)

Gunashli (Azerbaijani: Günəşli, lit. 'sunny') or Norashen (Armenian: Նորաշեն, lit. 'new village') is a village in the Khojavend District of Azerbaijan, in the disputed region of Nagorno-Karabakh. The village had an ethnic Armenian-majority population prior to the 2020 Nagorno-Karabakh war, and also had an Armenian majority in 1989.

== History ==
During the Soviet period, the village was part of the Hadrut District of the Nagorno-Karabakh Autonomous Oblast. After the First Nagorno-Karabakh War, the village was administrated as part of the Hadrut Province of the breakaway Republic of Artsakh. The village was rebuilt after the war, and in September 2006 a new school was built. The village came under the control of Azerbaijan on 20 October 2020, during the 2020 Nagorno-Karabakh war.

== Historical heritage sites ==
Historical heritage sites in and around the village include khachkars from between the 9th and 11th centuries, a 19th-century cemetery, and the church of Hin Norashen (Armenian: Հին Նորաշեն, lit. 'Old Norashen') built in 1893.

== Demographics ==
The village had 112 inhabitants in 2005, and 159 inhabitants in 2015.
