= Şahyeri =

Shahyeri / Sarinshen Şahyeri / Սարինշեն
- Location within Azerbaijan
- Coordinates: 39°30′31″N 46°59′00″E
- Country: Azerbaijan
- District: Khojavend

Population (2015)
  - Total: 15
- Time zone: UTC+4 (AZT)

Shahyeri (Azerbaijani: Şahyeri) or Sarinshen (Armenian: Սարինշեն) is a village in the Khojavend District of Azerbaijan, in the disputed region of Nagorno-Karabakh. The village had an ethnic Armenian-majority population prior to the 2020 Nagorno-Karabakh war, and also had an Armenian majority in 1989.

== History ==
During the Soviet period, the village was part of the Hadrut District of the Nagorno-Karabakh Autonomous Oblast. After the First Nagorno-Karabakh War, the village was administrated as part of the Hadrut Province of the breakaway Republic of Artsakh. The village came under the control of Azerbaijan during the 2020 Nagorno-Karabakh war.

== Historical heritage sites ==
Historical heritage sites in and around the village include khachkars, tombstones, the spring monument of Verin (Armenian: Վերին, lit. 'upper'), and the 19th-century church of Surb Astvatsatsin (Armenian: Սուրբ Աստվածածին, lit. 'Holy Mother of God').

== Demographics ==
The village had 27 inhabitants in 2005, and 15 inhabitants in 2015.
