= Dağdöşü =

Daghdoshu / Tyak Dağdöşü / Տյաք
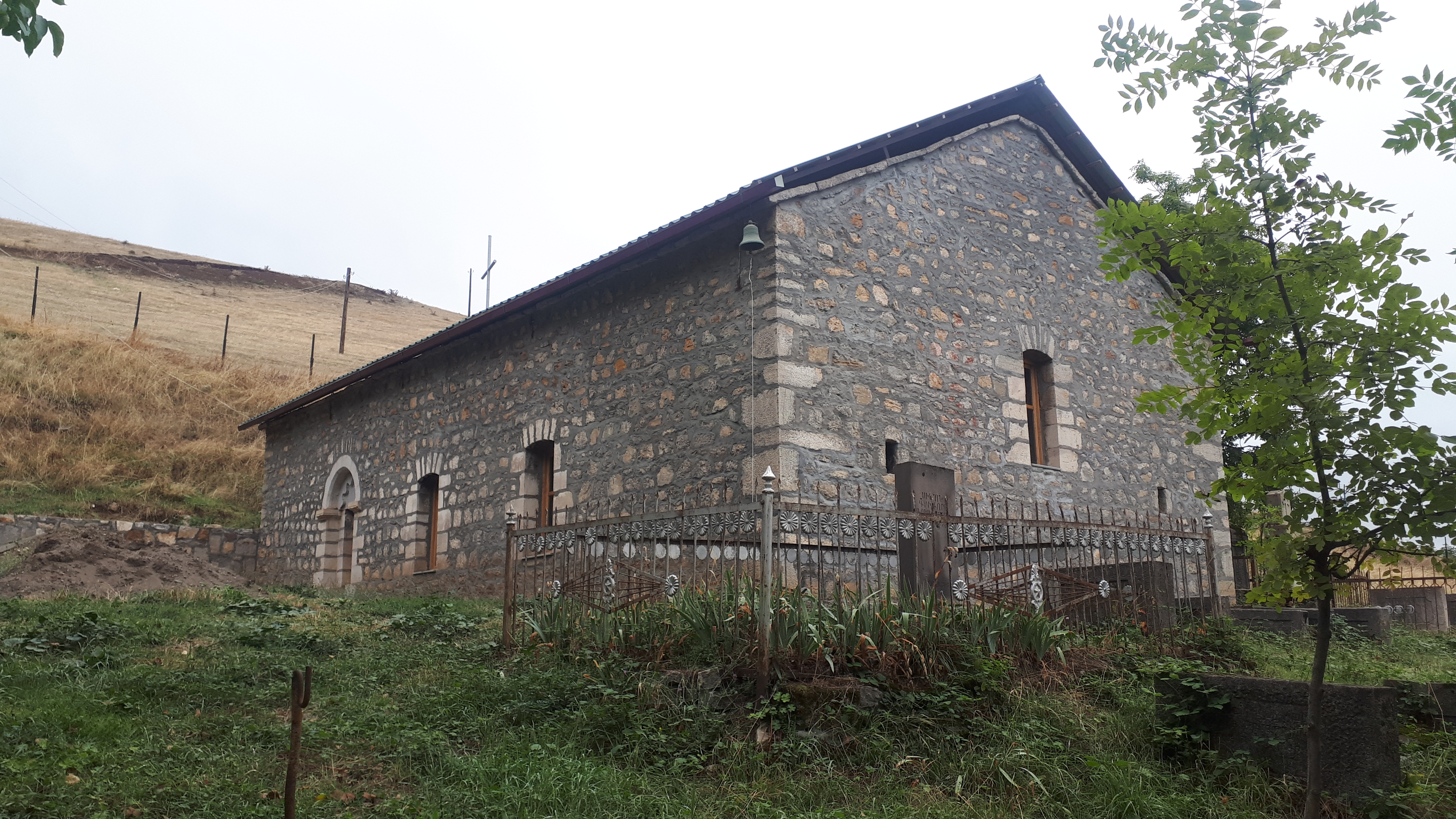
- 19th-century church of Surb Mesrop in the village

- Location within Azerbaijan
- Coordinates: 39°30′18″N 47°01′51″E
- Country: Azerbaijan
- District: Khojavend

Population (2015)
  - Total: 70
- Time zone: UTC+4 (AZT)

Daghdoshu (Azerbaijani: Dağdöşü, lit. 'mountainside') or Tyak (Armenian: Տյաք) is a village in the Khojavend District of Azerbaijan, in the disputed region of Nagorno-Karabakh. The village is located close to the town of Hadrut. The village had an ethnic Armenian-majority population prior to the 2020 Nagorno-Karabakh war, and also had an Armenian majority in 1989.

== History ==
During the Soviet period, the village was part of the Hadrut District of the Nagorno-Karabakh Autonomous Oblast. After the First Nagorno-Karabakh War, the village was administrated as part of the Hadrut Province of the breakaway Republic of Artsakh. The village came under the control of Azerbaijan during the 2020 Nagorno-Karabakh war.

== Historical heritage sites ==
Historical heritage sites in and around the village include the church of Surb Mesrop (Armenian: Սուրբ Մեսրոպ), a cemetery, and a spring monument from the 19th century.

== Demographics ==
The village had 71 inhabitants in 2005, and 70 inhabitants in 2015.
