= Hartashen =

Hartashen may refer to:

- Hartashen, Shirak, Armenia
- Hartashen, Syunik, Armenia
- Hartashen or Axullu, Nagorno-Karabakh
- Hartashen Megalithic Avenue
