= Ağdam, Khojavend =

Aghdam / Hakaku Ağdam / Հակակու
- Location within Azerbaijan Location within Karabakh Economic Region
- Coordinates: 39°33′05″N 46°57′08″E
- Country: Azerbaijan
- District: Khojavend
- Elevation: 1,038 m (3,406 ft)

Population (2015)
  - Total: 142
- Time zone: UTC+4 (AZT)

Aghdam (Azerbaijani: Ağdam) or Hakaku (Armenian: Հակակու) is a village in the Khojavend District of Azerbaijan, in the region of Nagorno-Karabakh. The village had an ethnic Armenian-majority population prior to the 2020 Nagorno-Karabakh war, and also had an Armenian majority in 1989.

== History ==
During the Soviet period, the village was part of the Hadrut District of the Nagorno-Karabakh Autonomous Oblast. After the First Nagorno-Karabakh War, the village was administrated as part of the Hadrut Province of the breakaway Republic of Artsakh. The village came under the control of Azerbaijan on 9 November 2020, during the 2020 Nagorno-Karabakh war.

== Historical heritage sites ==
Historical heritage sites in and around the village include the church of Surb Astvatsatsin (Armenian: Սուրբ Աստվածածին, lit. 'Holy Mother of God') built in 1621, a 17th-century khachkar, a cemetery from between the 17th and 19th centuries, and a 19th-century watermill.

== Demographics ==
The village had 145 inhabitants in 2005, and 142 inhabitants in 2015.
