= Aygestan (disambiguation) =

Aygestan may refer to:

- Aygestan - village in Armenia
- Aygestan, Askeran - village in the Askeran Province of Artsakh
- Çaylı, Tartar - village in the Tartar District of Azerbaijan
- Qoçbəyli - village in the Khojavend District of Azerbaijan
