= Çiraquz =

Chiraguz / Jrakus Çiraquz / Ջրակուս
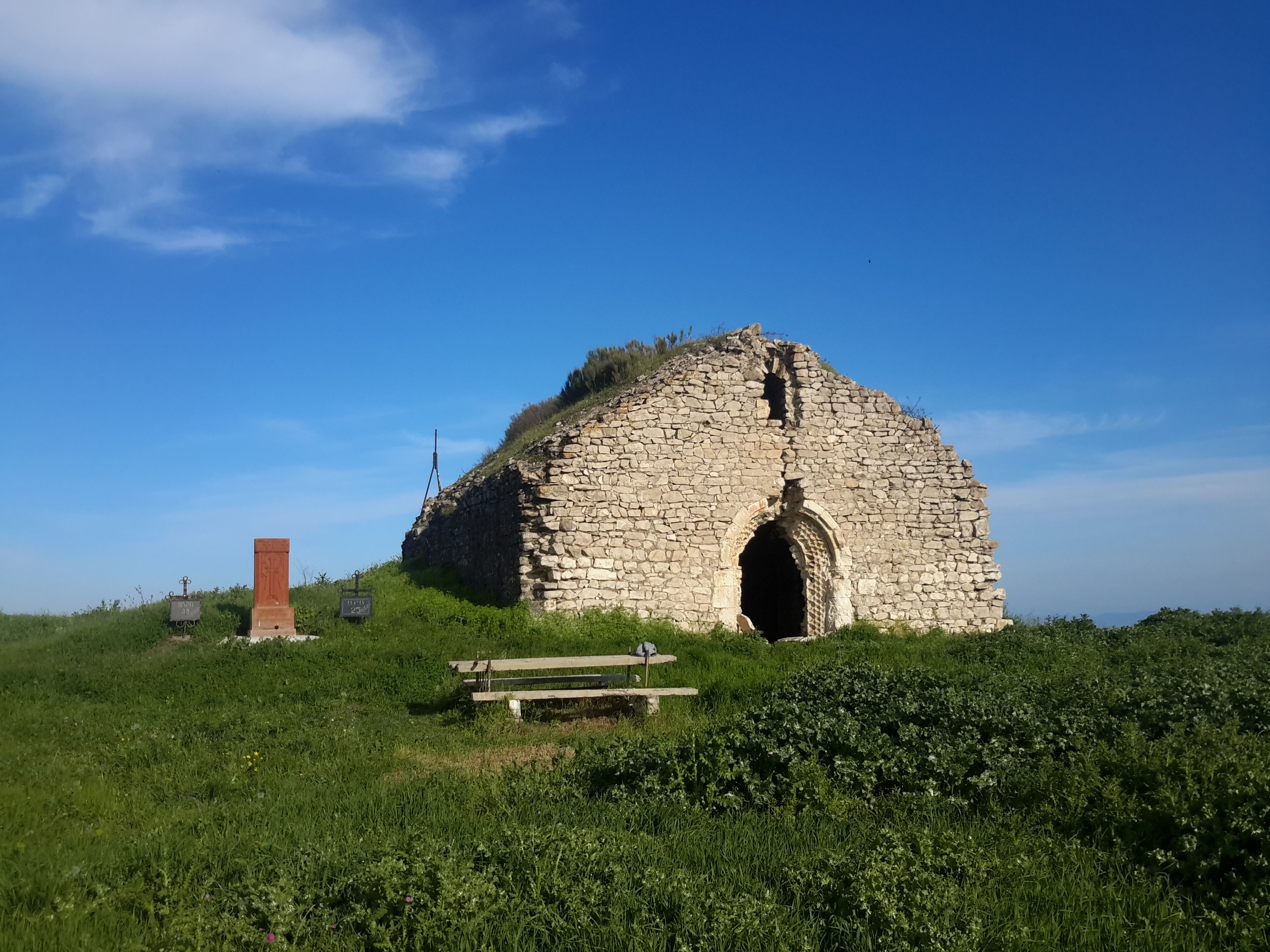
- Kavakavank Monastery near the village, built in 1742 at the site of an old monastic complex.

- Location within Azerbaijan
- Coordinates: 39°34′36″N 47°00′48″E
- Country: Azerbaijan
- District: Khojavend
- Elevation: 748 m (2,454 ft)

Population (2015)
  - Total: 238
- Time zone: UTC+4 (AZT)

Chiraguz (Azerbaijani: Çiraquz) or Jrakus (Note: Alternatively transliterated as Djrakus, Dgrakous and Jrakuys.) (Armenian: Ջրակուս) is a village in the Khojavend District of Azerbaijan, in the disputed region of Nagorno-Karabakh. The village had an Armenian-majority population prior to the 2020 Nagorno-Karabakh war, and also had an Armenian majority in 1989.

== History ==
During the Soviet period, the village was part of the Hadrut District of the Nagorno-Karabakh Autonomous Oblast. After the First Nagorno-Karabakh War, the village was administrated as part of the Hadrut Province of the breakaway Republic of Artsakh. The village came under the control of Azerbaijan on 15 October 2020, during the 2020 Nagorno-Karabakh war.

== Historical heritage sites ==
Historical heritage sites in and around the village include a 12th/13th-century khachkar and spring monument, a cemetery from between the 16th and 19th centuries, St. Stephen's Church (Armenian: Սուրբ Ստեփանոս եկեղեցի, romanized: Surb Stepanos Yekeghetsi) built in 1698, and the monastery of Kavakavank (Armenian: Կավաքավանք) built in 1742.

== Demographics ==
The village had 233 inhabitants in 2005, and 238 inhabitants in 2015.
