= Susanlıq =

Susanlyg / Mokhrenes Susanlıq / Մոխրենես
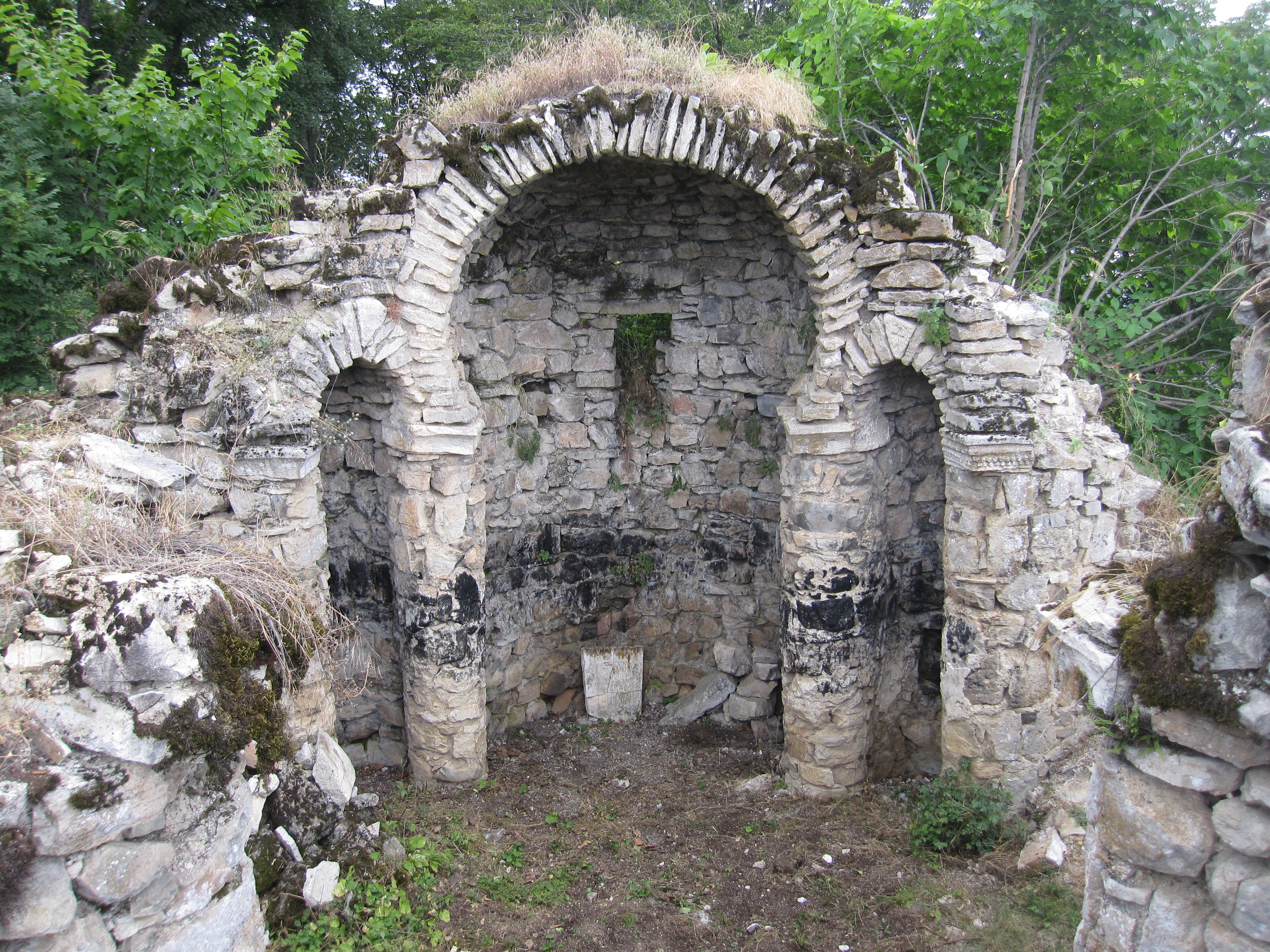
- The monastery church of Okhty Drni

- Location within Azerbaijan
- Coordinates: 39°34′10″N 46°55′47″E
- Country: Azerbaijan
- District: Khojavend

Population (2015)
  - Total: 180
- Time zone: UTC+4 (AZT)

Susanlyg (Azerbaijani: Susanlıq) or Mokhrenes (Armenian: Մոխրենես) is a village in the Khojavend District of Azerbaijan, in the disputed region of Nagorno-Karabakh. The village had an ethnic Armenian-majority population prior to the 2020 Nagorno-Karabakh war, and also had an Armenian majority in 1989.

== History ==
During the Soviet period, the village was part of the Hadrut District of the Nagorno-Karabakh Autonomous Oblast. After the First Nagorno-Karabakh War, the village was administrated as part of the Hadrut Province of the breakaway Republic of Artsakh. The village came under the control of Azerbaijan during the 2020 Nagorno-Karabakh war. Subsequently, the 18th-century Armenian St. Sargis Church of the village was destroyed by Azerbaijan between March-July 2022.

== Historical heritage sites ==
Historical heritage sites in and around the village include the 5th/6th-century monastery church of Okhty Drni (Armenian: Օխտը դռնի, lit. 'Seven Doors'), a 10th/11th-century khachkar, a 13th-century bridge, an 18th/19th-century cemetery, and the church of Surb Sargis (Armenian: Սուրբ Սարգիս) built in 1840. St. Sargis church was destroyed between March and July 2022.

== Demographics ==
The village had 212 inhabitants in 2005, and 180 inhabitants in 2015.

== Gallery ==
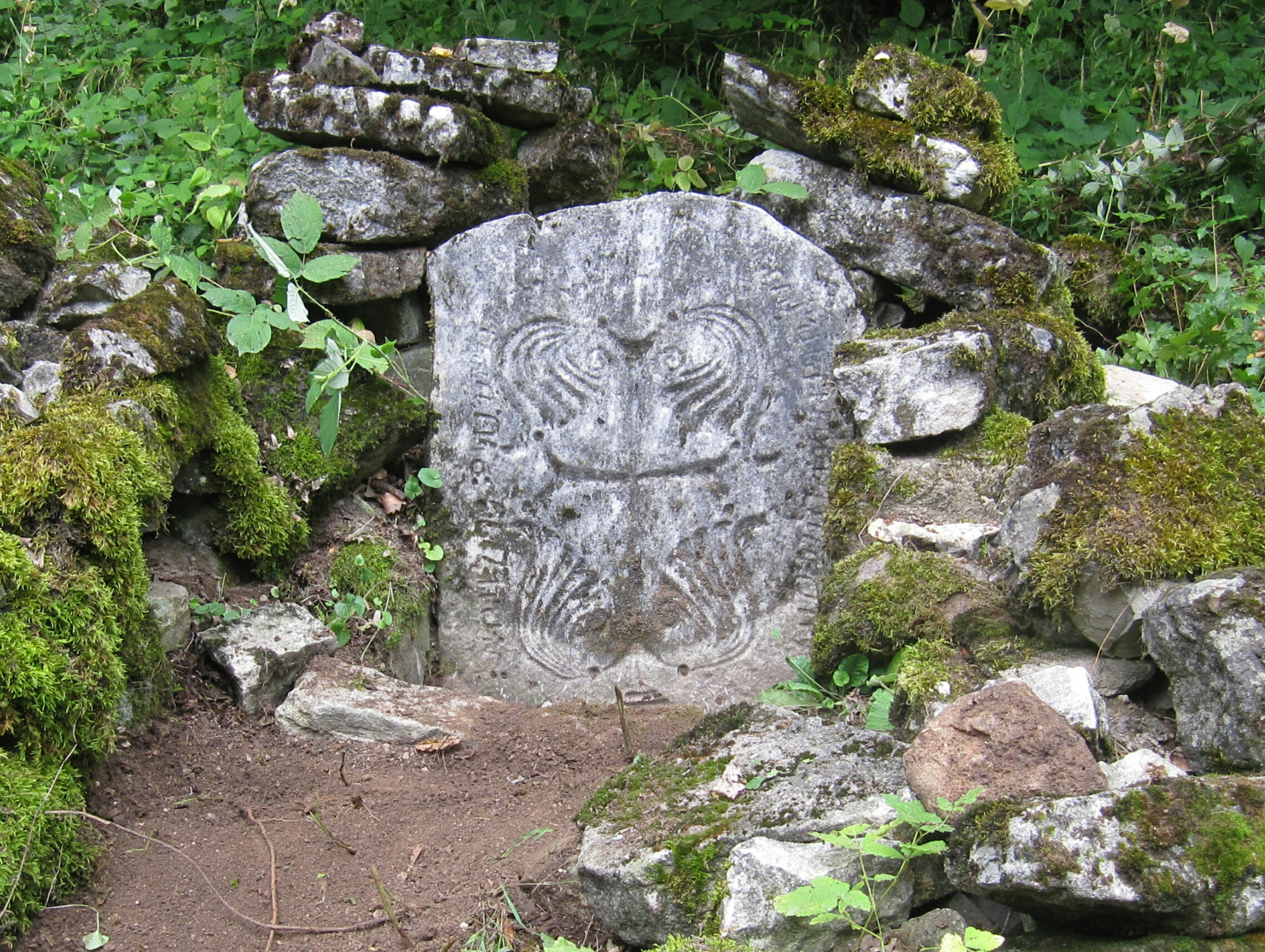
Khachkar near the monastery church of Okhty Drni with an inscription from 1044
