= Zoğalbulaq =

Zoghalbulag / Drakhtik Zoğalbulaq / Դրախտիկ
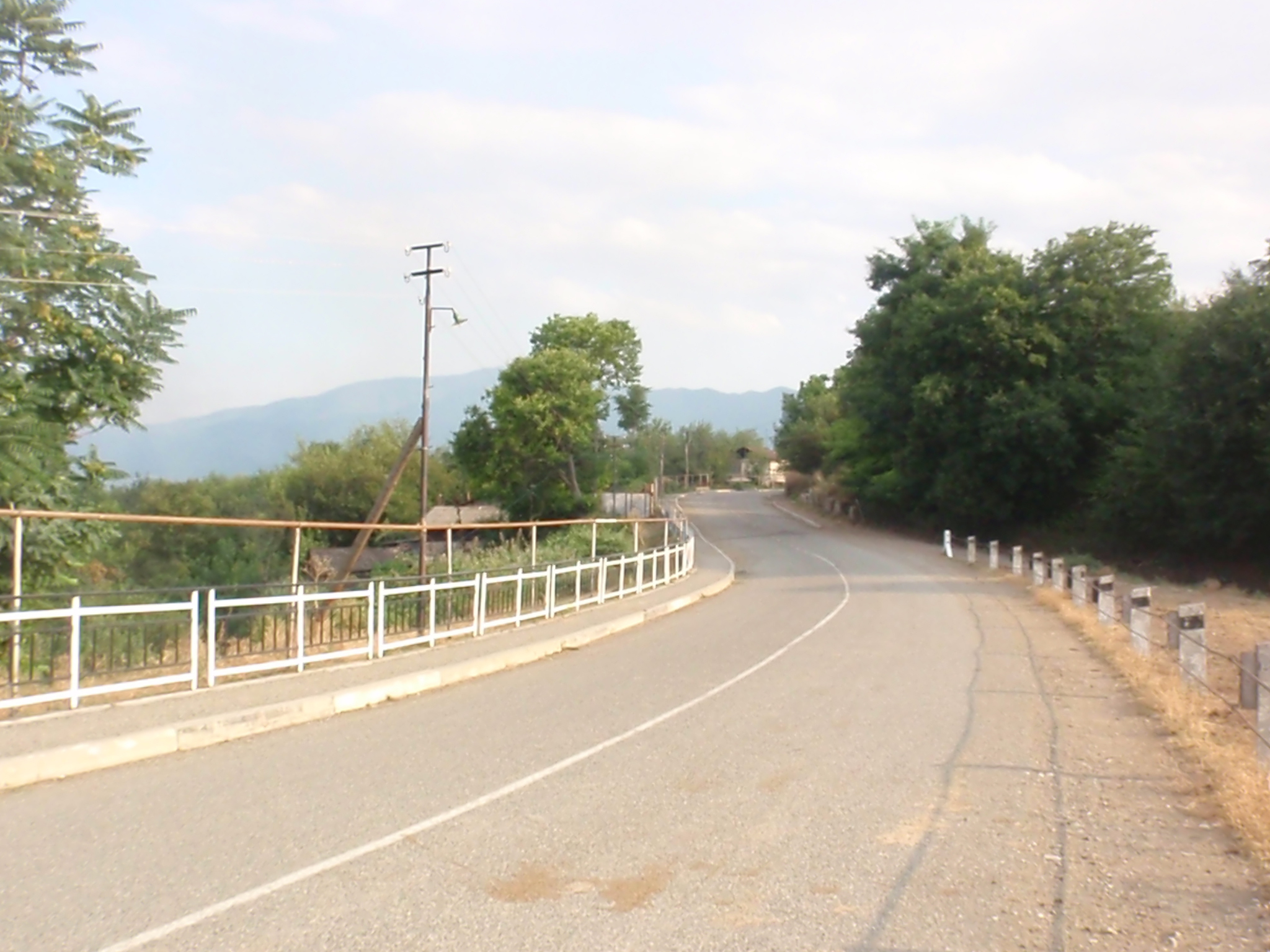

- Location within Azerbaijan Location within Karabakh Economic Region
- Coordinates: 39°37′41″N 47°00′06″E
- Country: Azerbaijan
- District: Khojavend

Population (2015)
  - Total: 450
- Time zone: UTC+4 (AZT)

Zoghalbulag (Azerbaijani: Zoğalbulaq) or Drakhtik (Armenian: Դրախտիկ, lit. 'little paradise') is a village in the Khojavend District of Azerbaijan, in the region of Nagorno-Karabakh. The village had an ethnic Armenian-majority population prior to the 2020 Nagorno-Karabakh war, and also had an Armenian majority in 1989.

== History ==
During the Soviet period, the village was part of the Hadrut District of the Nagorno-Karabakh Autonomous Oblast. After the First Nagorno-Karabakh War, the village was administrated as part of the Hadrut Province of the breakaway Republic of Artsakh. The village came under the control of Azerbaijan on 9 November 2020, during the 2020 Nagorno-Karabakh war.

== Historical heritage sites ==
Historical heritage sites in and around the village include the church of Surb Grigor Narekatsi (Armenian: Սուրբ Գրիգոր Նարեկացի, lit. 'Gregory of Narek') built in 1645, a village and cemetery from between the 17th and 19th centuries, and a 17th/18th-century khachkar.

== Demographics ==
The village had 417 inhabitants in 2005, and 450 inhabitants in 2015.
