= Karmrakuch =

Karmrakuch / Gyrmyzygaya Կարմրակուճ / Qırmızıqaya
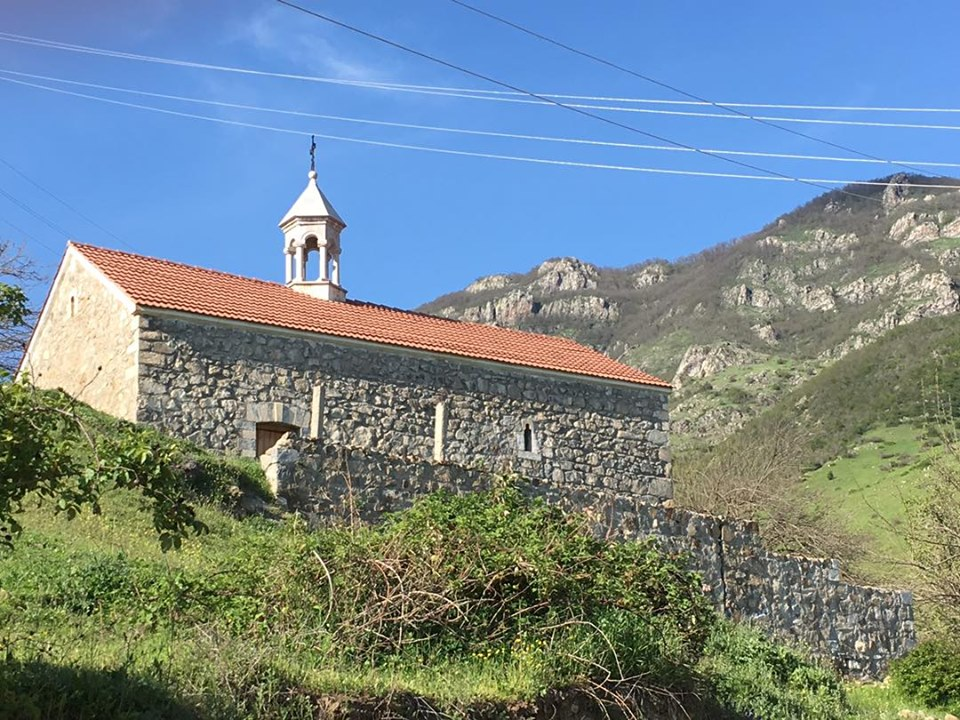
- The 19th-century Holy Savior Church in Karmrakuch

- Location within Azerbaijan
- Coordinates: 39°32′21″N 47°01′20″E
- Country: Azerbaijan
- District: Khojavend

Population (2015)
  - Total: 145
- Time zone: UTC+4 (AZT)

Karmrakuch (Armenian: Կարմրակուճ) or Gyrmyzygaya (Azerbaijani: Qırmızıqaya) is a village in the Khojavend District of Azerbaijan, in the disputed region of Nagorno-Karabakh. The village had an ethnic Armenian-majority population prior to the 2020 Nagorno-Karabakh war, and also had an Armenian majority in 1989.

== History ==
During the Soviet period, the village was part of the Hadrut District of the Nagorno-Karabakh Autonomous Oblast. After the First Nagorno-Karabakh War, the village was administrated as part of the Hadrut Province of the breakaway Republic of Artsakh. The village came under the control of Azerbaijan on 14 October 2020, during the 2020 Nagorno-Karabakh war.

== Historical heritage sites ==
Historical heritage sites in and around the village include the fortress of Vnesa (Armenian: Վնեսա), a village and khachkars from between the 10th and 12th centuries, the 19th-century church of Surb Amenaprkich (Armenian: Սուրբ Ամենափրկիչ, lit. 'Holy Savior'), and a 19th-century spring monument and cemetery.

== Demographics ==
The village had 125 inhabitants in 2005, and 145 inhabitants in 2015.

== Gallery ==
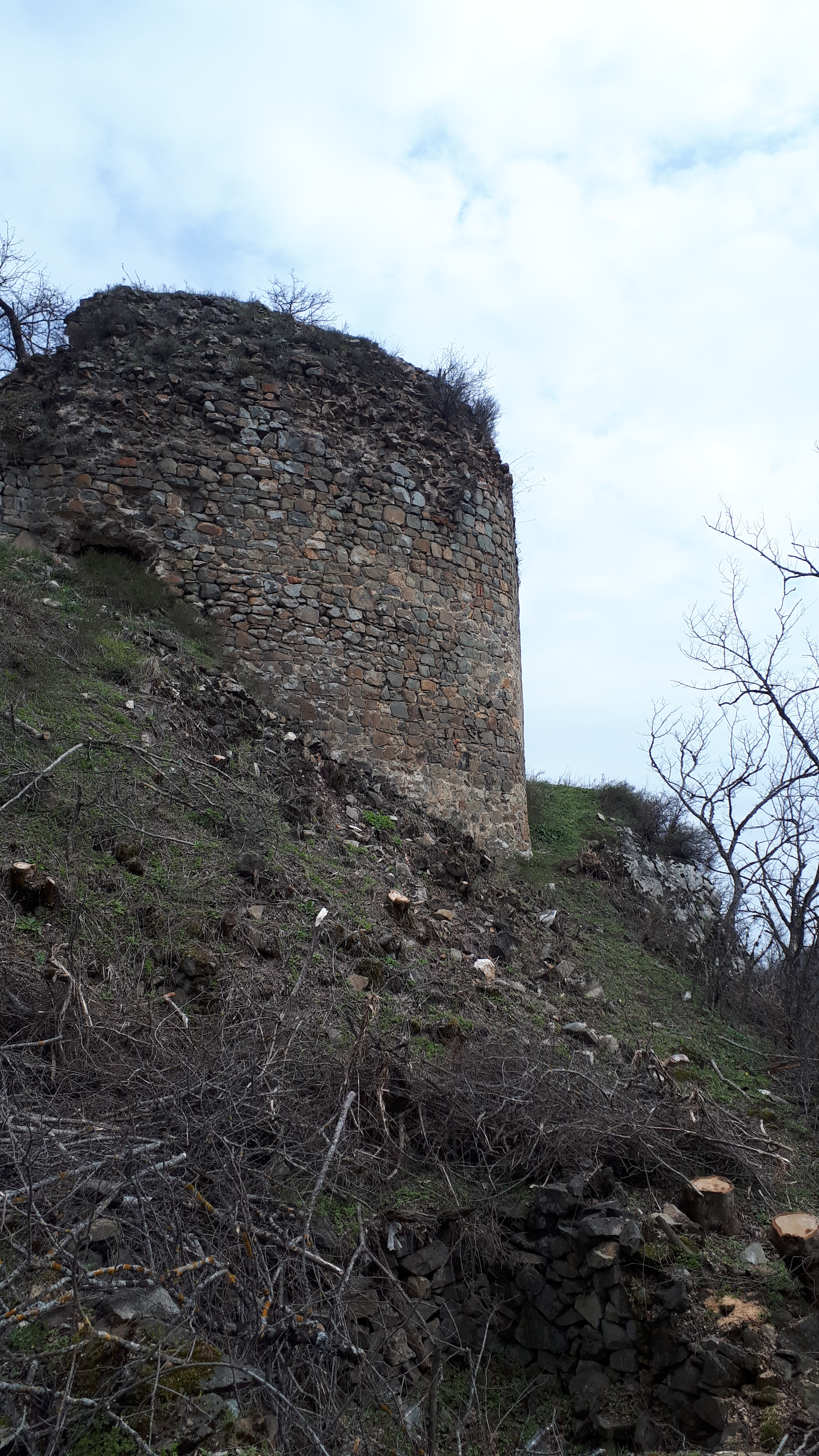
Vnesa Fortress from between the 10th and 12th centuries
