= Bulutan =

Bulutan / Pletants Բլութան / Պլեթանց
- Location within Azerbaijan
- Coordinates: 39°32′14″N 47°04′49″E
- Country: Azerbaijan
- District: Khojavend

Population (2015)
  - Total: 28
- Time zone: UTC+4 (AZT)

Bulutan (Armenian: Բլութան, romanized: Blutan) or Pletants (Armenian: Պլեթանց) is a village in the Khojavend District of Azerbaijan, in the Karabakh region of Azerbaijan. The village had an ethnic Armenian-majority population in 1989.

== History ==
During the Soviet period, the village was part of the Hadrut District of the Nagorno-Karabakh Autonomous Oblast. After the First Nagorno-Karabakh War, the village was administrated as part of the Hadrut Province of the breakaway Republic of Artsakh. The village came under the control of Azerbaijan on 14 October 2020, during the 2020 Nagorno-Karabakh war as part of the cease fire agreement.

== Historical heritage sites ==
Historical heritage sites in and around the village include St. Stephen's Church (Armenian: Սուրբ Ստեփանոս եկեղեցի, romanized: Surb Stepanos Yekeghetsi, also known as the church of Blutan, Բլութան) built in 1651, a 17th-century khachkar, a cemetery from between the 17th and 19th centuries, and a 19th-century watermill.

== Demographics ==
The village had 58 inhabitants in 2005, and 28 inhabitants in 2015.
