= Dərəkənd, Khojavend =

Derekend / Tsamdzor Dərəkənd / Ծամձոր
- Location within Azerbaijan
- Coordinates: 39°29′47″N 46°58′05″E
- Country: Azerbaijan
- District: Khojavend

Population (2015)
  - Total: 47
- Time zone: UTC+4 (AZT)

Derekend (Azerbaijani: Dərəkənd) or Tsamdzor (Armenian: Ծամձոր) is a village in the Khojavend District of Azerbaijan, in the disputed region of Nagorno-Karabakh. The village had an ethnic Armenian-majority population prior to the 2020 Nagorno-Karabakh war, and also had an Armenian majority in 1989.

== History ==
During the Soviet period, the village was part of the Hadrut District of the Nagorno-Karabakh Autonomous Oblast. After the First Nagorno-Karabakh War, the village was administrated as part of the Hadrut Province of the breakaway Republic of Artsakh. The village came under the control of Azerbaijan during the 2020 Nagorno-Karabakh war.

== Historical heritage sites ==
Historical heritage sites in and around the village include a cemetery from between the 16th and 19th centuries, the church of Surb Astvatsatsin (Armenian: Սուրբ Աստվածածին, lit. 'Holy Mother of God') built in 1696, a bridge from between the 17th and 19th centuries, and a reservoir created in the 19th century.

== Demographics ==
The village had 54 inhabitants in 2005, and 47 inhabitants in 2015.
