= Xatınbulaq =

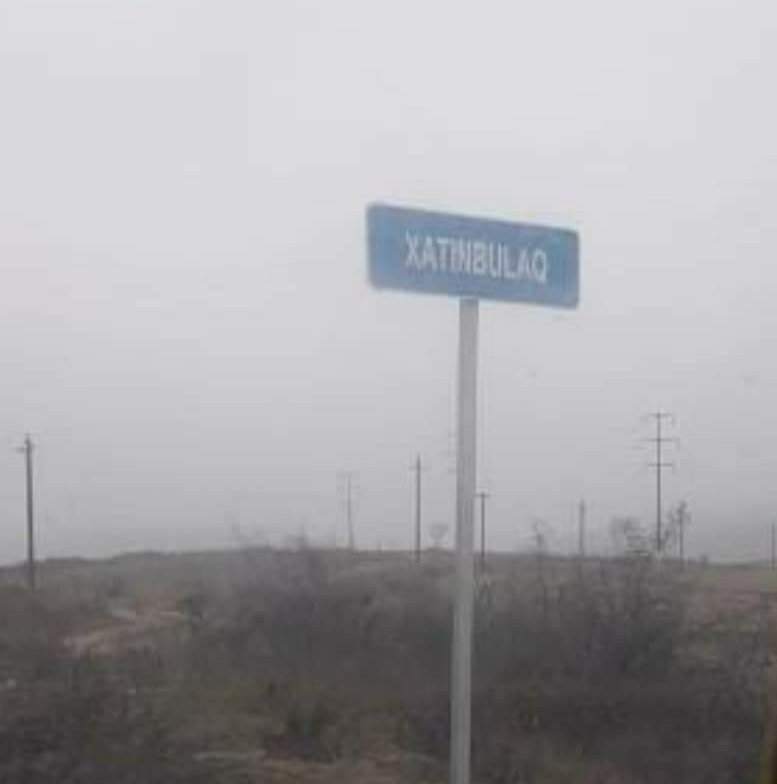

- Location within Azerbaijan
- Coordinates: 39°30′42″N 47°06′11″E
- Country: Azerbaijan
- District: Fuzuli
- Time zone: UTC+4 (AZT)

Xatınbulaq is a village in the Fuzuli District of Azerbaijan.

== History ==
The village was located in the Armenian-occupied territories surrounding Nagorno-Karabakh, coming under the control of ethnic Armenian forces in August 1993, during the First Nagorno-Karabakh War. The village subsequently became part of the breakaway Republic of Artsakh as part of its Hadrut Province. It was recaptured by Azerbaijan on 4 October 2020, during the 2020 Nagorno-Karabakh war.
