= Ağcakənd, Khojavend =

Aghjakend / Khandzadzor Ağcakənd / Խանձաձոր
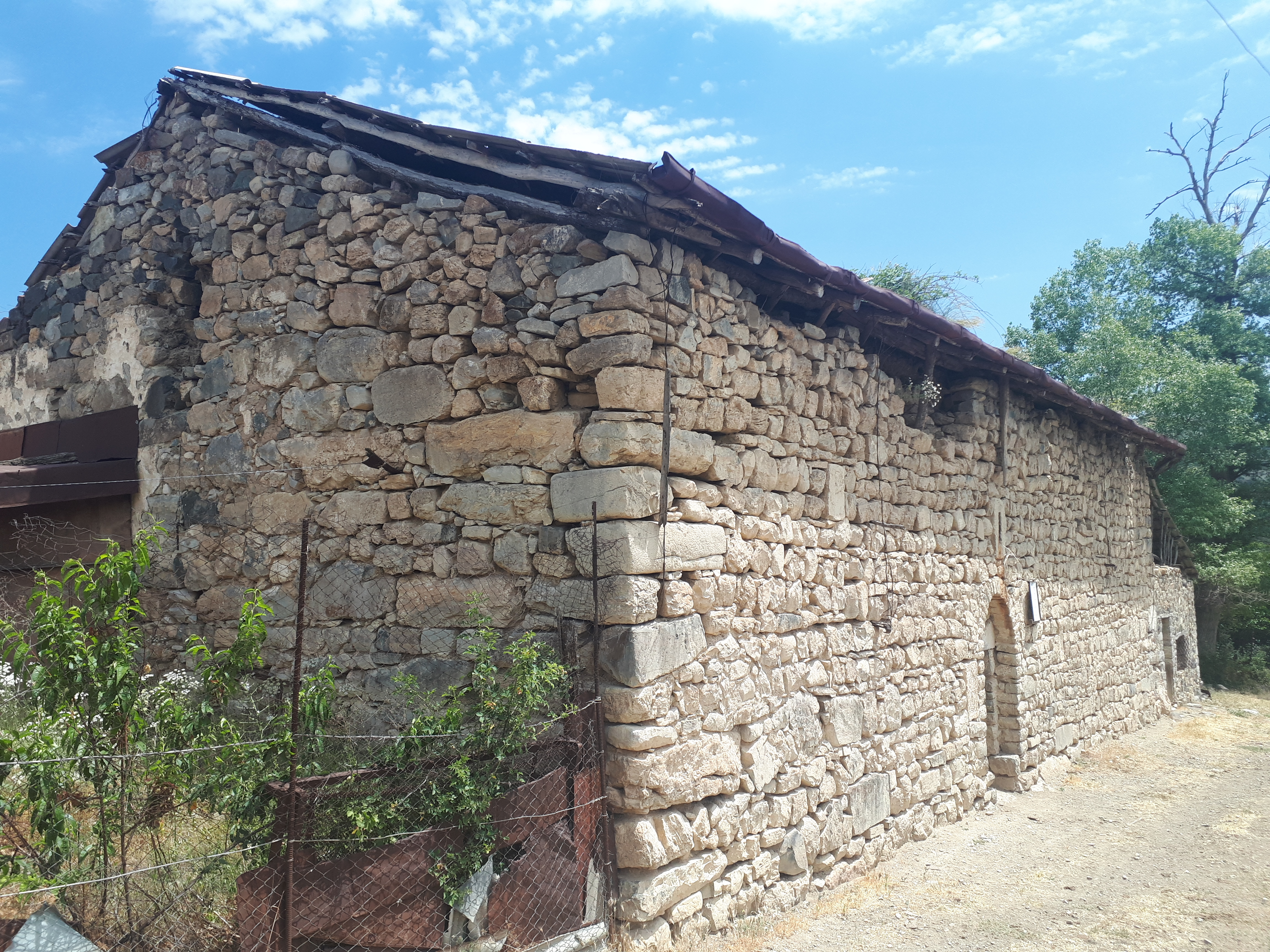

- Location within Azerbaijan
- Coordinates: 39°29′49″N 46°52′42″E
- Country: Azerbaijan
- District: Khojavend
- Elevation: 1,391 m (4,564 ft)

Population (2015)
  - Total: 122
- Time zone: UTC+4 (AZT)

Aghjakend (Azerbaijani: Ağcakənd) or Khandzadzor (Armenian: Խանձաձոր) is a village in the Khojavend District of Azerbaijan, in the disputed region of Nagorno-Karabakh. The village had an ethnic Armenian-majority population prior to the 2020 Nagorno-Karabakh war, and also had an Armenian majority in 1989.

== History ==
During the Soviet period, the village was part of the Hadrut District of the Nagorno-Karabakh Autonomous Oblast. After the First Nagorno-Karabakh War, the village was administered as part of the Hadrut Province of the breakaway Republic of Artsakh. The village came under the control of Azerbaijan on 20 October 2020, during the 2020 Nagorno-Karabakh war.

== Historical heritage sites ==
Historical heritage sites in and around the village include the church of Surb Astvatsatsin (Armenian: Սուրբ Աստվածածին, lit. 'Holy Mother of God') built in 1698, the 17th-century monastery of Katarovank (Armenian: Կատարովանք), a 17th-century khachkar, and an 18th/19th-century cemetery.

== Demographics ==
The village had 137 inhabitants in 2005, and 122 inhabitants in 2015.
