= Arajamugh =

Arajamugh Առաջամուղ
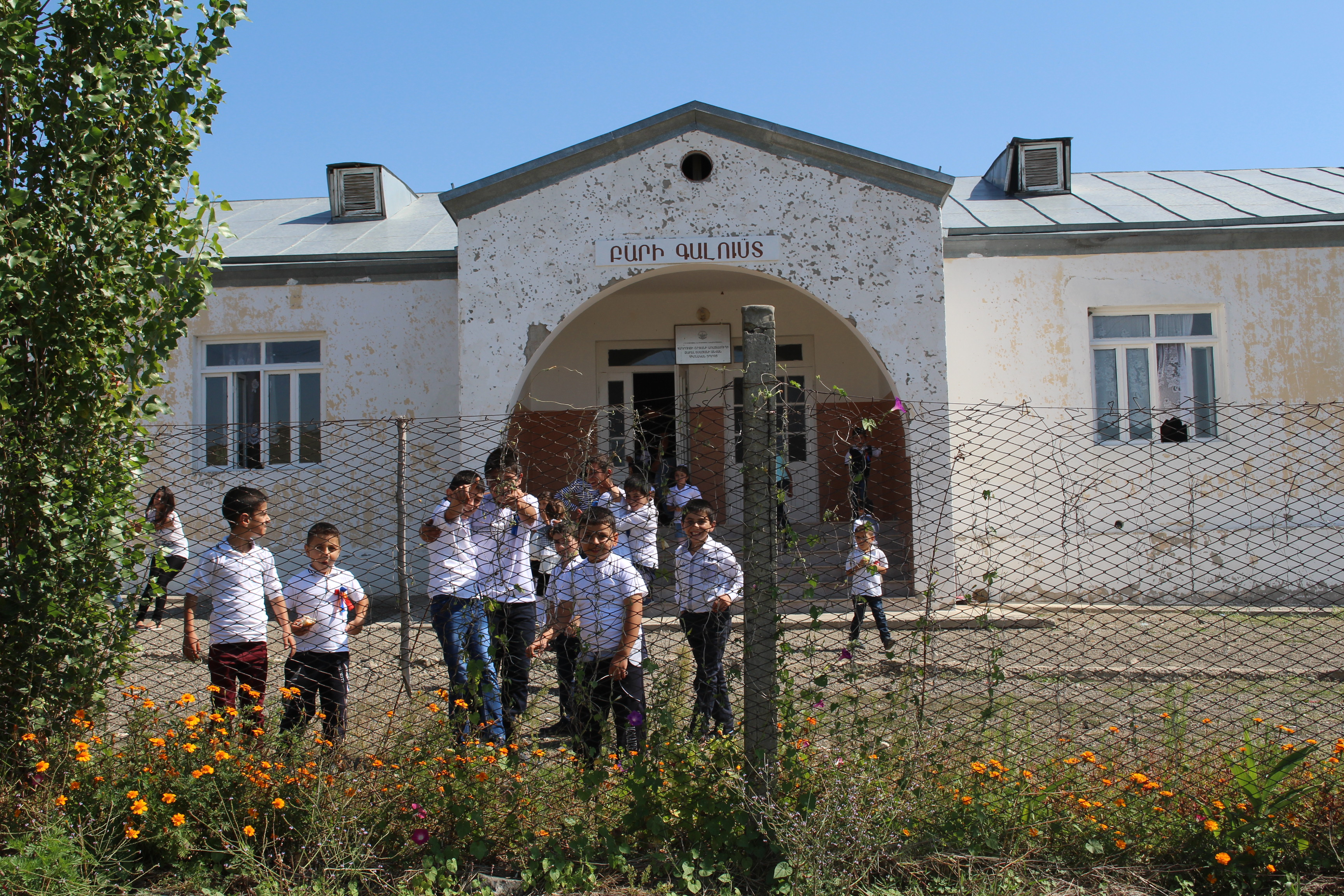
- Arajamugh school

- Location within Azerbaijan Location within East Zangezur Economic Region
- Coordinates: 39°21′32″N 47°02′04″E
- Country: Azerbaijan
- District: Jabrayil
- Established: 2004

Population (2015)
  - Total: 117
- Time zone: UTC+4 (AZT)

Arajamugh (Armenian: Առաջամուղ, also Arashamud, Առաշամուդ) is a model village in the Jabrayil District of Azerbaijan. The village had an ethnic Armenian-majority population prior to the 2020 Nagorno-Karabakh war. The village had 117 inhabitants in 2015, and the community of Arajamugh included 35 people in the village of Araksavan, 11 km from Arajamugh.

== History ==
The village was founded in 2004 by the Tufenkian Foundation, working in conjunction with the Artsakh Department of Resettlement and Refugee Affairs. As of 2014, the village features 19 houses with 85 inhabitants, including Karabakh Armenians as well as Armenian refugees from Azerbaijan. Arajamugh also features a school and possesses modern amenities - water, power lines, and gravel roads and was 5.7 km from Jabrayil.

The Tufenkian Foundation has planted 7 hectares of pomegranate orchards in the area around the village, which are now actively cultivated. The village has received support from Artsakh Fund – Eastern US. In 2015, there were renovations of facades for all houses, the village school and the mayor's office. In 2016 a new phase of house construction begun.

Arajamugh was part of the Hadrut Province of the breakaway Republic of Artsakh since the First Nagorno-Karabakh War until its recapture by Azerbaijan on 20 October 2020 during the 2020 Nagorno-Karabakh war.
