= Quşçu, Goygol =

Gushchu Կուշչի Արմավիր • Kushchi Armavir
- Municipality
- Location within Azerbaijan
- Coordinates: 40°28′33″N 46°24′20″E
- Country: Azerbaijan
- District: Goranboy

Population
  - Total: 418
- Time zone: UTC+4 (AZT)

Quşçu (Gushchu; Armenian: Կուշչի Արմավիր, romanized: Kushchi Armavir) is a village and municipality in the Goygol District of Azerbaijan. It has a population of 418. The village had an Armenian majority prior to the First Nagorno-Karabakh War and Operation Ring.
