= Üçbulaq, Fuzuli =

Üçbulaq (Heyderxan ocaqı)
- Location within Azerbaijan Location within Karabakh Economic Region
- Coordinates: 39°35′20″N 47°01′56″E
- Country: Azerbaijan
- District: Fuzuli

Population (2005)
  - Total: 4
- Time zone: UTC+4 (AZT)

Üçbulaq or Hoğa (Armenian: Հողեր, Hogher) is a village in the Fuzuli District of Azerbaijan.

== History ==
The village had an Armenian and a Muslim quarter in 1921, when 600 of the inhabitants were Armenians. It became part of the Nagorno-Karabakh Autonomous Oblast in 1923 but was ceded to the Karyagino Rayon (today Fuzuli) in 1938. The Armenian inhabitants gradually left afterwards.

The village was located in the Armenian-occupied territories surrounding Nagorno-Karabakh, coming under the control of ethnic Armenian forces during the First Nagorno-Karabakh War. The village subsequently became part of the breakaway Republic of Artsakh as part of its Hadrut Province, referred to as Hogher (Հողեր). It came under the control of Azerbaijan during the 2020 Nagorno-Karabakh war.

== Historical heritage sites ==
The village is known for the Armenian St. Astvatsatsin Church from 1880.

== Notable people ==
- Elkhan Zulfugarov — National Hero of Azerbaijan.
