= Axullu =

Akhullu / Hartashen Axullu / Հարթաշեն
- Location within Azerbaijan Location within Karabakh Economic Region
- Coordinates: 39°34′00″N 47°05′32″E
- Country: Azerbaijan
- District: Khojavend

Population (2015)
  - Total: 91
- Time zone: UTC+4 (AZT)

Akhullu (Azerbaijani: Axullu; Armenian: Հախլլու, romanized: Hakhlu) or Hartashen (Armenian: Հարթաշեն) is a village in the Khojavend District of Azerbaijan, in the disputed region of Nagorno-Karabakh. The village had an Azerbaijani-majority population prior to their expulsion during the First Nagorno-Karabakh War.

== History ==
During the Soviet period, the village was part of the Hadrut District of the Nagorno-Karabakh Autonomous Oblast. Before the Nagorno-Karabakh conflict, the village was inhabited by about 600 Azerbaijanis. On 8 January 1992, the Azerbaijani inhabitants of the village were forced to leave Akhullu due to shelling by the Armenian forces. During the First Nagorno-Karabakh War, the village came under the control of Armenian forces, on 2 October 1992. After the First Nagorno-Karabakh War, the village was administrated as part of the Hadrut Province of the breakaway Republic of Artsakh. The village came under the control of Azerbaijan during the 2020 Nagorno-Karabakh war.

== Historical heritage sites ==
Historical heritage sites in and around the village include a cemetery from between the 17th and 19th centuries.

== Demographics ==
The village had about 600 inhabitants, mostly Azerbaijani, during the Soviet period. After the First Nagorno-Karabakh war, the Azerbaijani inhabitants of the village were forced to leave the village. 101 inhabitants in 2005, and 91 inhabitants in 2015.
