= Dolanlar =

Dolanlar / Arevshat Դոլանլար / Արևշատ
- Location within Azerbaijan
- Coordinates: 39°26′43″N 46°49′52″E
- Country: Azerbaijan
- District: Khojavend

Population (2015)
  - Total: 211
- Time zone: UTC+4 (AZT)

Dolanlar (Armenian: Դոլանլար) or Arevshat (Armenian: Արևշատ) is a village in the Khojavend District of Azerbaijan, in the disputed region of Nagorno-Karabakh. The village had an ethnic Armenian-majority population prior to the 2020 Nagorno-Karabakh war, and also had an Armenian majority in 1989.

== History ==
During the Soviet period, the village was part of the Hadrut District of the Nagorno-Karabakh Autonomous Oblast. After the First Nagorno-Karabakh War, the village was administrated as part of the Hadrut Province of the breakaway Republic of Artsakh. The village was captured by Azerbaijan on 23 October 2020, during the 2020 Nagorno-Karabakh war.

== Historical heritage sites ==
Historical heritage sites in and around the village include the 9th/10th-century church of Hangats Yeghtsi (Armenian: Հանգած եղցի), a 9th/10th-century cemetery, a cemetery from between the 9th and 15th centuries, and a 12th/13th-century khachkar.

== Demographics ==
The village had 180 inhabitants in 2005, and 211 inhabitants in 2015.
