= Sor, Azerbaijan =

Sor / Tsor Սոր / Ցոր
- Location within Azerbaijan
- Coordinates: 39°29′21″N 47°01′20″E
- Country: Azerbaijan
- District: Khojavend

Population (2015)
  - Total: 20
- Time zone: UTC+4 (AZT)

Sor (Armenian: Սոր) or Tsor (Armenian: Ցոր) is a village in the Khojavend District of Azerbaijan, in the disputed region of Nagorno-Karabakh. The village had an ethnic Armenian-majority population prior to the 2020 Nagorno-Karabakh war, and also had an Armenian majority in 1989.

== History ==
During the Soviet period, the village was part of the Hadrut District of the Nagorno-Karabakh Autonomous Oblast. After the First Nagorno-Karabakh War, the village was administrated as part of the Hadrut Province of the breakaway Republic of Artsakh. The village came under the control of Azerbaijan on 9 October 2020, during the 2020 Nagorno-Karabakh war.

== Historical heritage sites ==
Historical heritage sites in and around the village include the 18th/19th-century church of Surb Amenaprkich (Armenian: Սուրբ Ամենափրկիչ, lit. 'Holy Savior').

== Demographics ==
The village had 24 inhabitants in 2005, and 20 inhabitants in 2015.
