= Arakül =

Arakul / Arakel Arakül / Առաքել
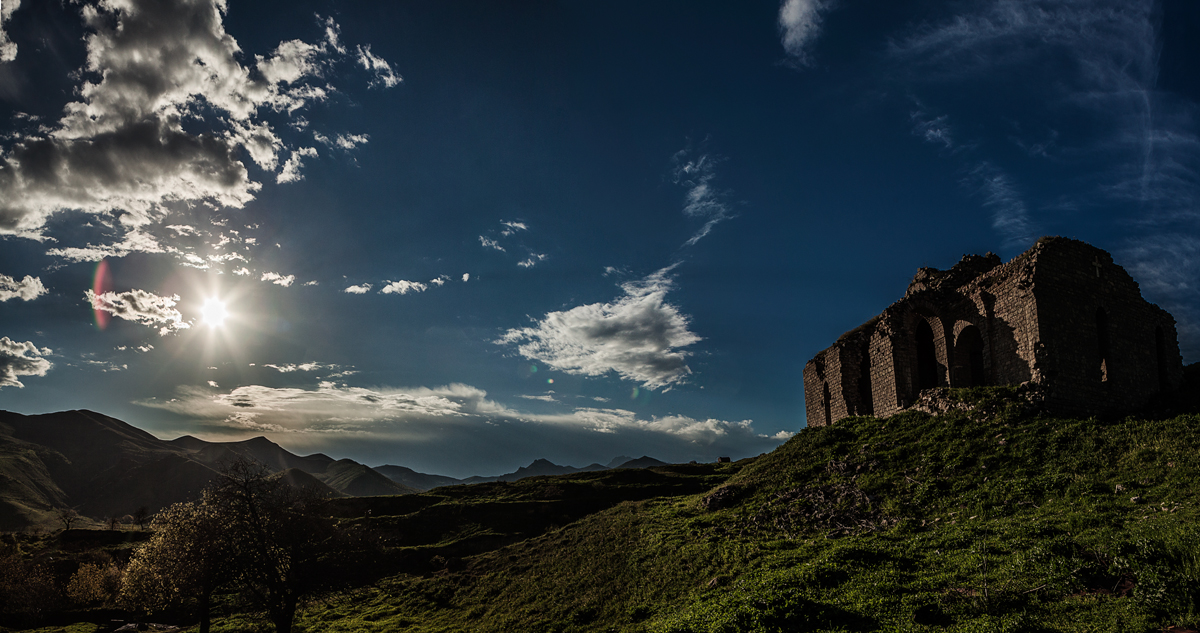
- The church of Surb Astvatsatsin in the village

- Location within Azerbaijan Location within Karabakh Economic Region
- Coordinates: 39°26′16″N 46°59′51″E
- Country: Azerbaijan
- District: Khojavend

Population (2015)
  - Total: 134
- Time zone: UTC+4 (AZT)

Arakul (Azerbaijani: Arakül, also Aragül) or Arakel (Armenian: Առաքել) is a village in the Khojavend District of Azerbaijan, in the region of Nagorno-Karabakh. The village had an ethnic Armenian-majority population prior to the 2020 Nagorno-Karabakh war, and also had an Armenian majority in 1989.

== Etymology ==
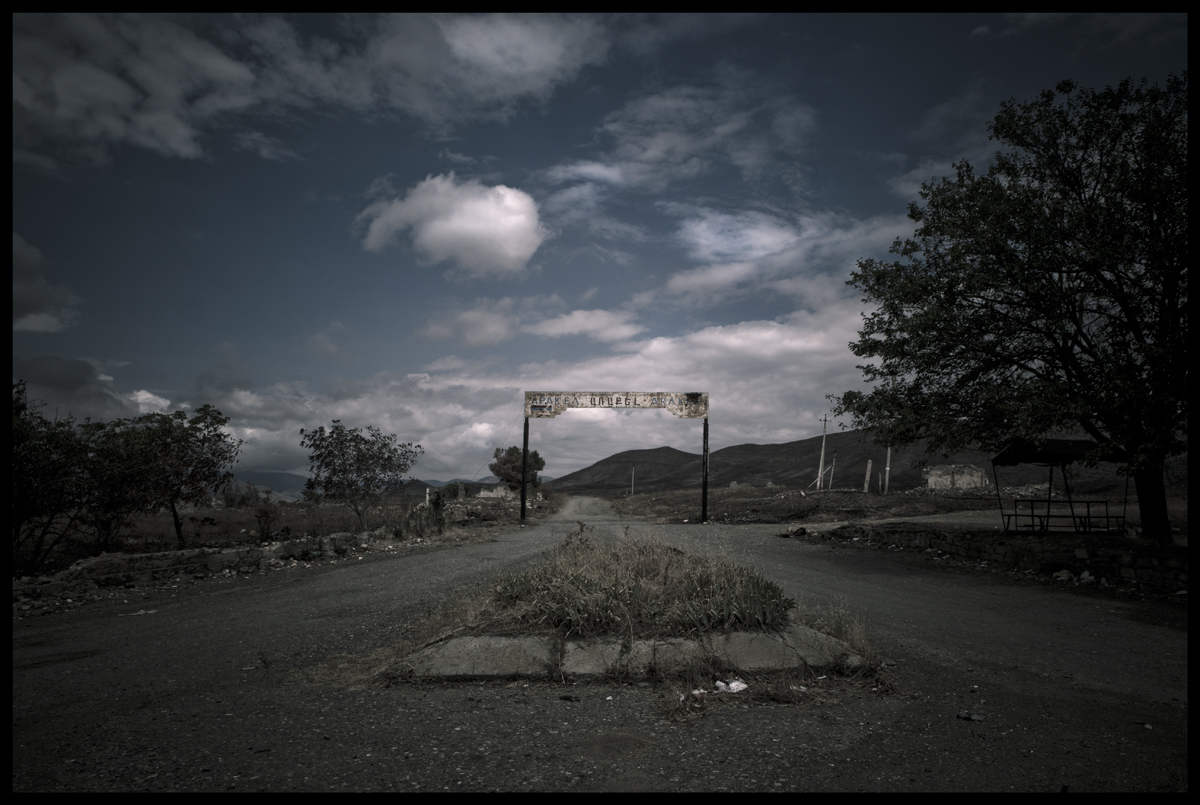
Village gate

According to local tradition, the village is named "Arakel" (which means "apostle" in Armenian) because Thaddeus (Jude the Apostle), the patron saint of the Armenian Apostolic Church, stayed in the area.

== History ==
The modern village was founded in 1828. During the Soviet period, the village was part of the Hadrut District of the Nagorno-Karabakh Autonomous Oblast. After the First Nagorno-Karabakh War, the village was administrated as part of the Hadrut Province of the breakaway Republic of Artsakh. The village was captured by Azerbaijan on 9 November 2020, during the 2020 Nagorno-Karabakh war.

In January 2021, footage of Azerbaijani soldiers destroying an Armenian cross-stone (khachkar) monument in the village was shared by the spokesperson for the Ministry of Foreign Affairs of Armenia.

== Historical heritage sites ==
Historical heritage sites in and around the village include the village of Hin Arakel (Armenian: Հին Առաքել, lit. 'Old Arakel') from between the 16th and 19th centuries, a cemetery from between the 17th and 19th centuries, and the church of Surb Astvatsatsin (Armenian: Սուրբ Աստվածածին, lit. 'Holy Mother of God') built between 1902 and 1907.

== Demographics ==
The village had 1,235 inhabitants in 1912, 106 inhabitants in 2005, and 134 inhabitants in 2015.
