= Qoçbəyli =

Gochbeyli / Aygestan Qoçbəyli / Այգեստան
- Location within Azerbaijan
- Coordinates: 39°30′26″N 47°04′10″E
- Country: Azerbaijan
- District: Khojavend

Population (2015)
  - Total: 316
- Time zone: UTC+4 (AZT)

Gochbeyli (Azerbaijani: Qoçbəyli) or Aygestan (Armenian: Այգեստան) is a village in the Khojavend District of Azerbaijan, in the disputed region of Nagorno-Karabakh. The village had an ethnic Armenian-majority population prior to the 2020 Nagorno-Karabakh war, and also had an Armenian majority in 1989.

== History ==
During the Soviet period, the village was part of the Hadrut District of the Nagorno-Karabakh Autonomous Oblast within the Azerbaijan Soviet Socialist Republic. After the First Nagorno-Karabakh War the village was administrated as part of the Hadrut Province of the breakaway Republic of Artsakh. The village came under the control of Azerbaijan during the 2020 Nagorno-Karabakh war.

== Historical heritage sites ==
Historical heritage sites in and around the village include a village from between the 15th and 19th centuries, and the Holy Resurrection Church (Armenian: Սուրբ Հարություն եկեղեցի, romanized: Surb Harutyun Yekeghetsi) built in 1741.

== Demographics ==
The village had 294 inhabitants in 2005, and 316 inhabitants in 2015.
