= Arpagədik =

Arpagadik / Arpagetik Arpagədik / Արփագետիկ
- Location within Azerbaijan Location within Karabakh Economic Region
- Coordinates: 39°33′20″N 46°42′24″E
- Country: Azerbaijan
- District: Khojavend

Population (2015)
  - Total: 24
- Time zone: UTC+4 (AZT)

Arpagadik (Azerbaijani: Arpagədik) or Arpagetik (Armenian: Արփագետիկ) is a village in the Khojavend District of Azerbaijan, in the region of Nagorno-Karabakh. The village had an ethnic Armenian-majority population prior to the 2020 Nagorno-Karabakh war.

== Toponymy ==
The village was historically also known as Karing (Armenian: Քարինգ).

== History ==
During the Soviet period, the village was part of the Hadrut District of the Nagorno-Karabakh Autonomous Oblast. After the First Nagorno-Karabakh War, the village was administrated as part of the Hadrut Province of the Republic of Artsakh. The village was captured by Azerbaijan during the 2020 Nagorno-Karabakh war.

== Demographics ==
The village had 24 inhabitants in 2015.
