= Cilən =

Jilan / Saralanj Cilən / Սարալանջ
- Location within Azerbaijan
- Coordinates: 39°26′09″N 46°58′11″E
- Country: Azerbaijan
- District: Khojavend

Population (2015)
  - Total: 27
- Time zone: UTC+4 (AZT)

Jilan (Azerbaijani: Cilən) or Saralanj (Armenian: Սարալանջ) is a village in the Khojavend District of Azerbaijan, in the disputed region of Nagorno-Karabakh. The village had an ethnic Armenian-majority population prior to the 2020 Nagorno-Karabakh war, and also had an Armenian majority in 1989.

== History ==
During the Soviet period, the village was part of the Hadrut District of the Nagorno-Karabakh Autonomous Oblast. After the First Nagorno-Karabakh War, the village was administrated as part of the Hadrut Province of the breakaway Republic of Artsakh. The village came under the control of Azerbaijan during the 2020 Nagorno-Karabakh war.

== Demographics ==
The village had 28 inhabitants in 2005, and 27 inhabitants in 2015.
