= Govşatlı =

- Location within Azerbaijan
- Coordinates: 39°36′57″N 47°03′41″E
- Country: Azerbaijan
- District: Fuzuli
- Time zone: UTC+4 (AZT)

Govşatlı (also Govshatlu, Govshatly, Qovşatlı and Kovshat) is a village in the Fuzuli District of Azerbaijan.
