= Hadrut Province =

Coordinates: 39.5167°N 47.0300°E

Hadrut Հադրութ
- Province
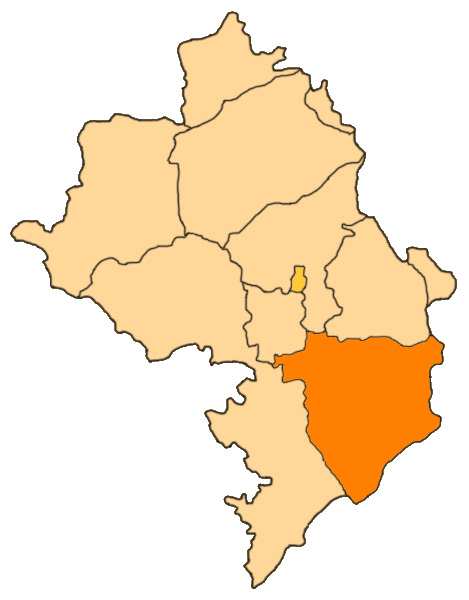
- Country: Republic of Artsakh
- Disestablishment: November 2020
- Seat: Hadrut

Government
  - Governor: Valery Gevorkian (before 2020)

Area
  - Total: 1,877 km^{2} (725 sq mi)
  - Rank: Ranked 2nd

Population (2013)
  - Total: 13,163
  - Rank: Ranked 5th
  - Density: 7.013/km^{2} (18.16/sq mi)
- FIPS 10-4: Azer
- Website: Hadrut Province

Hadrut Province (Armenian: Հադրութի շրջան) was a province of the Republic of Artsakh. The provincial capital was Hadrut city. The last governor was Valery Gevorkian. The province was captured by the armed forces of the Republic of Azerbaijan during the 2020 Nagorno-Karabakh war.

It consisted of most of the Jabrayil District, the western part of the Fuzuli District as well as the southwestern part of the Khojavend District.

== History ==
More than 340 people of Hadrut Region fell victim during the First Nagorno-Karabakh War.

During the 2020 Nagorno-Karabakh conflict, heavy fighting took place in and around the city of Hadrut. Independent sources confirmed that the Azerbaijani army took control of the city of Hadrut on either 14 or 15 October 2020. Following the Aras Valley campaign and the Battle of Shusha, all of Hadrut Province was captured by the Azerbaijan Army by 9 November 2020. A peacekeeping contingent of the Russian Federation was placed along the frontline.

== Geography ==
Hadrut Province formed the breakaway Republic of Artsakh's southern border and is one of its most mountainous parts. Villages were primarily found along two river valleys and scattered in lower elevations on the very southern fringe. Excavations of the Azokh Cave showed that humans have inhabited this area for tens of thousands of years, and the region has a rich history.

Hadrut province had 30 communities of which one was considered urban and 29 were rural. The most important problems were drinking and irrigation water, and internal communication roads. Some villages were lacking a telephone network and some had difficulties with watching Armenian TV channels. Nearly 30% of its area has been ruined and burnt several times.

== Settlements ==
- Aknaghbyur
- Arajamugh
- Arakel
- Arpagetik
- Arevshat
- Aygestan
- Azykh
- Banadzor
- Jrakus
- Drakhtik
- Dzoragyugh
- Hadrut (capital)
- Hakaku
- Hartashen
- Hin Tagher
- Hogher
- Ijevanatun

- Jraberd
- Jrakan
- Karaglukh
- Karmrakuch
- Khalynbulakh
- Khandzadzor
- Khtsaberd
- Kovshat
- Kyuratagh
- Mariamadzor
- Melikashen
- Mets Tagher
- Mokhrenes
- Norashen
- Petrosashen
- Pletants

- Saralanj
- Sarinshen
- Spitakashen
- Taghaser
- Taghut
- Togh
- Tumi
- Tsaghkavank
- Tsakuri
- Tsamdzor
- Tsor
- Tyak
- Ukhtadzor
- Vank
- Varanda
- Vardashat

== Sites of interest ==
The Hadrut Regional Hospital

- Monastery of Spitak Khatch (Սպիտակ Խաչ; White Cross), 14th century
- Gtichavank monastery (Գտիչի վանք), 1241–1248
- Anapat Church (Անապատ եկեղեցի), 13th century, near the village of Togh (Տող)
- Khodaafarin Bridges

== See also ==
- Dizak
- Arajamugh
