= Hadrut District (NKAO) =

District of the Azerbaijan Soviet Socialist Republic

Coordinates: 39°31′00″N 47°01′48″E

- District
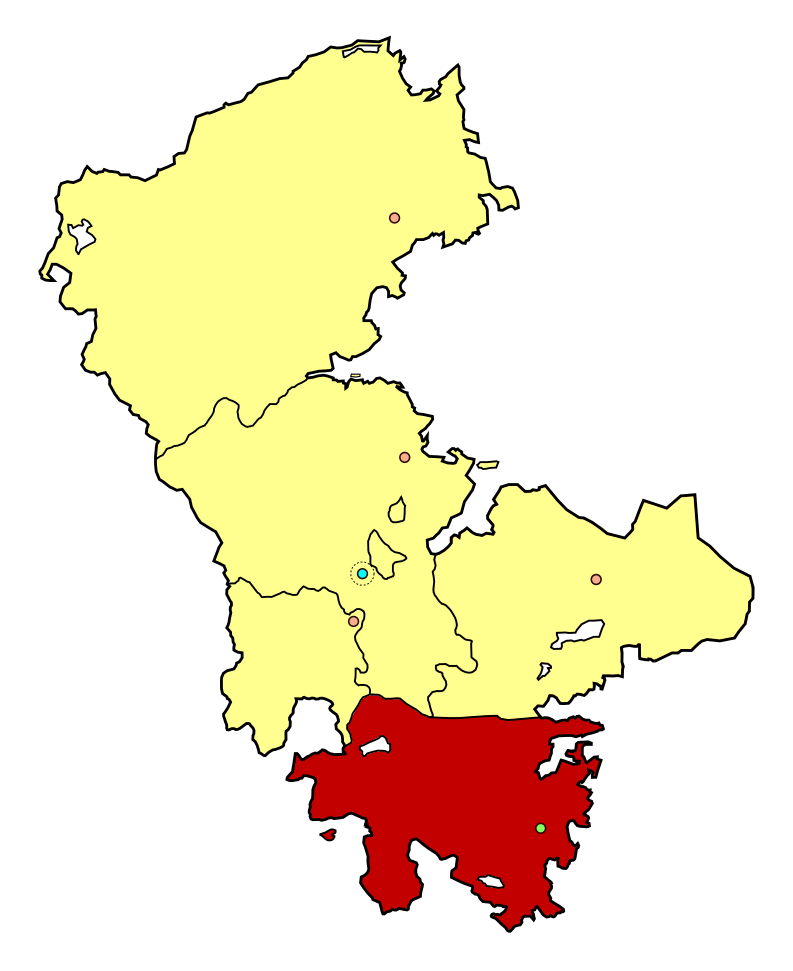
- Map of Hadrut within NKAO
- Autonomous region: (Azerbaijan Soviet Socialist Republic) Nagorno-Karabakh Autonomous Oblast
- Country: Azerbaijan SSR
- Established: 8 August 1930
- Abolished: 26 November 1991
- Capital: Hadrut

Area
  - Total: 679 km^{2} (262 sq mi)

Population (1986)
  - Total: 14,200

Hadrut District (Azerbaijani: Hadrut rayonu; Armenian: Հադրութի շրջան, romanized: Hadrowt'i shrjan) was an administrative unit within the former Nagorno-Karabakh Autonomous Oblast (NKAO) of the Azerbaijan Soviet Socialist Republic.

== History ==
The district was formed on 8 August 1930, as the Dizak district; it was renamed Hadrut District on 17 September 1939. The administrative center of the district was the town of Hadrut.

The total area of the district was 679 km^{2} and it included 41 villages (1986).

Along with NKAO, the district was abolished on 26 November 1991 and was incorporated into Khojavend District of Azerbaijan.

Following the First Nagorno-Karabakh war, the former district came under the control of the self-proclaimed Republic of Artsakh and was incorporated into its Hadrut Province. However, during the 2020 Nagorno-Karabakh war, Azerbaijan recaptured the town of Hadrut during the Battle of Hadrut, followed by the whole of the district.

== Demographics ==
| Year | Population | Ethnic groups | Source |
|---|---|---|---|
| 1926 | 25,247 | 97.8% Armenians, 1.8% Azerbaijanis, 0.3% Russians | Soviet Census |
| 1939 | 27,128 | 95.7% Armenians, 2.7% Azerbaijanis, 1.3% Russians | Soviet Census |
| 1959 | 16,808 | 93.3% Armenians, 6.1% Azerbaijanis, 0.4% Russians | Soviet Census |
| 1970 | 15,937 | 87.5% Armenians, 10.4% Azerbaijanis, 0.9% Russians | Soviet Census |
| 1979 | 14,792 | 84.4% Armenians, 15.1% Azerbaijanis, 0.3% Russians | Soviet Census |
