= Deaths in November 1991 =

The following is a list of notable deaths in November 1991.

Entries for each day are listed alphabetically by surname. A typical entry lists information in the following sequence:

- Name, age, country of citizenship at birth, subsequent country of citizenship (if applicable), reason for notability, cause of death (if known), and reference.

== November 1991 ==
=== 1 ===
- Mary Ainslee, 77, American film actress.
- Amedeo Bruni, 85, Italian Olympic sports shooter (1932).
- Fernand Brunner, 71, Swiss philosopher.
- Moisés Carmona, 79, Mexican Roman Catholic bishop.
- Richard Hoppin, 78, American musicologist.
- Tamaz Namgalauri, 34, Soviet Georgian Olympic judoka (1980).
- Arun Paudwal, 47, Indian Bollywood film score composer.
- Earl Witte, 84, American football player (Green Bay Packers).

=== 2 ===
- Irwin Allen, 75, American film producer (The Poseidon Adventure, The Towering Inferno), heart attack.
- Yosef Almogi, 81, Israeli politician.
- Jimmy Hull, 74, American basketball player, heart attack.
- Vladimír Kudrna, 67, Czech Olympic sports shooter (1960, 1964).
- Hannes Messemer, 67, German actor, heart attack.
- Francisco Moreira, 76, Portuguese football player.
- Mort Shuman, 52, American songwriter and pianist, cancer.
- Richard C. Thomas, 54, American politician, throat cancer.
- Frank Willis, 76, Canadian Olympic canoeist (1936).

=== 3 ===
- Finn Alnæs, 59, Norwegian novelist.
- Chris Bender, 19, American R&B singer.
- Birendra Krishna Bhadra, 86, Indian radio broadcaster, playwright, actor, and narrator.
- Raymond Blackburn, 76, British politician.
- Ray Collins, 64, American gridiron football player (San Francisco 49ers, New York Giants, Dallas Texans).
- Giancarlo Luzzani, 79, Swiss Olympic field hockey player (1936).
- P. Narendranath, 57, Indian author.
- John Sandwith Boys Smith, 90, British academic.
- Marinus Valentijn, 91, Dutch road bicycle racer.
- Roman Wilhelmi, 55, Polish theatre and film actor, liver cancer.

=== 4 ===
- Mohideen Baig, 71, Sri Lankan musician.
- Roger E. Broggie, 83, American mechanical engineer.
- Cliff Keen, 90, American wrestling coach.
- Hermann Kutschera, 88, Austrian architect.
- Arthur Nord, 93, Norwegian wrestler and Olympian (1924, 1928).

=== 5 ===
- Bill Atkins, 56, American gridiron football player.
- Maurice V. Brady, 87, American politician.
- Bill Cronin, 47, American gridiron football player (Philadelphia Eagles, Miami Dolphins).
- Lloyd Fletcher, 76, American judge.
- Roy Garforth, 73, British Olympic water polo player (1948).
- Kenneth Archibald Harrison, 90, Canadian mycologist.
- Fred MacMurray, 83, American actor (Double Indemnity, My Three Sons, The Shaggy Dog), pneumonia.
- Robert Maxwell, 68, Czechoslovak-British media tycoon, politician and fraudster, heart attack combined with accidental drowning.
- Russell McInnes, 78, Australian rules footballer.
- Alfred Skrobisch, 78, American Olympic fencer (1952).

=== 6 ===
- Veniamin Alexandrov, 54, Soviet Olympic ice hockey player (1960, 1964, 1968).
- Harriet Bland, 76, American Olympic sprinter (1936).
- Oreste Corbatta, 55, Argentine footballer.
- Fred Gilby, 84, Australian rules footballer.
- Kemal Horulu, 65, Turkish Olympic sprinter (1948, 1952), and pornographic film director.
- Robert William Porter, 65, American district judge (United States District Court for the Northern District of Texas).
- Oskar Thierbach, 82, German road bicycle racer.
- Gene Tierney, 70, American actress (Leave Her to Heaven, Laura), emphysema.
- André Vandernoot, 64, Belgian conductor.
- Giannis Vazos, 77, Greek football player.

=== 7 ===
- Valery Aleksyev, 62, Soviet and Russian anthropologist.
- Franc Červan, 55, Yugoslav Olympic long-distance runner (1964).
- Tom of Finland, 71, Finnish artist, emphysema.
- Ralph Harvey, 90, American politician, member of the United States House of Representatives (1947-1959, 1961-1966).
- Vilhelm Hellman, 68, Swedish Olympic ski jumper (1948).
- Ed Marlo, 78, American magician.
- Maxine Mitchell, 74, American Olympic fencer (1952, 1956, 1960, 1968).
- Gaston Monnerville, 94, French politician and lawyer, cancer.
- Ishak Haji Muhammad, 81, Malaysian writer.
- Francisc Nemeș, 84, Romanian Olympic sprinter (1936).
- Guillermo "Willy" Oddó, 48, Chilean musician, murdered.

=== 8 ===
- Hardy Brown, 67, American football player, dementia.
- Frances Faye, 79, American singer.
- Albert Hayhurst, 86, English cricketer.
- John Kirkpatrick, 86, American pianist and musical scholar.
- Charlotte Moorman, 57, American cellist, performance artist, and avant-gardist, breast cancer.
- Dave Rowbotham, 33, English rock musician, murdered.
- Billy Savidan, 89, New Zealand long distance runner and Olympian (1932).

=== 9 ===
- Jana Dítětová, 65, Czech film actress.
- Lance Hayward, 75, Bermudan-American jazz pianist, pneumonia.
- Hans Liljedahl, 78, Swedish Olympic sports shooter (1952, 1956).
- Yves Montand, 70, Italian-French actor and singer, heart attack.
- John Newton, 71, New Zealand rugby player.
- Ralph Moses Paiewonsky, 84, United States Virgin Islands politician.
- Laurie Wilkinson, 87, Australian politician.
- Abe Yourist, 82, Russian-American basketball player.

=== 10 ===
- Dick the Bruiser, 62, American professional wrestler and football player (Green Bay Packers), internal bleeding.
- Gunnar Gren, 71, Swedish football player and Olympian (1948).
- Colin Johnstone, 70, New Zealand Olympic rower (1952, 1956).
- Tutte Lemkow, 73, Norwegian actor (Raiders of the Lost Ark, Fiddler on the Roof, Doctor Who), leukemia.
- Alessandro Lessona, 100, Italian politician.
- Ernest Mallinson, 93, English cricketer, British Indian Army officer.
- Robert Baird McClure, 90, Canadian physician and medical missionary to Asia.
- Florian Radu, 71, Romanian football player.
- Montserrat Roig, 45, Spanish writer, breast cancer.
- Vishnuprasad Trivedi, 92, Indian literary critic.
- Curt Weibull, 105, Swedish historian, educator and author.

=== 11 ===
- John Balfanz, 51, American ski jumper and Olympian (1964, 1968).
- Heinz Becker, 76, German-American baseball player (Chicago Cubs, Cleveland Indians).
- Billy Behan, 80, Irish football player and manager.
- Nellie Halstead, 81, English track and field athlete and Olympic medalist (1932).
- Collins Jones, 69, American baseball player.
- Cananea Reyes, 54, Mexican baseball player and manager.
- Nadezhda Shteinmiller, 76, Soviet artist.
- Tom Skinner, 82, New Zealand politician and trade union leader.
- Morton Stevens, 62, American film and television composer (Hawaii Five-O), Emmy winner (1970, 1974), cancer.

=== 12 ===
- Diane Brewster, 60, American actress, heart failure (Leave It to Beaver, Maverick, The Fugitive), heart failure.
- Ravishing Ripper Collins, 58, American professional wrestler, melanoma.
- Bobby Joe Edmonds, 50, American basketball player (Indiana Pacers).
- Keizō Hayashi, 84, Japanese civil servant and general officer.
- Bruce Hubbard, 39, American operatic baritone, pneumonia.
- Gabriele Tinti, 59, Italian actor, heart attack.
- Tom Wukovits, 75, American basketball player.

=== 13 ===
- Hanson W. Baldwin, 88, American journalist.
- Henryk Borowski, 81, Polish theater, radio and film actor.
- Leo Carbol, 83, Canadian ice hockey player (Chicago Black Hawks).
- Paul-Émile Léger, 87, Canadian Roman Catholic cardinal, pneumonia.
- Maurice Mercery, 89, French footballer.
- Walter Ulbrich, 81, German film producer.
- Georges Winckelmans, 81, French football player and coach.

=== 14 ===
- Constantin Chiriță, 66, Romanian writer.
- William Nyrén, 71, Norwegian actor.
- Tony Richardson, 63, English film director (Tom Jones, Look Back in Anger, A Taste of Honey), Oscar winner (1964), AIDS.
- Bryden Thomson, 63, Scottish conductor, cancer.
- Yoshikata Yoda, 82, Japanese screenwriter.

=== 15 ===
- Doris Marie Bender, 79, American social worker.
- Patricia Black, 18, Northern Irish volunteer in the IRA, bombing accident.
- Jack Franklin, 72, American baseball player (Brooklyn Dodgers).
- Sylvio Hoffmann, 83, Brazilian football player.
- V. S. Huzurbazar, 72, Indian statistician from Kolhapur.
- Robert McCall, 33, Canadian ice dancer and Olympian (1984, 1988), brain cancer.
- Jacques Morali, 44, French music producer (Village People), AIDS.
- Stan Noszka, 71, American basketball player (Boston Celtics), and politician.
- George Simms, 81, Archbishop in the Church of Ireland.

=== 16 ===
- Bill Dodd, 81, American lawyer and politician.
- Maya Dolas, 25, Indian mobster, ballistic trauma.
- Alberto Girri, 71, Argentine poet and writer.
- Margaret Pease Harper, 80, American educator, musician and civic leader.
- Ralph Marrero, 33, American actor (Day of the Dead), traffic collision.
- José Miguel Olguín, 86, Chilean Olympic footballer (1928).
- Gustav Wetterström, 80, Swedish football striker.

=== 17 ===
- Eileen Agar, 91, British-Argentinian painter and photographer.
- Maurice Banach, 24, German footballer, traffic collision.
- Smead Jolley, 89, American baseball player (Chicago White Sox, Boston Red Sox).
- Kafunga, 77, Brazilian football player.
- Frank Kosikowski, 65, American gridiron football player (Cleveland Browns).
- Horst Mühlmann, 51, German footballer and American football player (Cincinnati Bengals, Philadelphia Eagles).
- Adrian Quist, 78, Australian tennis player.
- William Strickland, 77, American conductor and organist, lung cancer.
- Kelly Jean Van Dyke, 33, American actress, suicide by hanging.
- Jack Vinall, 70, Australian rules footballer.

=== 18 ===
- Claude Cahen, 82, French marxist orientalist and historian.
- Gustáv Husák, 78, Czechoslovak politician, president (1975–1989).
- Fritz Köpke, 89, German Olympic high jumper (1928).
- Reg Parlett, 87, English artist.
- J. P. Stern, 70, Austrian-British literary scholar.
- Alexey Tryoshnikov, 77, Soviet polar explorer.
- Eugen York, 78, German film director.

=== 19 ===
- Les Eyre, 69, English footballer.
- Xian Henghan, 80, Chinese lieutenant general and politician.
- Zi'ang Hu, 94, Chinese politician.
- Michael Lyons, 81, Irish Fine Gael politician.
- Alan McLaughlin, 71, Australian rules footballer.
- Reggie Nalder, 84, Austrian actor, bone cancer.
- Leonid Obolensky, 89, Russian and Soviet actor.
- Luis Sarria, 80, Cuban-American boxer.
- Jackie Stamps, 72, English football player.
- Dick Weber, 72, American football player (Detroit Lions).

=== 20 ===
- Yulia Drunina, 67, Soviet poet, suicide.
- Siniša Glavašević, 31, Croatian reporter, homicide.
- Helga Hahnemann, 54, East German German actress, comedian and singer.
- Arthur Charles Hind, 86, Indian Olympic field hockey player (1932).
- Kåre Kivijärvi, 53, Norwegian photographer.
- Jean-Michel Nicolier, 25, French military volunteer, killed in the Vukovar massacre.
- Antun Stipančić, 42, Croatian table tennis player, heart attack.
- Zdeněk Tikal, 62, Czech-born Australian Olympic ice hockey player (1960).
- Notable Azerbaijans killed in 1991 Azerbaijani Mil Mi-8 shootdown:
  - Mahammad Asadov, 49, Minister of Internal Affairs, State Advisor
  - Ismat Gayibov, 49, Public Prosecutor General
  - Zulfi Hajiyev, 56, Deputy Prime Minister
  - Tofik Ismailov, 58, Secretary of State.
  - Vagif Jafarov, 42, Member of Parliament
  - Osman Mirzayev, 54, Head of Presidential Administration, journalist
  - Ali Mustafayev, 39, Television journalist
  - Saylau Serikov, 50, Deputy Minister of Internal Affairs
  - Fakhraddin Shahbazov, 41, Cameraman

=== 21 ===
- T. S. Avinashilingam Chettiar, 88, Indian politician.
- Joseph Delaney, 87, American artist.
- Ernest Dichter, 84, American psychologist and marketing expert.
- George Dougherty, 77, Australian rules footballer.
- Prior Jones, 74, Trinidadian cricket player.
- Robert Kaufman, 60, American screenwriter, film producer and television writer.
- Vic Krafft, 72, American basketball player.
- Daniel Mann, 79, American film director (Come Back, Little Sheba, BUtterfield 8, Our Man Flint), heart failure.
- Bryan Stephens, 71, American baseball player (Cleveland Indians, St. Louis Browns).
- Wes Trainor, 69, Canadian ice hockey player (New York Rangers).
- Sonny Werblin, 81, American sports executive (New York Jets), heart attack.
- John Whedon, 86, American television writer (The Donna Reed Show, The Dick Van Dyke Show, The Andy Griffith Show).
- Hans Zassenhaus, 79, German mathematician.

=== 22 ===
- Antoine Berman, 49, French translator, philosopher, and historian.
- Ullrich Haupt, Jr., 76, American-German actor.
- Tadashi Imai, 79, Japanese film director.
- Yevgeni Ivanovski, 73, Soviet general.
- John Magee, 68, American gridiron football player (Philadelphia Eagles).
- Max Smethurst, 76, Australian rules footballer.
- Roy Zimmerman, 78, American baseball player (New York Giants).

=== 23 ===
- Klaus Kinski, 65, German actor (Aguirre, the Wrath of God, Nosferatu the Vampyre, For a Few Dollars More), heart attack.
- Stanley Rimington, 99, Australian cricket player.
- Ernesto Rivera, 77, Puerto Rican Olympic sports shooter (1952)
- Ken Uehara, 82, Japanese actor.

=== 24 ===
- Eric Carr, 41, American drummer (Kiss), heart cancer.
- Alex Colthirst, 73, Panamanian baseball player.
- Anton Furst, 47, English production designer (Batman, Full Metal Jacket, Awakenings), Oscar winner (1990), suicide by jumping.
- Freddie Mercury, 45, British singer (Queen) and songwriter ("Bohemian Rhapsody", "We Are the Champions"), AIDS.
- Carl Sawatski, 64, American baseball player and executive.

=== 25 ===
- Raymond Andrews, 57, American novelist, suicide.
- Eleanor Audley, 86, American actress (Sleeping Beauty, Cinderella, Green Acres), respiratory failure.
- Sembiin Gonchigsumlaa, 72, Mongolian composer.
- Doula Mouriki, 57, Greek byzantinologist and art historian.
- Jimmy Strausbaugh, 73, American gridiron football player (Chicago Cardinals).
- Charles Wagley, 78, American anthropologist, lung cancer.

=== 26 ===
- Dehl Berti, 70, American actor, heart attack.
- François Billetdoux, 64, French novelist.
- Enzo Cerusico, 54, Italian actor (La Dolce Vita), cancer.
- Ed Heinemann, 83, American aeronautical engineer.
- Bob Johnson, 60, American ice hockey coach (Pittsburgh Penguins), brain cancer.
- Gertrud Pålson-Wettergren, 94, Swedish singer.

=== 27 ===
- George Edwards, 67, American film producer and writer.
- Vilém Flusser, 71, Czech-Brazilian philosopher, struck by vehicle.
- Grete Lainer, 77, Austrian Olympic figure skater (1936).
- Harry Everett Smith, 68, American polymath, cardiac arrest.
- Yō Yoshimura, 37, Japanese voice actor, subarachnoid hemorrhage.

=== 28 ===
- Anton Bilek, 88, Austrian football player and manager.
- Mel Dinelli, 79, American writer for theatre, film and magazines.
- Lu Gwei-djen, 87, Chinese historian and biochemist.
- Jean Palardy, 86, French-Canadian painter, ethnologist and filmmaker.
- Stan Wentzel, 74, American baseball player (Boston Braves).
- Mary Wharton, 79, American botanist, author, and environmental activist.

=== 29 ===
- Ralph Bellamy, 87, American actor (Sunrise at Campobello, The Awful Truth, Trading Places), Tony winner (1958), lung disease.
- Joe Bonson, 55, English footballer.
- Theodor Estermann, 89, German-American mathematician.
- Louis Finkelstein, 96, American talmud scholar.
- Ludovico Geymonat, 83, Italian mathematician, philosopher and historian of science.
- Nasirdin Isanov, 48, Kyrgyz politician, prime minister (since 1991), traffic collision.
- Franjo Majetić, 68, Croatian actor.
- Frank Yerby, 75, American writer, liver cancer.

=== 30 ===
- Clarence W. Allgood, 89, American district judge (United States District Court for the Northern District of Alabama).
- Irena Blühová, 87, Slovak photographer.
- Mikhail Chailakhyan, 89, Armenian-Soviet scientist.
- Hans Lietzau, 78, German theatre director, actor, and producer.
- David Moir Nelson, 71, American football player, coach, and author.
- Josef Pekarek, 78, German footballer.
- Jan Poulus, 75, Dutch footballer.
- Steve Ruzich, 63, American football player (Green Bay Packers).
