= Bünyadlı =

Bünyadlı or Buniatly or Buniyatly or Binyatly or Biniatlou may refer to:

- Bünyadlı, Beylagan, Azerbaijan
- Bünyadlı, Khojavend, Azerbaijan
- Bunyadly, Azerbaijan
