= Aly Mustafayev =

Azerbaijani journalist

Aly Mustafayev Alı Mustafayev Mustafa oğlu
- Born: Alı Mustafayev Mustafa oğlu 14 April 1952; Qazakh, Azerbaijan
- Died: 20 November 1991 (aged 39); Qarakend, Khojavend, Azerbaijan
- Education: Baku State University
- Occupation: Journalist
- Writing career
- Period: 1981–1991
- Notable awards: National Hero of Azerbaijan; 1992

Aly Mustafayev Mustafa oglu (Azerbaijani: Alı Mustafayev Mustafa oğlu) (14 April 1952 – 20 November 1991) was an Azerbaijani journalist and reporter during the Nagorno-Karabakh conflict.

== Early years ==
Mustafayev was born on 14 April 1952 in Qazakhbeyli village of Qazakh raion of Azerbaijan SSR. In 1969, he completed his secondary education at Dash Salakhly village secondary school. From 1971 through 1973, Mustafayev served in the Soviet Armed Forces. In 1976, he entered Baku State University and graduated in 1981 with a degree in journalism. After the graduation, he started working for News program of the Azerbaijani State Television and Radio company. When the Nagorno-Karabakh war started, Mustafayev was assigned to report from the frontlines.

== Death ==
Mustafayev was killed along with 22 passengers and crew members in a helicopter which was shot down by Armenian forces near the Qarakend village of Khojavend district in Nagorno-Karabakh, Azerbaijan. There were no survivors of the crash.

Ali Mustafayev was buried at a Martyrs' Lane cemetery in Baku. He was posthumously awarded the title of the National Hero of Azerbaijan. Mustafayev was also awarded the title of Honored Journalist of the Republic. A school in Baku, capital of Azerbaijan was named after him.

== See also ==
- 1991 Azerbaijani Mil Mi-8 shootdown
- Chingiz Mustafayev
- Osman Mirzayev
- National Hero of Azerbaijan
