= Khojavend =

Khojavend or Xocavənd or Khodjavend may refer to:

- Khojavend District, Azerbaijan
- Khojavend (town), Azerbaijan
- Khojavend (village), Azerbaijan
- Xocavənd, Aghjabadi, Azerbaijan
