= Mahammad Asadov =

Azerbaijani general (1941–1991)

- Məhəmməd Əsədov

Minister of Internal Affairs
- In office 23 May 1990 – 20 November 1991
- President: Ayaz Mutalibov
- Preceded by: Aydin Mammadov
- Succeeded by: Tofig Kerimov

Personal details
- Born: 5 December 1941 Baharlı, Zangilan, Azerbaijan SSR
- Died: 20 November 1991 (aged 49) Karakend, Khojavend, Azerbaijan

Military service
- Branch/service: Internal Troops of Azerbaijan
- Rank: Major General

Mahammad Asadov (Azerbaijani: Məhəmməd Əsədov Nəbi oğlu; 5 December 1941 – 20 November 1991) was the State Advisor to the President of Azerbaijan and Minister of Internal Affairs of the Republic of Azerbaijan.

== Early years ==
Asadov was born on 5 December 1941 in Baharlı village of Zangilan Rayon of Azerbaijan Republic. He completed his secondary education in Mincivan village and entered Baku Statistics College in 1958. Upon completion of the college, Asadov returned to Zangelan Rayon and worked as an inspector until 1961. From 1961 through 1964, he served in the Soviet Army. He then worked in Sumqayit until 1965, when he got enrolled in the Finance Department of Azerbaijan State University. From 1965 until 1968, Asadov worked as Manager Assistant and accountant and in 1968 was appointed head of the Production Department of Sumgayit Party Committee. In 1970, he graduated from Finance Department of Azerbaijan State Economic University. Between 1978 and 1980, Asadov served as the Chairman of Agsu Rayon Executive Committee.

== Political career ==
In 1980, he got enrolled in Moscow Security Forces Academy, graduating cum laude in 1982. He then worked at the Ministry of National Security of Azerbaijan for a short time. Between 1983 and 1986, he was the First Secretary of Regional Party Committee of Beylagan Rayon; between 1986 and 1988 he served in administrative positions and was then the First Secretary of Agdash (1988–89) and Quba raions (1989–90).

On 23 May 1990 Asadov was appointed Minister of Internal Affairs of Azerbaijan SSR. On 5 November he was promoted to General Major and given additional responsibilities of the State Advisor to the President of Azerbaijan.

== Death ==
He was killed in the 20 November 1991 Azerbaijani Mil Mi-8 shootdown by Armenian forces near the Karakend village of Khojavend district in Nagorno-Karabakh, Azerbaijan along with other high-ranking officials from Azerbaijan, Russia and Kazakhstan. There were no survivors of the crash. Asadov was buried at the Honorary Cemetery in Baku.

== See also ==
- 1991 Azerbaijani Mil Mi-8 shootdown
- Internal Troops of Azerbaijan
- Law enforcement in Azerbaijan
