= Quzeyxırman =

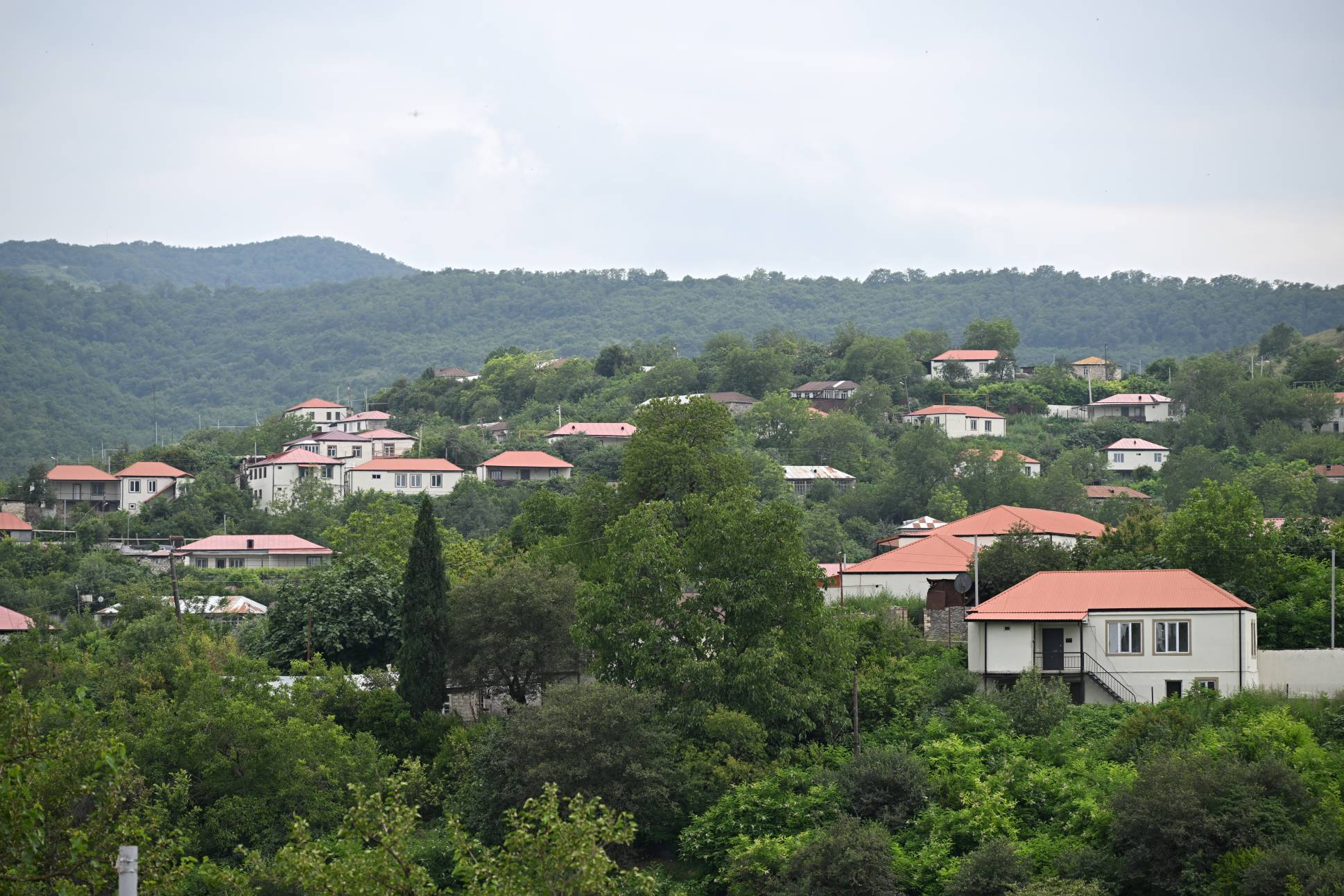

- Location within Azerbaijan Location within Karabakh Economic Region
- Coordinates: 39°44′09″N 47°01′58″E
- Country: Azerbaijan
- District: Khojavend
- Time zone: UTC+4 (AZT)

Quzeyxırman (also, Ghouze-Kaler, Guze-Kaler, Gyuzeykaler, and Quzeyqaler) is a village in the Khojavend District of Azerbaijan.

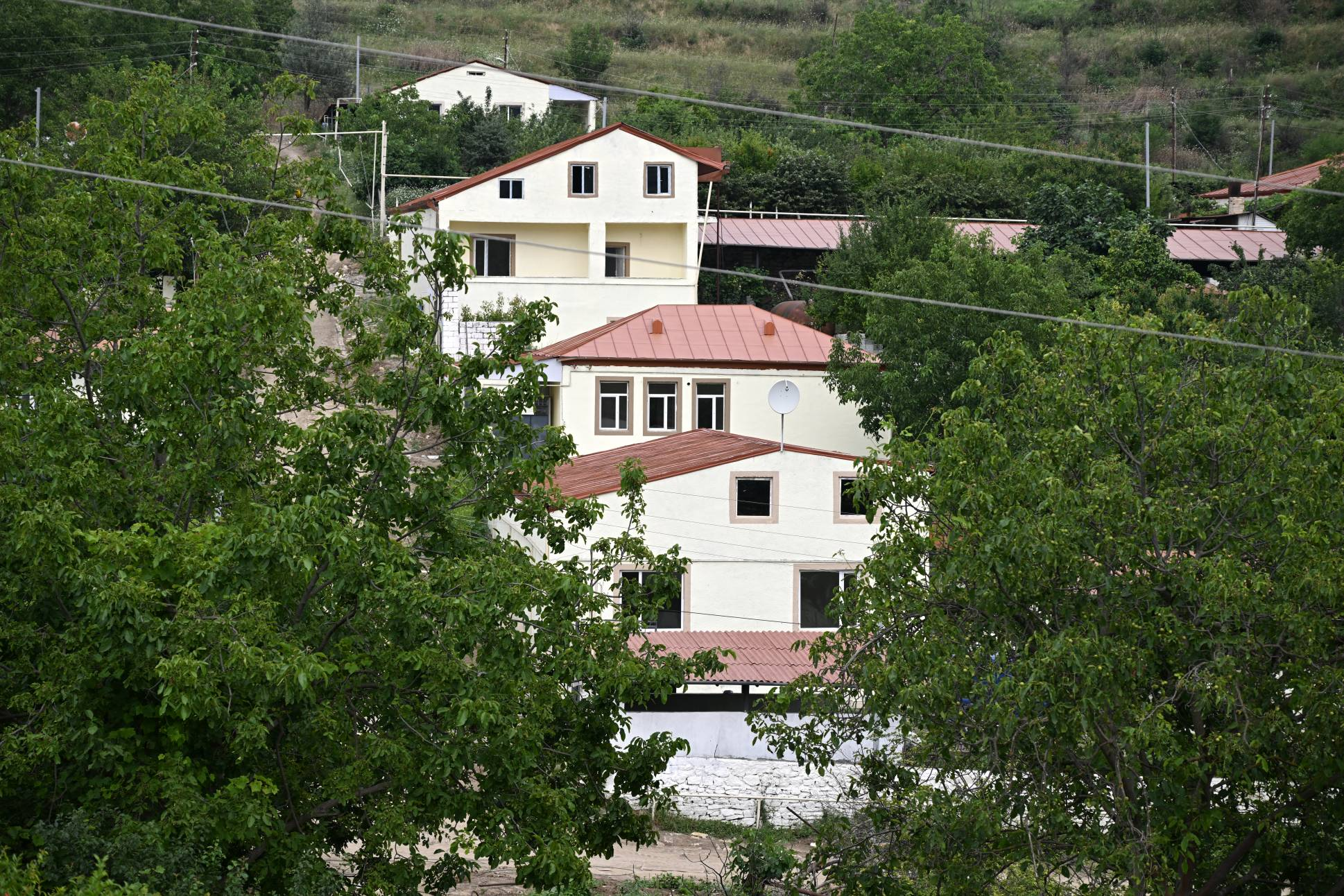
view of Guzeykhirman

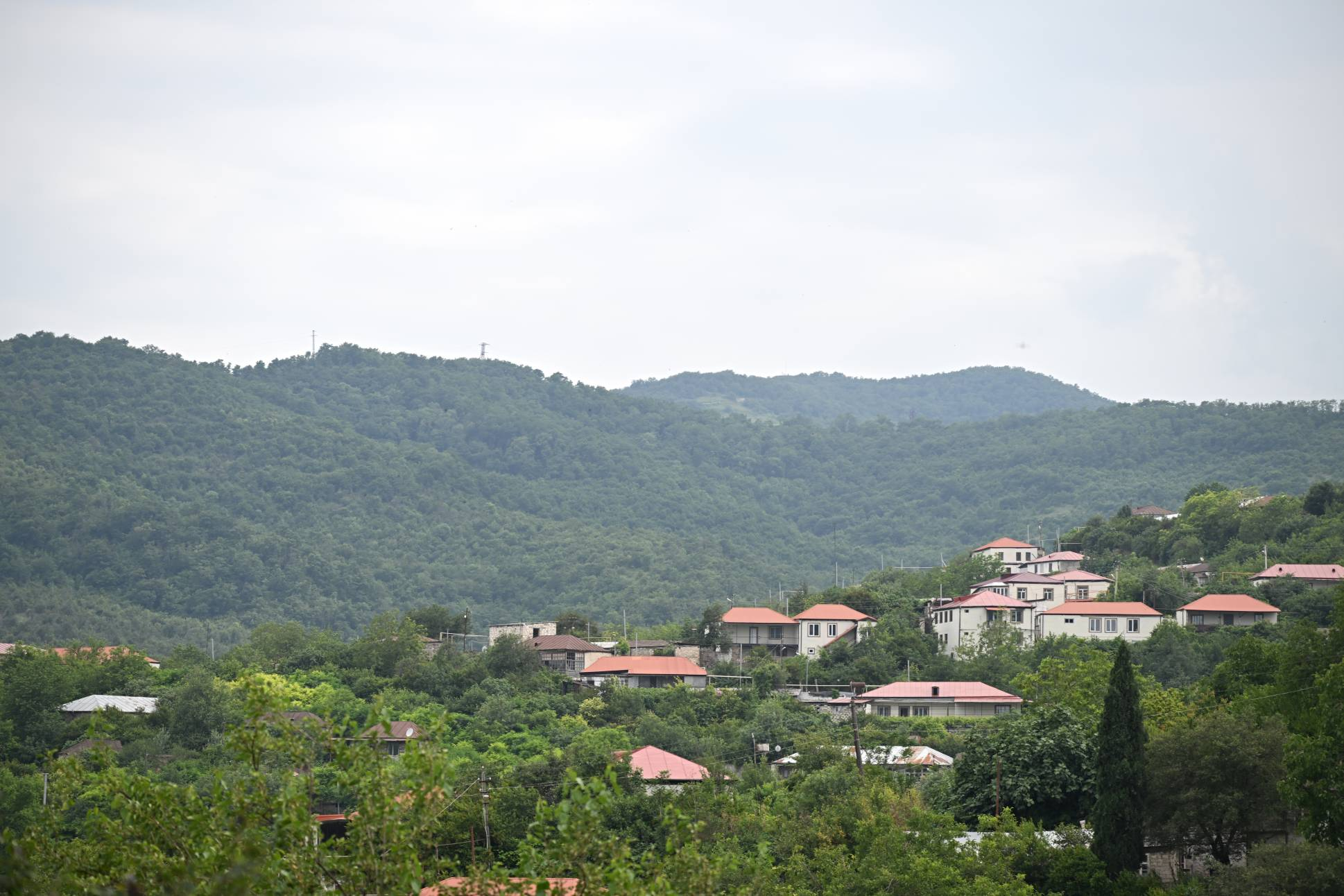
view of Guzeykhirman
