= Güneyxırman =

- Location within Azerbaijan Location within Karabakh Economic Region
- Coordinates: 39°44′52″N 47°02′02″E
- Country: Azerbaijan
- District: Khojavend
- Time zone: UTC+4 (AZT)

Güneyxırman (Guneykhryman, formerly known as Guneykaler) is a village in the Khojavend District of Azerbaijan.
