= Ismat Gayibov Stadium =

Multi-use stadium in Bakikhanov, Baku, Azerbaijan

Coordinates: 40.4369°N 49.9539°E

Bakikhanov Stadium named after Ismat Gayibov
- Interactive map of Bakikhanov Stadium named after Ismat Gayibov
- Location: Bakikhanov, Baku, Azerbaijan
- Capacity: 5,000
- Surface: Grass

Tenant
- Neftchi Baku

Ismat Gayibov Stadium, also referred as Bakikhanov Stadium, is a multi-use stadium in the Bakikhanov settlement of Baku, Azerbaijan. It is named in honor of Ismat Gayibov (1942–1991). It is used mostly for football matches. In February 2011, the president of Neftchi Baku football club Sadyg Sadygov announced that in domestic competitions Neftchi will host the rivals in Ismat Gayibov Stadium beginning in the 2011–2012 season. The stadium is named for Ismat Gayibov, who was the Public Prosecutor General of Azerbaijan when he died in the 1991 Azerbaijani Mil Mi-8 shootdown.

== See also ==
- List of football stadiums in Azerbaijan
