= Tofik Ismailov =

Azerbaijani diplomat (1933–1991)

Secretary of State of Azerbaijan
- In office September 1991 – November 20, 1991
- Preceded by: Office Established
- Succeeded by: Midhat Abasov

Personal details
- Born: June 21, 1933 Baku, Azerbaijan SSR, Soviet Union
- Died: November 20, 1991 (aged 58) Karakend, Khojavend, Azerbaijan
- Spouse: Lala Ismailova
- Relations: Kazim Ismayilov

Tofik Ismailov (Azerbaijani: Tofiq İsmayılov Kazım oğlu; June 21, 1933 – November 20, 1991) was born in Baku, Azerbaijan and served as the first Secretary of State of Azerbaijan.

He was killed in a helicopter which was shot down by Armenian forces near the Karakend village of Khojavend district in Nagorno-Karabakh, Azerbaijan. There were no survivors among the 22 people on board the helicopter.

Ismayilov's official burial was done at the Avenue of the Honored Ones Cemetery in Baku. A stadium in Baku, many schools and streets are named after him.

== See also ==
- 1991 Azerbaijani Mil Mi-8 shootdown
- Tofig Ismayilov Stadium
