= Binə =

Binə may refer to:

- Binə, Baku, Azerbaijan
- Binə, Khojavend, Azerbaijan
