= Zulfi Hajiyev =

Azerbaijani politician

Zulfi Hajiyev Zülfü Hacıyev

Deputy Prime Minister of Azerbaijan
- In office 18 November 1989 – 20 November 1991
- President: Ayaz Mutalibov

Personal details
- Born: March 21, 1935 Böyük Mazra, Armenian SSR, Soviet Union
- Died: November 20, 1991 (aged 56) Karakend, Khojavend, Azerbaijan SSR, USSR

Military service
- Branch/service: Cabinet of Azerbaijan; National Assembly of Azerbaijan

Zulfi Hajiyev Saleh oglu (Azerbaijani: Zülfü Hacıyev Saleh oğlu; March 21, 1935 – 20 November 1991) was a Member of Azerbaijani Parliament and Deputy Prime Minister of Azerbaijan until his death in a helicopter crash on 20 November 1991.

== Early years ==
Hajiyev was born in Böyük Mazra village of Armenia in March 21, 1935. Until 1989, he has worked as the Chairman Executive Committee of Sumgayit, Chairman of Sumgayit Party Committee, Chairman of Cabinet of Ministers of Nakhchivan ASSR. In 1976, he was elected a deputy to the Supreme Soviet of Azerbaijan SSR, to remain a member of parliament until his death. In 1989, Hajiyev was appointed Deputy Prime Minister of Azerbaijan. During his term in office, he was also given responsibilities to preside over matters of Nagorno-Karabakh.

== Death ==
Hajiyev was killed in a helicopter which was accidentally shot down by Armenian forces on 20 November 1991 near the Karakend village of Khojavend district in Nagorno-Karabakh, Azerbaijan along with other high-ranking officials from Azerbaijan, Russia and Kazakhstan. There were no survivors of the crash. Hajiyev was buried at the Honorary Cemetery in Baku.

== Awards ==
For his work and contributions, Hajiyev had been awarded with Order of the Red Banner of Labour, Order of Friendship of Peoples, Order of the Badge of Honour. He was also given a title of Merited Engineer of Republic of Azerbaijan. One of the main streets, a company he had worked for in the past and one of fifteen schools he had built in Sumgayit, and an Azerbaijani oil exploration ship were given his name.

== See also ==
- 1991 Azerbaijani Mil Mi-8 shootdown
- Azerbaijanis in Armenia
