= Domi =

Domi may refer to:

== People ==
- Domi (musician), French keyboardist, collaborator with drummer JD Beck
- Didier Domi (born 1978), French footballer
- Mahir Domi (1915-2000), Albanian linguist
- Tie Domi (born 1969), Canadian retired ice hockey player
- Max Domi (born 1995), Canadian ice hockey player and son of Tie Domi
- Dominique Moceanu (born 1981), American gymnast
- Dominique Thiem (born 1993), Austrian tennis player
- Dominika Cibulková (born 1984), Slovak tennis player
- Domi (footballer) (born 2004), Mario Domínguez Franco, Spanish footballer
- Dom people or Domi, an Indo-Aryan ethnic group

== Other uses ==
- We Are Domi, also known as Domi, a musical group
- Binə, Khojavend, Azerbaijan, a village also known as Domi
- DOM Inspector, software
- Domi plural of domus, the Latin term meaning house or home
