= Lala Shevket =

Azerbaijani politician (born 1951)

- Lalə Şövkət
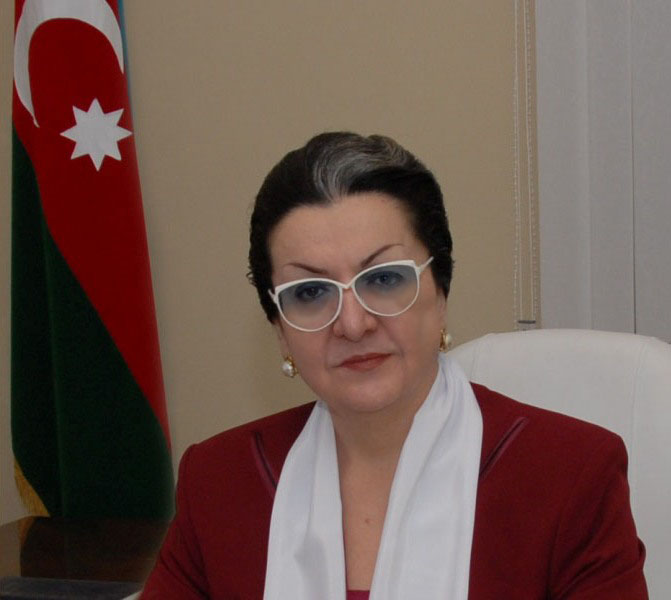
- Shevket in 2006

Secretary of State of Azerbaijan
- In office July 7, 1993 – January 13, 1994
- President: Heydar Aliyev
- Preceded by: Ali Karimli
- Succeeded by: position abolished

Chairman of the Azerbaijan Liberal Party
- In office June 3, 1995 – June 7, 2003
- Preceded by: Party established
- Succeeded by: Avaz Temirkhan

Permanent Representative of Azerbaijan to the United Nations
- In office January 11, 1994 – September 23, 1994
- Preceded by: Yashar Aliyev
- Succeeded by: Eldar Guliyev

Personal details
- Born: November 7, 1951 (age 74) Baku, Azerbaijan SSR, USSR
- Party: Azerbaijan Liberal Party
- Children: 1

Lala Shevket (Azerbaijani: Lalə Şövkət, sometimes transliterated as Lala Şövkat or Lala Shovkat; Лала Шевкет in Russian transliteration); born 7 November 1951, Baku) is an Azerbaijani politician, the leader of the National Unity Movement, and former leader of the Azerbaijan Liberal Party. She served as the Secretary of State between 1993 and 1994.

== Early life and education ==
Shevket was born on 7 November 1951 in Soviet Baku. Shevket's father, Shevket bey Muslim bey oqlu Khalifabeyli-Hajiyev was born 1912 in Quba region of Azerbaijan into a family of noble landowner and philanthropist Muslim bey Khalifabeyli. His mother Tughiya Khanum was the descendant of Shamil, 3rd Imam of Dagestan. In 1968, she graduated from the 189th secondary school of Baku and entered the Azerbaijan Medical University, where she received qualification of a professional physician.

== Scientific career ==
After graduation, Shevket moved to Moscow, where she had her postgraduate and master's course on the surgery chair of Patrice Lumumba Peoples' Friendship University under the guidance of academician, professor Vladimir Vinogradov. At 25, she became the youngest Master of Science in the area of surgery in the USSR. Since 1978, Shevket had been working at the N.V. Sklifosovsky Research Institute for Emergency Medicine, Shevket traveled a long road from a junior research officer to a leading scientific specialist and the head of the department. In 1991, Shevket was officially enlisted by the Russian Prime Minister Ivan Silayev to work out the concepts of social policy of the country.

== Political career ==
=== Independence movement ===
The Black January events of 1990 became a sort of detonator of the flight of Shevket's political career. In 1991, alongside Eduard Shevardnadze, Alexander Yakovlev, Anatoly Sobchak, Gavriil Popov, Algirdas Brazauskas and other democrats, Shevket was one of the founders of the Movement for Democratic Reforms in the USSR.

=== Secretary of State ===
In June 1993, Shevket was invited to Baku by the acting President Heydar Aliyev and on 7 June was appointed the Secretary of State of Azerbaijan Republic. The significance of the position varied in time, and under her, it rose to become the second after the head of state. In an interview to Azerbaijan International, she described the role as follows: "Our Secretary of State is actually more like a Vice-President. But at the same time, the roles and responsibilities of the American Vice-President and the Azerbaijani Vice-President are also totally different. My responsibility covers all aspects of government - from strategy and ideology to the war, defense, and economy. I manage all these."

In January 1994, the last holder of the position, Lala Shevket, wrote a resignation letter as a protest against corruption in the government. After her resignation, the position was formally abolished by presidential decree.

=== Post-government and Liberal Party ===
In January 1993, Shevket was appointed as the Extraordinary and Plenipotentiary Ambassador, making her the first woman ambassador in the history of Azerbaijan. Despite her subsequent appointment as ambassador to the United Nations (UN), she refused to go to New York for 8 months, creating a precedent in world practice, as she could not represent policies that were unacceptable to her.

In 1995, Shevket founded the Liberal Party of Azerbaijan and became its leader after being elected at the Constituent Conference on 3 June 1995. In 1998, Shevket, along with four other potential candidates, boycotted the elections.

On 7 June 2003, during the Liberal Party Congress, Shevket resigned from the party to launch her presidential campaign as an independent candidate, further contributing to the political tradition of Azerbaijan.

As the leader of the National Unity Movement and the Liberal Party of Azerbaijan, Shevket led the 70-candidate list of the Liberal Party in the 2005 Parliamentary Elections. Shevket achieved a decisive victory in her constituency, which was officially recognized by the Central Election Commission. However, due to widespread falsification, the victory of at least 11 Liberal Party candidates was not officially recognized. The Central Election Commission and the courts either ignored their complaints or baselessly rejected them. Additionally, approximately 50 candidates from the Liberal Party's ally, the "Azadliq" Bloc, were also denied their victory. When commencing her campaign, Lala Shevket stated, "I am not fighting for a parliamentary seat, but for my nation."

On 17 February 2006, the "Azadliq" Political Bloc was formed, consisting of three major oppositional political parties: the Azerbaijan Liberal Party, the Popular Front Party, and the Citizens and Development Party. The Bloc has played a significant role in the opposition's struggle for democracy and human rights in Azerbaijan.

In 2008, Shevket, along with other opposition leaders, boycotted the presidential election due to the complete lack of freedom and openness in the country, as well as the absence of even the minimal requirements for a free and fair election.

In 2010, prior to the parliamentary elections, the "Azadliq" Political Bloc was disbanded following the Popular Front Party's decision to form a coalition with the Musavat Party. The Azerbaijan Liberal Party participated in the parliamentary elections alongside its ally, the Citizens and Development Party from the disbanded "Azadliq" Bloc, as well as the Green Party and the Movement of Intelligentsia, forming the Election Bloc "For Human." However, the elections were marred by widespread falsification, preventing any opposition members from entering the Parliament.
