= Temirkhan =

Temirkhan is an Asian name of Turkic origin.

== People with the name ==
- Avaz Temirkhan (born 1959), Azerbaijani politician
- Temirkhan Dosmukhanbetov (1949–2021), Kazakh politician
