= Fakhraddin Shahbazov =

Azerbaijani soldier

- Born: January 22, 1950; Baku, Azerbaijan
- Died: November 20, 1991 (aged 41); Khojavend, Azerbaijan
- Military career
- Allegiance: Republic of Azerbaijan
- Service years: 1991
- Conflicts: First Nagorno-Karabakh War
- Awards: National Hero of Azerbaijan; 1992

Fəxrəddin Şahbazov (Azerbaijani: Fəxrəddin İbrahim oğlu Şahbazov) (22 January 1950, Baku, Azerbaijan – 20 November 1991, Khojavend, Azerbaijan) was an Azerbaijani journalist and a National Hero of Azerbaijan who was killed during the Nagorno-Karabakh conflict.

== Early life and education ==
Shahbazov was born on 22 January 1950 in Baku, Azerbaijan SSR. In 1967, he completed his secondary education at the Secondary School No. 20 in Baku. From 1969 through 1971, Shahbazov served in the Soviet Armed Forces. In 1972, he started to work at the Television and Radio Broadcasting Company of Azerbaijan.

== Nagorno-Karabakh War ==
Fakhraddin Shahbazov volunteered for the front-line for the Nagorno-Karabakh conflict, prepared reports from battlefields and broadcast them in the country and abroad. Shahbazov experienced repeated encounters with dangerous situations while reporting.

On November 20, government officials and a number of other individuals departed for Khojavend on a Mi-8 helicopter. Near the village of Garakend in Khojavend, Armenians attacked the helicopter with heavy machine-gun fire.

== Personal life ==
Shahbazov was married and had two children.

== Memorial and legacy ==
By Decree of the President of Azerbaijan No. 344 dated December 4, 1992, Fakhraddin Shahbazov was posthumously awarded the title of "National Hero of Azerbaijan". He was buried in the Martyrs' Lane in Baku. One of the streets in the Rasulzade settlement is named after him.

== See also ==
- First Nagorno-Karabakh War
- National Hero of Azerbaijan
- 1991 Azerbaijani Mil Mi-8 shootdown
