= Saylau Serikov =

Saylau Serikov Сайлау Сериков

Deputy Ministry of Internal Affairs of Kazakh Soviet Socialist Republic
- In office 1985 – November 20, 1991

Personal details
- Born: December 24, 1940 Kostanay Region, Kazakh SSR
- Died: November 20, 1991 (aged 50) Karakend, Khojavend, Azerbaijan

Military service
- Rank: Colonel

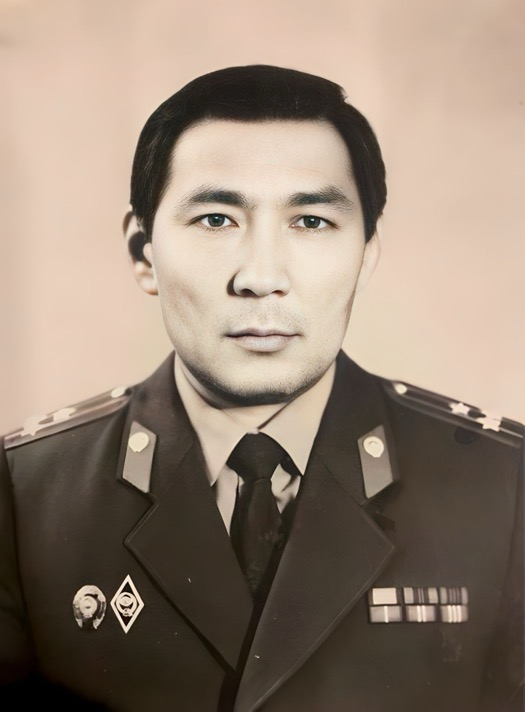
Portrait of Saylau Serikov

Saylau Dosumovich Serikov was the Deputy Minister of Internal Affairs of Kazakh Soviet Socialist Republic. He was killed in the 1991 Azerbaijani Mil Mi-8 shootdown.

== Life ==
Saylau Serikov was born on December 24, 1940, in Karasay village of Kostanay Region, Kazakh SSR.

He started working in the police in 1964 in the Frunze district of Almaty and was promoted to the position of commander of the police division. In 1970, he was promoted to Deputy Chief of the Leninsky District Police Department in Almaty, and in 1974 to the post of Chief.

In 1985, Saylau Serikov was appointed Deputy Minister of Internal Affairs of the Kazakh SSR. He was a police lieutenant colonel at the time.

== Death ==
Serikov was killed in 1991 when the helicopter he was travelling in was shot down near Karakend, Azerbaijan. He and many other government officials also on board were on their way to discuss the conflict with local Armenian representatives. All 22 people on board (19 passengers and three crew) were killed.

He was buried in Almaty. A street in Almaty is named after him.

== Awards ==
In 1977, he was awarded the Order of the Red Banner of Labour.
