= Ağbaşlı =

- Location within Azerbaijan Location within Karabakh Economic Region
- Coordinates: 39°43′23.8″N 47°03′31.4″E
- Country: Azerbaijan
- District: Khojavend
- Time zone: UTC+4 (AZT)
  - Summer (DST): UTC+5 (AZT)

Ağbaşlı (Aghbashly) is a former village in the current Khojavend District of Azerbaijan. Before its abolition, the village was part of the Veysalli Rural administrative division of the Fuzuli District. By the Law of the Republic of Azerbaijan dated December 5, 2023, Aghbashly was abolished, and its territory was transferred to the Khojavend District
