= Bilbilyak =

- Location within Azerbaijan Location within Karabakh Economic Region
- Coordinates: 39°41′40″N 46°56′47″E
- Country: Azerbaijan
- District: Khojavend
- Time zone: UTC+4 (AZT)

Bilbilyak (also, Bilbilak) is a village in the Khojavend District of Azerbaijan.
