= Ismat Gayibov =

Azerbaijani politician (born 1942)

Prosecutor General of the Republic of Azerbaijan

Personal details
- Born: 8 October 1942 Ganja, Azerbaijan
- Died: 20 November 1991 (aged 49) Karakend, Khojavend, Azerbaijan
- Spouse: Leyla Gayibova

Ismat Ismayil oglu Gayibov (Azerbaijani: Ismət Qayıbov Ismail oğlu) (1942–1991) was the Public Prosecutor General of Azerbaijan.

He was killed in a helicopter which was shot down by Armenian forces near the Karakend village of Khojavend district in Nagorno-Karabakh, Azerbaijan. There were no survivors among the 22 people on board the helicopter, which was carrying a peacekeeping mission team, with observers from Russia and Kazakhstan, government officials of Azerbaijan and television journalists.

Gayibov's official burial was done at the Avenue of the Honored Ones Cemetery in Baku. A stadium in Baku, an oil tanker, many schools and streets are named after him.

== See also ==
- 1991 Azerbaijani Mil Mi-8 shootdown
- Ismat Gayibov Stadium
