= Aruş =

- Location within Azerbaijan Location within Karabakh Economic Region
- Coordinates: 39°32′02″N 47°06′14″E
- Country: Azerbaijan
- District: Khojavend
- Time zone: UTC+4 (AZT)

Aruş (Arush) is a village in the Khojavend District of Azerbaijan.
