= Open Talk =

- Genre: Politics
- Presented by: Sevinj Osmanqizi
- Country of origin: Azerbaijan
- Original language: Azeri

Production
- Running time: 60 minutes

Original release
- Network: ANS TV
- Release: 10 September 2011 – present

Open Talk (Azerbaijani: Açıq söhbət) is a weekly topical debate ANS TV television program in Azerbaijan. The show typically features politicians from two political parties as well as other public figures. Open Talk is presented by Sevinj Osmanqizi.

It is usually recorded about 24 hours prior to transmission, but has been broadcast live.

== Origins ==
Open Talk began on 10 September 2011, as a first face-to-face television debate between political parties. It was originally intended to have only a short run, but the program became very popular and was duly extended. Political leaders labeled as “radical opposition” and blacklisted for over a decade, appeared in the debate. Since its launch, Sevinj Osmanqizi has been the program's presenter.
