= Baharlı, Zangilan =

Baharly Azerbaijani: Baharlı
- Location within Azerbaijan
- Coordinates: 39°01′02″N 46°40′38″E
- Country: Azerbaijan
- District: Zangilan
- Time zone: UTC+4 (AZT)
  - Summer (DST): UTC+5 (AZT)

Baharly (Azerbaijani: Baharlı) is a village in the Zangilan District of Azerbaijan.

== History ==
The village was located in the Armenian-occupied territories surrounding Nagorno-Karabakh, coming under the control of ethnic Armenian forces during the First Nagorno-Karabakh War in October 1993.

The village subsequently became part of the self-proclaimed Republic of Artsakh as part of its Kashatagh Province, referred to as Garnavan (Armenian: Գարնավան).

It was recaptured by Azerbaijan on 21 October 2020 during the 2020 Nagorno-Karabakh war.

== Notable natives ==
- Mahammad Asadov — Minister of Internal Affairs of Azerbaijan (1990–1991).
