= Qazaxbəyli =

- Municipality
- Location within Azerbaijan
- Coordinates: 41°09′33″N 45°19′08″E
- Country: Azerbaijan
- Rayon: Qazakh

Population
  - Total: 1,158
- Time zone: UTC+4 (AZT)
  - Summer (DST): UTC+5 (AZT)

Qazaxbəyli (also, Kazakhbeyli) is a village and municipality in the Qazakh Rayon of Azerbaijan. It has a population of 1,158.

== Notable natives ==
- Alı Mustafayev, journalist and reporter, National Hero of Azerbaijan
