= Sevinj Osmanqizi =

Azerbaijani journalist

Sevinc Osmanqızı
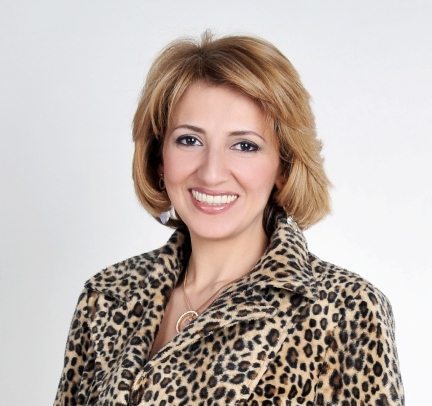
- Born: Sevinj Osman gizi Mirzayeva; 22 June 1969 (age 57); Baku, Azerbaijani SSR
- Education: Baku State University
- Occupations: Journalist, TV Producer, presenter, chief editor
- Known for: Dissident reporting YouTube Channel OSMANQIZI TV
- Notable credit(s): ANS TV; CNN; BBC
- Parent: Osman Mirzayev

Sevinj Osmanqizi (Azerbaijani: Sevinc Osmanqızı; born 22 June 1969) is a journalist, media personality, author and evening TV show host best known for her serious interviews with various political figures. She is one of the most critical and courageous voices of dissent in broadcasting about Azerbaijan. She is known for her forthright interviewing style, particularly when interrogating politicians. She currently produces and hosts a daily news program on YouTube called: OSMANQIZI TV. Osmanqizi was ANS TV network's Chief Editor and News Director, Founding Chairwoman of WMW.

She is the first Azerbaijani woman appointed to a diplomatic post, a CNN World View contributor, and host of the weekly debate programme Open Talk.

== Biography ==
Sevinj Mirzayeva was born in Baku to the journalist Osman Mirzayev and the newspaper editor Solmaz Mirzayeva. After the country regained its independence in 1991, her father rose to the position of Senior Advisor to the President of Azerbaijan Republic. Osmanqizi's father was killed at the age of 53 on the board of an MI-8 military helicopter, carrying an international peacekeeping mission team to Nagorno-Karabakh. Her father's death greatly affected her.

After graduating from university, she worked as TV reporter and became popular for her news reports from the First Nagorno-Karabakh War. In 1990's she was one of the first news presenters introducing independent from government reporting, contributing a newer, outspoken quality to Azerbaijani television. In 1992, Osmanqizi demonstrated her distinctive line of questioning in interview with British Prime Minister Margaret Thatcher. She has regularly made headlines with interviewees such as James Baker, Benazir Bhutto and others.

In 1994, Osmanqizi became the first Azerbaijani woman appointed to a diplomatic post when she was named Deputy Spokeswoman of the Foreign Ministry. However her diplomatic career was brief; Later in 1994 she moved to UK to work for BBC World Service.

Upon return to Azerbaijan, Osmanqizi became Chief Editor of ANS Independent Broadcast Company. From 2008 to 2011 she hosted the weekly programme Friday with Sevinj Osmanqizi and from 2011, the weekly debate show Open Talk.

== Political Debate Moderator ==
In 2011, Osmanqizi introduced political special Open Talk, a televised debate between political leaders and public figures. The debates addressed issues of political dialogue, corruption, fair elections, crackdown on political opponents, prisoners of conscience. It was originally intended to have only a short run, but the program became very popular and was duly extended. Political leaders labeled as “radical opposition” and blacklisted for over a decade, appeared in the debate. Media experts characterized the debates as the rare exception in the Azerbaijani media offering pluralism of views.

== Investigating her father's death ==
She was 22 when her father, Osman Mirzayev, died. He was an important part of the administration – head of the press bureau and unofficial spokesman for then President Ayaz Mutallibov. She was working at the national television news centre as an intern, and heard the news being announced that a helicopter had crashed in Nagorno Karabakh. No alarm bells rang, because she thought her father was in Ganja. Then the announcer read out the names of the casualties, and suddenly she heard her father's name.

The Russian media initially said it was a tragic accident – then later that it had been shot down. The following day, November 21, the chairman of the crash investigation committee announced on TV that the helicopter was shot at by large caliber weapons. Meanwhile, investigators didn't get there till the next day, and were hampered in their inspection of the scene by Russian soldiers. The Russians had recovered the black box from the wreckage and sent it to Russia, but it was soon announced that it had been too badly damaged by fire to provide any information. An official investigation by the Azeri government failed to come to any conclusion, and closed after a few years 'as the area of the crash site was still under occupation'.

Eventually, frustrated with the lack of progress in the official investigation, Osmanqizi undertook her own. She traveled to the crash scene, interviewed dozens of eyewitnesses, tracked down the people in charge at the time, former investigators etc. She put together the hundreds of little pieces of evidence she was able to gather, and in 2011, on the 20th anniversary of the crash, the first part of her documentary "Mission of Peace" came out. It showed that the delegation of peacekeepers from Azerbaijan, Russia and Kazakhstan was killed only two days before the planned signing of a peace agreement. Their deaths were a fatal blow to peace talks and plunged Azerbaijan and Armenia into war over Nagorno Karabakh that took over 20,000 lives.

== Threats, harassment and persecution ==
Threats, intimidation and violence have been used by the Azerbaijani government against Sevinc Osmanqizi to influence her journalism, including death threats and legal persecution. In early January 2015 the government targeted Sevinc Osmanqizi in its latest attempt to stifle press freedom.

While Osmanqizi's inquisitive, balanced, hard-hitting reporting had long garnered criticism from government officials who prefer to feed citizens propaganda, recent unsubstantiated allegations of libel – a criminal offense in Azerbaijan – caught her by surprise. In launching libel charges against Osmanqizi over the holidays, the Azerbaijani government was able to expedite the criminal case before she had the opportunity to challenge the allegations. Rights activists described the case as "trumped up charges after being critical of the government."

With more than 25 years of professional journalism experience, Osmanqizi is familiar with language the Azerbaijani government has used against media figures. She says that, despite her efforts to follow journalistic ethics — accuracy, objectivity, and transparency — she has been labeled a “traitor” and a “spy,” accusations of espionage that she denies and says have led to serious consequences.

The fact that her journalistic talents allowed her to freelance for international news outlets like the BBC and CNN simply fueled government campaigns framing her as a threat to local government. The judge excluded journalists and foreign observers from attending Osmanqizi's trial.

Osmanqizi is no stranger to the dangers of practicing quality journalism in Azerbaijan. She comes from a family of journalists, including her father, Osman Mirzayev, who died on the job. His death ingrained an even deeper passion for truth-seeking and truth-telling in Osmanqizi, who began broadcast reporting at the dissolution of the Soviet Union in 1991 and went on to becoming the chief editor of ANS TV and host of a weekly debate program called Open Talk. She also taught journalism at the US-Azerbaijan Journalism Academy.

Since fleeing Azerbaijan for the U.S., she has been active on her online news channel on YouTube. Her online news program OSMANQIZI TV has more than 400,000 subscribers on YouTube

== Quotes ==
In Soviet times, I remember when we had censorship, censored material would be stripped from newspapers, leaving blank pages in its place. Today there are more blank pages because people censor themselves. There’s fear in our journalists.—Sevinc Osmanqizi

== Documentaries ==
- "Black January, Red Carnations" (ANS TV, 2012)
- "Mission of Peace" ( ANS TV, 2011)
- "Mission of Peace-2" (ANS TV, 2012)
- "Civilizations" (BBC World Service, 1999)
