= Azerbaijan Liberal Party =

Azerbaijan Liberal Party Azərbaycan Liberal Partiyası
- Leader: Lala Shevket
- Chairman: Avaz Temirkhan
- Founded: 1995
- Dissolved: 2023
- Ideology: Liberalism; Liberal democracy Neoliberalism
- Political position: Centre-right
- European affiliation: European Liberal Democrat and Reform Party
- International affiliation: Liberal International
- Colors: Dark red and white

Party flag

The Azerbaijan Liberal Party (Azerbaijani: Azərbaycan Liberal Partiyası) was a liberal political party in Azerbaijan.

It was founded on 3 June 1995 by the former Secretary of State of Azerbaijan Lala Shevket on the Constituent Conference held in the town of Barda. It was registered with the Azerbaijani Ministry of Justice on 15 August 1995.

ALP declared its main purpose to be the construction of a legal state with socially orientated liberal economy, parliamentary democracy and with the clear division of powers between the branches of government, guaranteeing equality of everyone before the law.

The supreme governing body of ALP was its Congress. The main everyday working organs were the Political Council, Executive Committee, and the Central Revision Committee.

The founder (and leader) of the Liberal Party of Azerbaijan was the doctor of medicine and philosophy, professor Lala Shevket. Shevket had been elected to the position of party chairman at the party's Constituent Conference on 3 June 1995. In June 2003, she resigned from her position prior to the Presidential elections, though the members of the Liberal Party still consider her their spiritual and moral leader, the position being confirmed by the ALP III Congress on 7 June 2003.

At the 2000/2001 election (November 5, 2000 and January 7, 2001), the party won 1.3% of the popular vote and zero out of 125 seats, according to the official results of the Central Election Commission.

On November 27, 2023, the last chairman of the party, Avaz Temirkhan, announced that the party's activities had been suspended. Although he did not disclose the reason for the party's suspension, he announced that the party's main goal from now on would be to participate in the parliamentary elections if proportional elections were restored.

== See also ==
- Liberalism
- Contributions to liberal theory
- Liberalism worldwide
- List of liberal parties
- Liberal democracy
