= Khojavend (village) =

Xocavənd
- village
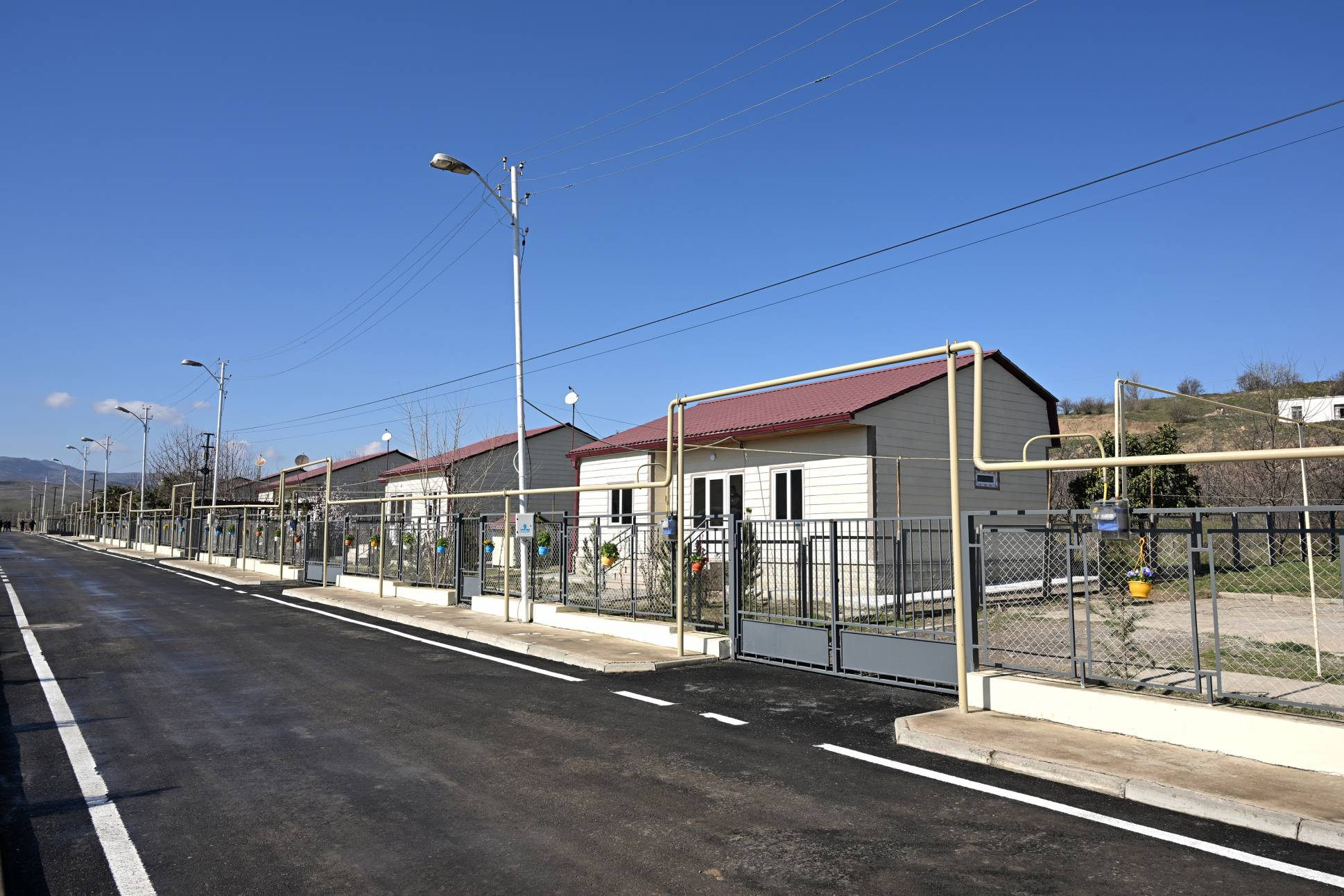

- Location within Azerbaijan Location within Karabakh Economic Region
- Coordinates: 39°47′16″N 47°05′53″E
- Country: Azerbaijan
- Rayon: Khojavend

Population 2026
  - Total: 94
- Time zone: UTC+4 (AZT)
  - Summer (DST): UTC+5 (AZT)

Khojavend (Azerbaijani: Xocavənd) is a village in the Khojavend District of Azerbaijan, in the region of Nagorno-Karabakh. It is located close to the similarly named Khojavend city. Until 2023 it was controlled by the breakaway Republic of Artsakh, as part of its Martuni Province, after the First Nagorno-Karabakh War.

Following the 2023 Azerbaijani offensive in Nagorno-Karabakh, the village was resettled in February 2026 by 20 Azerbaijani families (totaling 94 people).
