= Avaz Temirkhan =

Azerbaijani politician

Chairman of the Azerbaijan Liberal Party
- Incumbent
- Assumed office 12 September 2010

Personal details
- Born: 1 April 1959 (age 67) Soğanverdilər, Barda District, Azerbaijan Soviet Socialist Republic
- Party: Azerbaijan Liberal Party

Avaz Temirkhan (born 1 April 1959) is an Azerbaijani politician who has served as the chairman of the Azerbaijan Liberal Party.
