= Osman Mirzayev =

- Born: April 13, 1937 Baku, Azerbaijan
- Died: November 20, 1991 (aged 54) Xocavand, Azerbaijan
- Occupation: Journalist, writer, publicist, television presenter, president's spokesperson
- Children: Sevinj Osmanqizi

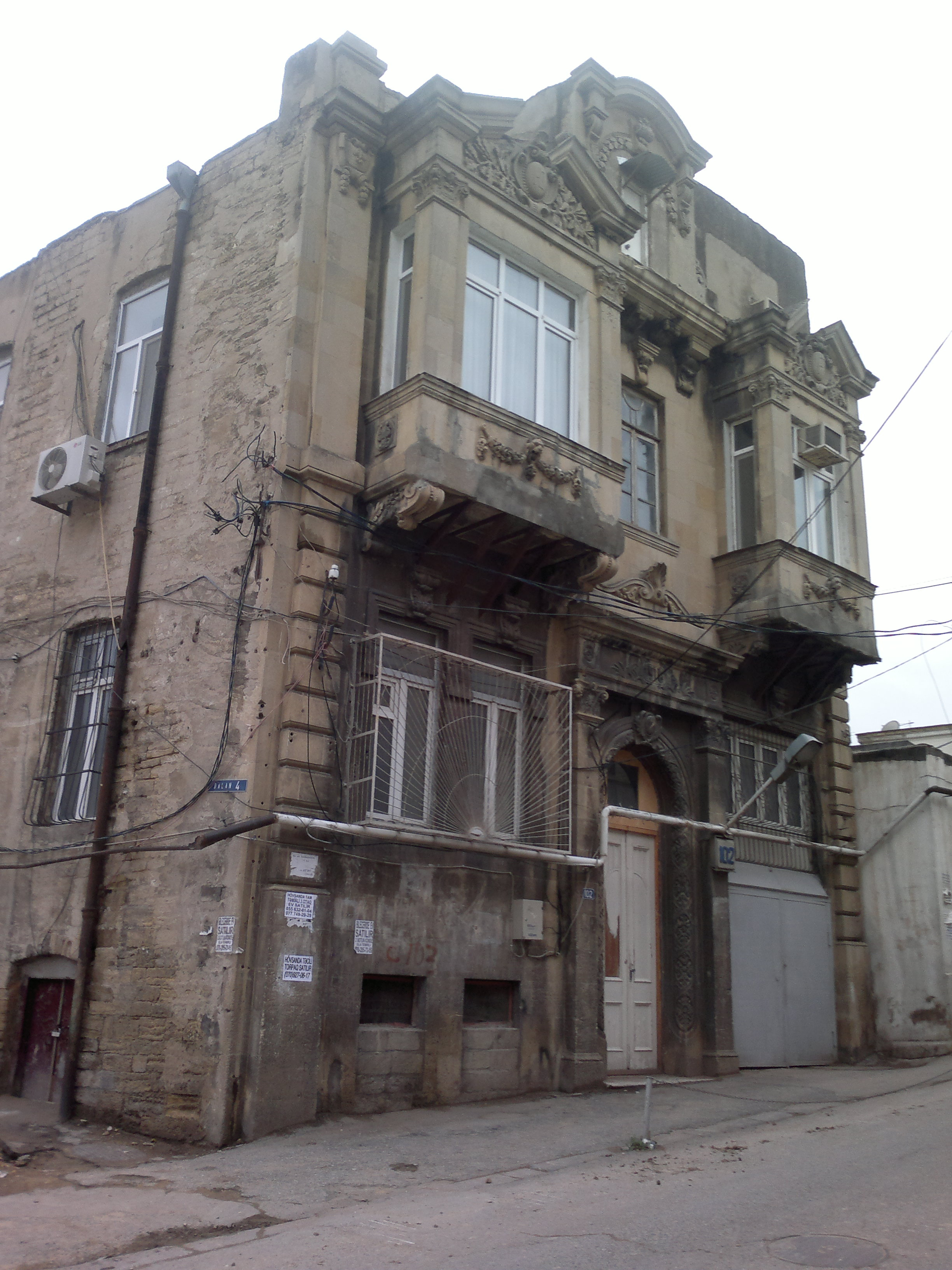
House in Baku, where Osman Mirzayev lived

Osman Mirzayev (Azerbaijani: Osman Mirzayev Mirzabeyoğlu; April 13, 1937 – November 20, 1991) was an Azerbaijani journalist, writer and publicist in Soviet Azerbaijan, then part of the USSR. He was the father of journalist Sevinj Osmanqizi.

Osman Mirzayev is widely regarded as one of the pioneers of independent journalism in Azerbaijan. He came to prominence as a presenter of Dalga (Wave), Azerbaijan's first political TV programme, and through his investigative articles about political repression and persecution in the Soviet Azerbaijan and books We Only Live Once, Eagle in Flight, Drop and Lake and many other writings. Mirzayev's book Adlarimiz (Our Names) reviews the origins and meanings of the most popular first names in Azerbaijan.

== Biography ==
Osman Mirzayev was born on April 13, 1937, in Baku, Azerbaijan. He was the graduate of the Philology Department of Azerbaijan State University.

After the country regained its independence in 1991, he rose to the position of Presidential Spokesman and Head of the Information Department of the Presidential Administration of the Azerbaijan Republic.

== Death ==
Osman Mirzayev was assassinated on November 20, 1991 Azerbaijani Mil Mi-8 shootdown in Nagorno Karabakh. He was part of a 22–person international mission to investigate clashes in the region. There were no survivors of the crash. He left a wife and three daughters, all engaged in journalism. Osman Mirzayev is buried at the Alley of Honor in Baku. There are streets and schools named after Osman Mirzayev in Azerbaijan.

== Selected awards and honours ==
- 1993: National Hero of Azerbaijan (awarded post mortem)
- 1994: Honorary doctoral degree of the Azerbaijan State University
- 1985: The Golden Pen Award
- 1988: Honorary Journalist of Azerbaijan Republic

== Authored Books ==
- "Eagle in Flight": (1978)
- "Drop and Lake" (1979)
- "Our Names"(1986). Etymology and meaning of popular Azeri names. Reprinted in 1994, and 2010.
- "We Only Live Once" (1991)

== See also ==
- 1991 Azerbaijani Mil Mi-8 shootdown
