= Maurice Mercery =

French footballer (1902–1991)

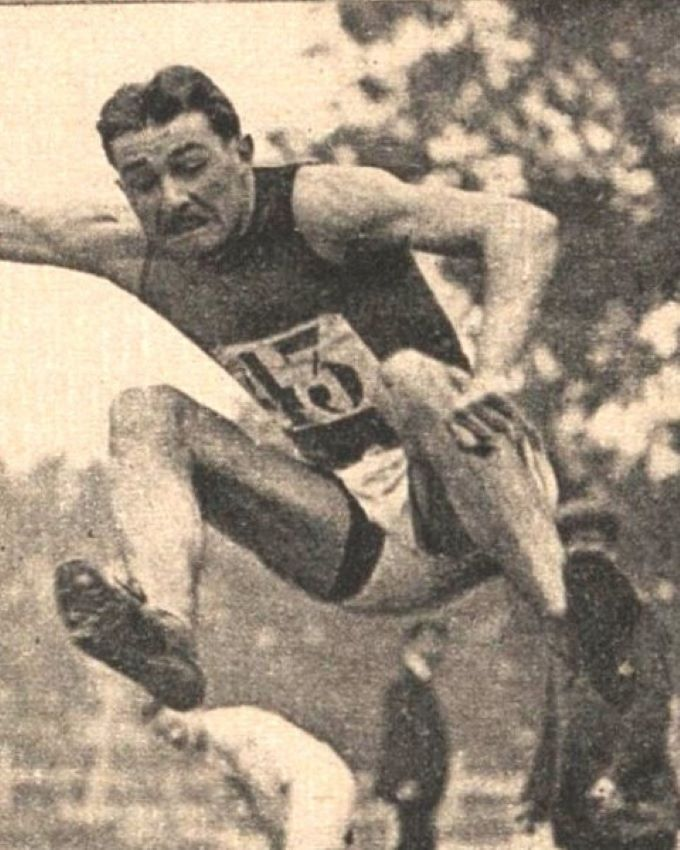
- Mercery in 1920

Personal information
- Full name: Maurice Mercery
- Date of birth: 20 April 1902
- Place of birth: 10th arrondissement of Paris, France
- Date of death: 13 November 1991 (aged 89)
- Place of death: Pessac, France
- Position: Midfielder

Senior career*
Years	Team	Apps	(Gls)
1919–1921	AS Française		

International career
1920	France	1	(0)
- * Club domestic league appearances and goals

Maurice Mercery (20 April 1902 – 13 November 1991) was a French footballer who played as a midfielder for AS Française and the France national team in the early 1920s.

== Career ==
Born in the 10th arrondissement of Paris on 20 April 1902, (Note: Some sources wrongly state that he was born in 1900.) Mercery began playing football in his hometown club AS Française in 1919, aged 17.

On 5 April 1920, he earned his first (and only) international cap for France in a friendly against England Amateurs in Rouen, which ended in a 0–5 loss. The following day, the journalists of French newspaper L'Auto (the future L'Équipe) described his performance as "a courageous debut", and added that "he lacked tactics and weakened the line, but is a player to watch". At the time of his debut, Mercery was two weeks shy from his 18th birthday, thus being among the youngest footballers to have played for the French national team.

A few months later, Mercery was one of the French athletes who participated in the 1920 Olympic Games in Antwerp, being a member of the second French team that competed in the Men's 4 × 400 metres relay.

After retiring from football, Mercery became a hotelier in Valmondois.

== Death ==
Meyer died in Pessac on 13 November 1991, at the age of 89.
