= Stanley Rimington =

Australian cricketer

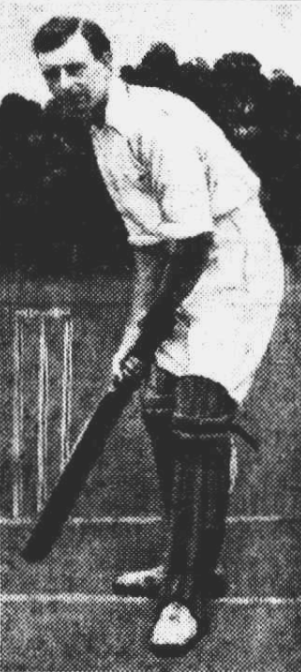

Personal information
- Full name: Stanley Garnet Rimington
- Born: 22 January 1892; Melbourne, Australia
- Died: 23 November 1991 (aged 99); Melbourne, Australia
- Batting: Right-handed
- Bowling: Legbreak googly
- Role: All-rounder

Domestic team information
- Years: Team
- 1922: Victoria
- Source: Cricinfo, 20 November 2015

Stanley Rimington (22 January 1892 – 23 November 1991) was an Australian cricketer notable for playing one first-class cricket match for Victoria in 1922. He was an all-rounder for Hawthorn-East Melbourne in Victorian district cricket from the 1921/22 to the 1926/27 seasons and became a life member of the club.

== Cricket career ==
Rimington began his cricket career early in life by playing for the Kew Baptist team in mat cricket where he was a successful batsman topping the club average in four seasons which resulted in him being selected in a Victorian junior side which played in Adelaide in the 1913/14 season. He was invited to join the Hawthorn Cricket Club for the 1914/15 sub-district season. He was later selected for a sub-district colts team which played against a Rest of Victoria XI and he top scored with 48.

In 1916 he was invited to join the East Melbourne cricket club which would have allowed him to play in the Victorian senior district cricket competition however he declined as he felt his job would not allow him enough time to practice. Despite lacking a large amount of practice time he developed a leg-break, wrong un, and quicker ball resulting in him becoming the most effective bowler in the sub-district competition. He also became a notable slips fielder and was able to keep wicket.

In 1922 Hawthorn and East Melbourne merged to become one senior district side and Rimington began to devote more time to practice in order to serve the club. He was also selected to travel to Tasmania with the Victorian side in February, 1922, and played in the first-class match scoring 91 in Victoria's only innings. He played for the Hawthorn-East First XI in district cricket up until the 1926/27 season.

== See also ==
- List of Victoria first-class cricketers
