= Alan McLaughlin =

Australian rules footballer

Personal information
- Full name: Alan John McLaughlin
- Born: 1 April 1920; Prahran, Victoria
- Died: 19 November 1991 (aged 71)
- Original team: Fitzroy Districts
- Height: 173 cm (5 ft 8 in)
- Weight: 73 kg (161 lb)
- Position: Wing

Playing career^{1}
Years	Club	Games (Goals)
1946–1950	Fitzroy	76 (6)
- ^{1} Playing statistics correct to the end of 1950.

Alan John McLaughlin (1 April 1920 – 19 November 1991) was an Australian rules footballer who played for the Fitzroy Football Club in the Victorian Football League (VFL).
