= Soğanverdilər =

- Municipality
- Location within Azerbaijan Location within Karabakh Economic Region
- Coordinates: 40°14′31″N 47°07′36″E
- Country: Azerbaijan
- Rayon: Barda

Population
  - Total: 1,487
- Time zone: UTC+4 (AZT)
  - Summer (DST): UTC+5 (AZT)

Soğanverdilər (also, Soganverdilar and Subkhanverdilar) is a village and municipality in the Barda Rayon of Azerbaijan. It has a population of 1,487.
