= Bünyadlı, Beylagan =

Bünyadlı
- Municipality
- Location within Azerbaijan
- Coordinates: 39°45′45″N 47°49′29″E
- Country: Azerbaijan
- Rayon: Beylagan

Population
  - Total: 2,270
- Time zone: UTC+4 (AZT)
  - Summer (DST): UTC+5 (AZT)

Bünyadlı (also, Buniatly, Buniyatly, and Bunyadly) is a village and municipality in the Beylagan Rayon of Azerbaijan. It has a population of 2,270.
