= Jack Vinall (Australian footballer) =

Australian rules footballer

Personal information
- Full name: Jack Vinall
- Born: 26 December 1920
- Died: 17 November 1991 (aged 70)
- Original team: Williamstown Juniors
- Height: 180 cm (5 ft 11 in)
- Weight: 81 kg (179 lb)

Playing career^{1}
Years	Club	Games (Goals)
1944	Essendon	2 (1)
- ^{1} Playing statistics correct to the end of 1944.

Jack Vinall (26 December 1920 – 17 November 1991) was an Australian rules footballer who played with Essendon in the Victorian Football League (VFL).

He originally came from Trafalgar in Gippsland to Queenscliff then to Williamstown District and Williamstown Juniors before playing with Essendon in 1944. Vinall then transferred to Williamstown in the VFA in 1945 and played 11 senior games up until the end of 1946. He then became captain-coach of the Seconds at Williamstown in 1947, coaching them to the premiership in 1948 and then retiring but continuing to coach the Seconds in 1949. He later coached the Thirds at Williamstown in 1953 and was President of the Thirds in 1965.
