= Leo Carbol =

Canadian ice hockey player

- Born: June 5, 1908; Ottawa, Ontario, Canada
- Died: November 13, 1991 (aged 83); Missouri, United States
- Height: 5 ft 11 in (180 cm)
- Weight: 170 lb (77 kg; 12 st 2 lb)
- Position: Defence
- Shot: Right
- Played for: Chicago Black Hawks
- Playing career: 1929–1946

Leonid Joseph Carbol (June 5, 1908 — November 13, 1991) was a Canadian ice hockey defenceman. He played six games for the Chicago Black Hawks of the National Hockey League during the 1942–43 season. The rest of his career, which lasted from 1929 to 1946, was mainly spent with the St. Louis Flyers of the American Hockey Association

== Career statistics ==
=== Regular season and playoffs ===
			Regular season					Playoffs
Season	Team	League	GP	G	A	Pts	PIM	GP	G	A	Pts	PIM
1929–30	Canmore Canadians	ASHL	—	—	—	—	—	—	—	—	—	—
1929–30	Seattle Eskimos	PCHL	1	0	0	0	0	—	—	—	—	—
1930–31	Minneapolis Millers	AHA	44	5	5	10	110	—	—	—	—	—
1931–32	Buffalo Majors	AHA	19	2	0	2	30	—	—	—	—	—
1931–32	St. Louis Flyers	AHA	7	0	1	1	4	—	—	—	—	—
1931–32	Chicago Shamrocks	AHA	—	—	—	—	—	—	—	—	—	—
1932–33	Detroit Olympics	IHL	23	0	3	3	46	—	—	—	—	—
1932–33	St. Louis Flyers	AHA	19	2	2	4	40	4	0	0	0	8
1933–34	St. Louis Flyers	AHA	48	3	2	5	65	7	0	0	0	10
1934–35	St. Louis Flyers	AHA	48	6	7	13	69	6	0	1	1	32
1935–36	St. Louis Flyers	AHA	46	2	5	7	63	8	1	0	1	8
1936–37	St. Louis Flyers	AHA	47	2	7	9	82	6	0	1	1	16
1937–38	St. Louis Flyers	AHA	48	6	15	21	62	7	0	1	1	10
1938–39	St. Louis Flyers	AHA	48	3	15	18	67	7	1	2	3	10
1939–40	St. Louis Flyers	AHA	48	6	17	23	53	5	1	1	2	2
1940–41	St. Louis Flyers	AHA	43	3	19	22	58	9	1	6	7	6
1941–42	St. Louis Flyers	AHA	48	5	11	16	69	2	0	0	0	10
1942–43	Chicago Black Hawks	NHL	6	0	1	1	4	—	—	—	—	—
1945–46	St. Louis Flyers	AHL	1	0	0	0	0	—	—	—	—	—
AHA totals			513	45	106	151	772	61	4	12	16	112
NHL totals			6	0	1	1	4	—	—	—	—	—
