= 1991 Azerbaijani Mil Mi-8 shootdown =

Aviation accident

Coordinates: 40°23′N 49°50′E

1991 Azerbaijani MI-8 helicopter shootdown
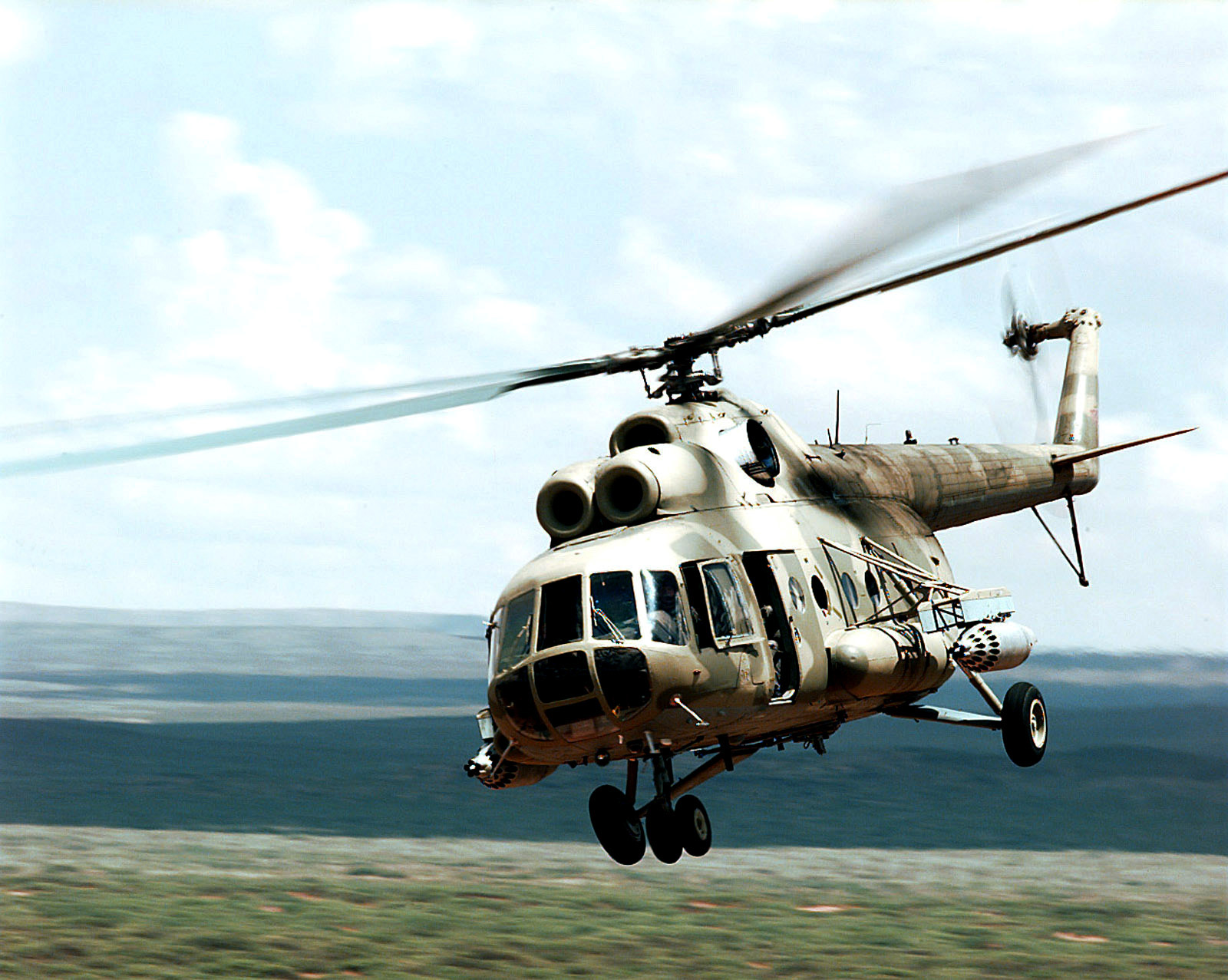
- A Mil Mi-8 similar to the aircraft shot down

Shootdown
- Date: November 20, 1991
- Summary: Shootdown
- Site: Berdashen (Karakend), Azerbaijan (then under the control of the Nagorno-Karabakh Republic)

Aircraft
- Aircraft type: Mil Mi-8
- Registration: 72
- Flight origin: Aghdam
- Destination: Martuni
- Fatalities: 22
- Survivors: 0

On November 20, 1991, an Azerbaijani Mil Mi-8 military helicopter, carrying a peacekeeping mission team consisting of 13 Azerbaijani government officials, two Russian and one Kazakhstani Ministry of Internal Affairs officials, three Azerbaijani journalists and three helicopter crew was shot down amidst heavy fighting near the village of Berdashen, also known as Karakend, in Nagorno-Karabakh. All 22 people (19 passengers and three crew) on board were killed in the crash. The incident is known in Azerbaijan as the ''Karakend tragedy''.

== Background ==
In accordance with the Zheleznovodsk communique initiated by Boris Yeltsin and Nursultan Nazarbayev in the Russian city of Zheleznovodsk for the peaceful resolution of the Nagorno-Karabakh conflict and their subsequent shuttle diplomacy visit to the region in September 1991, officials from Russia and Kazakhstan were placed in the Nagorno-Karabakh Autonomous Oblast (NKAO) for an observation mission.

On the eve of the crash, the Armenian side ceased the peace talks with Azerbaijan until Azerbaijan re-opened the natural gas supply to Armenia, which it had cut off on November 4. The team of observers along with representatives of Azerbaijani government were to fly from Aghdam to Martuni due to rising tension in the district.

== Shootdown ==
The helicopter departed from Aghdam on 20 November 1991 with 22 people on board and was shot down en route with a group of ZSU-23-4 Shilka and SA-6 missiles, killing everyone on board. The attack on the helicopter disrupted the ongoing peace talks.

Various conspiracy theories about the incident have since been in circulation, and are promoted by various political figures in Azerbaijan, who claim that the shootdown was a political assassination. Despite an absence of official investigation evidence, such theories are considered credible by a significant part of the Azerbaijani population.

List of victims

| Full name | Position | Country |
|---|---|---|
| Tofig Ismayilov | Secretary of State | Azerbaijan |
| Ismat Gayibov | Public Prosecutor General | Azerbaijan |
| Mahammad Asadov | Minister of Internal Affairs, State Advisor | Azerbaijan |
| Zulfi Hajiyev | Deputy Prime Minister | Azerbaijan |
| Osman Mirzayev | Press Secretary of the President of Azerbaijan, journalist | Azerbaijan |
| Ali Mustafayev | Journalist of Azerbaijani State TV, Azerbaijan | Azerbaijan |
| Vagif Jafarov | Member of Parliament | Azerbaijan |
| Vali Mammadov | Member of Parliament | Azerbaijan |
| Igor Plavski | Public Prosecutor of Nagorno-Karabakh Autonomous Oblast (NKAO) | Azerbaijan |
| Saylau Serikov | Deputy Minister of Internal Affairs | Kazakhstan |
| Fakhraddin Shahbazov | Cameraman, Azerbaijani State TV | Azerbaijan |
| Arif Huseynzadeh | Lights technician, Azerbaijani State TV | Azerbaijan |
| Rafig Mammadov | Aide to Secretary of State | Azerbaijan |
| Sergey Ivanov | Head of department of National Security Ministry, NKAO | Azerbaijan |
| Nikolai Zhinkin | Commandant for Emergency Situations of NKAO | Azerbaijan |
| Mikhail Lukashov | Major General, MVD | Russia |
| Oleg Kocherev | Lieutenant Colonel, MVD | Russia |
| Vladimir Kovalyov | Head of Ministry of Internal Affairs of NKAO | Azerbaijan |
| Gurban Namazaliyev | Deputy Prime Minister of Amelioration and Water Management | Azerbaijan |
| Vyacheslav Kotov | Commander of helicopter crew | Azerbaijan |
| Gennadiy Domov | Member of the helicopter crew | Azerbaijan |
| Dmitry Yarovenko | Member of the helicopter crew | Azerbaijan |

== Investigation ==
Initial reports by central state agency TASS claimed the helicopter flew into fog and crashed into a hill. On November 21, the chairman of the crash investigation committee announced over TV that the helicopter was shot at by large caliber weapons and the weapons and video equipment were stolen from the site of the incident. At 6:30 PM, the same day, the deputy Chief of Command of Internal Troops of the Ministry for Internal Affairs of USSR, Vyacheslav Ponomarev left for Aghdam. The Interior Ministry officials declared they would not withdraw the internal troop detachments from the district due to escalation of the conflict. The investigation committee was also to determine where the victims would be buried. However, because the area of the crash was soon captured by Armenian militants, the investigation was suspended and no one was indicted.

The investigation was initiated for clarifying the reasons for the crash. The first version was transferred by TASS referring to the commander's special area of NKAO: helicopter exploded, sprung upon a rock in the fog. However, an investigation found holes in the fuselage consistent with the explosion of a rocket. Investigation Commission Chairman Adil Agayev said that the helicopter was shot down from the ground by a large-caliber weapon, video equipment and weapons from the crash site were removed. Armenians denied any involvement, although they were blamed immediately for the incident. In response to Agayev the deputies of the USSR from Armenia and Nagorno-Karabakh Zori Balayan, Victor Hambardzumyan, Henrik Igityan, Sos Sargsyan accused Central television of bias and hinted at the uninvolvement of Armenians in the crash. According to American researcher Michael P. Croissant, it appeared to be an Armenian rocket attack.

== Aftermath ==
After the public burial of the Azerbaijani victims in Baku on November 22, demonstrations began. The protestors demanded the Supreme Soviet and the chairman of Communist Party of Azerbaijan, Ayaz Mutalibov, to establish authority in Karabakh or resign from office.

As a result, the Azerbaijani Supreme Soviet called a special session on November 26 requesting the imposition of martial law in the republic, withdrawing cadets and officers of Azerbaijani ethnicity from the Soviet Army and ceasing all negotiations with Armenia.

On November 27, the Azerbaijani Supreme Soviet voted in favour of abolishing the autonomous status of NKAO and established direct rule over it. It also officially changed the name of Stepanakert to its pre-Soviet name, Khankendi, and re-arranged administrative division of the rayons in Nagorno-Karabakh area.

== See also ==
- List of aircraft shootdowns during the Nagorno-Karabakh Conflict
