= Max Smethurst =

Australian rules footballer, born 1914

Personal information
- Full name: Maxwell Holmes Smethurst
- Born: 6 December 1914; Emerald, Victoria
- Died: 22 November 1991 (aged 76); Gold Coast, Queensland
- Original team: Pakenham
- Height: 182 cm (6 ft 0 in)
- Weight: 83 kg (183 lb)

Playing career^{1}
Years	Club	Games (Goals)
1935	Hawthorn	3 (0)
- ^{1} Playing statistics correct to the end of 1935.

Maxwell Holmes Smethurst (6 December 1914 – 22 November 1991) was an Australian rules footballer who played with Hawthorn in the Victorian Football League (VFL).
