= Russell McInnes =

Australian rules footballer, born 1912

Personal information
- Full name: Russell McInnes
- Born: 10 December 1912
- Died: 5 November 1991 (aged 78)
- Original team: Macarthur
- Height: 182 cm (6 ft 0 in)
- Weight: 80 kg (176 lb)

Playing career^{1}
Years	Club	Games (Goals)
1936–37	Fitzroy	13 (0)
1937	South Melbourne	3 (0)
Total		16 (0)
- ^{1} Playing statistics correct to the end of 1937.

Russell McInnes (10 December 1912 – 5 November 1991) was an Australian rules footballer who played with Fitzroy and South Melbourne in the Victorian Football League (VFL).
