= Bunyadly =

- Location within Azerbaijan
- Coordinates: 39°49′42″N 48°49′35″E
- Country: Azerbaijan
- Rayon: Sabirabad
- Time zone: UTC+4 (AZT)
  - Summer (DST): UTC+5 (AZT)

Bunyadly (also, Bunatly) is a village in the Sabirabad Rayon of Azerbaijan.
