= Vagif Jafarov =

Azeri politician

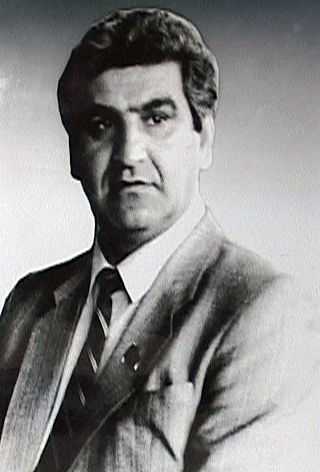
Vagif Jafarov

Vagif Jafarov (Azerbaijani: Vaqif Cafərov, 18 April 1949 – 20 November 1991) was an Azerbaijani Member of Parliament. He was one of the 22 people killed in the 1991 Azerbaijani Mil Mi-8 shootdown.

== Biography ==
Jafarov was born in the city of Shusha. In 1966, he graduated from Shusha secondary school No. 1, and in 1972 from the energy faculty of the Azerbaijan Institute of Petroleum and Chemistry.

In 1966, he graduated from Shusha secondary school No. 1, and in 1972 from the energy faculty of the Azerbaijan Institute of Petroleum and Chemistry named after the geologist M. Azizbayov.

After being discharged from the army in 1973, he returned to Shusha and worked as a department head in the editorial office of "Shusha" newspaper, instructor in the organizational department of the Komsomol Committee of Nagorno-Karabakh, in 1974–1976 as the second secretary of the Komsomol committee of Agdara region.

Until 1980, he was an instructor at the Shusha District Committee of the Communist Party of Azerbaijan, and at the same time served as chairman of the party commission on a voluntary basis.

In 1980–1982 he was a student of the Baku Higher Party School.

Until 1988, he worked as a lecturer, instructor, deputy head of department, head of administrative bodies and financial and trade department of the Nagorno-Karabakh Regional Committee of the Communist Party of Azerbaijan.

From August 1988 to October 1991, Vagif Jafarov worked as the First Secretary of the Shusha District Party Committee.

In October 1991, he was appointed Deputy Minister of Construction and Industry of the Republic of Azerbaijan. Vagif Jafarov did a lot as a deputy of the Supreme Soviet of the USSR. One of his greatest services was that he took the initiative to give Shusha the status of a city and soon achieved this goal. A month later, he was killed 1991 Azerbaijani Mil Mi-8 shootdown.

One of the schools in the Agjabadi district and one of the ships under the Caspian Shipping Company is named after him.
