= Albert Hayhurst =

English footballer and cricketer

Personal information
- Born: 17 September 1905; Birdwell, Yorkshire, England
- Died: 8 November 1991 (aged 86); Reading, Berkshire, England
- Height: 6 ft 0 in (183 cm)
- Batting: Right-handed
- Bowling: Right-arm fast-medium

Domestic team information
- Years: Team
- 1948–1953: Buckinghamshire
- 1934–1935: Warwickshire

Career statistics
Competition	First-class
Matches	7
Runs scored	98
Batting average	12.25
100s/50s	–/–
Top score	42
Balls bowled	833
Wickets	12
Bowling average	38.08
5 wickets in innings	–
10 wickets in match	–
Best bowling	4/120
Catches/stumpings	2/–
- Source: Cricinfo, 14 May 2011

Albert Hayhurst (17 September 1905 – 8 November 1991) was an English cricketer and footballer. Hayhurst was a right-handed batsman who bowled right-arm fast-medium. He was born in Birdwell, Yorkshire.

Hayhurst made his first-class debut for Warwickshire against Kent in the 1934 County Championship. He played a further 6 first-class matches, the last coming against Glamorgan in the 1935 County Championship. He scored 98 runs in these matches, at a batting average of 12.25 and a high score of 42. With the ball he took 12 wickets at a bowling average of 38.08, with best figures of 4/120.

Hayhurst was later a Minor counties cricketer for Buckinghamshire, who he debuted for in the 1948 Minor Counties Championship against Staffordshire. He played Minor counties cricket for Buckinghamshire from 1948 to 1953, making 24 appearances.

Outside of cricket he played football for Luton Town and Reading as a centre-half in the Football League. For Reading he made 237 appearances, scoring 12 goals, between 1933 and 1938. He died in Reading, Berkshire on 8 November 1991.
