= Ernest Mallinson =

English cricketer and soldier

Personal information
- Full name: Ernest Henry Powell Mallinson
- Born: 14 June 1898; Dulwich, Surrey, England
- Died: 10 November 1991 (aged 93); Shoreham-by-Sea, Sussex, England
- Batting: Unknown
- Bowling: Unknown

Domestic team information
- Years: Team
- 1923/24–1935/36: Europeans
- 1926/27: Army
- 1926/27: Southern Punjab
- 1926/27: Northern India

Career statistics
Competition	First-class
Matches	8
Runs scored	432
Batting average	27.00
100s/50s	1/2
Top score	112
Balls bowled	102
Wickets	6
Bowling average	22.83
5 wickets in innings	–
10 wickets in match	–
Best bowling	4/35
Catches/stumpings	6/–
- Source: ESPNcricinfo, 1 November 2023

Ernest Henry Powell Mallinson (14 June 1898 – 10 November 1991) was an English first-class cricketer, British Indian Army officer, and schoolmaster.

The son of John Mallinson, he was born at Dulwich in June 1898. He was educated in Scotland at Fettes College, where he played for the college cricket team. Mallinson served in the British Indian Army in the First World War, being commissioned as a second lieutenant in February 1918. He was promoted to captain in October 1920, with promotion to captain following in January 1923. In British India, he made his debut in first-class cricket for the Europeans cricket team against the Hindus at Lahore in the 1923–24 Lahore Tournament, scoring 68 runs in the Europeans second innings. Against the Sikhs in the 1925–26 Lahore Tournament, he scored what would be his only first-class century, with a score of 112 opening the batting. In addition to playing for the Europeans, Mallinson also played first-class cricket for the Indian Army cricket team, Southern Punjab and Northern India, all against the touring Marylebone Cricket Club in November 1926. He made two further first-class appearances, both for the Europeans in 1928 and 1935. In eight first-class matches, he scored 432 runs at an average of exactly 27; with the ball, he took 6 wickets at a bowling average of 22.83, with best figures of 4 for 35.

Serving in the Indian Army with the 17th Dogra Regiment by 1932, he was promoted to major in January 1936, prior to being transferred to the unemployed list in April of the same year. Mallinson later became a schoolmaster in Kenya Colony. He died in England at Shoreham-by-Sea in November 1991.
