= Bünyadlı, Khojavend =

Bunyadly / Kamrakar Bünyadlı / Կարմրաքար
- Location within Azerbaijan Location within Karabakh Economic Region
- Coordinates: 39°24′42″N 46°59′01″E
- Country: Azerbaijan
- District: Khojavend
- Time zone: UTC+4 (AZT)

Bunyadly (Bünyadlı) or Kamrakar (Armenian: Կարմրաքար, romanized: Kamrakar) is a village in the Khojavend District of Azerbaijan.
