= Secretary of State of Azerbaijan =

Political position in Azerbaijan (1991–1994)

Secretary of State of the Republic of Azerbaijan Azərbaycanın Dövlət Katibi

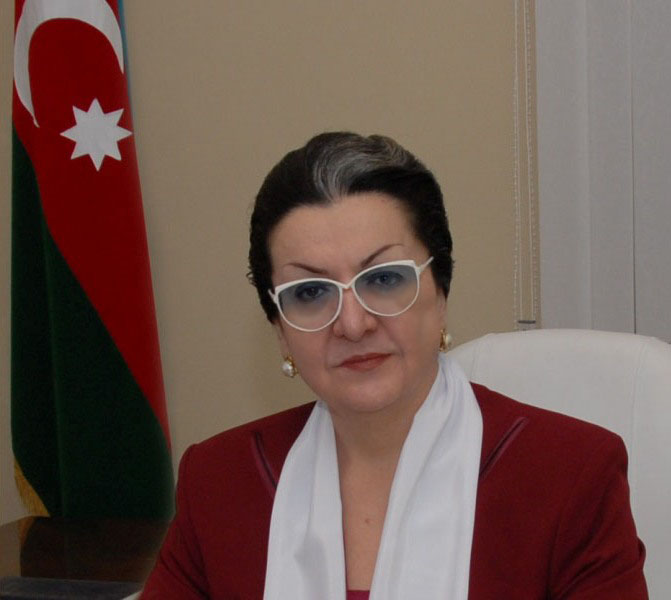
- Last office holder Lala Shevket; July 7, 1993 – January 13, 1994
- State Council of Azerbaijan
- Member of: Cabinet of Azerbaijan
- Reports to: The President
- Residence: Baku
- Appointer: President of Azerbaijan
- Constituting instrument: Constitution of Azerbaijan
- Formation: October 18, 1991
- First holder: Tofig Ismayilov
- Final holder: Lala Shevket
- Unofficial names: State Secretary

The Secretary of State of Azerbaijan (Azərbaycanın Dövlət Katibi) was a political position in that existed in Azerbaijan, existing from 1991 to 1994.

== History ==
=== Establishment ===
The position was created in 1991 to replace in significance the previously existent political position of a 2nd Secretary of the Azerbaijani Communist Party. Since the dissolution of the Party in 1991 by its last First Secretary Ayaz Mutalibov, who became Azerbaijan's first President, there was a need to appoint a second in command to manage the newly created Presidential Administration that took over from the old party apparatus. The first holder of the position was Academician Tofig Ismayilov.

=== Rise in significance ===
The significance of the position varied in time. Under President Heydar Aliyev in 1993 the position rose to become the second after the head of state. Tadeusz Swietochowski wrote, '...Clearly, the number two person in Azerbaijan is Lala Shevket-Hajiyeva, whose title is State Secretary - which does not mean a foreign minister...'

In 1992, the State Secretary was part of the State Defense Committee of the Republic of Azerbaijan and the State Council, which was administered by the Secretary.

=== Fall out of use ===
In January 1994, the last holder of the position, Lala Shevket wrote a resignation letter as a protest against corruption in the government. After her resignation the position was formally dissolved by presidential decree.

== Duties ==
The last holder of the position, Professor Lala Shevket herself told in an interview to Azerbaijan International magazine about the scope of the responsibilities of Azerbaijani Secretary of State:

"There's a big difference between the United States' Secretary of State and Azerbaijan's. Our Secretary of State is actually more like a Vice-President. But at the same time, the role and responsibilities of the American Vice-President and the Azerbaijani Vice-President are also totally different. My responsibility covers all aspects of government - from strategy and ideology to the war, defence, and economy. I manage all these. I have to control and watch everything that is going on in the entire country. I also direct all of the Presidential advisors. And, of course, there's Foreign Relations. The President and I work together and make decisions. If he travels somewhere out of the country, the responsibility of the government lies with me. So, actually, I have more responsibility than the U.S. Vice-President. However, according to the Constitution if something should happen to the President, God forbid, the Head of the Parliament would take the President's place - not the State Secretary."

— Lala Shevket, Azerbaijan International,

In accordance with the regulations on the State Council, he had the authority to organize its work and coordinate the activities of the members of the State Council, to preside over the meetings of the State Council in the absence of the President of the Republic of Azerbaijan or on his instructions.

== Office-holders ==
| Name | Party | Image | President | Term start | Term end |
|---|---|---|---|---|---|
| Tofig Ismayilov | CPSU | | Ayaz Mutallibov | October 18, 1991 | November 20, 1991 |
| Midhat Abasov | Independent | | Ayaz Mutallibov | December 9, 1991 | May 20, 1992 |
| Panah Huseynov | Popular Front of Azerbaijan | | Abulfaz Elchibey | May 20, 1992 | April 28, 1993 |
| Ali Karimli | Popular Front of Azerbaijan | | Abulfaz Elchibey | May 1, 1993 | July 7, 1993 |
| Lala Shevket | Independent | | Heydar Aliyev | July 7, 1993 | January 13, 1994 |
