= Binə, Khojavend =

Bina / Tumi Binə / Տումի
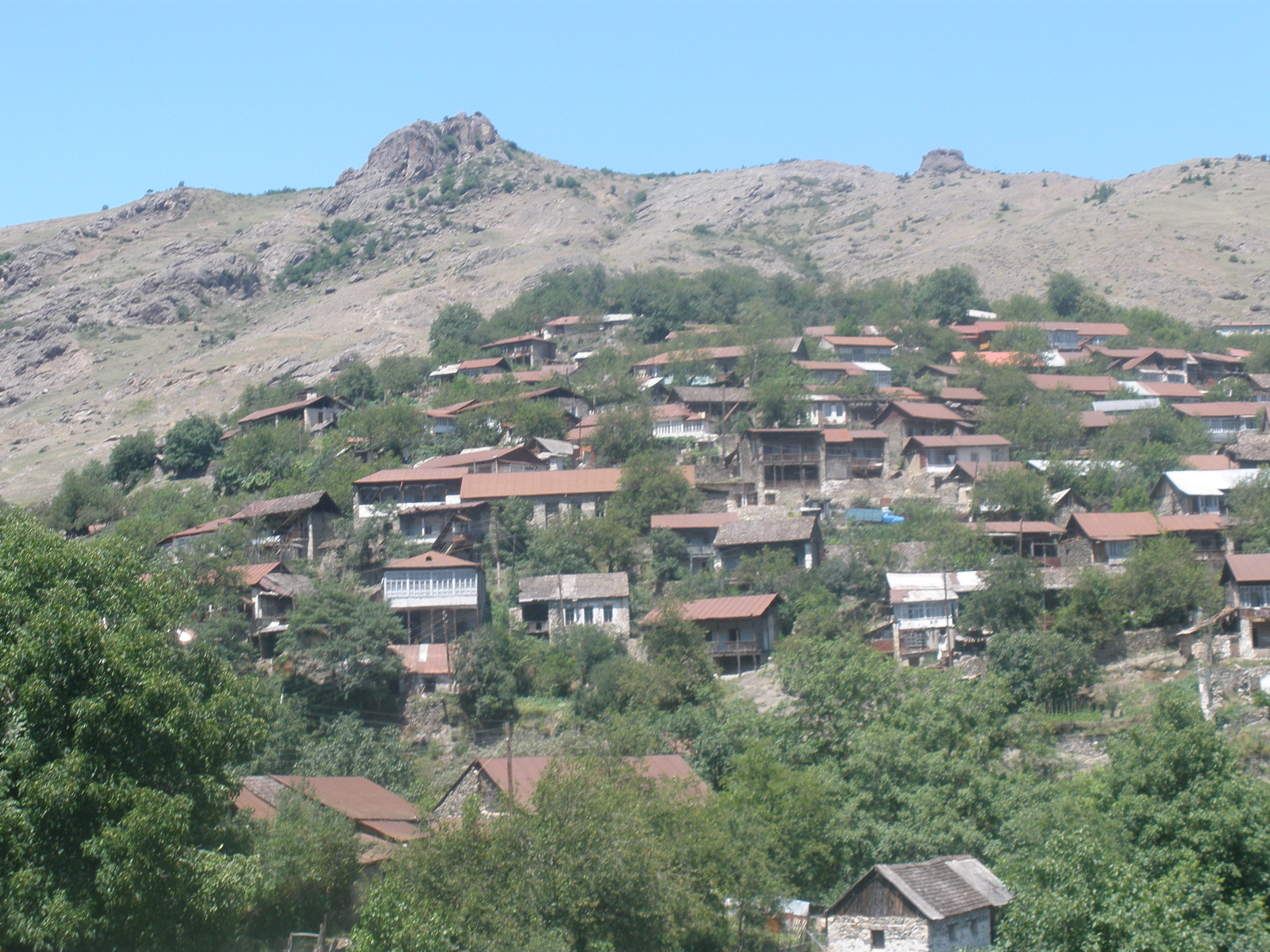

- Location within Azerbaijan Location within Karabakh Economic Region
- Coordinates: 39°34′59″N 46°54′05″E
- Country: Azerbaijan
- District: Khojavend

Population (2015)
  - Total: 746
- Time zone: UTC+4 (AZT)

Bina (Azerbaijani: Binə; Armenian: Բինա) or Tumi (Armenian: Տումի) is a village in the Khojavend District of Azerbaijan, in the region of Nagorno-Karabakh. The village had an ethnic Armenian-majority population prior to the 2020 Nagorno-Karabakh war, and also had an Armenian majority in 1989.

== Toponymy ==
The village was known as Domi (Armenian: Դոմի; Russian: Домы; Azerbaijani: Domı) during the Soviet period.

== History ==
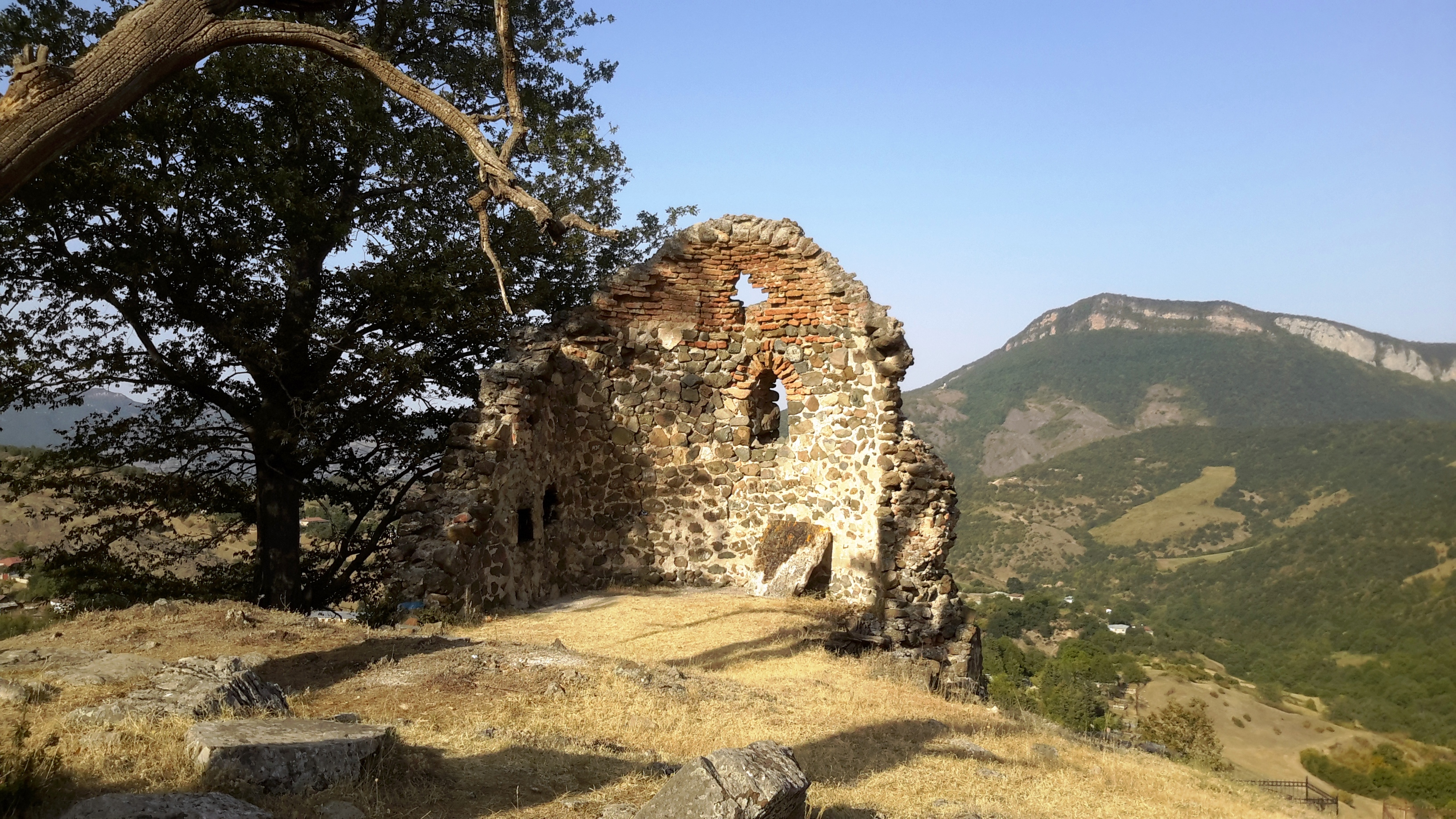
11th-century Church of the Red Cross

During the Soviet period, the village was a part of the Hadrut District of the Nagorno-Karabakh Autonomous Oblast.

The village was administered by the Republic of Artsakh as part of its Hadrut Province after the First Nagorno-Karabakh War. The village was captured in 9 November 2020 by Azerbaijani forces during the 2020 Nagorno-Karabakh war with the Armenian population of the village having previously evacuated.

== Historical heritage sites ==
Historical heritage sites in and around the village include a cemetery from between the 9th and 19th centuries, the 11th-century Church of the Red Cross (Armenian: Եկեղեցի Կարմիր Խաչ, romanized: Yekeghetsi Karmir Khach), a 12th/13th-century khachkar, a 12th/13th-century bridge, the fortress of Ghlen Kar (Armenian: Ղլեն Քար, also known as Dizapayt Fortress and Gorozaberd, Գոռոզաբերդ) from between the 13th and 19th centuries, and a 19th-century spring monument.

== Demographics ==
The village had 760 inhabitants in 2005, and 746 inhabitants in 2015.

== Gallery ==
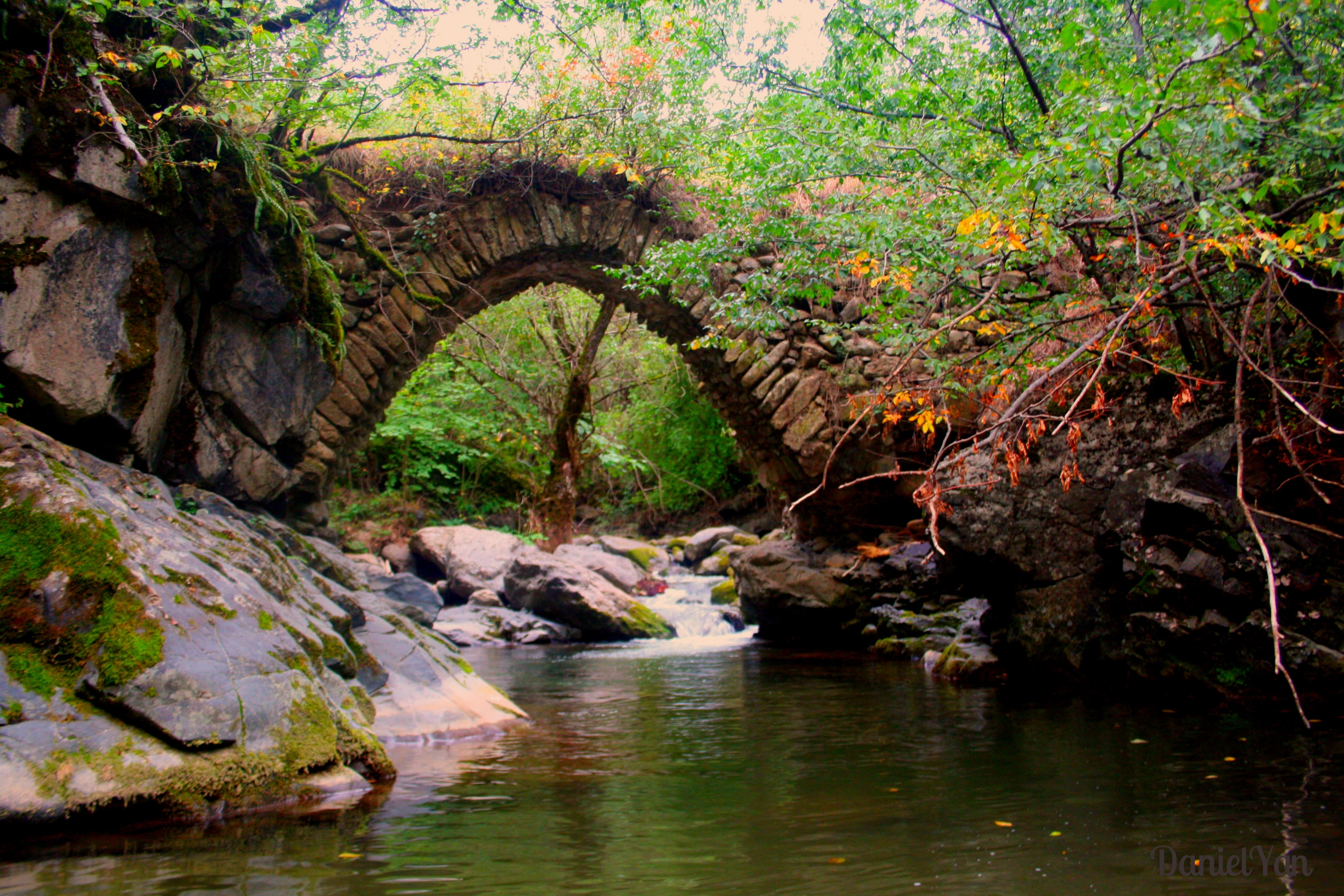
Igakuts Bridge

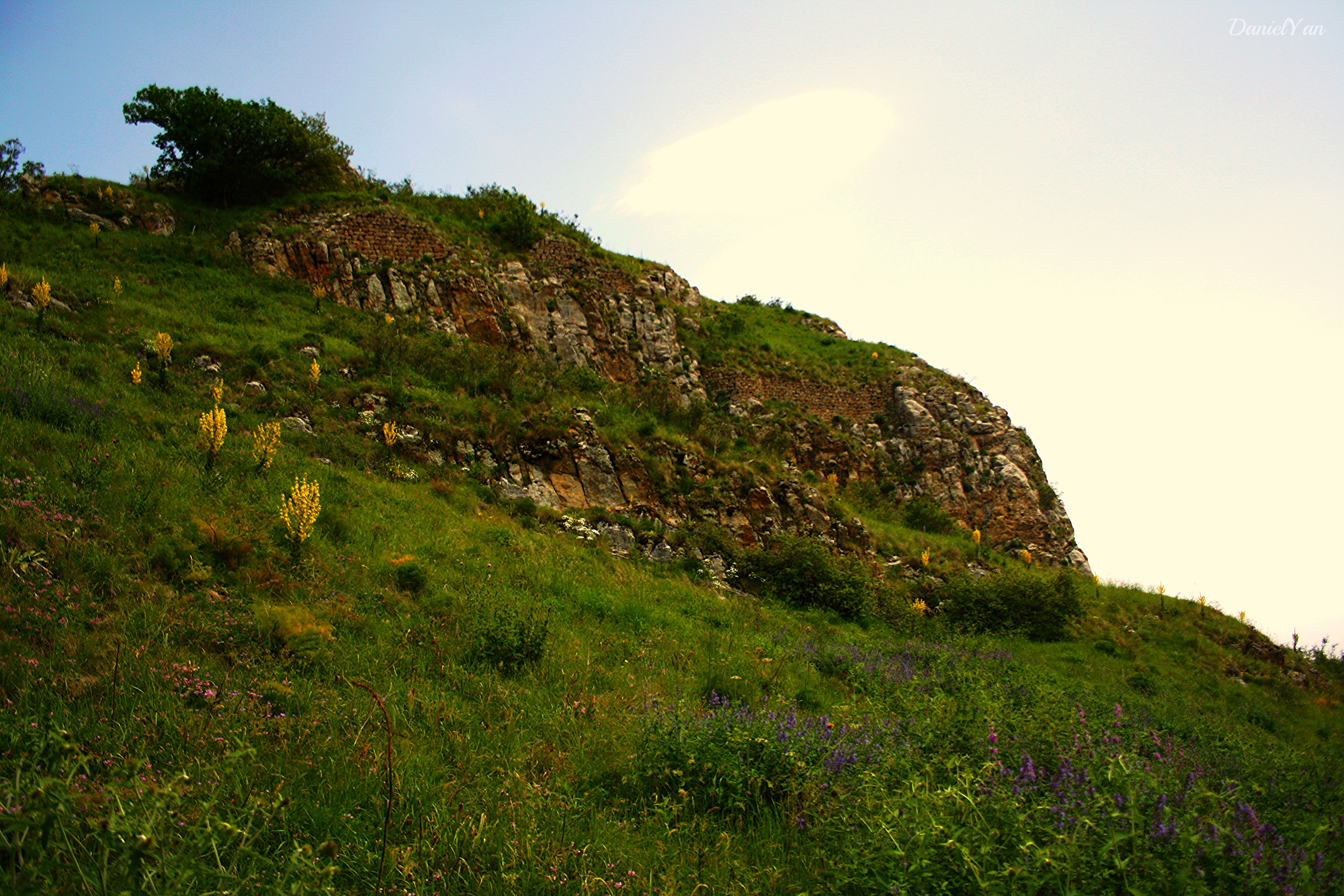
Ghlen Kar Fortress

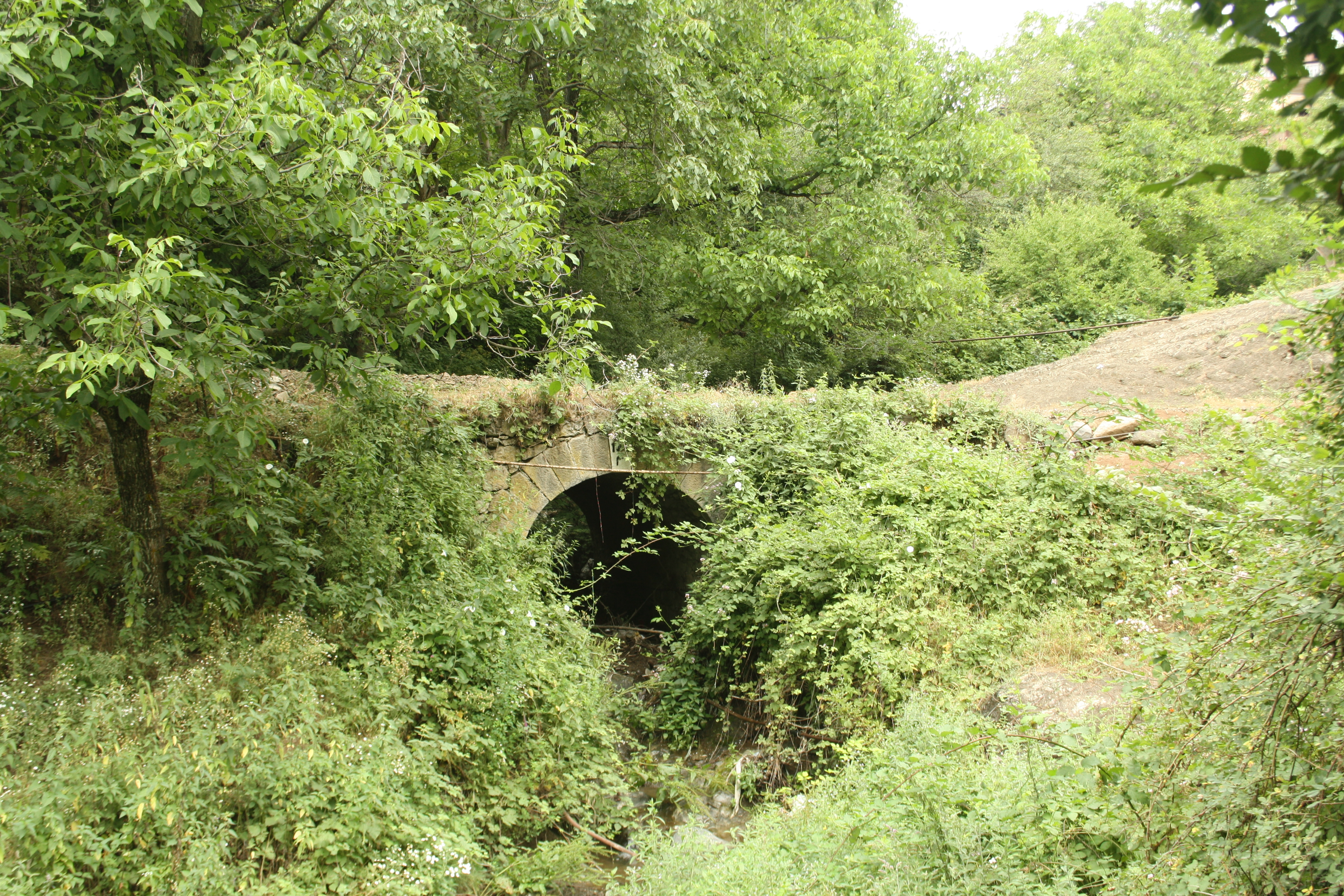
Bridge near Tumi

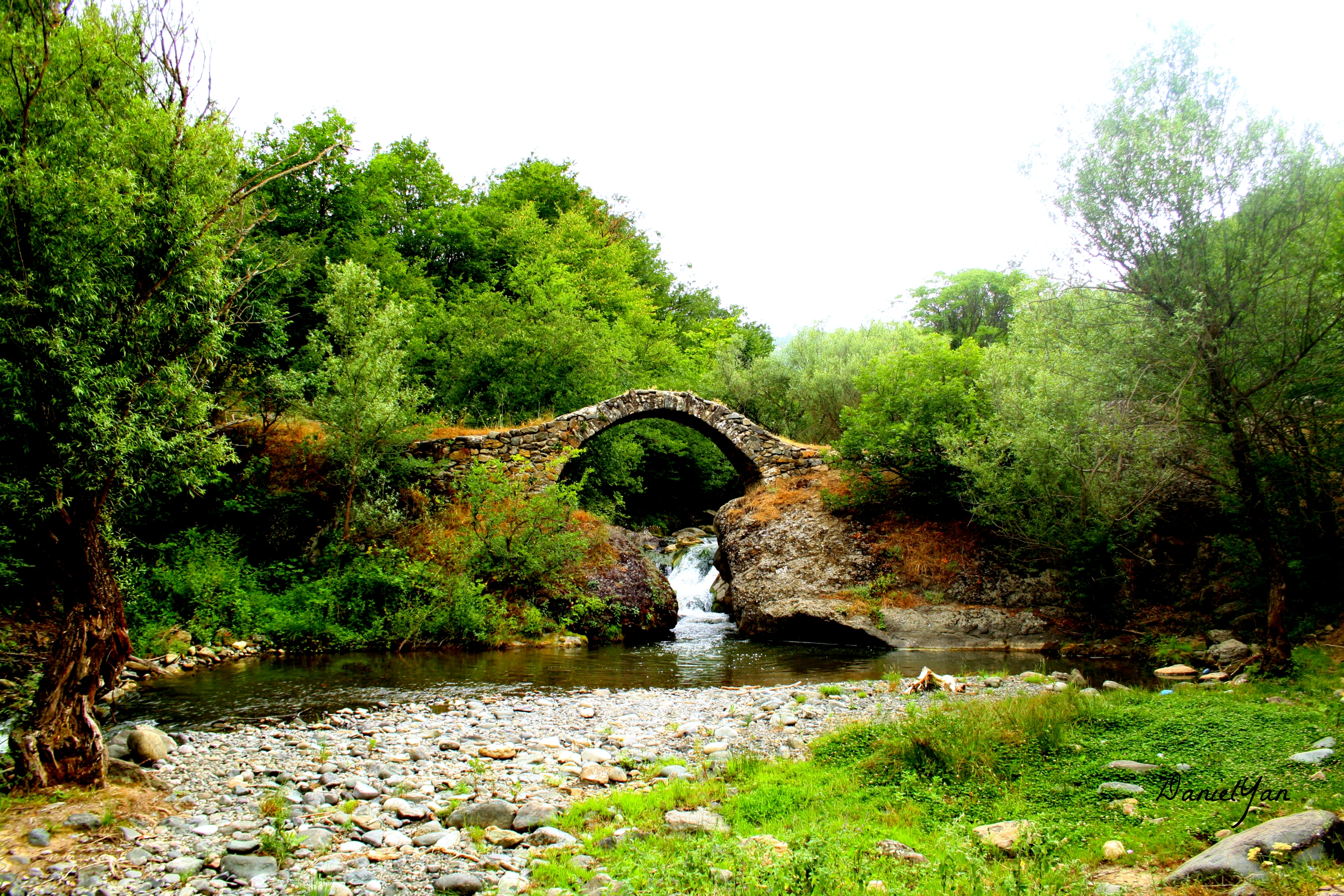
Jrvanes Bridge
