= Karakend =

Karakend / Berdashen Qarakənd / Բերդաշեն
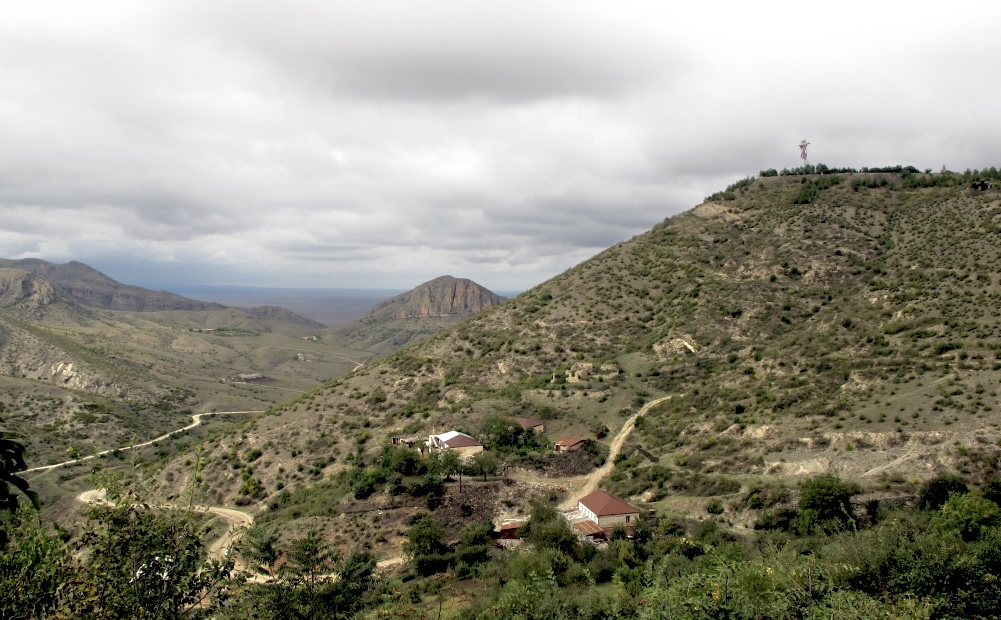

- Location within Azerbaijan Location within Karabakh Economic Region
- Coordinates: 39°50′51″N 47°01′49″E
- Country: Azerbaijan
  - District: Khojavend
- Elevation: 656 m (2,152 ft)

Population (2015)
  - Total: 1,606
- Time zone: UTC+4 (AZT)

Karakend (Note: Also anglicized as Karakent or Garakend) (Armenian: Քարաքենդ; Azerbaijani: Qarakənd, lit. 'black village'), or Berdashen (Armenian: Բերդաշեն, lit. 'village of the fortress') is a village in the Khojavend District of Azerbaijan, in the disputed region of Nagorno-Karabakh. Until 2023 it was controlled by the breakaway Republic of Artsakh. The village had an ethnic Armenian-majority population until the expulsion of the Armenian population of Nagorno-Karabakh by Azerbaijan following the 2023 Azerbaijani offensive in Nagorno-Karabakh.

== History ==
During the Soviet period, the village was a part of the Martuni District of the Nagorno-Karabakh Autonomous Oblast.

During the First Nagorno-Karabakh War, on November 20, 1991, an Azerbaijani MI-8 military helicopter, carrying a peacekeeping mission team consisting of 13 Azerbaijani government officials, 2 Russian and 1 Kazakhstani Ministry of Internal Affairs officials, 3 Azerbaijani journalists and 3 helicopter crewmen was shot down by Armenian forces near the village. All 22 people (19 passengers and 3 crew) on board were killed in the crash.

== Historical heritage sites ==
Historical heritage sites in and around the village include a 12th-century khachkar, the 17th-century church of Surb Astvatsatsin (Armenian: Սուրբ Աստվածածին, lit. 'Holy Mother of God'), the chapel of Mets Nahatak (Armenian: Մեծ Նահատակ) built in 1676, a 17th/18th-century shrine and the fortress of Kusaberd (Armenian: Կուսաբերդ), also known as Aghjkaberd (Armenian: Աղջկաբերդ).

== Economy and culture ==
As of 2015, the village has a municipal building, a house of culture, a secondary school, a kindergarten, six shops, and a medical centre.

== Demographics ==
The village had 1,498 inhabitants in 2005, and 1,606 inhabitants in 2015.

== Gallery ==
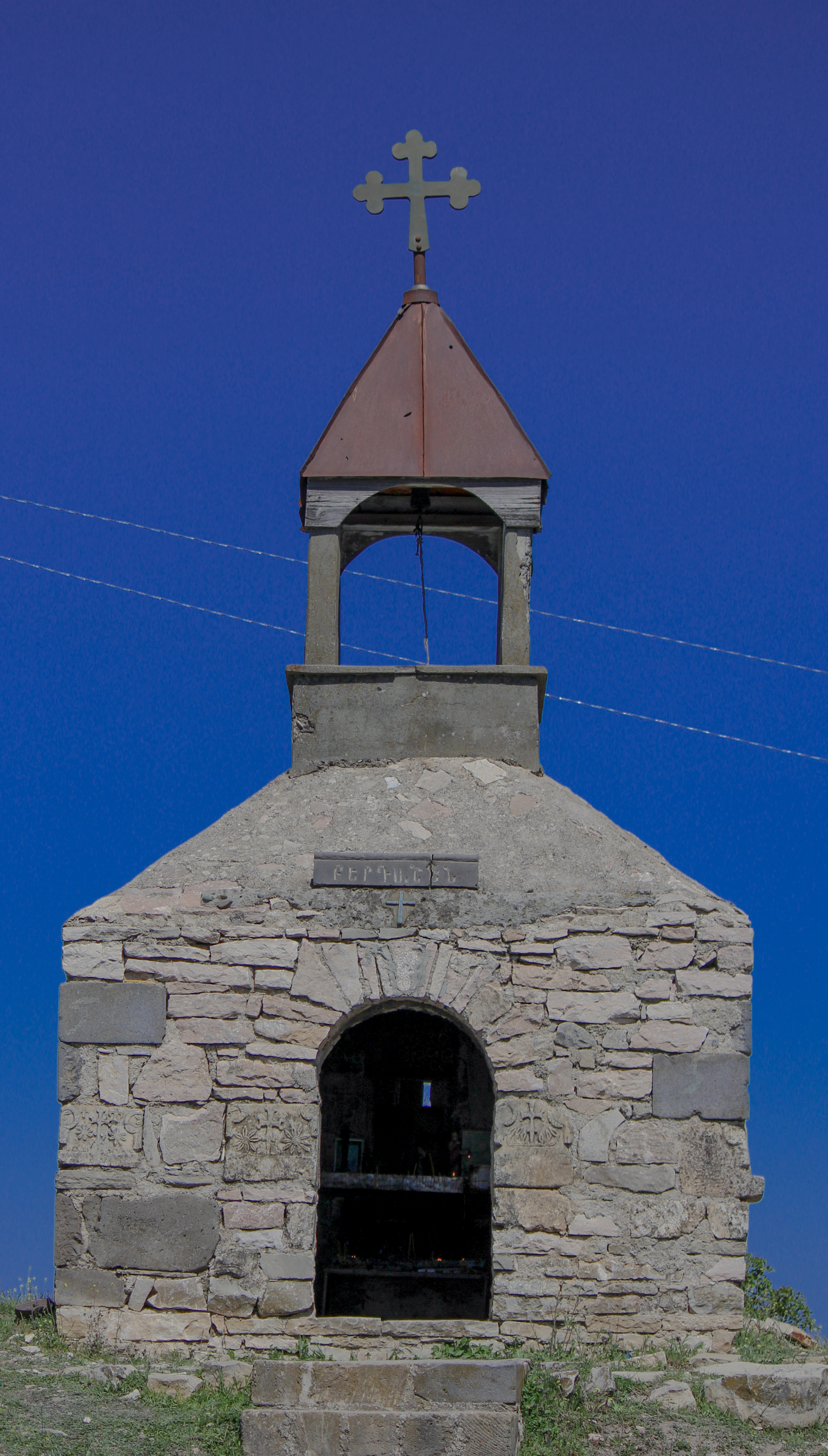
"Pitsi Nahatak" chapel

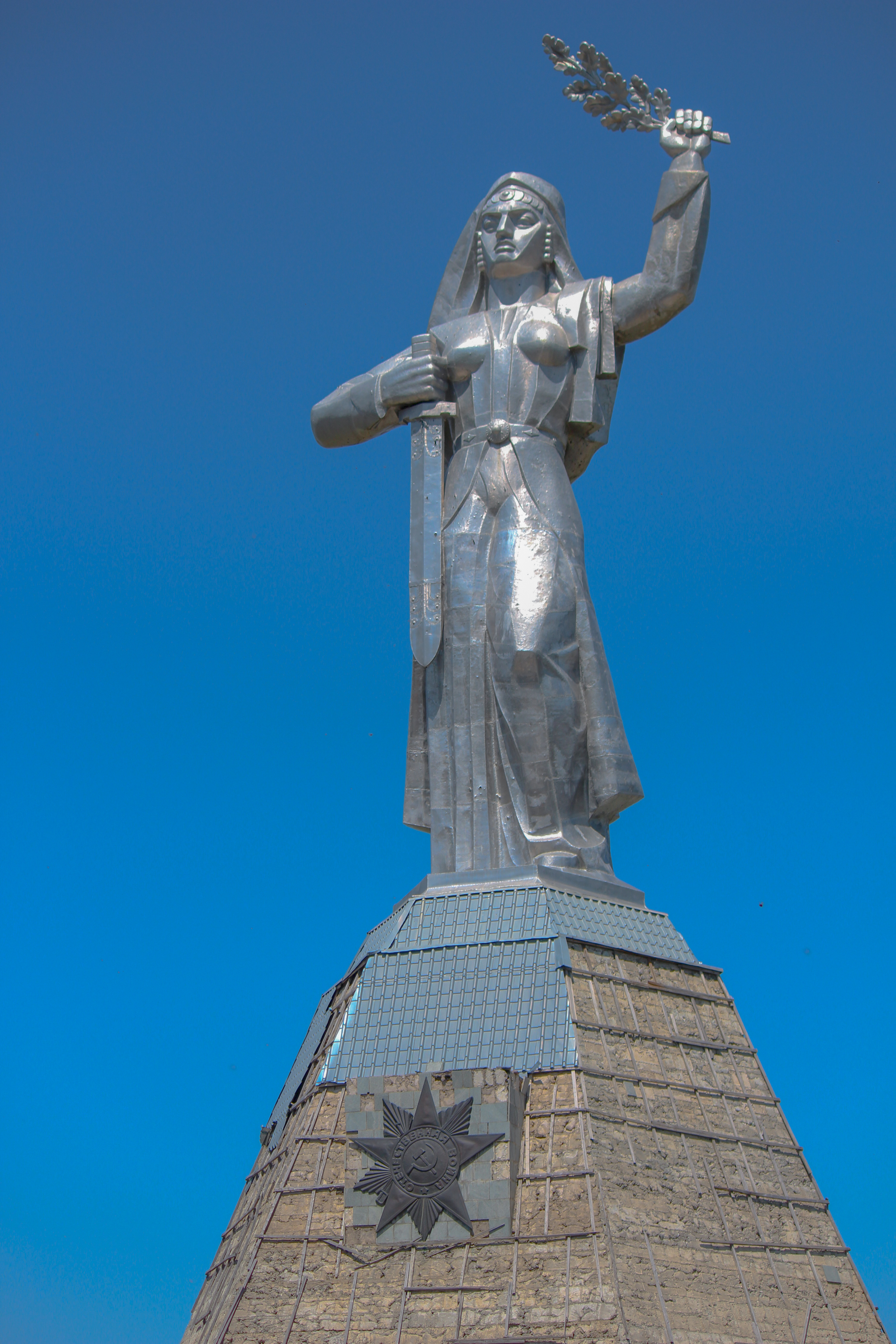
Kusaberd-Aghjkaberd monument
