= Khojavend District =

District in western Azerbaijan

Coordinates: 40°02′N 47°25′E

- District
- Map of Azerbaijan showing Khojavend District
- Country: Azerbaijan
- Region: Karabakh
- Established: 26 November 1991
- Capital: Khojavend
- Settlements: 83

Government
  - Governor: Eyvaz Huseynov

Area
  - Total: 1,460 km^{2} (560 sq mi)

Population (2020)
  - Total: 44,100
  - Density: 30.2/km^{2} (78.2/sq mi)
- Time zone: UTC+4 (AZT)
- Postal code: 2801
- Website: xocavend-ih.gov.az

Khojavend District (Azerbaijani: Xocavənd rayonu) is one of the 66 districts of Azerbaijan. It is located in the west of the country in the Karabakh Economic Region. The district borders the districts of Lachin, Shusha, Khojaly, Aghdam, Aghjabadi, Fuzuli, Jabrayil, and Qubadli. Its capital and largest city is Khojavend. As of 2020, the district had a nominal population of 44,100.

== History ==
=== Armenian control (1990s–2020) ===
Most of the area of the district was under the effective control of the self-declared Republic of Artsakh since the First Nagorno-Karabakh War from the early 1990s until late 2020, with the exception of the easternmost part, which remained under Azerbaijani control. Within Artsakh, its northeast half was administratively part of Martuni Province and the rest as part of Hadrut Province.

=== Return to Azerbaijani control ===
An armed conflict erupted between the Republic of Artsakh and Azerbaijan in late September 2020 which saw more parts of the district return to Azerbaijani control.

On October 9, 2020, it was announced that the city of Hadrut and eight villages (one of them is part of Khojavend district) had been recaptured by the Azerbaijani Army The town of Hadrut was subsequently declared as the provisional administrative centre of the district.

On October 14, 2020, the President of Azerbaijan announced that Bulutan, Malikjanli, Kamartuk, Taka and Taghaser villages of the district had been recaptured by the Azerbaijani Army.

On October 16, 2020, it was announced that Azerbaijan had taken control of three more villages in the district.

On October 20, 2020, the President of Azerbaijan announced the recapture of five more villages (Aghjakand, Mulkudara, Dashbashi, Gunashli (formerly known as Norashen), and Vang of the district from Armenian forces.

On October 23, 2020, it was announced that Azerbaijan recaptures villages of Dolanlar and Bünyadlı.

On November 7, 2020, it was announced that Azerbaijan had taken control of Ataqut and Tsakuri villages of the district along with 14 ones of Fuzuli, Jabrayil, Khojaly, Qubadli and the Zangilan districts.

On November 9, 2020, the President of Azerbaijan announced the recapture of Susanlıq, Domi, Tuğ, Akaku, Azıx, Böyük Tağlar, Salakətin, Zoğalbulaq, Aragül, Tağavard, Böyük Tağavard, Zərdanaşen and Şəhər villages along with 58 villages of Fuzuli, Khojaly, Qubadli, Zangilan and Lachin districts

Following the 2023 Nagorno-Karabakh clashes, Khojavend came under control of Azerbaijani forces on 26 September 2023. The monument of Armenian revolutionary hero Monte Melkonian was removed by the Azeris upon taking over the region.

== See also ==
- Aruş
