= Azerbaijani Community of Nagorno-Karabakh =

Demographics of Azerbaijan

- Dağlıq Qarabağın Azərbaycanlı İcması
- Coat of Arms of Azerbaijan

Agency overview
- Formed: March 24, 1992
- Dissolved: April 30, 2021
- Headquarters: Baku, Azerbaijan Republic
- Agency executive: Tural Ganjaliyev, Leader of Azerbaijani Community of Nagorno-Karabakh
- Website: http://www.karabakh.az

The Azerbaijani Community of Nagorno-Karabakh (Azerbaijani: Dağlıq Qarabağın Azərbaycanlı İcması), also known as the Azerbaijani Community of Nagorno-Karabakh Social Union or the Azerbaijani Community of Nagorno-Karabakh in exile, was an association representing the Azerbaijani community of Nagorno-Karabakh in exile from May 1994 until April 2021.

On April 30, 2021, the dissolution of the association was announced after the return of large areas of Nagorno-Karabakh to Azerbaijani control after the Second Nagorno-Karabakh War.

== History ==
According to the 1979 Soviet census, which was the last census taken before the beginning of the Nagorno-Karabakh conflict, there were 37,264 ethnic Azeris (or 23% of the total population) living in the mainly Armenian-populated Nagorno-Karabakh Autonomous Oblast. Azeris constituted the majority in the Shusha District with over 80% of the total population, in addition to forming between 15% and 26% of the population of the remaining four districts. The population of the regional capital of Stepanakert consisted of 11% ethnic Azeris. Major Azeri settlements outside of the Shusha District included Sırxavənd, İmarət Qərvənd, Umudlu, and Çərəktar in the Mardakert District; Xocalı, Kərkicahan, Malıbəyli, Yuxarı Quşçular, Aşağı Quşçular, Cəmilli, and Meşəli in the Askeran District; Tuğ and Salaketin in the Hadrut District; and Qaradağlı, Muğanlı, Əmiranlar, and Divanlılar in the Martuni District.

As result of attacks and military operations in the active phase of the conflict starting in 1991, almost all Azeris were forced to abandon their homes. There have been recorded cases of violence against Azeri civilians by Armenian militants (in Meşəli), civil casualties as a result of shelling (in Malıbəyli and Aşağı Quşçular) and burning down of entire villages (İmarət Qərvənd).

Nizami Bahmanov, who had been appointed the Head of Executive Power of Shusha on April 8, 1992, became the first elected leader of the Azeri community. Since Shusha was the only city in Nagorno-Karabakh with a majority Azerbaijani population, its executive officer was chosen to represent the whole Azerbaijani community of Karabakh. When a provisional ceasefire agreement was signed by Azerbaijan, Armenia and a representative of the Armenians of Nagorno-Karabakh, Bahmanov was expected to add his signature to the document as well, but was away on that day. Nevertheless, along with their visits to Stepanakert, mediators of the OSCE Minsk Group hold regular meetings with the Azeri community as part of the peace process.

The status of the Azerbaijani Community of Nagorno-Karabakh Social Union, co-founded by Nizami Bahmanov, member of Azerbaijani Parliament, Havva Mammadova and Elman Mammadov, was formally confirmed by the Ministry of Justice of Azerbaijan in September 2006.

Bahmanov died on September 13, 2008, while holding a meeting in his office. The office of the leader of Azerbaijani Community of Nagorno-Karabakh remained unoccupied until February 27, 2009, when Bayram Safarov was appointed the Head of Executive Power of Shusha, subsequently filling the office of leader of Azerbaijani Community of Nagorno-Karabakh. The name of the organization was changed to Azerbaijani Community of Nagorno-Karabakh Public Union on June 5, 2010. In 2018, diplomat Tural Ganjaliyev, a native of Shusha, replaced Safarov as the head of the community, who held the post until the organization was dissolved in 2021.

== Structure ==
The union was a non-governmental organization, gaining no financial profit and based on volunteer membership. Its activities covered the whole territory of Azerbaijan. The union's main purpose was the restoration of the territorial integrity of Azerbaijan and the return of Azerbaijani IDPs from Karabakh to their homes.

== See also ==
- Cabinet of Azerbaijan
- Non-governmental organisations in Azerbaijan
- Political status of Nagorno-Karabakh
