= Kərəmli =

Kərəmli may refer to:

- Kərəmli, Goygol, Azerbaijan
- Kərəmli, Kalbajar, Azerbaijan
