= Flora Gasimova =

Azerbaijani politician (born 1947)

Flora Gasimova Flora Qasımova

Member of National Assembly of Azerbaijan for 122nd Khankendi district
- In office 7 November 2010 – 10 March 2020
- Preceded by: Havva Mammadova
- Succeeded by: Tural Ganjaliyev

Personal details
- Born: 1947 (age 78–79) Khankendi, Azerbaijani SSR, Soviet Union

Flora Gasim gyzy Gasimova (Azerbaijani: Flora Qasım qızı Qasımova; born 1947) is an Azerbaijani politician who served as the Member of National Assembly of Azerbaijan from the 122nd Khankendi electoral district.

== Early life ==
Gasimova was born in 1947 in Khankendi. She attended secondary school there. She started her first job in Khankendi and taught mathematics at the school where she graduated. She was elected secretary of the School Komsomol Organization for being active in public affairs. Later, Gasimova was elected a member of the Plenum of the Provincial Komsomol Committee. In 1973, she was elected a deputy of the regional council. After establishing a family life, she leaves Khankendi.

== Political career ==
Gasimova was elected to the National Assembly of Azerbaijan from the 122nd Khankendi electoral district during 2010 parliamentary elections, winning 55.1% of votes. She replaced Havva Mammadova who did not run for re-election.

== Personal life ==
Gasimova was married to Shirin Mirzayev, a recipient of the National Hero of Azerbaijan who was killed in the First Nagorno-Karabakh War. They got married in 1976 and had two children: one son and one daughter.

== See also ==
- Azerbaijani Community of Nagorno-Karabakh
- Women in Azerbaijan
