= Karabakh =

- Region
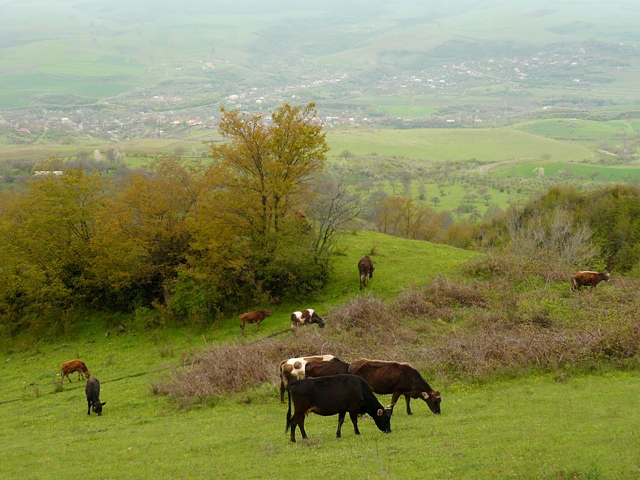
- A landscape in Nagorno-Karabakh - a view of the municipality of Karmir Shuka
- Etymology: "Black garden"
- Map of Karabakh within modern borders. Typical definition of Karabakh. Maximum historical definition of Karabakh.
- Country: Azerbaijan and Armenia

Karabakh (Azerbaijani: Qarabağ [ɡɑɾɑˈbɑɣ]; Armenian: Ղարաբաղ, romanized: Ġarabaġ [ʁɑɾɑˈbɑʁ]) is a geographic region in southwestern Azerbaijan and eastern Armenia, extending from the highlands of the Lesser Caucasus down to the lowlands between the rivers Kura and Aras. It is divided into three regions: Highland Karabakh, Lowland Karabakh (the steppes between the Kura and Aras rivers), and the eastern slopes of the Zangezur Mountains (roughly Syunik and Kalbajar–Lachin).

== Etymology ==
The name Karabakh, transliterated from the Russian version of the word Карабах, derives from the Azerbaijani Qarabağ, which is generally believed to be a compound of the Turkic word kara (black) and the Iranian word bagh (garden), literally meaning "black garden." However, there are some other hypotheses.

Russian Orientalist Vladimir Minorsky believed that the name possibly connected to an extinct Turkic tribe of the same name. By comparison, there are similar toponyms in Azerbaijan, Iran, Turkey and Afghanistan.

According to Iranian linguist Abdolali Karang, kara could have derived from kaleh or kala, which means "large" in the Harzani dialect of the extinct Iranian Old Azeri language. The Iranian-Azerbaijani historian Ahmad Kasravi also speaks of the translation of kara as "large" and not "black." The kara prefix has also been used for other nearby regions and landmarks, such as Karadagh (dagh "mountain") referring to a mountain range, and Karakilise (kilise "church") referring to the largest church complex in its area, built mainly with white stone, the Monastery of Saint Thaddeus. In the sense of "large," Karakilise would translate to "large church," and Karabakh would translate to "large garden."

Another theory, proposed by Armenian historian Bagrat Ulubabyan, is that, along with the "large" translation of kara, the bagh component was derived from the nearby canton called Baghk, which at some point was part of Melikdoms of Karabakh within modern-day Karabakh – Dizak and the Kingdom of Syunik (in Baghk, the -k suffix is a plural nominative case marker also used to form names of countries and regions in Classical Armenian). In this sense, Karabakh would translate to "Greater Baghk."

The placename is first mentioned in the thirteenth and fourteenth centuries in The Georgian Chronicles (Georgian: ქართლის ცხოვრება "Life of Kartli"), and in Persian sources. The name became common after the 1230s when the region was conquered by the Mongols. The first time the name was mentioned in an Armenian source was in the fifteenth century, in Thomas of Metsoph's History of Tamerlane and His Successors.

== Geography ==
Karabakh is a landlocked region located in the southeast of Armenia and the west of Azerbaijan. There is currently no official designation for what constitutes the whole of Karabakh. Historically, the maximum extent of what could be considered Karabakh was during the existence of the Karabakh Khanate in the 18th century, which extended from the Zangezur Mountains in the west, following eastwards along the Aras river to the point where it meets with the Kura river in the Kur-Araz Lowland. Following the Kura river north, it stretched as far as what is today the Mingachevir reservoir before turning back to the Zangezur Mountains through the Murov Mountains. However, when not referring to the territory covered by the Karabakh Khanate, the northern regions are often excluded (modern-day Goranboy and Yevlakh). During the Russian Empire, the eastern lowlands where the Kura and Aras rivers meet (mostly modern-day Imishli) were also excluded, but most pre-Elisabethpol maps include that region in Karabakh.

The three regions of Karabakh roughly corresponding to modern-day provinces and districts
| Zangezur | Highlands or mountainous region | Lowlands or steppe |
|---|---|---|
| Armenia: Syunik Azerbaijan: Lachin, Qubadli, Zangilan | Azerbaijan: Kalbajar, Tartar, Khojaly, Khankendi, Agdam, Shusha, Khojavend, Jabrayil, Fuzuli | Azerbaijan: Barda, Aghjabadi, Beylagan. Historically also included Imishli and small parts of north-western Saatly and Sabirabad. |

== History ==
=== Antiquity ===
The region today referred to as Karabakh, which was populated with various Caucasian tribes, is believed to have been conquered by the Kingdom of Armenia in the 2nd century BC and organized as parts of the Artsakh, Utik and the southern regions of Syunik provinces. However, it is possible that the region had earlier been part of the Satrapy of Armenia under the Orontid dynasty from as early as the 4th century BC. After the partition of Armenia by Rome and Persia in 387 AD, Artsakh and Utik became a part of the Caucasian Albanian satrapy of Sassanian Persia, while Syunik remained in Armenia.

=== Middle Ages ===
The Arab invasions later led to the rise of several Armenian princes who came to establish their dominance in the region. Centuries of constant warfare on the Armenian Plateau forced many Armenians, including those in the Karabakh region, to emigrate and settle elsewhere. During the period of Mongol domination, a great number of Armenians left Lowland Karabakh and sought refuge in the mountainous (Highland) heights of the region.

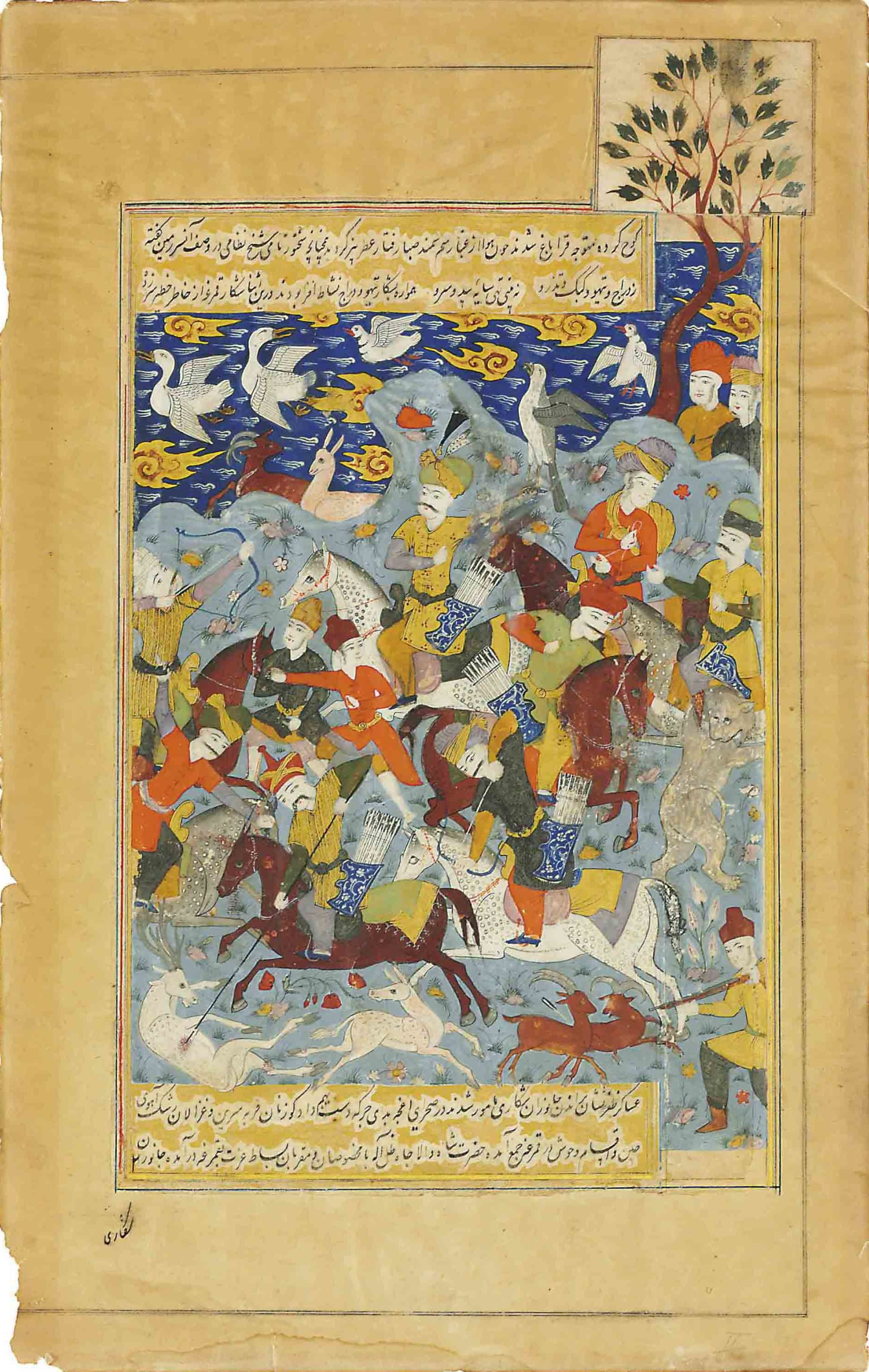
Persian miniature depicting Shah Abbas the Great hunting in Karabakh. From an illustrated history created in 17th-century Safavid Iran

From the 11th century onwards, Karabakh became home to numerous Oghuz Turkic tribes, the ancestors of the modern Azerbaijanis, who stuck to the nomadic way of life, circulating between the winter pastures in Karabakh lowlands and the summer pastures in Karabakh highlands. These tribes dominated the region, and were key allies of the Safavid Empire, which ruled over Karabakh from the 16th to early 18th century.

In the fifteenth century, the German traveler Johann Schiltberger visited Lowland Karabakh and described it as a large and beautiful plain in Armenia, ruled by Muslims. Highland Karabakh from 821 until the early 19th century passed under the hands of a number of states, including the Abbasid Caliphate, Bagratid Armenia, the Mongol Ilkhanate and Jalayirid Sultanates, the Turkic Qara Qoyunlu, Aq Qoyunlu, and Safavid Iran (the province of Karabakh). Armenian princes of the times ruled as vassal territories by the Armenian House of Khachen and its several lines, the latter Melikdoms of Karabakh. The Safavid Shah ("King") Tahmasp I (r. 1524–1576) appointed the family of Shahverdi Sultan, who hailed from the Ziad-oglu branch of the Qajar tribe, as governors of Karabakh. It was also invaded and ruled by Ottoman Empire between 1578–1605 and again between 1723 and 1736, as they briefly conquered it during the Ottoman-Safavid War of 1578-1590 and during the disintegration of Safavid Iran, respectively. In 1747, Panah Ali Khan, a local Turkic chieftain from the Javanshir clan, seized control of the region after the death of the Persian ruler Nader Shah, and both Lower Karabakh and Highland Karabakh comprised the new Karabakh Khanate. Qajar Iran reestablished rule over the region several years later.

=== Early Modern Age ===
In 1813, under the terms of the Treaty of Gulistan, the region of Karabakh was lost by Iran to the Russian Empire. Under Russian rule, Karabakh (both Lowland and Highland) was a region with an area of 13,600 km^{2} (5,250 sq mi), with Shusha (Shushi) as its most prominent city. Its population consisted of Armenians and Muslims (mainly of Tatars, later known as Azerbaijanis, but also Kurds). The Russians conducted a census in 1823 and had tallied the number of villages (though not the number of people) and assessed the tax basis of the entire Karabakh khanate, which also included Lowland Karabakh. It is probable that the Armenians formed the majority of the population of Eastern Armenia at the turn of the seventeenth century, but following Shah Abbas I's massive relocation of Armenians in 1604–05 their numbers decreased markedly, as they eventually became a minority among their Muslim neighbors.

According to the statistics of the initial survey carried out by the Russians in 1823 and an official one published in 1836, Highland Karabakh was found almost overwhelmingly Armenian in population (96.7%). In contrast, the population of the Karabakh khanate, taken as a whole, was largely made up of Muslims (91% Muslim versus 9% Armenian). A decade after the Russian annexation of the region, many Armenians who had fled Karabakh during the reign of Ibrahim Khalil Khan (1730–1806) and settled in Yerevan, Ganja, and parts of Georgia were repatriated to their villages, many of which had been left derelict. An additional 279 Armenian families were settled in the villages of Ghapan and Meghri in Syunik. Though some of the returning Armenians wished to settle in Karabakh, they were told by Russian authorities that there was no room for them. This took place at the same time as many of the region's Muslims departed for the Ottoman Empire and Qajar Iran. The population of Karabakh, according to the official returns of 1832, consisted of 13,965 Muslim and 1,491 Armenian families, besides some Nestorian Christians and Romani people. The limited population was ascribed to the frequent wars and emigration of many Muslim families to Iran since the region's subjection to Russia, although many Armenians were induced by the Russian government, after the Treaty of Turkmenchay, to emigrate from Iran to Karabakh.

Censuses and surveys, which were conducted in winter, did not count tens of thousands Azeri nomads, who stayed in the lowlands during winter and were migrating en masse to the summer pastures in Mountainous Karabakh during the warmer months. Seasonal demographic changes were significant, as e.g. in 1845 in historic Karabakh the population included 30,000 Armenians and 62,000 Muslims (Azeris), of whom approximately 50,000 were nomads, who circulated between Lowland and Mountainous Karabakh.

In 1828 the Karabakh khanate was dissolved and in 1840 it was absorbed into the Kaspijskaya oblast, and subsequently, in 1846, made a part of Shemakha Governorate. In 1876 it was made a part of the Elisabethpol Governorate, an administrative arrangement which remained in place until the Russian Empire collapsed in 1917.

=== Modern era ===
==== Independence and Soviet era ====
After the dissolution of Russian Empire Karabakh, Zangezur and Nakhchivan were disputed between newly established republics of Armenia and Azerbaijan. Fighting between two republics broke out. Following the defeat of the Ottoman Empire in World War I, British troops occupied the South Caucasus. The British command affirmed Khosrov bey Sultanov (an appointee of the Azerbaijani government) as provisional governor-general of Karabakh and Zangezur, pending a final decision at the Paris Peace Conference. The local council representing the Karabakh Armenian community consented to this decision until, in August 1919, the region was made subject to Azerbaijan military jurisdiction in advance of Azerbaijan's prospective annexation of Karabakh. Karabakh Armenians accused Azerbaijan of violating the letter of the 1919 agreement and, with the support of emissaries from Armenia, in March 1920 launched an ill-fated rebellion in Shusha. The Azerbaijani forces quickly suppressed the uprising, massacring and expelling the Armenian population of Shusha and establishing control over the main centers of Karabakh (Shusha, Khankendi, Askeran), although fighting in the countryside of Mountainous Karabakh continued. In April 1920, the Red Army occupied Azerbaijan and in December, Armenia. The issue of Karabakh's status was taken up by the Soviet authorities. In 1921 after the heavy trilateral negotiations, the Bolsheviks decided that Karabakh would remain within the borders of the new Soviet republic of Azerbaijan.

In 1923, the Armenian-inhabited parts of Mountainous Karabakh were made a part of the newly established Nagorno-Karabakh Autonomous Oblast (NKAO), an administrative entity within the Azerbaijan SSR. According to the first census of this administrative unit the population was 94% Armenian, however, this census did not count a considerable Azeri nomadic population. The NKAO consisted of the Armenian-dominated part of historical Mountainous Karabakh and many Azeri villages of this region were administratively excluded from the former.

During the Soviet period, several attempts were made by the authorities of the Armenian SSR to unite it with the NKAO but these proposals never found any support in Moscow.

==== Nagorno-Karabakh conflict ====
In February 1988, within the context of Mikhail Gorbachev's glasnost and perestroika policies, the Supreme Soviet of the NKAO voted to unite itself with Armenia. By the summer of 1989 the Armenian-populated areas of the NKAO were under blockade by Azerbaijan as a response to Armenia's blockade against Nakhchivan, cutting road and rail links to the outside world. On July 12 the Nagorno-Karabakh AO Supreme Soviet voted to secede from Azerbaijan, which was rejected unanimously by the Supreme Soviet of USSR, declaring NKAO had no right to secede from Azerbaijan SSR under Soviet Constitution. Soviet authorities in Moscow then placed the region under its direct rule, installing a special commission to govern the region. In November 1989 the Kremlin returned the oblast to Azerbaijani control. The local government in the region of Shahumian also declared its independence from the Azerbaijan SSR in 1991.

In late 1991, the Armenian representatives in the local government of the NKAO proclaimed the region a republic, independent from Azerbaijan. Most of upper Karabakh and portions of lowland Karabakh came under the control of Armenian forces following the First Nagorno-Karabakh war. The region's Azerbaijani inhabitants were expelled from the territories that came under Armenian control.

While Nagorno-Karabakh remained an internationally recognised territory of Azerbaijan, the four UN Security Council resolutions, adopted in 1993 and demanding immediate withdrawal of the Armenian occupying forces from all occupied regions of Azerbaijan, remained unfulfilled until 2020. In 2020, a new war erupted in the region, which saw Azerbaijan retake control of most of southern Karabakh (Fuzuli, Jabrayil, Zangilan, Qubadli, Hadrut districts) and parts of north-eastern Karabakh (Talish, Madagiz). A trilateral ceasefire agreement signed on 10 November 2020 ended the war and forced Armenia to return all of the remaining territories surrounding Nagorno-Karabakh.

== Demographics ==
The earliest concrete numbers about the population of Karabakh is from a survey prepared by the Russian imperial authorities in 1823. According to the census, 91% of the villages were registered as "Muslims", while 9% were "Armenians". Almost all of the Armenians compactly resided in its mountainous parts (on the territory of the five traditional Armenian principalities) where they constituted an absolute demographic majority, such that 90.8% of recorded villages were Armenians, whilst 9.2% were Tatar (later known as Azerbaijani).

During the Russian Empire, the entire Karabakh region (mountainous and flatland) was divided into four counties (uezds) within the Elizavetpol Governorate: Jevanshir, Zangezur, Jebrail, and Shusha. Their ethnic composition in 1897 and 1916 was as follows:

| Uezd | Year | Tatars (Note: later known as Azerbaijanis) | | Armenians | | Others | | TOTAL |
| Uezd | Year | Number | % | Number | % | Number | % | TOTAL |
|---|---|---|---|---|---|---|---|---|
| Jevanshir | 1897 | 52,041 | 71.56 | 19,551 | 26.89 | 1,127 | 1.55 | 72,719 |
| Jevanshir | 1916 | 50,798 | 67.08 | 22,008 | 29.06 | 2,924 | 3.86 | 75,730 |
| Zangezur | 1897 | 71,206 | 51.65 | 63,622 | 46.15 | 3,043 | 2.21 | 137,871 |
| Zangezur | 1916 | 119,705 | 52.87 | 101,055 | 44.64 | 5,638 | 2.49 | 226,398 |
| Jebrail | 1897 | 49,189 | 74.12 | 15,746 | 23.73 | 1,425 | 2.15 | 66,360 |
| Jebrail | 1916 | 65,587 | 73.21 | 21,755 | 24.28 | 2,242 | 2.50 | 89,584 |
| Shusha | 1897 | 62,868 | 45.30 | 73,953 | 53.29 | 1,950 | 1.41 | 138,771 |
| Shusha | 1916 | 85,622 | 45.36 | 98,809 | 52.35 | 4,314 | 2.29 | 188,745 |
| TOTAL | 1897 | 235,304 | 56.60 | 172,872 | 41.58 | 7,545 | 1.81 | 415,721 |
| TOTAL | 1916 | 321,712 | 55.42 | 243,627 | 41.97 | 15,118 | 2.60 | 580,457 |

== Toponyms ==
The historian Arsène Saparov explains that due to Karabakh's location as a peripheral borderland within the region in relation to local historical empires, as well as the specific economic relations between its peoples, "an extremely complex palimpsest-type toponymic landscape in Karabakh" was formed. There are four main toponymic layers in Karabakh; Turkic, Armenian, Iranian and Russian. In addition, there are a large number of mixed toponyms which contain elements from more than one language. Lastly, there has been a complexity of simultaneous existence of two overlapping toponymic landscapes belonging to different languages. These two toponymic systems overlap, as Saparov explains, in space and time, and cover the same territory, but are used concurrently by two groups. One toponymic landscape was used by the sedentary Armenians of Karabakh, whereas the Turkic (later known as Azerbaijanis) and Kurdish nomads of the area used the other toponymic system for the same territory.

Iranian toponyms are attested in places such as Chldran, Charektar, Khojavend and Hadrut. Saparov explains that the oldest Russian toponyms in Karabakh date to the 19th century, assigned to hamlets that were originally settlements of Russian colonists or Cossack outposts on the border with Iran. Some examples are Kuropatkino, Sunzhinka, Lisagorskoe, Skobolevka, and Kotliarovka. Turkic toponyms include Dashbulag, Agbulag, Karabulag and Chailu. Armenian toponyms include Tkhkot, Mokhratakh, Vank and Kolatak. Mixed toponyms include Mamedazor (Islamic first name Mamed combined with the Armenian term for "gorge"), or Meshadishen (combining the Turkic first name Meshadi with the Armenian term shen, i.e. village), and Sardarashen (combination of the Persian word sardar and the Armenian term for village, shen).

Some place names derive from the names of historic figures, including local lords. Most of these lords were Armenian or Turkic in origin. However, as the Armenian notables of Karabakh often borrowed their personal names from their immediate Muslim overlords, these anthroponyms such as Kherkhan, Farukh and Seiti are usually, as Saparov narrates (citing Gaziyan and Mkrtchyan), assigned "to the Turkic toponymic landscape".

=== Overlapping Armenian and Turkic toponymic landscape ===
Due to Karabakh's specific economic conditions, with its lowland nomads crossing into the mountains during summer across agricultural settlements, two overlapping toponymic landscapes were created over time; Armenian and Turkic. Until the arrival of the Russian Empire, these two toponymic landscapes were used concurrently by the Armenian group on one hand and the nomads consisting of Turkics (later known as Azerbaijanis) and Kurds on the other. An example in this regard is the place of Karintak in Armenian, known in Turkic as Dashalty (both versions translate as "village under the rock"). There are also place names from one language that were linguistically altered by another. For example, the place of Vank, became known in Turkic as Vanklu (by adding the Turkic suffix "-lu"), and the town of Shosh (Armenian) became known in Turkic as Shushikend (by adding the Turkic suffix, -kend, i.e. "village"). Other place names are toponymically unrelated in relation to their respective substitution, such as the town known as Susalykh (in Turkic) with its Armenian equivalent Mokhranes.

=== Tsarist changes ===
The two toponymic systems coexisted and served both groups until the arrival of the Russian Empire. The Russians introduced the administrative system of a centralized European Empire, which brought about a standardization of the bureaucracy. Therefore, toponyms started to be recorded in Russian gazetteers and maps in the second half of the 19th century. As two toponymic systems were deemed impractical, only one toponymic landscape was recorded by the Tsarist officials, even though the double toponymic landscape remained visible in maps and gazetteers due to the occasional printing of double names. The Tsarist officials preferred the Turkic toponyms over the Armenian ones, as they, in the words of Saparov (citing the historian George Bournoutian), likely relied on the existing Persian tax records kept by the administration of the Karabakh Khanate.

=== Soviet changes ===
During the existence of the Soviet Union, toponyms that were deemed ideologically unacceptable to the Soviet doctrine and leadership, such as those that showed social, monarchic, or religious affiliations, were changed en masse as in the rest of the Soviet realm. Specifically, in relation to Karabakh, these include names that bore names of local lords, religious holidays or personalities. The Soviets replaced such toponyms with commemorative names from the pantheon of Soviet leaders and figures, often locals of the area in question. For instance, Stepanakert, named after Armenian Bolshevik leader Stepan Shaumian, replaced the local Armenian (Vararakn) and Turkic (Khankendi) names as the town's sole official name. The town of Kolkhozashen reflected the Soviet practise of creating collective farm villages, i.e., a kolkhoz in Russian. Under the Soviets, a partial reversal of Tsarist policies took place, and Armenian place names therefore reappeared on official Soviet maps. Simultaneously, Turkic place names that violated Bolshevik doctrines (e.g. settlements named after lords, landowners or religious names), were removed. By the early 1920s, the Armenian leaders of the newly established Nagorno-Karabakh Autonomous Oblast had succeeded in – although partially – restoring the Armenian toponymic landscape, bringing it to status of legitimacy, and replacing the previously dominant Turkic one that had become favoured under the Russian Empire. This situation remained in place, Saparov narrates, "largely unaffected until the end of the Soviet era".

=== Nagorno-Karabakh conflict changes ===
During the ongoing Nagorno-Karabakh conflict, both Armenia and Azerbaijan have changed the names of numerous settlements in Karabakh order to support the legitimacy of their respective territorial claims. Azerbaijani authorities have targeted historical Armenian place names in Karabakh, whereas the Armenians have removed Turkic place names. Both sides use the place names that were historically used within the two toponymic landscapes that co-existed before the arrival of the Russians during the Russo-Persian Wars.

Most renamings by the Azerbaijani government occurred during the First Nagorno-Karabakh War, as a way to, as Saparov explains "to reinstate the symbolic authority of Azerbaijan over this disputed secessionist territory and as a result targeted what they perceived as Armenian place-names". Out of 208 toponyms recorded by the Azerbaijani authorities in the territory of Karabakh, 81 were renamed and 127 remained unchanged. The main goal was to remove toponyms that could, in any way, support the territorial claims of the Armenians. Following the Second Nagorno-Karabakh War, the Azerbaijani government successfully petitioned Google to remove Armenian place names from maps of Karabakh.

The Armenian side has also initiated a renaming campaign, targeting Turkic place names. According to 2009 data from the de facto Republic of Artsakh, of a total of 151 place names, 54 were renamed and 97 remained unchanged. The difference in place names between the Armenian and Azerbaijani sides is because the Armenians used less detailed maps than the Soviet and Azerbaijani maps and also excluded a number of smaller settlements. Furthermore, the 2009 data also omits a number of Azerbaijani settlements that were destroyed during the First Nagorno-Karabakh War and were never rebuilt afterwards.

According to Saparov, both sides followed the same logic of "imposing a symbolic toponymic landscape that belonged to one of the ethnic groups on the disputed territory, in the process destroying the ‘enemy’ toponyms and thus denying any legitimacy to the opponent's territorial claim".

== Karabakh dialect ==
The Armenian population of the region speaks the Karabakh dialect of Armenian which has been heavily influenced by the Persian, Russian, and Turkish languages. It was the most extensively spoken of all Armenian dialects until the Soviet period when the dialect of Yerevan became the official tongue of the Armenian SSR.

== Flora ==
The Khari-bulbul (Ophrys caucasica) is a flowering plant that is considered by some to be "official flower" of the Karabakh region. Its flower shape has been interpreted as being similar to a bulbul.

Populations of Tulipa armena found in the Karabakh mountain range have been called T. karabachensis.

== See also ==
- Gharabaghi (surname)
