= Karabakh Revival Fund =

Azerbaijani restoration foundation

The Karabakh Revival Fund (Azerbaijani: Qarabağ Dirçəliş Fondu) , established by the Decree of the President of the Republic of Azerbaijan Ilham Aliyev dated January 4, 2021, is a public legal entity that provides financial support and attracts investments to measures taken to restore and reconstruct the liberated territories of the Republic of Azerbaijan, as well as transform these territories into a region with a sustainable economy and high prosperity. It also develops public-private partnerships in this area and carries out the informational, awareness-raising, and promotional activities within and outside the country regarding the work being undertaken.

== History ==
The Second Karabakh War, which lasted from 27 September to 10 November 2020, ended with the victory of Azerbaijan. As a result, the Azerbaijani people liberated their territories from Armenian occupation through a great victory. The restoration of the country's territorial integrity was remembered as a demonstration of the supremacy of international law and national and moral values. The material and cultural assets of the territories that had been occupied for nearly 30 years were looted and destroyed by Armenian occupiers. The restoration and reintegration of the liberated territories is described as one of the main tasks facing the Azerbaijani state. For this purpose, the Karabakh Revival Fund public legal entity was established pursuant to a decree issued by President of the Republic of Azerbaijan Ilham Aliyev on 4 January 2021.

== Purpose ==
The main purpose of establishing the Karabakh Revival Fund as a public legal entity is to provide financial support and attract investment for measures aimed at the restoration and reconstruction of the liberated territories of the Republic of Azerbaijan, as well as their transformation into a region with a sustainable economy and high prosperity. The Fund is also intended to facilitate the development of public-private partnerships in this field and to carry out necessary promotional activities both within the country and abroad.

Another principal objective is to ensure modern and dignified living conditions for sustainable settlement in the liberated territories; carry out reconstruction, restoration, and improvement works in all areas; and support safe living, effective activity, and the sustainable growth of prosperity.

== Structure ==
=== Financing ===
The Fund's financial resources are formed from the following sources:

- donations from individuals and legal entities;
- grants;
- other sources not prohibited by law.

=== Leadership ===
According to the Presidential Decree, a Supervisory Board was established to exercise general management and oversight over the activities of the Karabakh Revival Fund. The current management of the Fund's activities is carried out by an Executive Board consisting of three members — a chairman and two deputies. The powers of the founder of the Fund are exercised by the President of the Republic of Azerbaijan. The powers of the President also include approving the Fund's charter and determining the amount of its charter capital, making amendments to them, approving its structure, establishing its governing bodies, appointing and dismissing members of the Supervisory Board, the Chairman of the Executive Board and the Chairman's two Deputies, as well as matters concerning liquidation and reorganization.

The composition of the Supervisory Board of the Karabakh Revival Fund was approved by Ilham Aliyev, pursuant to Article 109, Clause 32 of the Constitution of the Republic of Azerbaijan:

- Mikayil Jabbarov, Minister of Economy of the Republic of Azerbaijan (Chairman)
- Mukhtar Babayev, The Representative of the President of the Republic of Azerbaijan on Climate Issues
- Rovshan Rzayev, The Chairman of the State Committee for Affairs of Refugees and IDPs of the Republic of Azerbaijan
- Tural Ganjaliyev, Member of the Milli Majlis (National Parliament) of the Republic of Azerbaijan
- Fatma Yildirim, Member of the Milli Majlis (National Parliament) of the Republic of Azerbaijan
- Farhad Badalbeyli, Rector of the Baku Music Academy
- Adalat Muradov, Rector of Azerbaijan State University of Economics (UNEC)
- Kamal Abdullah, Rector of Azerbaijan University of Languages
- Alim Gasimov, People's Artist of the Republic of Azerbaijan.

=== Executive Board ===
In 2021, by an order of the President of the Republic of Azerbaijan Ilham Aliyev, Rahman Hajiyev was appointed Chairman of the Executive Board of the Fund.
