= Elman Mammadov =

Azerbaijani politician (born 1950)

Elman Mammadov Elman Məmmədov

Member of National Assembly of Azerbaijan for 124th Shusha-Fuzuli-Khojali-Khojavend district
- In office November 6, 2005 – November 7, 2010
- Preceded by: unknown
- Succeeded by: re-elected
- Incumbent
- Assumed office November 7, 2010

Mayor of Khojaly
- In office 1991–2000

Personal details
- Born: October 18, 1950 (age 75) Khojaly, Azerbaijan

Elman Mammadov (Azerbaijani: Elman Məmmədov; born October 18, 1950) is an Azerbaijani politician who serves as the Member of National Assembly of Azerbaijan from 124th Shusha-Fizuli-Khojali-Khojavend district. He's a veteran of the First Nagorno-Karabakh War.

== Early life ==
Mammadov was born on October 18, 1950, in Khojaly, Azerbaijan. He graduated from the Mathematics Department of Azerbaijan State Pedagogical University and Academy of Public Administration. Since 1973, he worked as a teacher, assistant director and director at a school in Khojaly. In 1985–1987, he was the head of party organization at dairy sovkhoz. In 1987–1991, he was the chairman of Khojaly Executive Committee. In 1991–2000, he was the Mayor of Khojaly, in exile since February 26, 1992. Elman Mammadov was also responsible for the self-defense detachments in Khojaly and was one of the survivors of Khojaly Massacre, who along with Commandant of Khojaly Airport Alif Hajiyev led one of the crowds of escaping Azerbaijani civilians out of Khojaly and came under Armenian fire. The civilian population was not fully evacuated, despite Mammadov's insistent demands. Thirty members of Mammadov's family were killed during the massacre. His account of what had happened in Khojaly were filmed by journalist Chingiz Mustafayev.

== Political career ==
Mammadov was elected to the National Assembly of Azerbaijan from the 124th Shusha-Fizuli-Khojali-Khojavend electoral district during 2005 parliamentary elections. In 2006, Mammadov along with Nizami Bahmanov and Havva Mammadova formally founded the Azerbaijani Community of Nagorno-Karabakh Social Union in exile, representing the Azerbaijani community of Nagorno-Karabakh in negotiation talks. Since its inception, he's also served as its Deputy Chairman.

He was re-elected from the same district during 2010 elections with 53.30% of votes. Mammadov is the member of the Committee on Security and Defense Issues of the National Assembly of Azerbaijan. He's one of the authors of a new military doctrine to be proposed and ratified in Azerbaijani parliament. He's also a member of Azerbaijan-Belarus, Azerbaijan-Bulgaria, Azerbaijan-France, Azerbaijan-Switzerland, Azerbaijan-Luxembourg inter-parliamentary groups and member of the Azerbaijani delegation to GUAM Parliamentary Assembly. Mammadov is a member of New Azerbaijan Party.

He has also recently urged Turkey to get rid of all Armenians on its territory, further adding that Turkey and Azerbaijan could together wipe Armenia off the face of the earth.

== Awards ==
Mammadov has been awarded with Azerbaijani Flag Order for his courage during the war. He is fluent in Russian and Armenian. He's married and has seven children.

== See also ==
- Azerbaijani Community of Nagorno-Karabakh
- Nizami Bahmanov
- Havva Mammadova
- Bayram Safarov
