= Havva Mammadova =

Azerbaijani politician (born 1958)

Havva Mammadova Həvva Məmmədova

Member of National Assembly of Azerbaijan for 122nd Khankendi district
- In office November 6, 2005 – November 7, 2010
- President: Ilham Aliyev
- Preceded by: unknown
- Succeeded by: Flora Gasimova

Personal details
- Born: 1958 (age 67–68) Barda, Azerbaijan

Havva Mammadova (Azerbaijani: Həvva Məmmədova; born 1958) is an Azerbaijani historian, professor, and politician who served as the Member of National Assembly of Azerbaijan from the 122nd Khankendi electoral district.

== Biography ==
Mammadova was born in 1958 in Barda, Azerbaijan. She graduated from Khankendi Pedagogical University in 1980 and Academy of Public Administration in 1992. Mammadova has a PhD in History. In 1980-1990, she worked as a teacher at a secondary school in Stepanakert. When Azerbaijani community of Khankendi was expelled from the city, Mammadova became the internally displaced person within Azerbaijan. Since 1993, she has taught history at the Academy of Public Administration in Baku. In 2001, she defended a dissertation on the topic “The Fight Against Armenian Separatism in the Nagorno-Karabakh Region during the Azerbaijan Democratic Republic” and received the degree of Candidate of Historical Sciences. In 2011, she defended a dissertation on the topic “The Armenian-Azerbaijani Nagorno-Karabakh Conflict in the Foreign Policy of the Republic of Azerbaijan” and received the academic degree of Doctor of Historical Sciences.

== Political career ==
Mammadova was elected to the National Assembly of Azerbaijan from the 122nd Khankendi electoral district during 2005 parliamentary elections. She did not run for re-election in 2010 elections for unknown reasons. Flora Gasimova replaced Havva Mammadova after receiving 55.1% of votes in 2010 elections.

As a native of Karabakh, Mammadova has done a lot of work with Azerbaijani refugees and IDPs. She had traveled to Georgia, United States, Europe to attend events related to Karabakh and meet with Azerbaijani diaspora. In 2006, Mammadova along with Nizami Bahmanov and Elman Mammadov formally founded the Azerbaijani Community of Nagorno-Karabakh Social Union in exile, representing the Azerbaijani community of Nagorno-Karabakh in negotiation talks. She's an author of three books on Nagorno-Karabakh conflict, including Khojaly: martyrs and princes: Armenian terrorism as an integral part of international terrorism

Mammadova is a member of Women Refugees Network. She is also the Baku representative of the newspaper New Europe.

== Selected works ==
- Khodjaly : Martyrs and witnesses : Armenian terrorism as an integral part of the international one , 2005
- Azärbaycan xalq cümhuriyyäti dövründä Yuxarı Qarabağda siyasi väziyyät : Ermäni terrorizminin güclänmäsi (1918-1920), 2006
- The Khodjaly genocide, 2009

== See also ==
- Cabinet of Azerbaijan
- Azerbaijani Community of Nagorno-Karabakh
- Women in Azerbaijan
- Nizami Bahmanov
