= Church of St. Nerses the Great =

Church in Martuni, Azerbaijan

- Սուրբ Ներսես Մեծ եկեղեցի Surb Nerses Mets Yekeghetsi
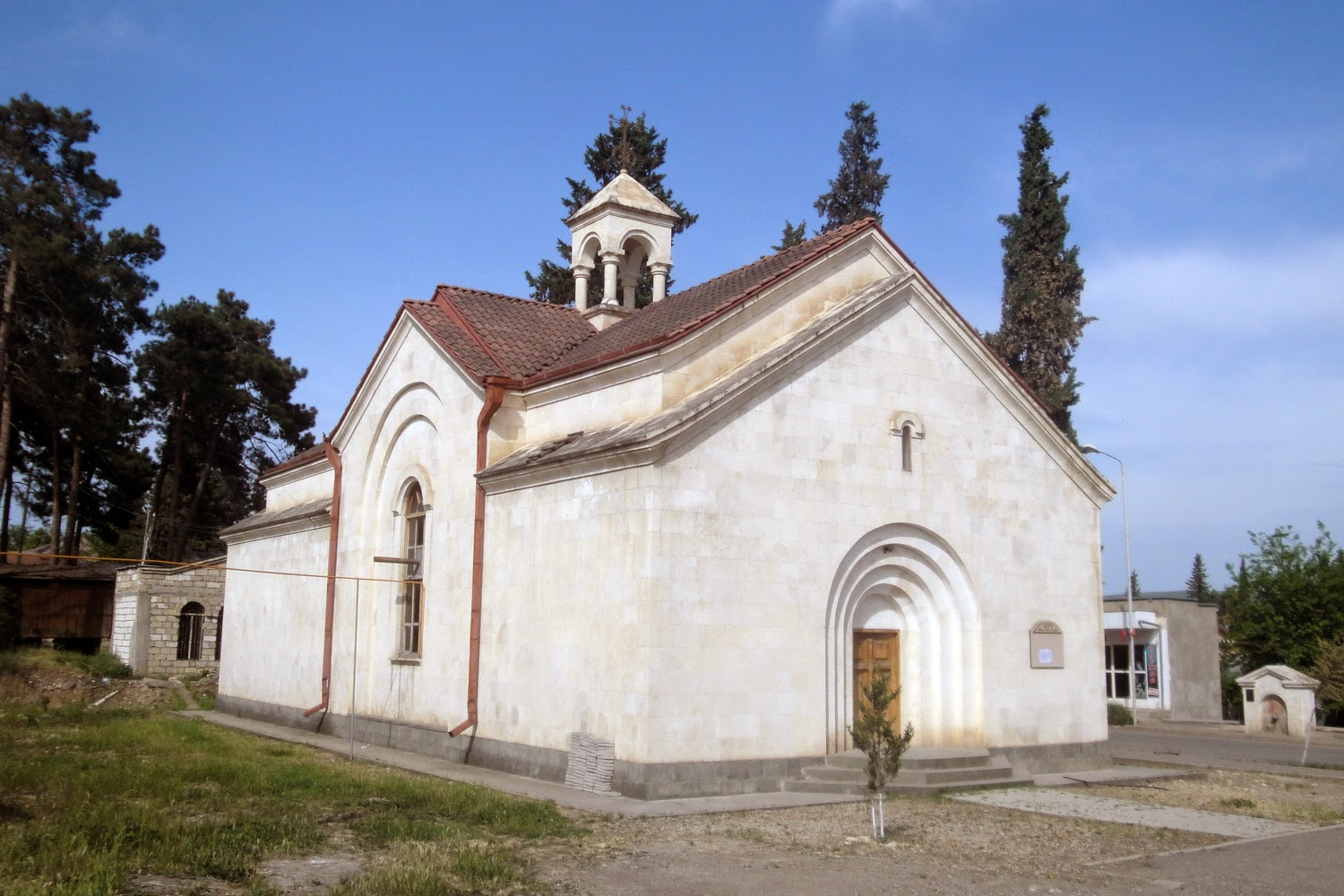

- Location within Azerbaijan Location within Karabakh Economic Region

Religion
- Affiliation: Armenian Apostolic Church
- Rite: Armenian
- Status: Closed in 2023

Location
- Location: Martuni, Nagorno-Karabakh, Azerbaijan
- Coordinates: 39.7919°N 47.1127°E

Architecture
- Type: Church
- Style: Armenian
- Completed: 2004

Church of St. Nerses the Great (Armenian: Սուրբ Ներսես Մեծ եկեղեցի, romanized: Surb Nerses Mets Yekeghetsi), is an Armenian Apostolic church in the town of Martuni, Nagorno-Karabakh, Azerbaijan. The church was consecrated in 2004 with construction funded by philanthropist Alice Ohanian. It is dedicated to the famous Armenian Catholicos, St. Nerses the Great. According to Monument Watch, in the two years following the capture of Martuni by Azerbaijan, the church has sustained damage.

== Gallery ==
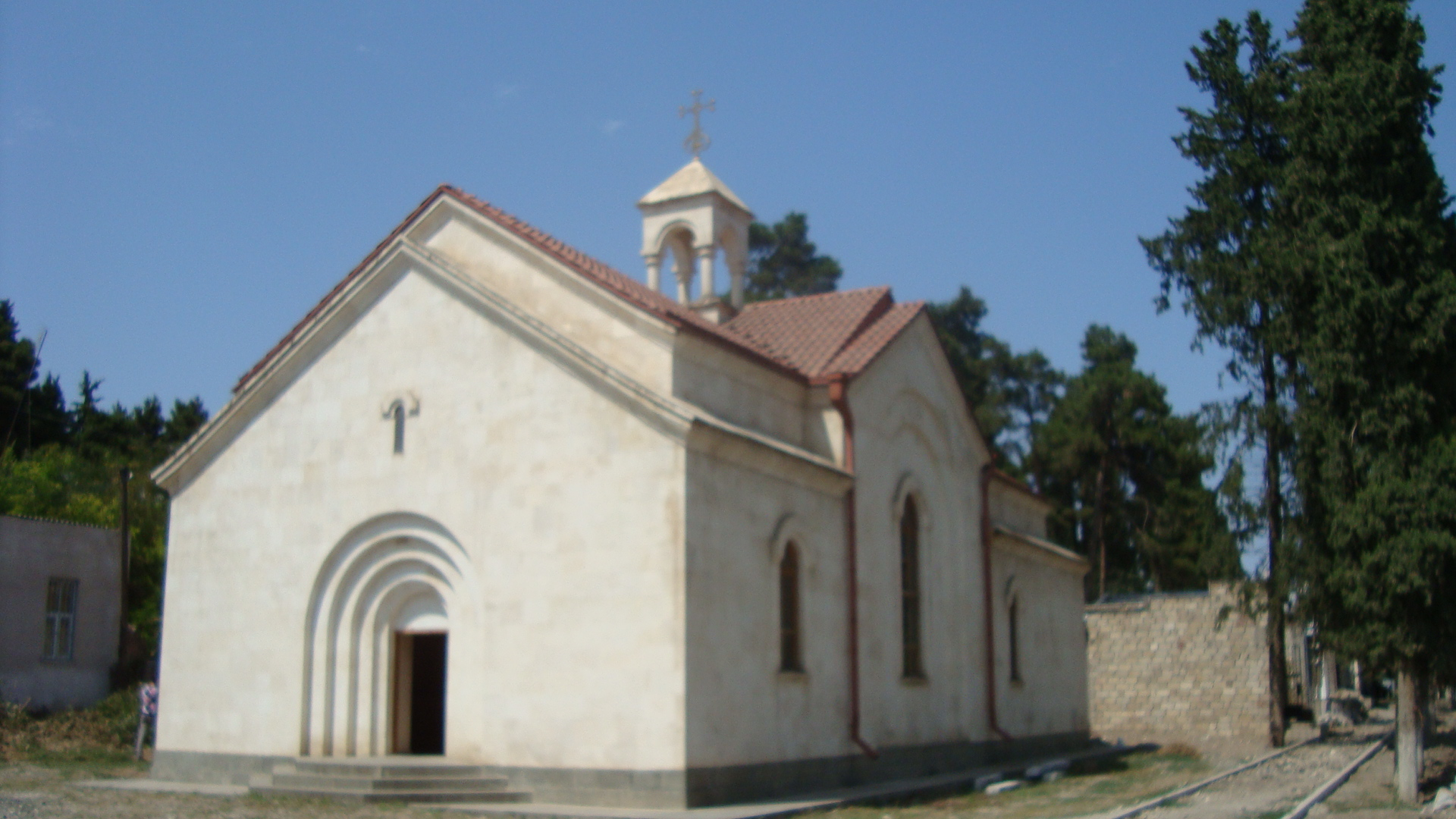

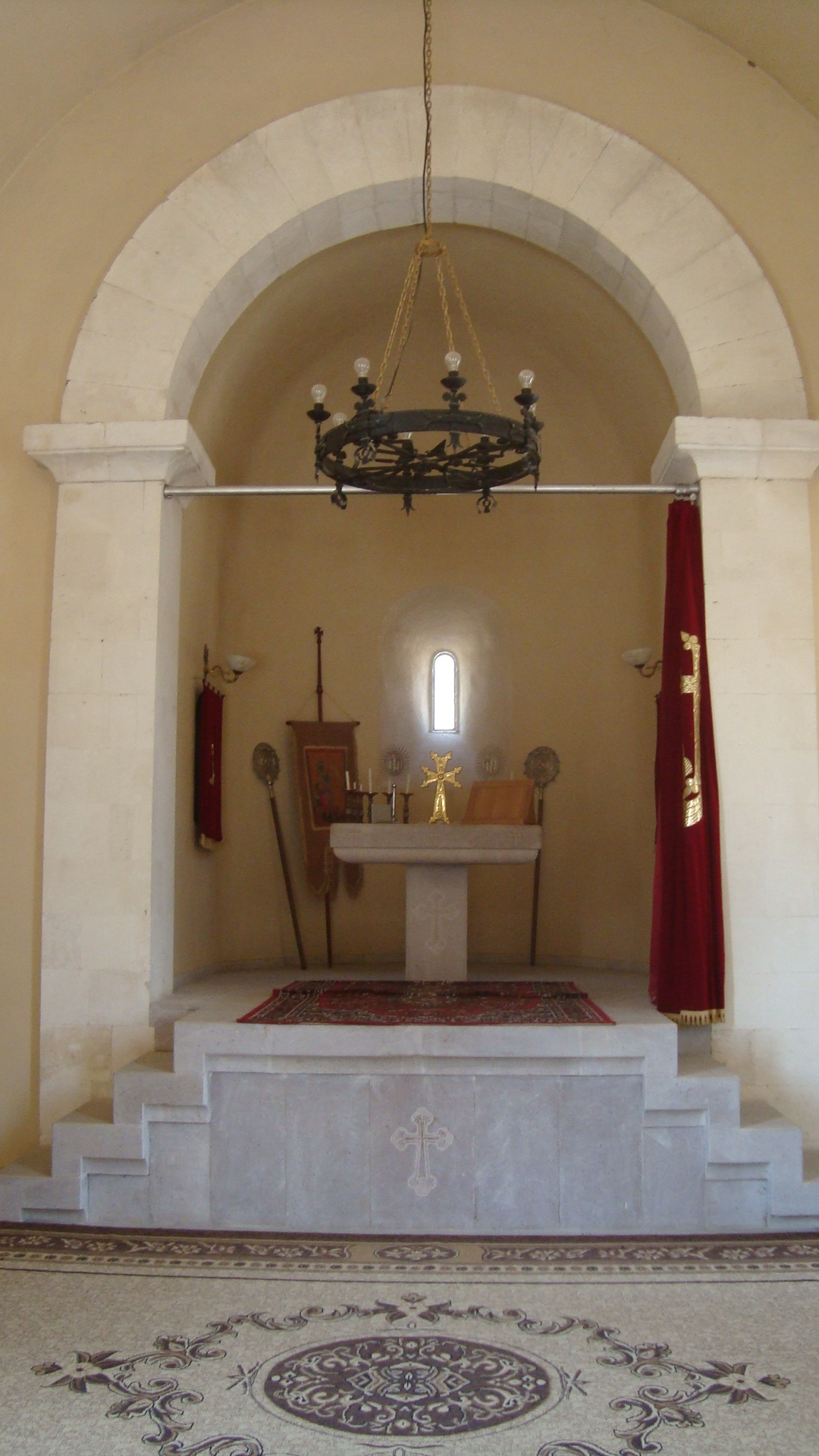

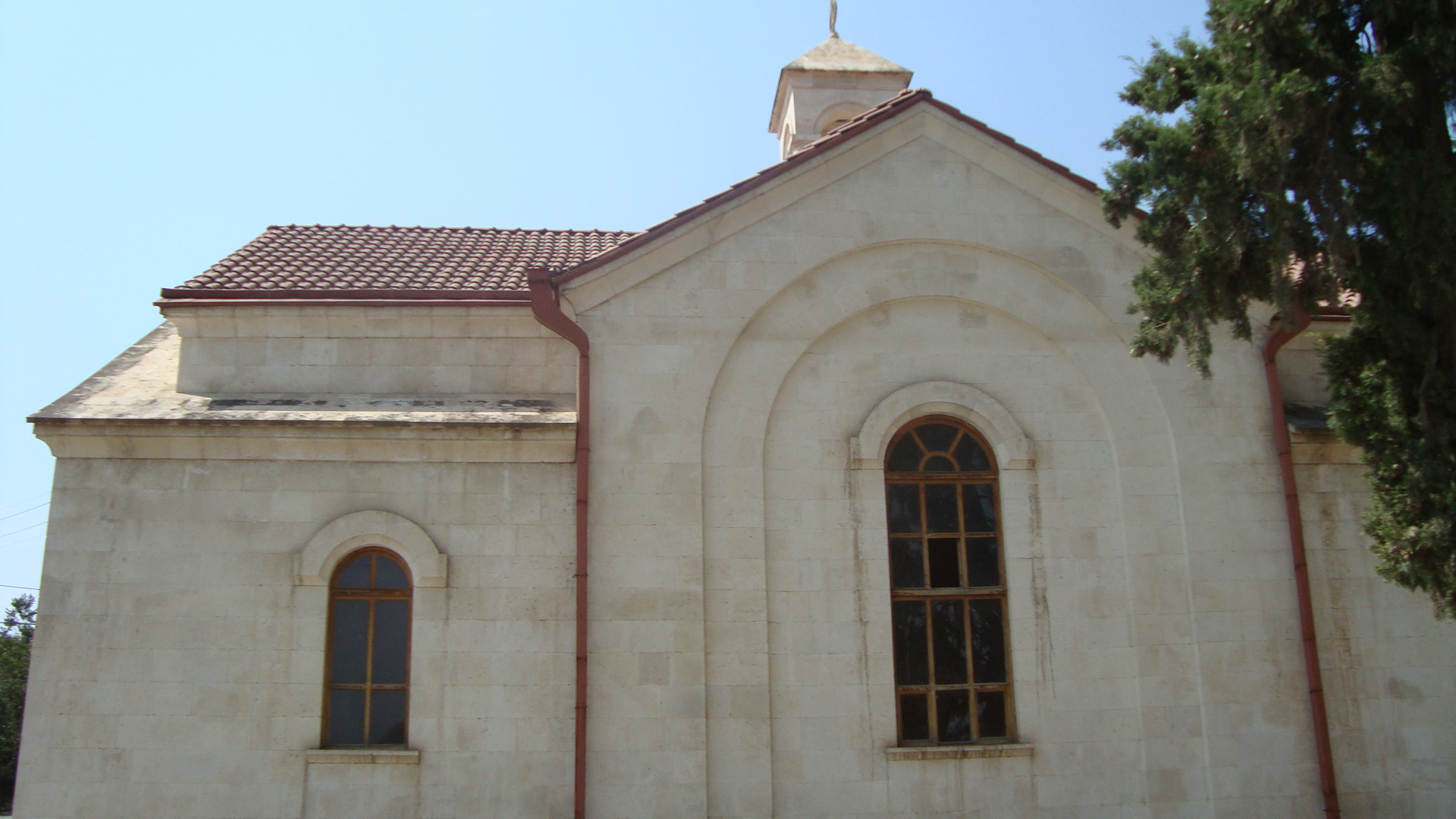

== See also ==
- Armenia–Azerbaijan relations
- Christianity in Azerbaijan
