= Non-governmental organisations in Azerbaijan =

Non-governmental organizations (NGOs) in Azerbaijan are severely curtailed by the authoritarian regime in Azerbaijan. In 2013–2014, Ilham Aliyev's regime copied Russian laws that cracked down on the freedom of operation for NGOs. The Aliyev regime frequently justifies its crackdown on civil society by asserting that they are agents of foreign entities. The regime has imprisoned some NGO leaders.

== List of NGO in Azerbaijan ==
Name	Formation	Official Website
Azerbaijani Community of Nagorno-Karabakh	March 24, 1992	
International Dialogue for Environmental Action	July 12, 2011	
Turkish-Azerbaijan Women’s Association		
Azerbaijan Student Youth Organizations' Union		
