= Gharabaghi =

Gharabaghi or Qarabaghi (Persian: قره‌باقی; lit. "from Karabakh") is a common surname in Iran, and to a lesser extent in Azerbaijan.

== People ==
- Abbas Gharabaghi (1918 - 2000), last chief of staff of the Iranian armed forces as well as deputy commander-in-chief of the Iranian Imperial Army during the rule of the Pahlavi dynasty.
- Parviz Fattah Gharabaghi (born 1961) Iranian politician, former member of Revolutionary Guard and former minister of energy in Mahmoud Ahmadinejad's first cabinet from 2005 to 2009.
