= Nizami Bahmanov =

Azerbaijani politician

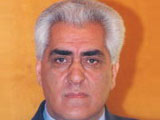
- Bahmanov in 2005

Leader of Azerbaijani Community of Nagorno-Karabakh in Exile
- In office March 24, 1992 – September 13, 2008
- President: Abulfaz Elchibey, Heydar Aliyev, Ilham Aliyev
- Succeeded by: Bayram Safarov

Head of Executive Power of Shusha
- In office April 8, 1992 (in exile from May 8, 1992) – September 13, 2008
- President: Abulfaz Elchibey, Heydar Aliyev, Ilham Aliyev
- Succeeded by: Bayram Safarov

Personal details
- Born: April 4, 1948 Shusha, Azerbaijan
- Died: September 13, 2008 (aged 60) Baku, Azerbaijan

Nizami Bahmanov (Azerbaijani: Nizami Keykavus oğlu Bəhmənov; April 4, 1948 – September 13, 2008) was an Azerbaijani politician who served as the Head of the Executive Power of Shusha and the Chairman of the Azerbaijani Community of Nagorno-Karabakh in Exile.

== Early life ==
Bahmanov was born on April 4, 1948, in Shusha, Azerbaijan to Keykavus Bahmanov (1908–1981) and Sajara Ismailova. He is great-grandson of Bahman Mirza Qajar through his 15th son, Keygubad Mirza (1865–1923). He graduated from Azerbaijan Technical University in Baku. He worked many years in construction and was the executive officer of a renovation and construction union until April 1992.

== Political career ==
On March 24, 1992, he was recognized as an interested party from the Azerbaijani side of Karabakh by the Organization for Security and Co-operation in Europe (OSCE). On April 8, 1992, Bahmanov was appointed the Head of Executive Power of Shusha. Since Shusha was the city with majority Azerbaijani population, its executive officer was chosen to represent the whole Azerbaijani community of Karabakh. He subsequently represented the Azerbaijani community of Nagorno-Karabakh region in peace talks held by OSCE Minsk Group. The status of the Azerbaijani Community of Nagorno-Karabakh Social Union, co-founded by Nizami Bahmanov, member of Azerbaijani Parliament, Havva Mammadova and Elman Mammadov, was formally confirmed by the Ministry of Justice of Azerbaijan in September 2006. He was also a member of State Commission on POWs, Missing and Citizens taken hostage. As the leader of Azerbaijani community of Karabakh, he believed public diplomacy between Azerbaijan and Armenia would not yield any substantial results and that only after the return of Azerbaijani community to their homes in Karabakh would resolve its final status.

== Death ==
Bahmanov died on September 13, 2008, in his office while holding a meeting. The office of the leader of Azerbaijani Community of Nagorno-Karabakh remained unoccupied until February 27, 2009, when Bayram Safarov was appointed the Head of Executive Power of Shusha, subsequently filling the office of leader of Azerbaijani Community of Nagorno-Karabakh too.

In March 2008, Bahmanov had been awarded with Shohrat Order.
