= Shirin Mirzayev =

National Hero of Azerbaijan

- Born: 5 January 1947; Stepanakert, Azerbaijan SSR, USSR
- Died: 18 June 1992 (aged 45); Aghdam, Azerbaijan
- Military career
- Service years: 1991–1992
- Conflicts: First Nagorno-Karabakh War
- Awards: National Hero of Azerbaijan; 1994

Shirin Mirzayev (Azerbaijani: Şirin Vəli oğlu Mirzəyev) (5 January 1947, in Khankendi, Azerbaijan SSR, USSR – 18 June 1992, in Aghdam, Azerbaijan) was a National Hero of Azerbaijan, lieutenant colonel and the warrior of the First Nagorno-Karabakh War.

== Life ==
Mirzayev was born on January 5, 1947, in Khankendi. He served in the regiment of internal troops in Baku. After graduating from the Leningrad Higher Military-Political School of the USSR Ministry of Internal Affairs in 1971, he was sent to Yerevan for further service. Five years later he was transferred to Baku. During the 15-year service in the regiment of internal troops, he graduated from the Lenin Military-Political Academy named after V. I. Lenin.

=== Karabakh war ===
In 1991, Shirin Mirzayev arrived to serve in Agdam, at that time one of the most "hot spots" in Azerbaijan. He held the positions of deputy team commander, deputy battalion commander, deputy division commander, and on October 9, 1991, he was appointed battalion commander in the Khojaly region. In early June 1992, the Azerbaijani command developed a plan for a large-scale offensive, during which the troops were to deliver a simultaneous strike against the enemy from three sides. Despite the lack of military equipment, weapons and ammunition, the battalion commander Mirzaev organized the successful advance of his unit along the Khachynchay River, occupying the villages of Kazanchi, Syrkhavend, Farukh, Pirjamal, Balligaya, Garashlar, Bashirli, Agbulak, Dargaz, Nakhichevanik in the Agdam region.

On June 18, 1992, Lieutenant Colonel Shirin Mirzayev, while returning to his unit from a business trip to Baku, was blown up by a mine laid on the road to the village of Garalar. He was buried in the Alley of Martyrs.

== Family ==
His wife Flora Gasimova is a member of the National Assembly of Azerbaijan. They got married in 1976. They have two children: one son and one daughter.

== Memorial ==
By the decree of the President of the Republic of Azerbaijan dated September 16, 1994, Mirzayev Shirin Veli oglu was awarded the title of National Hero of Azerbaijan (posthumously).

A street in the Nizami district of Baku is named after him. On the territory of the military unit where Shirin Mirzayev served, a monument to the hero was erected. In the Turkish city of Bursa there is a park in honor of Shirin Mirzayev.

== Awards ==
- (16.09.1994) — Gold Star Medal (Azerbaijan) (posthumously)

== See also ==
- List of National Heroes of Azerbaijan

== Sources ==
- Əsgərov, Vüqar (2005). Azərbaycanın Milli Qəhrəmanları (PDF). Baku: Qapp-poliqraf. p. 250.
