= Bayram Safarov =

Azerbaijani politician

- Bayram Səfərov

Mayor of Shusha
- Incumbent
- Assumed office 27 February 2009
- President: Ilham Aliyev
- Preceded by: Nizami Bahmanov

Leader of Azerbaijani Community of Nagorno-Karabakh
- In office 27 February 2009 – 30 April 2021
- President: Ilham Aliyev
- Preceded by: Nizami Bahmanov
- Succeeded by: Office abolished

Personal details
- Born: 1951 (age 74–75) Shusha, Azerbaijan SSR, USSR

Bayram Asad oghlu Safarov (Azerbaijani: Bayram Əsəd oğlu Səfərov; born 1951) is an Azerbaijani politician who has been serving as the Head of the Executive Power of Shusha since 2009.

== Early life ==
Bayram Safarov was born in 1951 in Shusha, Azerbaijan. He has worked as the chairman of the Shusha Rayon Consumption Society and Deputy Head of Executive Power of Shusha. In recent years he has worked in executive positions at Azerbaijan Airlines.

== Political career ==
On 27 February 2009 Safarov was appointed the Head of Executive Power of Shusha and subsequently elected the Chairman of Azerbaijani Community of Nagorno-Karabakh.

Safarov's stance on determination of Nagorno-Karabakh status is based on the requirement of having 65,000 Azerbaijani Community returned to their homes in Karabakh before any status is discussed.
