= Martuni, Nagorno-Karabakh =

Town in Nagorno-Karabakh, Azerbaijan

Martuni / Khojavend Մարտունի / Xocavənd
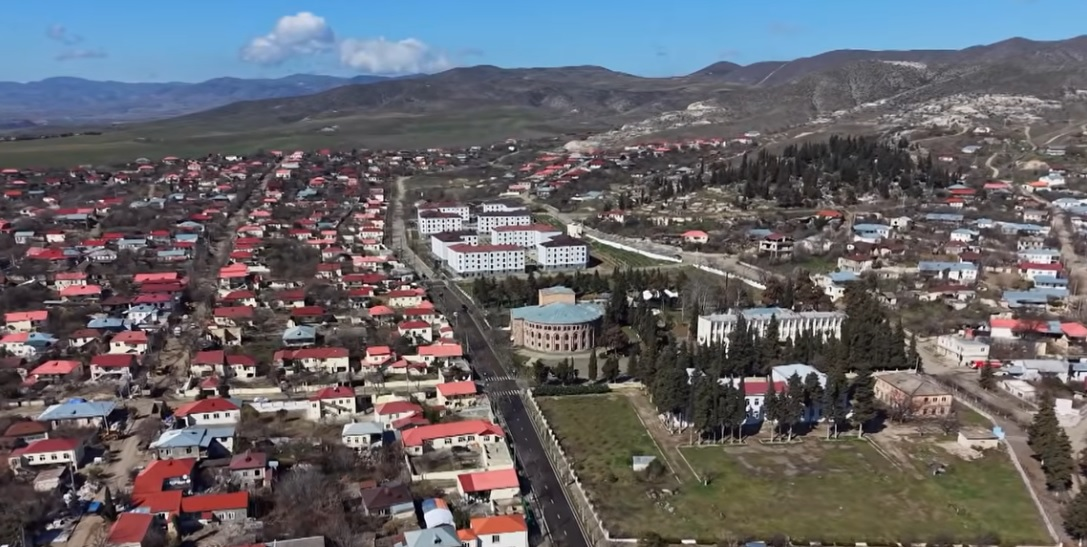

- Location within Azerbaijan Location within Karabakh Economic Region
- Coordinates: 39°47′43″N 47°06′47″E
- Country: Azerbaijan
- District: Khojavend
- Elevation: 390 m (1,280 ft)

Population (2015)
  - Total: 5,700
- Time zone: UTC+4 (AZT)
- Area code: (+374) 478

Martuni (Armenian: Մարտունի) or Khojavend (Azerbaijani: Xocavənd) is an Armenian town in the region of Nagorno-Karabakh, Azerbaijan. Until 2023 it was controlled by the breakaway Republic of Artsakh, as the centre of its Martuni Province, after the First Nagorno-Karabakh War. The village had an ethnic Armenian-majority population until the expulsion of the Armenian population of Nagorno-Karabakh by Azerbaijan following the 2023 Azerbaijani offensive in Nagorno-Karabakh.

== Etymology ==
The name Khojavend is of Persian origin. The name Martuni originates from the nom de guerre of Armenian Bolshevik revolutionary and official Alexander Miasnikian.

== History ==
Excavations in the settlement have uncovered a number of tombs dating to the Neolithic and Bronze Age. The town is also home to several ruined medieval churches and remains of settlements, and khachkars have also been preserved.

The town was founded in the medieval period by local Armenians as a village named Khonashen (Armenian: Խոնաշեն), where shen means village and khona, depending on the source, allows different interpretations (namely, “village, dwelling” or “reservoir, well, spring”). The old name of Khonashen originated from the nearby Khonashen river. Traditionally, the village belonged to the Melikdom of Varanda. In 1925, the settlement was transformed into a city and renamed Martuni.

During the Soviet period, Martuni was the capital of the Martuni District in the Nagorno-Karabakh Autonomous Oblast. The population of the town, grouped into kolkhozes, largely occupied itself with raising livestock, grape growing, wheat cultivation, and gardening.

=== Nagorno-Karabakh conflict ===
==== First Nagorno-Karabakh War ====
Martuni, and the district itself, became a frontline city during the latter stages of the First Nagorno-Karabakh War. In early February 1992, Vazgen Sargsyan, then Defence Minister of Armenia, appointed Monte Melkonian as Chief of Headquarters and assigned him to lead the defense of Martuni and the surrounding regions. On October 2, 1992, Armenian armed forces captured the region around Martuni. According to an Azerbaijani source, considerable damage was done to the infrastructure of 10 villages settled by Azerbaijanis in the region during the war. Melkonian remained as regional commander until he was killed in combat in June 1993.

==== 2020 Nagorno-Karabakh war ====
From the very first days of the 2020 Nagorno-Karabakh war (started on 27 September 2020), Martuni was subjected to artillery shelling by the armed forces of Azerbaijan. This led to the disconnection of the city from electricity and gas supply. On 1 November, Azerbaijani aviation launched an airstrike on the city. The Armenian detachments managed to hold their positions in Martuni until a ceasefire was established.

On 15 November 2020, a Russian peacekeeping contingent formed an observation post in the city. On 13 February 2021, the specialists of the International Mine Action Center of the Ministry of Defense of the Russian Federation completed the clearance of the territory in the Martuni region. On 1 March, a block-modular town was commissioned for the residence of military personnel of the Russian peacekeeping contingent.

==== 2023 Azerbaijani offensive in Nagorno-Karabakh ====
Following the 2023 Azerbaijani offensive in Nagorno-Karabakh, the town came under control of Azerbaijani forces on 26 September 2023. Azerbaijan's authorities reportedly dismantled a statue of Armenian militant Monte Melkonian.

== Historical and cultural heritage ==
The town has a house of culture commonly called "The Opera", and the Church of St. Nerses the Great, opened in 2004. The Russian 19th-century Gevorgavan Church is located near Martuni.

== Economy and culture ==
The population mainly works in agriculture and animal husbandry. In 2015, the town had a municipal building, a house of culture, two schools, a music school, two kindergartens, a youth centre, 36 commercial enterprises, two factories and a regional hospital. The town also includes the villages of Kajavan and Kakavadzor.

== Climate ==
Climate data for Martuni (Khojavend)
Month	Jan	Feb	Mar	Apr	May	Jun	Jul	Aug	Sep	Oct	Nov	Dec	Year
Mean daily maximum °C (°F)	5.5 (41.9)	6.4 (43.5)	10.1 (50.2)	17.5 (63.5)	21.7 (71.1)	26.6 (79.9)	29.8 (85.6)	29.7 (85.5)	24.8 (76.6)	19.1 (66.4)	12.6 (54.7)	8.0 (46.4)	17.7 (63.8)
Mean daily minimum °C (°F)	−1.7 (28.9)	−1.0 (30.2)	1.8 (35.2)	7.6 (45.7)	12.1 (53.8)	16.4 (61.5)	19.5 (67.1)	18.4 (65.1)	15.2 (59.4)	10.2 (50.4)	4.9 (40.8)	0.6 (33.1)	8.7 (47.6)
Average precipitation mm (inches)	20 (0.8)	26 (1.0)	36 (1.4)	49 (1.9)	68 (2.7)	55 (2.2)	23 (0.9)	23 (0.9)	28 (1.1)	44 (1.7)	31 (1.2)	25 (1.0)	428 (16.8)
Source: http://en.climate-data.org/location/21894/

== Demographics ==
According to the census of 1933, 1028 people lived in the village, divided into 120 households, all of whom were Armenians. The town had an ethnic Armenian-majority population, and also had an Armenian majority in 1989. It had a population of 5,700 as of 2015.

Historical ethnic composition of Martuni (town)
Ethnic group	1939		1970		1979		2005	
Ethnic group	Number	%	Number	%	Number	%	Number	%
Armenian	1,701	89.2	3,120	67.0	3,588	65.3	4,863	99.7
Azerbaijani	52	2.7	1,482	31.8	1,862	33.9	0	0.0
Russian	136	7.1	44	0.9	41	0.7	8	0.2
Ukrainian	7	0.4	3	0.1	1	0.0	1	0.0
Other	10	0.5	5	0.2	5	0.1	6	0.1
TOTAL	1,906	100.0	4,654	100.0	5,497	100.0	4,878	100.0

As of February 2026, 50 families, comprising 194 individuals, were resettled in Khojavand city, while 20 families, totaling 94 people, were relocated to Khojavand village by Azerbaijan.

As of September 2026, 1,083 families have returned to Khojavend.

== Twin cities ==
- Les Pennes-Mirabeau, France

== Gallery ==
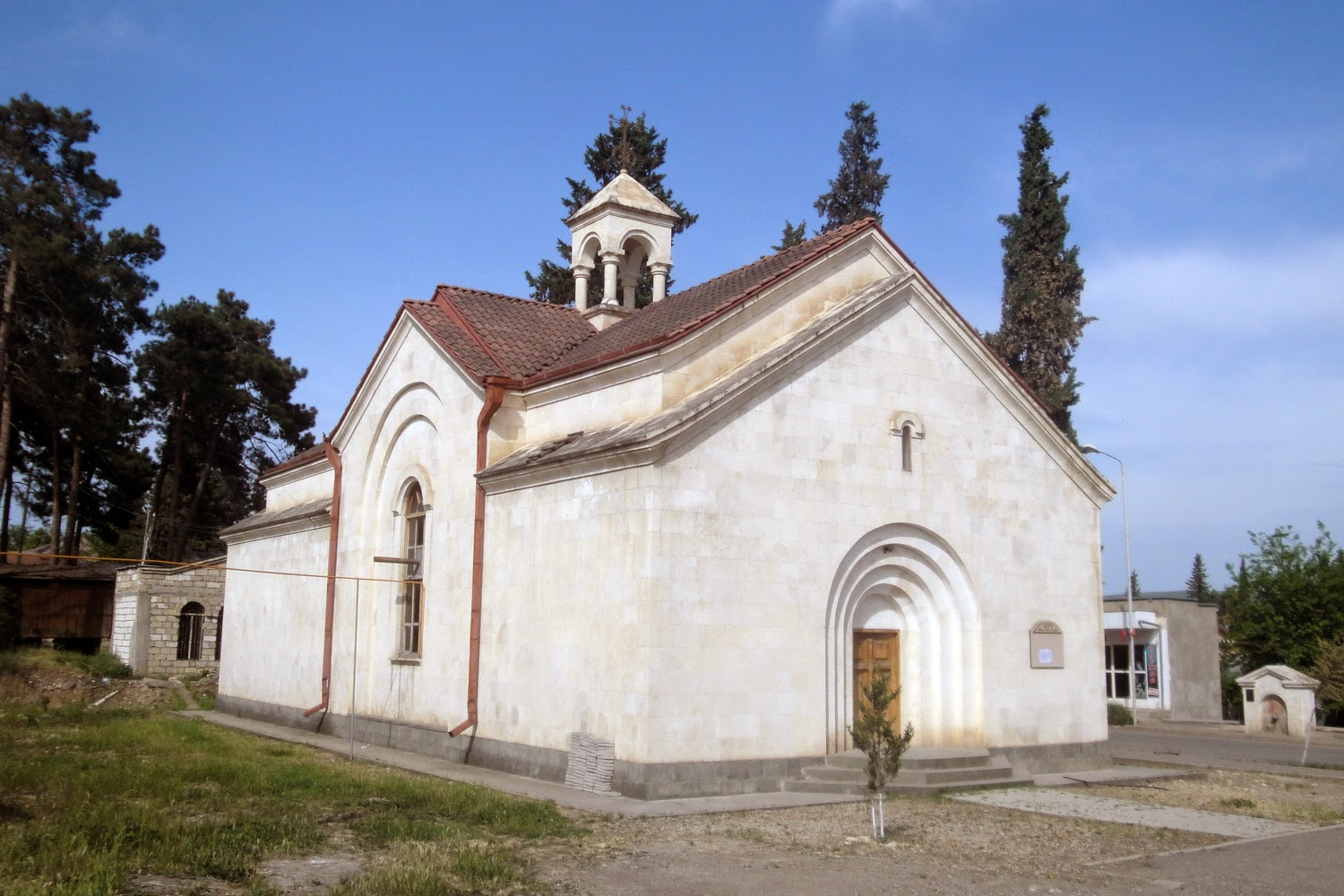
Church of St. Nerses the Great in Martuni, opened in 2004

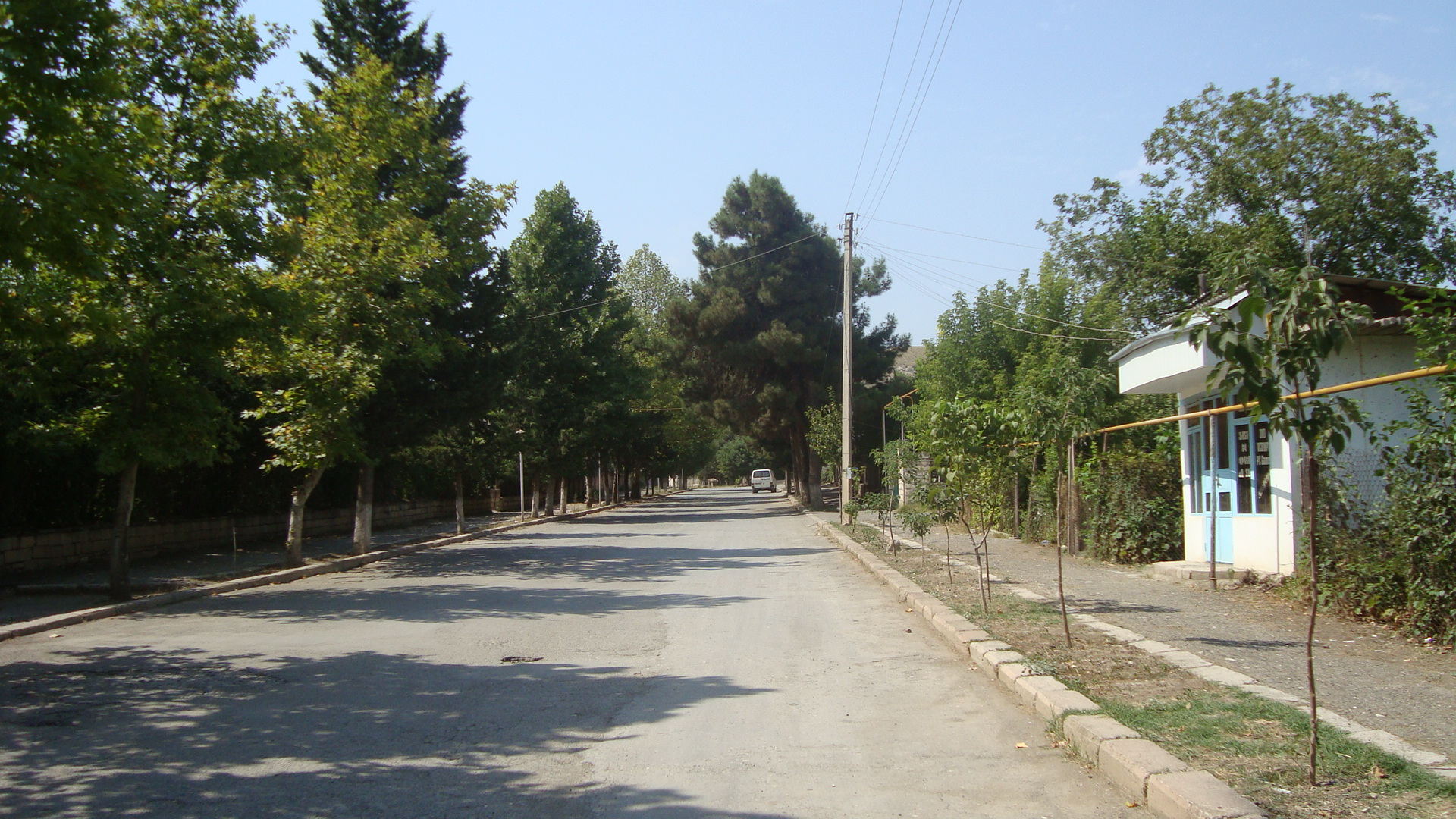

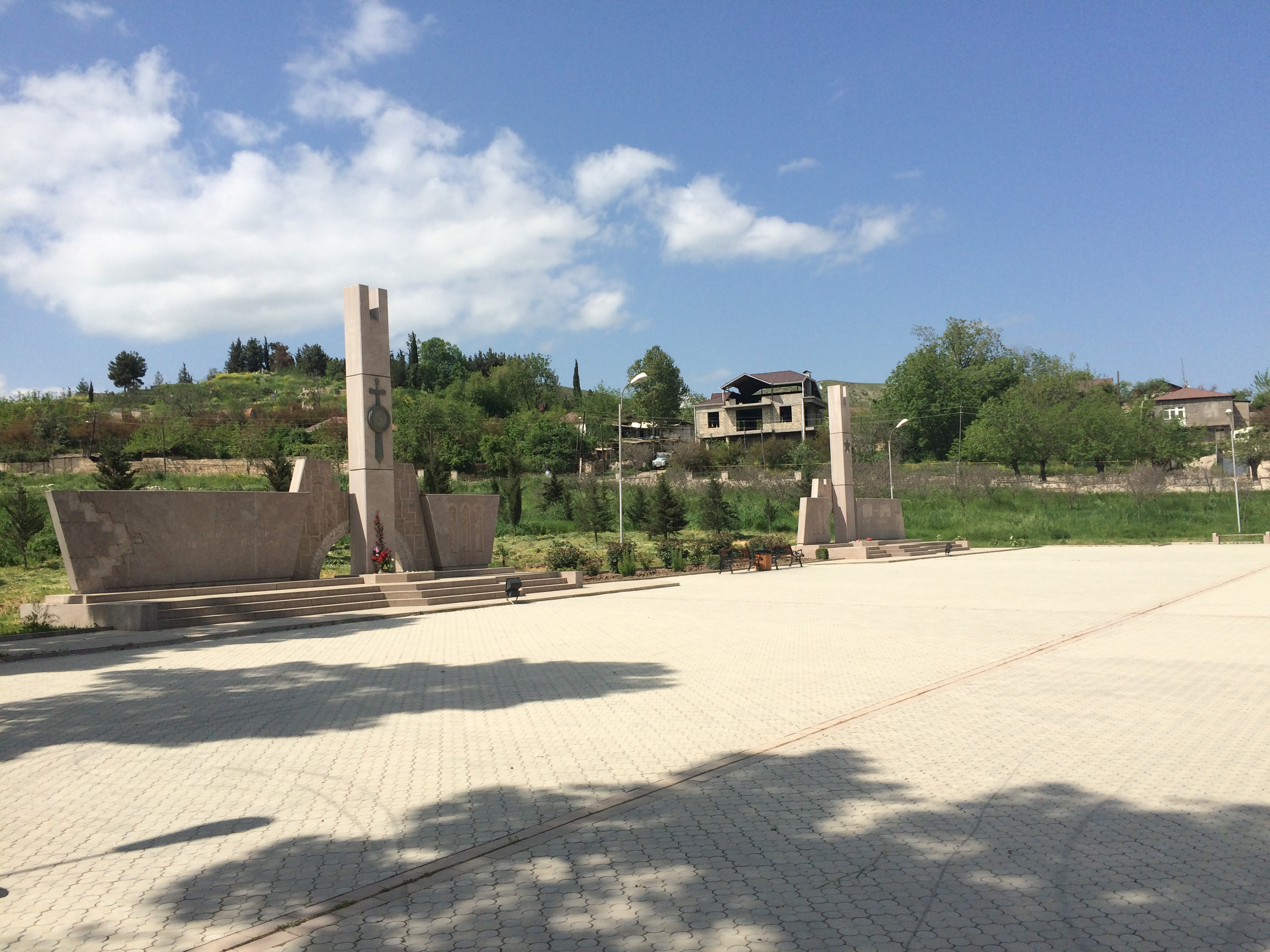
A memorial in Martuni

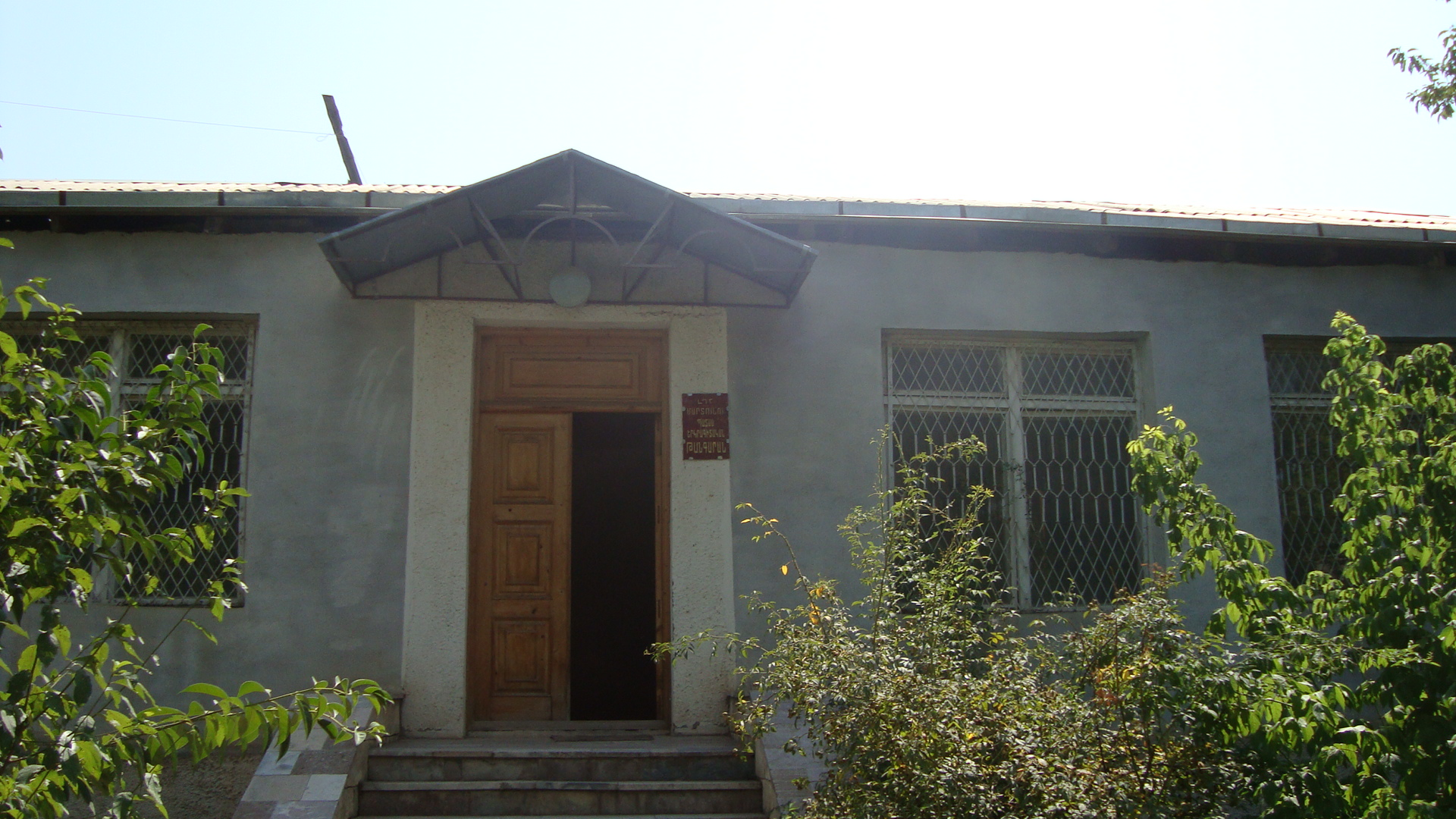
Martuni Museum

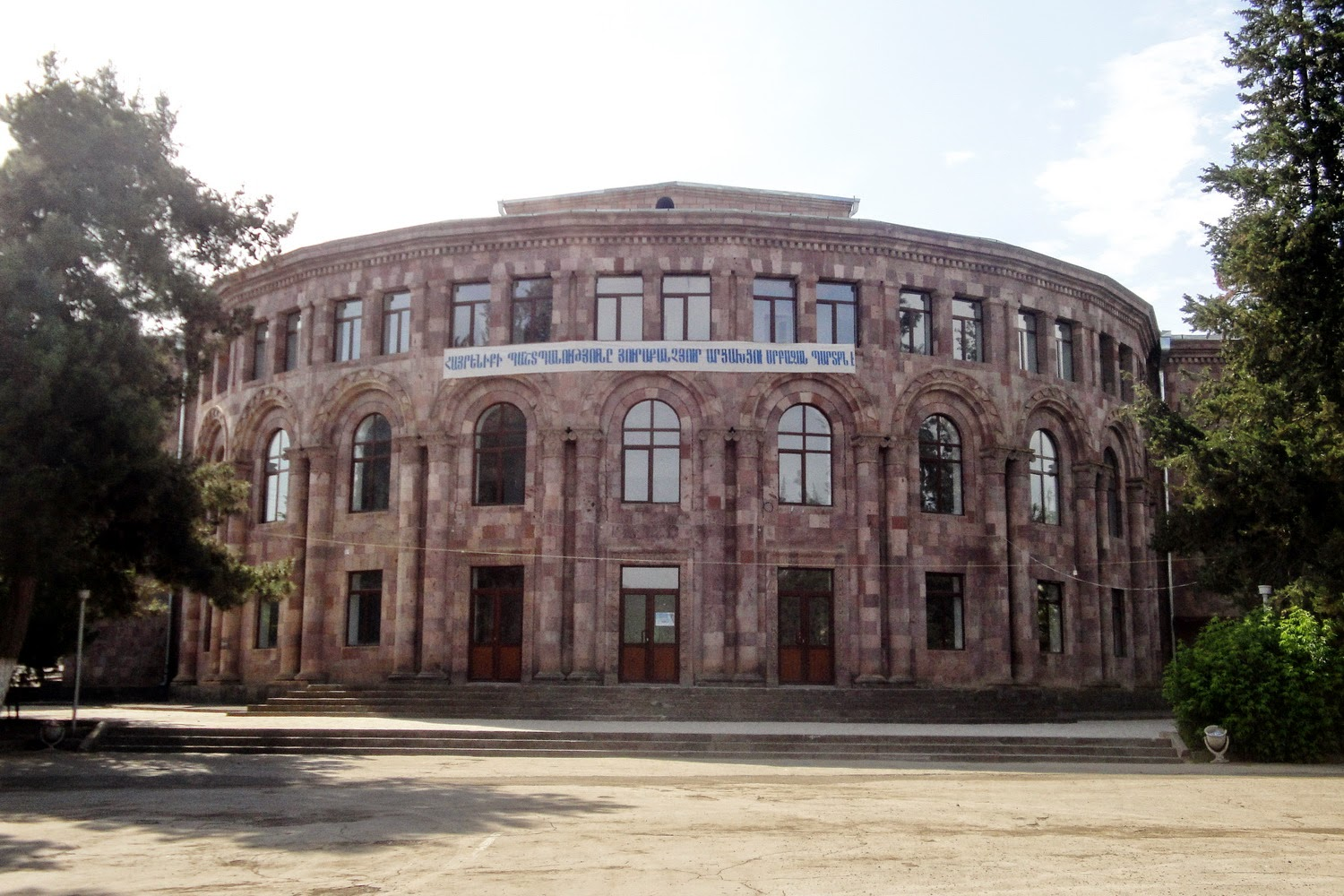
Martuni House of Culture ("The Opera")

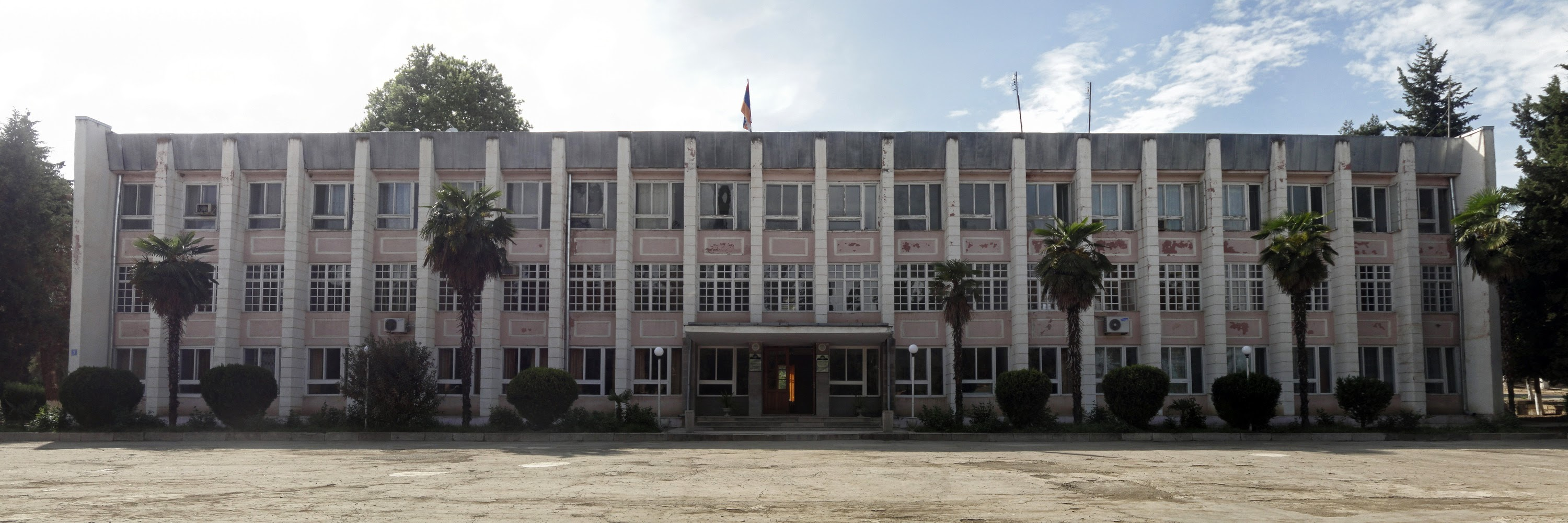
Municipal building

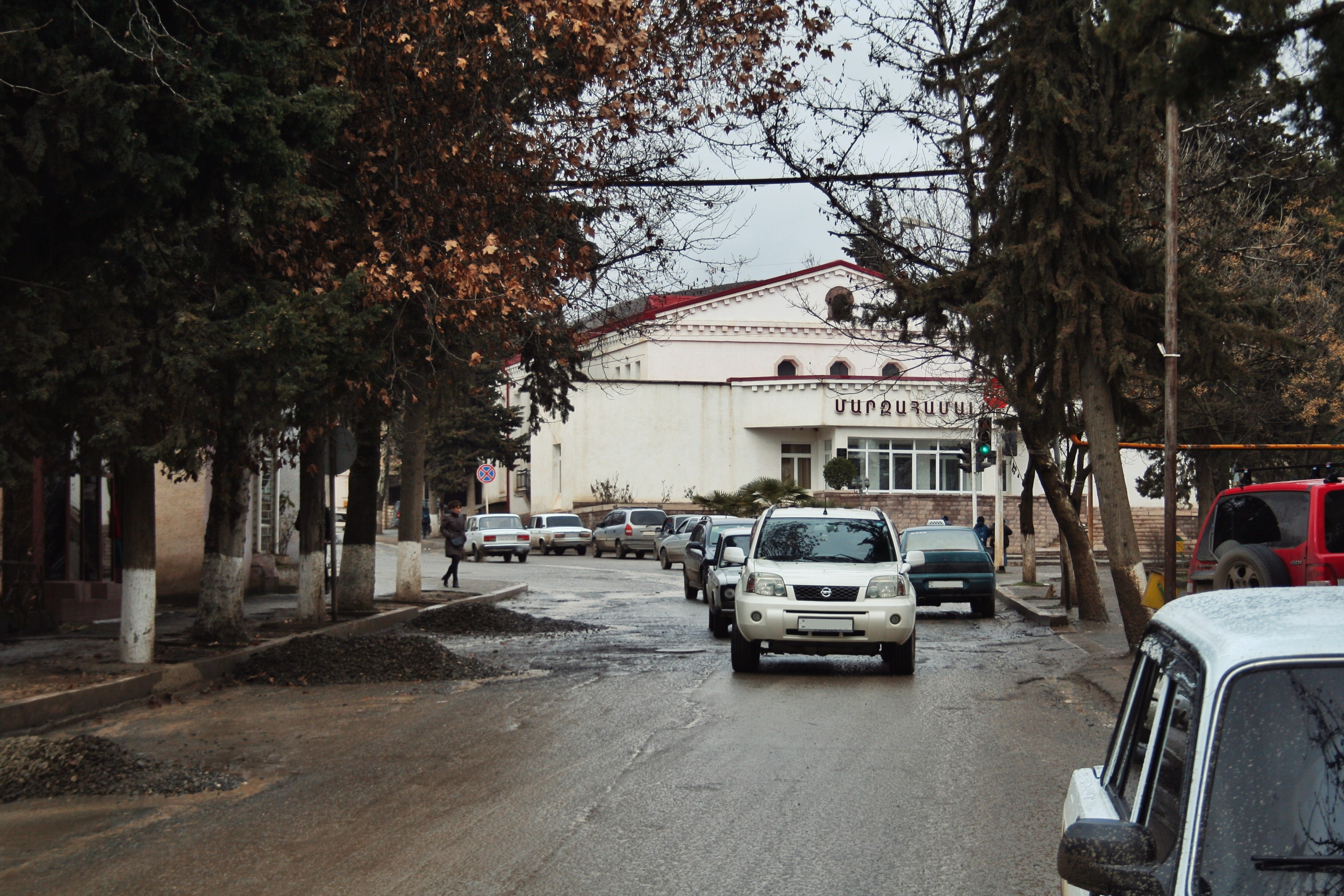
