= Meşəli, Khojaly =

Meshali / Lesnoy Meşəli / Լեսնոյ
- Location within Azerbaijan
- Coordinates: 39°53′55.4″N 46°37′06.6″E
- Country: Azerbaijan
  - District: Khojaly
- Time zone: UTC+4 (AZT)

Meshali (Azerbaijani: Meşəli) or Lesnoy (Armenian: Լեսնոյ) is a village in the Khojaly District of Azerbaijan. The village is located in the mountains to the west of the village of Patara.

== History ==
Memorial wrote about the forced exodus of the Azerbaijani inhabitants of the village, along with several other Azerbaijani villages around the area during the First Nagorno-Karabakh War. They emphasized the grave violence against Azerbaijani civilians in Meshali specifically.
