= Salakətin =

- Location within Azerbaijan Location within Karabakh Economic Region
- Coordinates: 39°37′47″N 46°59′21″E
- Country: Azerbaijan
- District: Khojavend
- Time zone: UTC+4 (AZT)

Salakətin (Salaketin) is a village situated in Khojavend District of Azerbaijan, it is the centre of the Salakatin rural administrative-territorial county.

== Geography ==
The village of Salakatin is part of the Salakatin rural administrative-territorial county of the Khojavend district, and the village of Salakatin is the centre of this rural administrative-territorial area. The village is located on the Karabakh Ridge.

== History ==
During the Soviet period, the village was part of the Azykh village council of Hadrut district in the Nagorno-Karabakh Autonomous Region (NKAR) of Azerbaijan SSR and had an overwhelmingly Azerbaijani population. In 1926, a school was built in the village.

== Population ==
According to the "Caucasian Calendar" of 1856, Salakatin was inhabited by "Tatars" Sunnis (Azerbaijani Sunnis), who spoke "Tatar" (Azerbaijani) among themselves.

In the family lists of 1886, it was noted that the village of Salakatin in the Shusha district, Elizavetpol province had 96 residents (52 men and 44 women; 21 households) being Azerbaijanis (referred to as "Tatars") of Shia Muslim faith.

== Economy ==
Before the conflict, the village's population was engaged in viticulture, grain farming, animal husbandry, and sericulture. The village had severely suffered as a result of the Karabakh conflict and, after coming under the control of the unrecognized NKR, was burned and vandalised.
