= Muğanlı, Khojavend =

Mughanly
- Azerbaijani: Muğanlı
- Location within Azerbaijan
- Coordinates: 39°49′36″N 47°08′28″E
- Country: Azerbaijan
- District: Khojavend
- Time zone: UTC+4 (AZT)

Muğanlı (Mughanly) is a village located in Khojavend District of Azerbaijan, it is the centre of the Mughanli rural administrative-territorial country.

== Geography ==
The village of Mughanli is part of the Mughanli rural administrative-territorial county of Khojavend district, and the village of Mughanli is the centre of this rural administrative-territorial county. It is located at an altitude of 298 m.

== History ==
Under Soviet rule, in 1977, the village of Mughanli was part of Martuni settlement council of the Martuni district of Nagorno-Karabakh Autonomous Region (NKAR) of Azerbaijan SSR.

According to the Trilateral Statement signed on the night of 9-10 November 2020, following the Second Karabakh War, the village came under the control of the Russian peacekeeping forces.

As a result of the fighting operation that took place in September 2023, Azerbaijan restored its control over the village.

== Population ==
In 1921, the village had a population of 309 people, all of whom were Azerbaijanis (referred to as "Azerbaijani Turks").

According to the publication "Administrative Division of ASSR" prepared in 1933 by the Department of National Economic Accounting of the Azerbaijan SSR (AzNEA), as of 1 January 1933, there were 183 people living in Mughanli (50 households, 91 men and 92 women). The ethnic composition of the entire Mughanli village council was 94% Turks (Azerbaijanis).
