= Kalbajar–Lachin Economic Region =

Former economic region in Azerbaijan

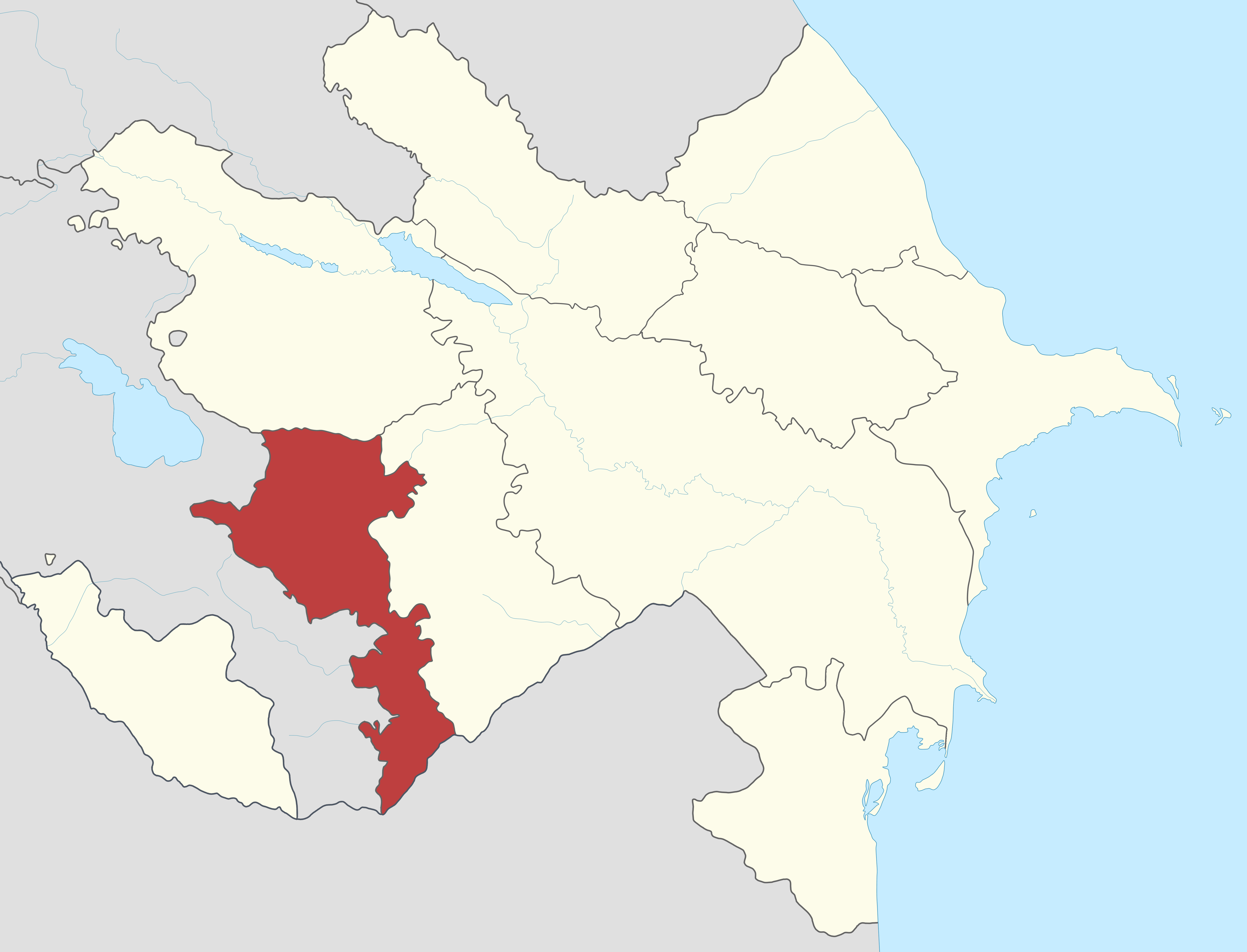
Kalbajar-Lachin Economic Region

Kalbajar-Lachin was one of ten former economic regions of Azerbaijan.

It bordered Armenia to the west and Iran to the south, as well as the economic regions of Upper Karabakh — almost congruous with the Armenian-inhabited Nagorno-Karabakh — and Ganja-Gazakh. The region consisted of the districts of Kalbajar, Lachin, Qubadli and Zangilan.

On July 7, 2021, Azerbaijan reorganized its internal economic regions. During the process, Ilham Aliyev created a new region out of Kalbajar-Lachin and Jabrayil District of Nagorno-Karabakh.

The new region is now called the East Zangezur Economic Region. The name is motivated by Azerbaijani irredentism; it borders Armenia's Syunik province, implying that there is a "Western Zangezur" – that is, Syunik itself.

For a long time, the Kalbajar-Lachin economic region had been known as agrarian region with large arable lands and pasture areas (sheep- and cattle breeding, livestock products, wool, fodder crops, beekeeping, wine, tobacco, grain-growing, etc.)

== See also ==
- Administrative divisions of Azerbaijan
