= Kuropatkino =

Kuropatkino / Kakavadzor Կաքավաձոր
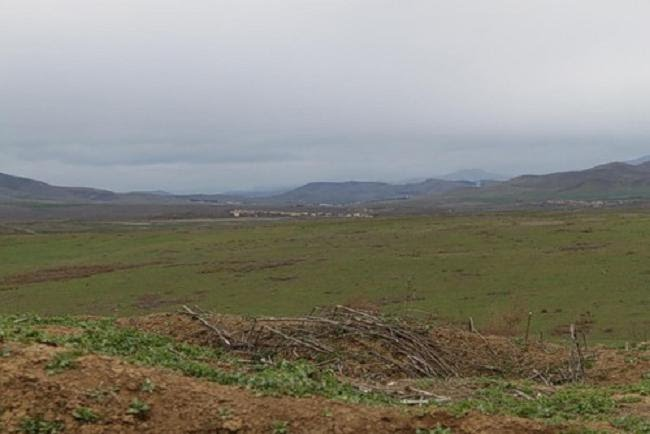

- Location within Azerbaijan
- Coordinates: 39°50′09″N 47°09′42″E
- Country: Azerbaijan
  - District: Khojavend

Population (2005)
  - Total: 30
- Time zone: UTC+4 (AZT)

Kuropatkino (Russian: Куропаткино) or Kakavadzor (Armenian: Կաքավաձոր, Russian: Какавадзор) is a village located in the Khojavend District of Azerbaijan, in the region of Nagorno-Karabakh. The village had an Azerbaijani majority prior to their exodus during the First Nagorno-Karabakh War.

== History ==
During the Soviet period, the village was a part of the Martuni District of the Nagorno-Karabakh Autonomous Oblast.

== Economy and culture ==
The village is part of the community of Martuni.

== Demographics ==
The village had an ethnic Armenian population of 30 inhabitants in 2005.
