= Divanalılar =

- Location within Azerbaijan Location within Karabakh Economic Region
- Coordinates: 39°40′06″N 47°05′11″E
- Country: Azerbaijan
- District: Fuzuli
- Time zone: UTC+4 (AZT)

Divanalılar (Divanalylar) is a village in the Fuzuli District of Azerbaijan. The village had an Azerbaijani majority prior to their expulsion during the First Nagorno-Karabakh War. It was under the control of Armenian forces of the self-proclaimed Republic of Artsakh since the First Nagorno-Karabakh War. However, it was announced to be recaptured by the Azerbaijani Army on November 7, 2020.

Memorial wrote about the forced exodus of the Azerbaijani inhabitants of the village, along with several other Azerbaijani villages around the area.
