= Kərəmli, Goygol =

Kərəmli Բրաջուր • Brajur
- Location within Azerbaijan
- Coordinates: 40°33′29″N 46°13′02″E
- Country: Azerbaijan
- District: Goygol

Population
  - Total: 382
- Time zone: UTC+4 (AZT)

Kərəmli (Karamli; Armenian: Բրաջուր, romanized: Brajur) is a village and municipality in the Goygol District of Azerbaijan. The village had an Armenian population before the exodus of Armenians from Azerbaijan after the outbreak of the Nagorno-Karabakh conflict.

== Toponymy ==
The village was previously known as Qarakeşiş and 26 Bakı Komissarı adına.

== Demographics ==
The village has a population of 382.
