= Kajavan =

Kajavan / Amiranlar Քաջավան / Əmiranlar
- Location within Azerbaijan
- Coordinates: 39°47′59″N 47°07′59″E
- Country: Azerbaijan
  - District: Khojavend

Population (2005)
  - Total: 99
- Time zone: UTC+4 (AZT)

Kajavan (Armenian: Քաջավան) or Amiranlar (Azerbaijani: Əmiranlar) is a village located in the Khojavend District of Azerbaijan, in the region of Nagorno-Karabakh. Until 2023 it was controlled by the breakaway Republic of Artsakh. The village had an ethnic Armenian-majority population until the expulsion of the Armenian population of Nagorno-Karabakh by Azerbaijan following the 2023 Azerbaijani offensive in Nagorno-Karabakh.

== History ==
During the Soviet period, the village was part of the Martuni District of the Nagorno-Karabakh Autonomous Oblast.

== Economy and culture ==
The village is part of the community of Martuni.

== Demographics ==
The village had an ethnic Armenian-majority population of 99 inhabitants in 2005.
