= Tural Ganjaliyev =

Azerbaijani politician

Tural Ganjaliyev Member of the National Assembly of Azerbaijan
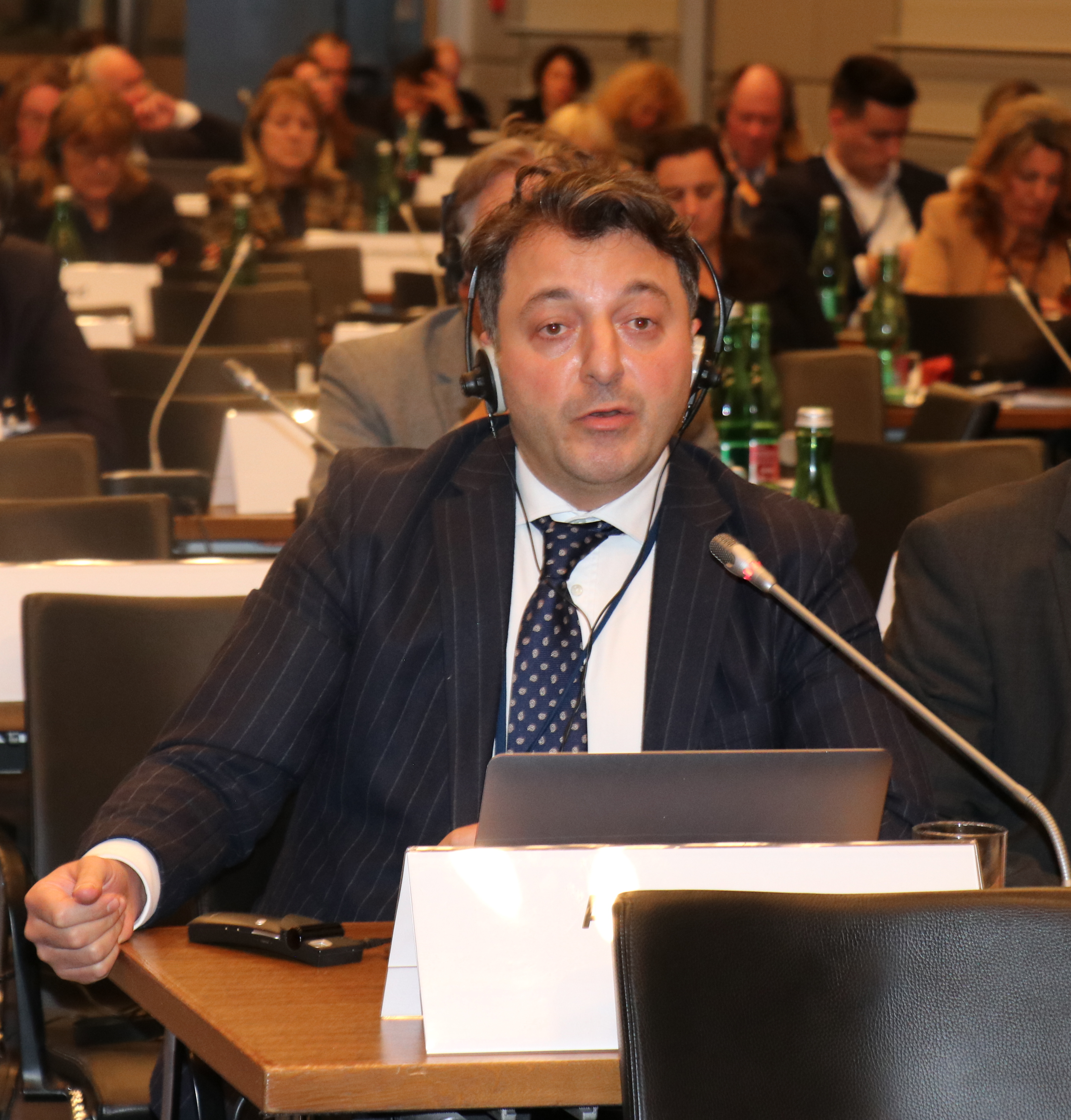
- Ganjaliyev in 2024

Member of the Azerbaijan Parliament for Khankendi
- Incumbent
- Assumed office 10 March 2020
- Preceded by: new constituency

Personal details
- Born: 6 March 1980 (age 46) Shusha, Azerbaijan SSR, USSR
- Party: Independent
- Education: Baku State University
- Occupation: Law
- Profession: School of Law
- Committees: Human Rights Committee

Tural Babashah oglu Ganjaliyev (Azerbaijani: Tural Babaşah oğlu Gəncəliyev; born 6 March 1980) is an Azerbaijani politician who is a Member of the National Assembly of Azerbaijan (VI convocation).

== Early life and education ==
Tural Ganjaliyev was born on March 6, 1980, in Shusha. He spent his childhood in Cholqala mahalle of Shusha, in the same neighbourhood as the lyrical poet Khurshidbanu Natavan, the composer Uzeyir Hajibeyov, and the mugham master Khan Shushinski.

In 1987, he entered the tar class at the music school named after Niyazi in Shusha. At the same time, he attended chess classes when his father was appointed as the director of Babashah Children's Chess School. He participated in music and chess competitions in Nagorno-Karabakh.

After the capture of Shusha by Armenian forces he moved to Baku in May 1992 and continued his secondary education and music education in Baku as an internally displaced person. In 1995, he won the Music Contest held in memory of Haji Khanmammadov among music schools in Baku. He also performed at the Azerbaijan State Philharmonic Hall and Rashid Behbudov State Song Theatre.

In 2000, he graduated from Baku State University Law School, where he later received a master's degree.

== Career ==
On August 5, 2004, he was appointed as the Assistant of the Security Affairs Department of the Ministry of Foreign Affairs of the Republic of Azerbaijan, on January 16, 2006, as an attaché of the same department, and on May 1, 2008. As a Third Secretary.

He was posted to the Embassy of the Republic of Azerbaijan in Canada in December 2008. After a long-term mission at the Embassy, Ganjaliyev was assigned to the North and Central America Division of the US Department of Ministry of Foreign Affairs on January 25, 2013. On April 8, 2014, he was appointed First Secretary. From October 1, 2014, Ganjaliyev served as First Secretary of the Embassy of the Republic of Azerbaijan to the Czech Republic. On November 16, 2017, he was sent to Austria to attend the OSCE Human Dimension Conference held in Vienna as a representative of the Azerbaijani Community of Nagorno-Karabakh.

He was recalled to the Ministry of Foreign Affairs on October 1, 2018, after completing his long-term mission in the Czech Republic. During his tenure at the Ministry of Foreign Affairs, he was sent abroad (Germany, Bulgaria, Egypt, etc.) to attend a number of diplomatic courses and seminars.

Ganjaliyev was elected a new chairman of the community by the decision of the Azerbaijani Community of the Nagorno-Karabakh region of Azerbaijan on December 20, 2018. He held office until it was dissolved when its goals were deemed fulfilled in 2021. He is a Member of the National Assembly of Azerbaijan (VI convocation) for Khankendi #122.

He is fluent in English, French and Russian.
