= Imar, Nagorno-Karabakh =

Imar / Karamli Իմար / Kərəmli
- Location within Azerbaijan Location within East Zangezur Economic Region
- Coordinates: 40°09′51.9″N 46°26′54.6″E
- Country: Azerbaijan
  - District: Aghdara
- Elevation: 1,155 m (3,789 ft)
- Time zone: UTC+4 (AZT)

Imar (Armenian: Իմար) or Karamli (Azerbaijani: Kərəmli) is a village located in the Aghdara District of Azerbaijan, in the region of Nagorno-Karabakh. The village had an Azerbaijani-majority population prior to their expulsion during the Nagorno-Karabakh war.

== Toponymy ==
The village was previously known as Imarat Garvand (Azerbaijani: İmarət Qərvənd).

== History ==
During the Soviet period, the village was part of the Mardakert District of the Nagorno-Karabakh Autonomous Oblast.

The human rights organisation Memorial reported about the forced expulsion of the Azerbaijani inhabitants of the village in 1991, along with several other Azerbaijani villages around the area. The village was fully burned to the ground by Armenian forces.
