= Shahumyan Province =

Coordinates: 40.1067°N 46.0383°E

Shahumyan Շահումյան
- Province
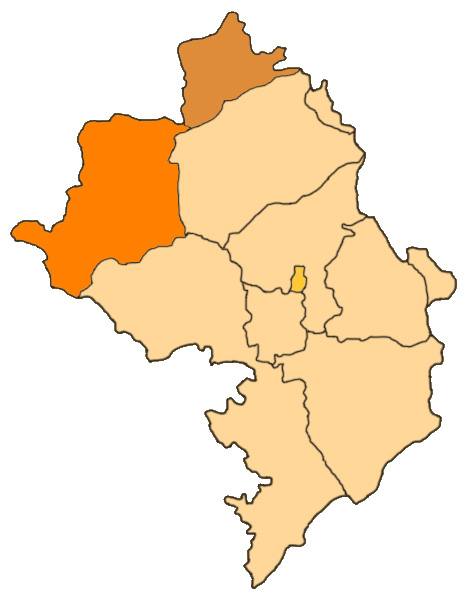
- Capital: 1991–1992 — Shahumyan; 1993–2020 — Karvachar

Area
  - Total: 1,830 km^{2} (710 sq mi)
  - Rank: Ranked 3rd

Population (2013)
  - Total: 3,521
  - Rank: Ranked 8th
  - Density: 1.92/km^{2} (4.98/sq mi)

Shahumyan Province (Armenian: Շահումյան, romanized: Shahumyan, also spelled Shaumyan and Shahumian) was a province of the breakaway Republic of Artsakh, de jure part of the Republic of Azerbaijan. The capital of the province was Karvachar. Shahumyan Province had 17 communities of which one is considered urban and 16 are rural. Its bordered Martakert Province to the east, Kashatagh Province to the south, Gegharkunik and Vayots Dzor provinces of Armenia to the west and Dashkasan, Goygol and Goranboy districts of Azerbaijan to the north.

The western part of the province, corresponding to the Kalbajar District of Azerbaijan, was controlled by Artsakh from 1993 to 2020, while the northern part, originally the Shahumyan District of the Azerbaijani SSR (now part of the Goranboy District), remained under Azerbaijani control from 1992 but was claimed by Artsakh. The Shahumyan District was located outside of the former Nagorno-Karabakh Autonomous Oblast, but prior to the First Nagorno-Karabakh War, its population was mostly Armenian and was expelled during Operation Ring in 1991. While the Shahumyan region was not part of the Nagorno-Karabakh Autonomous Oblast, representatives from Shahumyan declared independence along with the oblast, and the proclamation of Artsakh includes the Shahumyan region within its borders.

== History ==
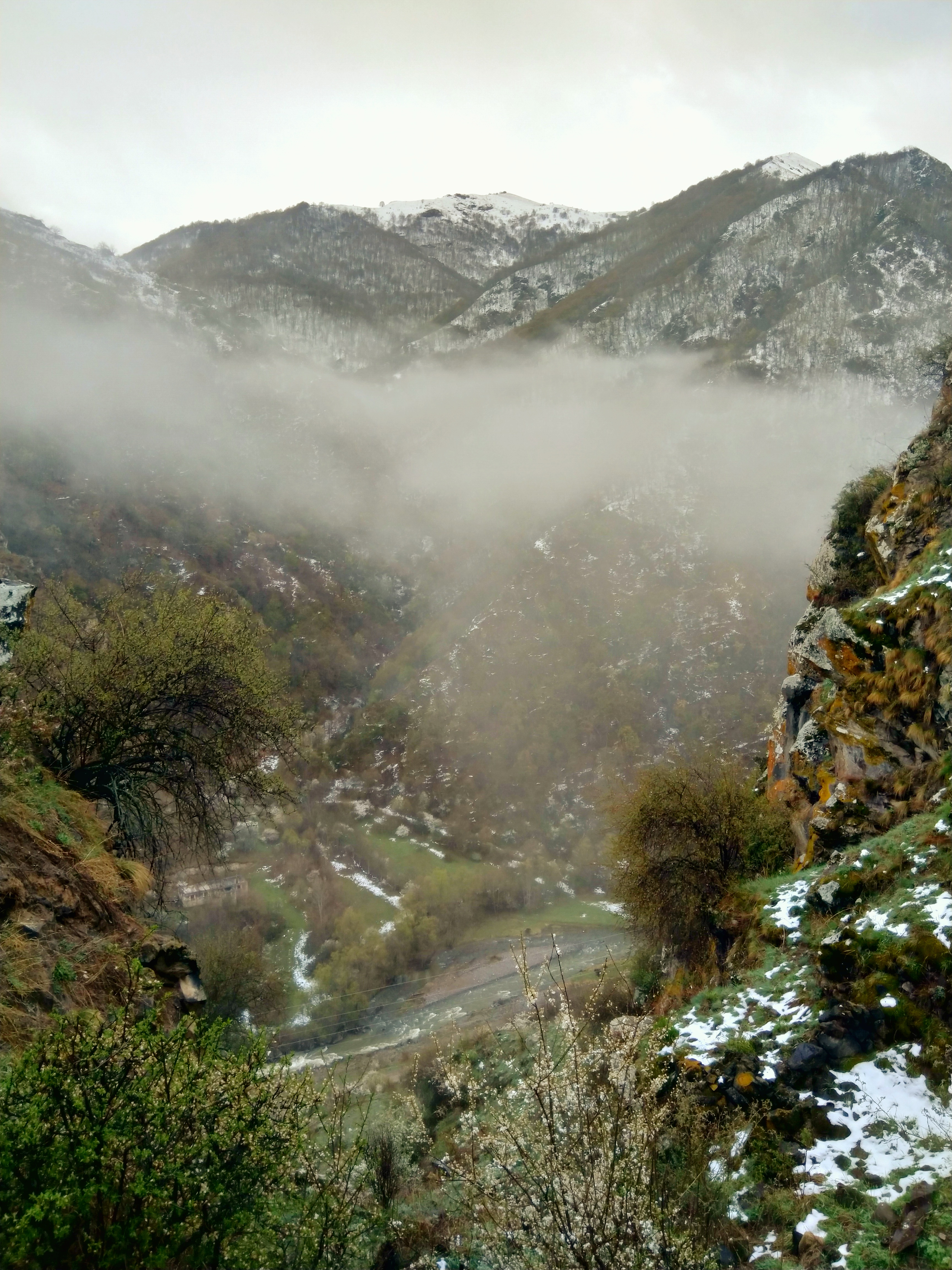
Tartar river gorge

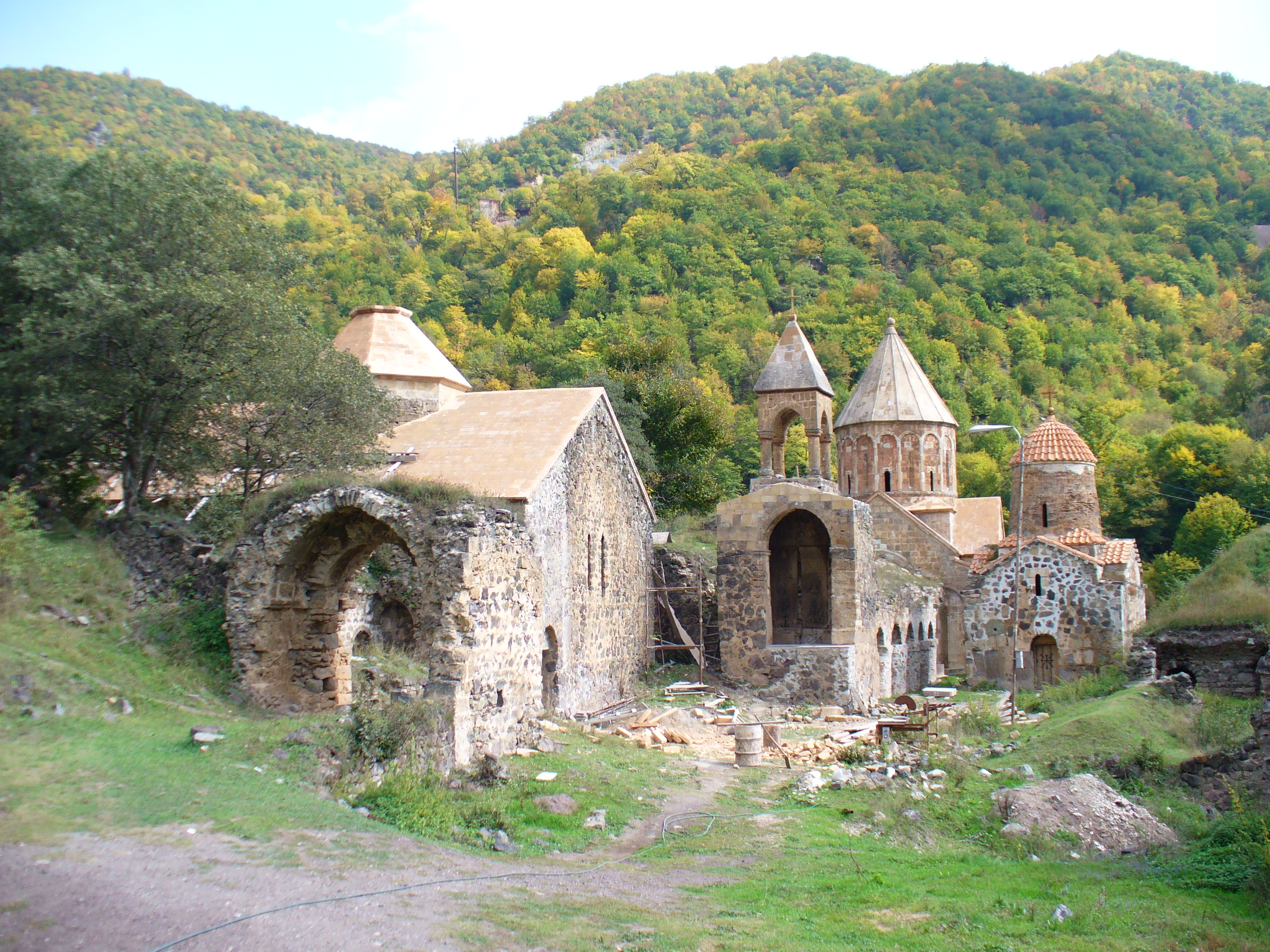
The 9th–13th century Armenian monastery of Dadivank

In antiquity the territory was a part of the province of Artsakh of Greater Armenia. In the Middle Ages it was part of the principality of Khachen; in the 17th and 18th centuries, the territory formed part of the Melik-Abovian dynasty's melikdom of Gulistan, with its capital in the fortress of that name.

During Soviet times the area was a part of the Azerbaijan SSR and was renamed Shahumyan (Shaumyanovksy raion in Russian) after the Armenian Bolshevik Stepan Shahumyan, its administrative centre (Shahumyan or Shaumyanovsk) taking the same name. The population of the Shahumyan District was mostly ethnic Armenian, although the area was not included within the boundaries of the Nagorno-Karabakh Autonomous Oblast.

In the spring/summer of 1991, Soviet general secretary Mikhail Gorbachev ordered Operation Ring in which the Soviet Red Army and Azerbaijani OMON surrounded some of the area's Armenian villages (as well as Getashen and Martunashen in the neighboring Khanlar District of the Azerbaijan SSR) and deported their inhabitants to Armenia.

Approximately 17,000 Armenians living in Shahumyan's 23 villages were deported from the region. The operation involved ground troops, military, armored vehicles and artillery. The deportations of Armenian civilians were carried out with gross human rights violations documented by international human rights organizations. Armenian forces recaptured most of Shahumyan in fall 1991, and the region was included in the Nagorno-Karabakh Republic when it declared its independence in December 1991. However, Armenian forces lost control of Shahumyan in summer 1992 after an Azerbaijani offensive.

The town of Shahumyan was subsequently renamed to Aşağı Ağcakənd by Azerbaijan in 1992 and partially repopulated by Azerbaijanis, mostly representing internally displaced persons deported from Nagorno-Karabakh and surrounding districts.

Armenian forces captured the Kalbajar District of Azerbaijan in 1993 and administered it as a part of Shahumyan Province.

As part of an agreement that ended the 2020 Nagorno-Karabakh War, the town of Kalbajar (Karvachar) and its surrounding district were returned to Azerbaijani control. The initial deadline of 15 November 2020, but this was extended to 25 November 2020. It was the second region to be returned to Azerbaijan per the ceasefire agreement, after Aghdam.

== Towns in Soviet Shahumyan and Getashen ==
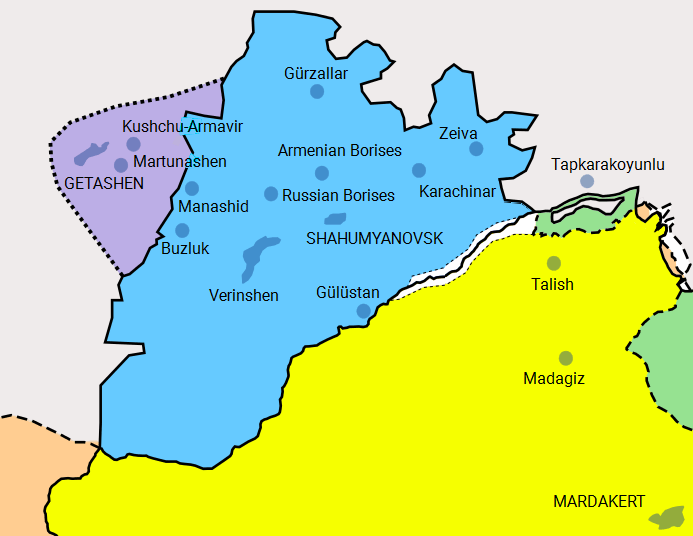
Former Soviet Shahumyan district and the territory known as "Getashen subdistrict" where the Artsakh Shahumyan Province was originally formed

Armenians constituted 73.2% of the population of the Shahumyan District of the Azerbaijan SSR in 1979, and the majority of the villages within the Shahumyan district and the Getashen village had an Armenian majority prior to the First Nagorno-Karabakh war and Operation Ring, with the exception for some Azerbaijani-majority villages (as well as some smaller localities), which are mentioned as such in the following list. The Shahumyan district and Getashen subdistrict are claimed by the Republic of Artsakh as part of the Shahumyan Province.

=== Shahumyan district ===
City/town/village	In Armenian	Population	Control	Image
Başqışlaq (Azerbaijani majority)			Azerbaijan	
Buzluk	Բուզլուկ		Azerbaijan	
Erkej	Էրքեջ		Azerbaijan	
Gürzallar (Azerbaijani majority)			Azerbaijan	
Gyulistan	Գյուլիստան		Azerbaijan	
Hay Borisner	Հայ Բորիսներ		Azerbaijan	
Karachinar	Կարաչինար		Azerbaijan	
Kharkhaput	Խարխապուտ		Azerbaijan	
Menashen	Մենաշեն		Azerbaijan	
Rus Borisi			Azerbaijan	
Shafak	Շաֆակ		Azerbaijan	
Shahumyan	Շահումյան		Azerbaijan	
Todan (Azerbaijani majority)			Azerbaijan	
Verinshen	Վերինշեն		Azerbaijan	
Zeiva (Azerbaijani majority)			Azerbaijan	

=== Getashen subdistrict ===
City/town/village	In Armenian	Population	Control	Image
Azat	Ազատ		Azerbaijan	
Getashen	Գետաշեն		Azerbaijan	
Kamo	Կամո		Azerbaijan	
Kushchi-Armavir	Կուշչի Արմավիր		Azerbaijan	
Martunashen	Մարտունաշեն		Azerbaijan	
Sarısu (Azerbaijani majority)			Azerbaijan	
