= Şəfəq =

Şəfəq or Shefek may refer to:

- Şəfəq, Beylagan, Azerbaijan
- Şəfəq, Goranboy, Azerbaijan
- Şəfəq, Absheron, Azerbaijan
