= Shahen Meghrian =

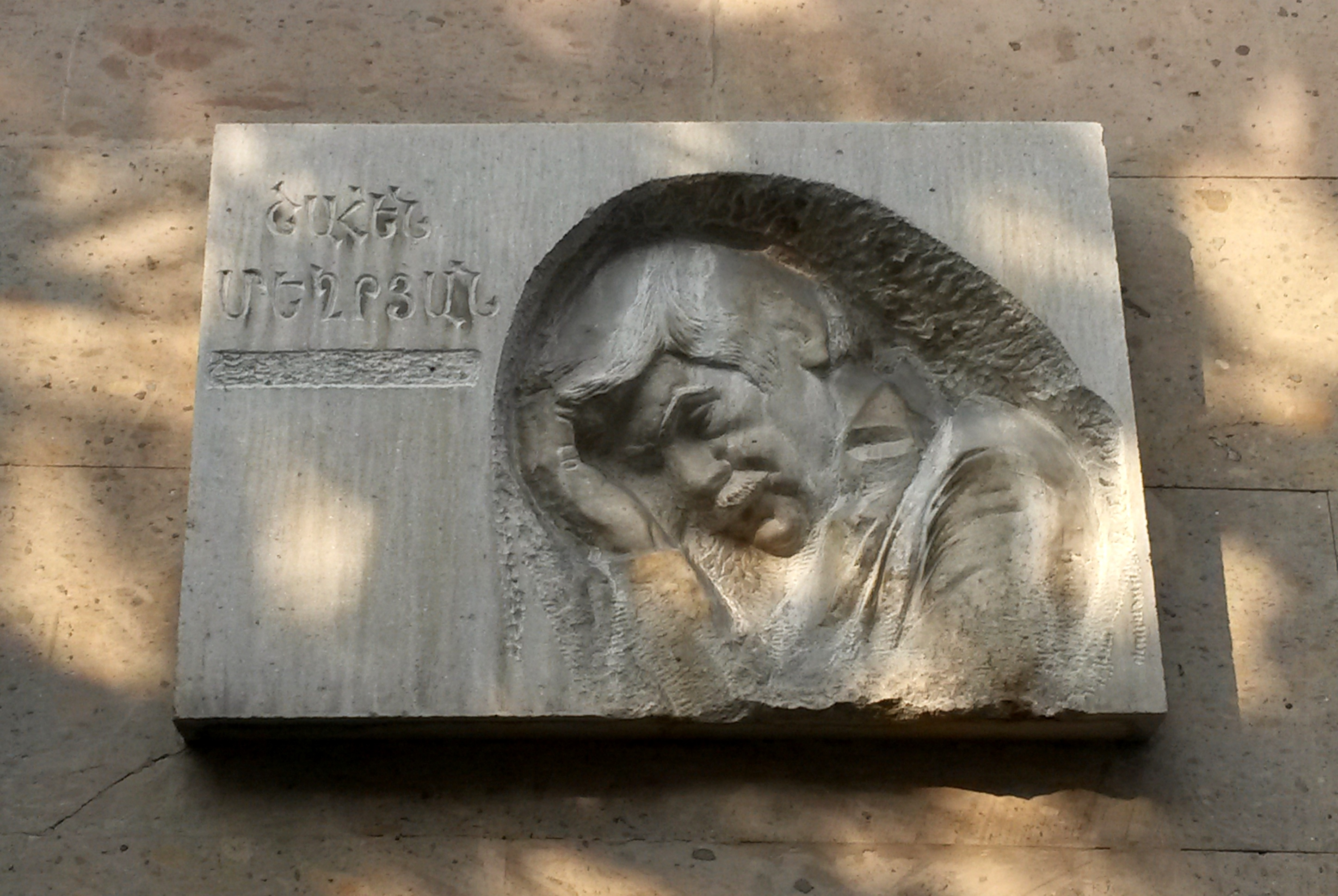
- Shahen Meghryan's Plaque in Yerevan
- Born: 2 January 1952; Gulistan, Azerbaijan SSR, Soviet Union
- Died: 17 April 1993 (aged 41); Shahumian region, Nagorno-Karabakh Republic
- Military career
- Allegiance: Armenia
- Nickname: Eagle of Shahumian
- Conflicts: First Nagorno-Karabakh War
- Awards: Hero of Artsakh

Shahen Zinavori Meghrian (Armenian: Շահեն Զինավորի Մեղրյան; 2 January 1952 – 17 April 1993) was an Armenian military commander and political activist. He was known as the Eagle of Shahumian (Armenian: Շահումյանի արծիվ, Shahumiani Ardziv).

== Biography ==
Meghrian was born in a traditional and well-known Armenian family of Gulistan village. He finished the local school of Gulistan, then continued his education at Yerevan State University. After graduation Meghrian became the chief economist of manufacturing and production in the Shahumian region. In 1988 he formed the first Defense brigade of Shahumian. In 1990 Meghrian successfully led the Battle of Manashid. In 1990 he joined the Armenian Revolutionary Federation. In the summer of 1991 he became the commander of the Shahumian defense forces. From 28 December 1991 he was also a member of the parliament of the Nagorno-Karabakh Republic. After the forced deportations of the population of Shahumian region of the Nagorno-Karabakh Republic, Meghrian had a speech that ended with words: "Shahumian is occupied, but isn't defeated!"

In June 1992, Meghryan formed a detachment of 25 people in the village of Haterk and went behind enemy lines in the Martakert region. Meghryan's detachment participated in the recapture of a number of villages in the Martakert region, including Haterk, Umudlu, Madagiz, Tonashen, Dastagir, and the Sarsang Reservoir.

On 11 March 1993, Meghryan was appointed the commander of a military unit by the Ministry of Defense of Armenia. On 17 April 1993, he was killed along with several of his comrades-in-arms when their helicopter was shot down while they were flying from Shahumian to Armenia.

On 24 October 2014, he was posthumously awarded the title Hero of Artsakh.
