= Ağcakənd =

Ağcakənd or Aghjakand or Agdzhakend may refer to:

- Ağcakənd, Kalbajar, Azerbaijan
- Ağcakənd, Khojavend, Azerbaijan
- Ağcakənd, Lachin, Azerbaijan
- Aşağı Ağcakənd, Azerbaijan
- Yuxarı Ağcakənd, Azerbaijan
