= Buzluq =

Buzluq Բուզլուխ • Buzlukh
- Municipality
- Location within Azerbaijan
- Coordinates: 40°24′55″N 46°25′59″E
- Country: Azerbaijan
- District: Goranboy

Population
  - Total: 315
- Time zone: UTC+4 (AZT)

Buzluq (Buzlug, lit. 'iced'; Armenian: Բուզլուխ, romanized: Buzlukh) is a village and municipality in the Goranboy District of Azerbaijan. The municipality consists of the villages of Buzluq, Gülüstan, and Başqışlaq. The village had an Armenian majority prior to the First Nagorno-Karabakh War and Operation Ring.

== History ==
During the Soviet period, the people of Buzluq were mainly engaged in agriculture with considerable achievements due to the heavy subsidization policy by the Azerbaijan SSR government.

With the outbreak of the conflict between Nagorno-Karabakh and Azerbaijan, the people of Buzluq were targeted by Azeri OMON units. The village was attacked from the nearby Azeri-populated villages of Shafag and Zeyva. In the summer of 1991 the village was occupied by Azeri OMON forces and was subsequently looted. Soviet troops stationed in Kirovabad took an active role in aiding Azeri forces in deporting the Armenian population from the area, which has come to be known as Operation Ring. In the fall of 1991, Armenian forces captured the village. Later it was occupied together with the whole Shahumyan district by Azerbaijani forces in June 1992.

Buzluq was one of 13 Armenian villages of the former Shahumyan region, which voted in the 1991 referendum to reunite with Nagorno-Karabakh and declare independence from the Azerbaijan Soviet Socialist Republic. It is now incorporated into the Goranboy District of the Republic of Azerbaijan.
