= Paskaleva =

Paskaleva may refer to:

- Katya Paskaleva (born 1945), Bulgarian film and stage actress
- Tsvetana Paskaleva, Armenian journalist of Bulgarian descent

See also

- Paskalev (disambiguation)
