= Erkech =

Erkech may refer to -

- Erkeç, a small village in Azerbaijan
- The former name of Kozichino near Pomorie in Bulgaria
- The distinctive Erkech dialect that originated in the Erkech/Kozichino area of Bulgaria
