= Kamo, Azerbaijan =

Kamo Կամո
- Location within Azerbaijan
- Coordinates: 40°29′N 46°21′E
- Country: Azerbaijan
- District: Goygol
- Time zone: UTC+4 (AZT)

Kamo (Armenian: Կամո) was a village in the Goygol District of Azerbaijan. The village and neighboring Azat had an Armenian population before the exodus of Armenians from Azerbaijan after the outbreak of the Nagorno-Karabakh conflict.

In 1989, both villages became home to ethnic Azeri refugees from Sotk (Zod) in Armenia. Azat became the new municipal seat known as Yeni Zod ("New Zod"). Kamo was incorporated into Yeni Zod and lost its status as a village in 1999.

== Toponymy ==
The village was formerly known as Hacışen.

== History ==
The village was a part of the Getashen subdisctrict which participated in the Artsakh declaration of independence.
