= Umudlu, Nagorno-Karabakh =

Umudlu / Aknaberd Ումութլու / Ակնաբերդ
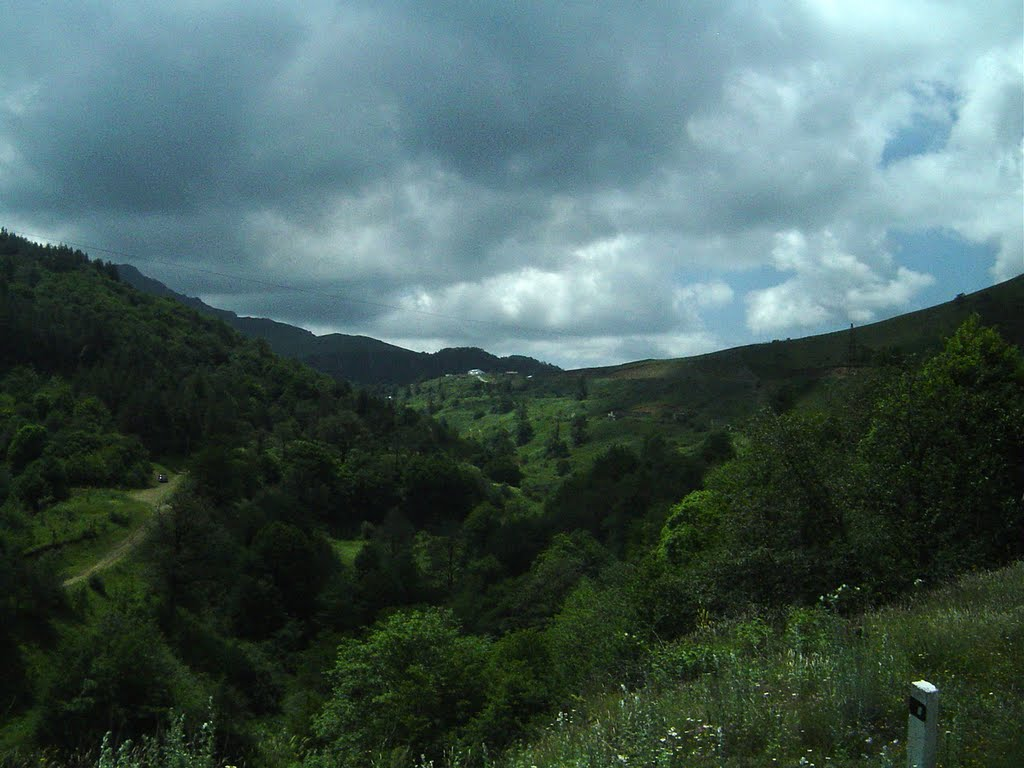

- Location within Azerbaijan
- Coordinates: 40°11′42″N 46°35′25″E
- Country: Azerbaijan
  - District: Aghdara

Population (2015)
  - Total: 586
- Time zone: UTC+4 (AZT)

Umudlu (Armenian: Ումութլու, romanized: Umutlu) or Aknaberd (Armenian: Ակնաբերդ, also Akanaberd Ականաբերդ, and Akana Ականա) is a village located in the Aghdara District of Azerbaijan, in the disputed region of Nagorno-Karabakh. The village had an Azerbaijani-majority population prior to their exodus during the First Nagorno-Karabakh War.

== History ==
During the Soviet period, the village was a part of the Mardakert District of the Nagorno-Karabakh Autonomous Oblast, and was incorporated into the Shahumyan Province of the Republic of Artsakh after the First Nagorno-Karabakh War.

== Economy and culture ==
The population is mainly engaged in agriculture and animal husbandry. As of 2015, the village has a municipal building, a house of culture, a secondary school, a kindergarten, five shops, and a medical centre.

== Demographics ==
According to the "Statistical Data on the Population of the Transcaucasian Territory, Extracted from Family Lists of 1886" (Note: Russian: Свода статистических данных о населении Закавказского края, извлеченных из посемейных списков 1886 года), Umudlu had 241 Tatar (Azerbaijani) inhabitants, with 52 belonging to the upper Muslim class. According to the 1912 publication of the Caucasian Calendar, the village had 362 residents, most of whom were Tatars. According to the 1921 census of the Azerbaijan SSR, the village had 304 Azerbaijani inhabitants. The village also had an Azerbaijani-majority population in 1991. The entire population of the village was evacuated in February 1992, during the First Nagorno-Karabakh War. The village was settled by Armenians after the war.

The village had an ethnic Armenian-majority population, with 482 inhabitants in 2005, and 586 inhabitants in 2015, before the exodus of the Armenian population of Nagorno-Karabakh following the 2023 Azerbaijani offensive in Nagorno-Karabakh.

== Gallery ==
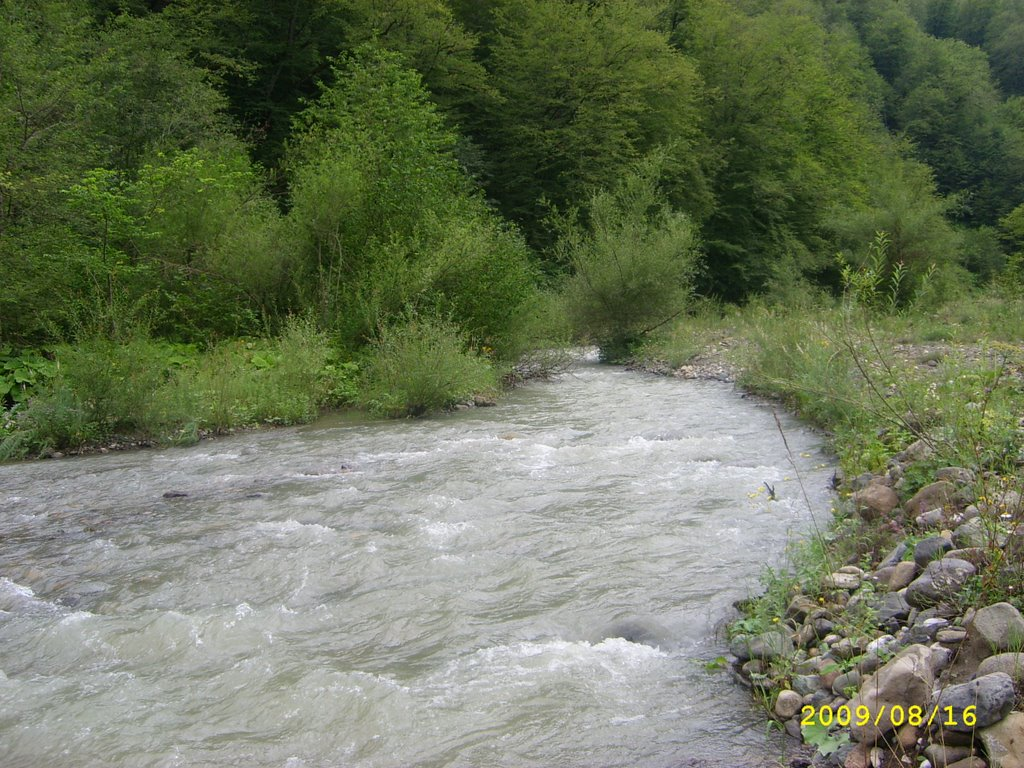
River

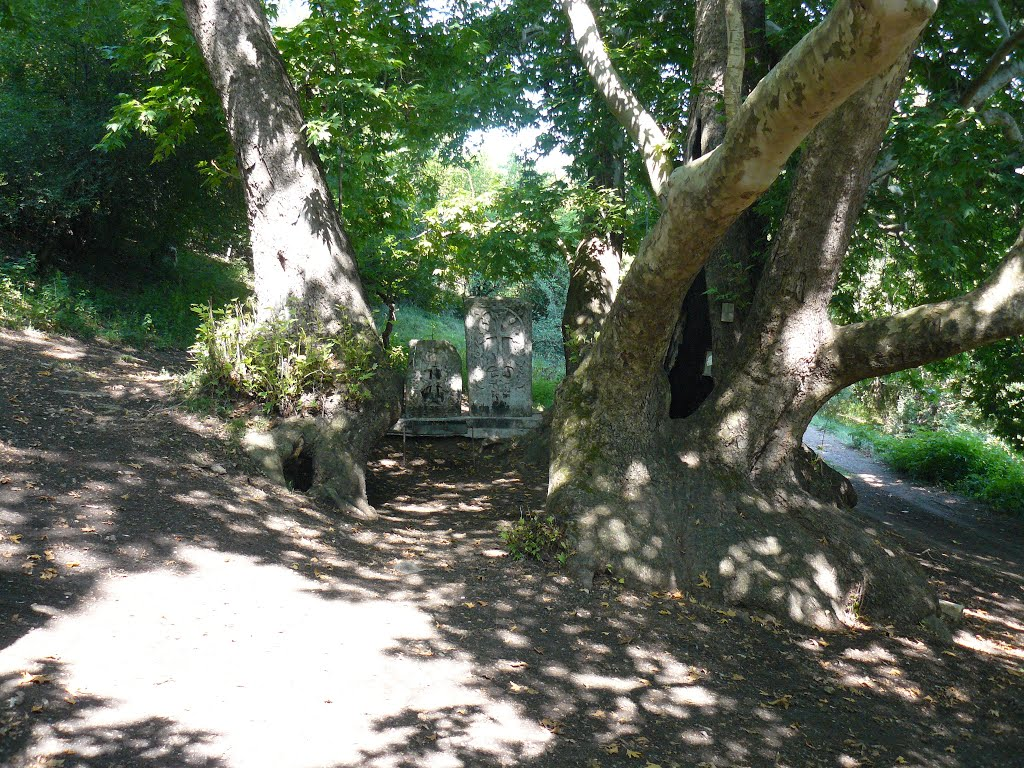
Khachkars
