= Paskalev =

Paskalev (Bulgarian: Паскалев), is a masculine Bulgarian surname, its feminine counterpart is Paskaleva. Notable people with the surname include:

- Anton Paskalev, (born 1958), Bulgarian pole vaulter
- Mikhael Paskalev (born 1987), Norwegian singer-songwriter and musician of Bulgarian origin
- Katya Paskaleva (1945–2002), Bulgarian film and stage actress
- Tsvetana Paskaleva, Armenian journalist of Bulgarian descent
