= Rus Borisi =

Rus Borisi Русские Борисы
- Municipality
- Location within Azerbaijan
- Coordinates: 40°26′08″N 46°30′41″E
- Country: Azerbaijan
- District: Goranboy

Government

Area
  - Total: 4.7 km^{2} (1.8 sq mi)

Population (2009)
  - Total: ca. 500
- Time zone: UTC+4 (AZT)

Rus Borisi (Russian: Русские Борисы; Armenian: Ռուս Պարիս) is a village and municipality in the Goranboy District of Azerbaijan.

== History ==
The village was founded in 1842, according to some sources or in 1893, according to others, by a group of Spiritual Christian Molokan settlers originally from central Russia. In 1932 a kolkhoz which functions to this day was established here, followed by the inclusion of the village in the Shahumian region. Historically the population was composed almost entirely of ethnic Russians and numbered over 2,000 people at its peak. In 1992, Rus Borisi happened to be in the thick of ethnic clashes between ethnic Armenians and Azeris, leading to a military operation and resulting in the mass exodus of the Armenians of Shahumian. The region itself was merged with the Goranboy region. Even though Rus Borisi, similarly to the Azeri villages of the region, remained unaffected by the military actions, the political and economic hardships forced a significant portion of the population of the village to leave for Russia. Beginning in 1994, the village was increasingly populated by ethnic Azeris, mainly internally displaced persons from Nagorno-Karabakh region.

As of 2006, according to the data provided by the executive power of the Goranboy region, the emigration of the ethnic Russian population was still in progress, and there were approximately 70 ethnic Russian families remaining in the village. In 2009, the population of Rus Borisi numbered about 500 persons, of whom only 83 were Russians, consisting mainly of middle-aged and elderly people.

The economy of the village is closely tied to the function of the Kalinin kolkhoz, considered a 'millionaire kolkhoz' back in the Soviet times. As of the late 1970s, it possessed 600 hectares of arable land, five poultry farms with 2,000 layers, a cattle farm of 300 milch cows and 800 head of young bulls and horses. In the 1990s the kolkhoz began functioning on a self-supporting basis, hence currently it only produces cabbage and potato. The village has an aid post and a secondary school with Russian as the language of instruction. The construction of the second Russian-language school intended for up to 180 pupils began in 2009.
