= Qoşasu =

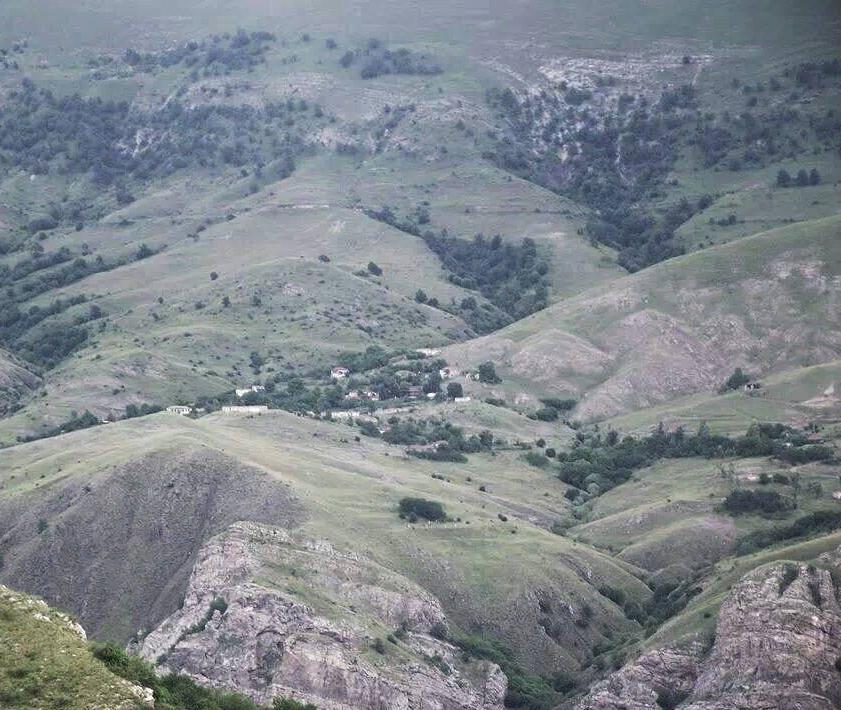

- Location within Azerbaijan Location within East Zangezur Economic Region
- Coordinates: 39°46′44″N 46°20′24″E
- Country: Azerbaijan
- District: Lachin
- Elevation: 1,891 m (6,204 ft)

Population (2005)
  - Total: 34
- Time zone: UTC+4 (AZT)

Qoşasu (Qoshasu) is a village in the Lachin District of Azerbaijan.

== History ==
The village was located in the Armenian-occupied territories surrounding Nagorno-Karabakh, coming under the control of ethnic Armenian forces on May 17, 1992 during the First Nagorno-Karabakh War. The village subsequently became part of the breakaway Republic of Artsakh as part of its Kashatagh Province, referred to as Ani (Armenian: Անի), being part of the Drakhtadzor community. The village was returned to Azerbaijan as part of the 2020 Nagorno-Karabakh ceasefire agreement.
