= Manashid =

Manashid Մենաշեն • Menashen
- Municipality
- Mənəşli
- Location within Azerbaijan
- Coordinates: 40°26′35″N 46°26′51″E
- Country: Azerbaijan
- District: Goranboy

Population
  - Total: 298
- Time zone: UTC+4 (AZT)

Manashid or Mənəşli (Manashli; Armenian: Մենաշեն, romanized: Menashen) is a village and municipality in the Goranboy District of Azerbaijan. It lies south of Todan village.

Today the village has a population of 298, and the municipality consists of two villages: Mənəşli and Erkeç. The village had an Armenian majority prior to the First Nagorno-Karabakh War and Operation Ring.

== History ==
The village was founded as Manashid (or Monashid) by Swiss-German settlers and was once renowned for its cheese.

As part of the Shahumyan district of Soviet Azerbaijan, it was an Armenian-majority village. During the First Nagorno-Karabakh War, the area around Manashid was at the heart of the fighting during Operation Ring in the spring of 1991.

In September 1991 the Chicago Tribune reported that the residents had lived "without electricity, gas and supplies for months" and that school had been cancelled as "residents fear putting all the children in one place that could be shelled".

During Operation Ring, Manashid was emptied of its ethnic Armenian population, and the village was essentially destroyed including the Armenian church of Surb Hovhannes. Some years later it was renamed Mənəşli (Menashli) and settled by Azerbaijanis.
