= Ağcakənd, Lachin =

Ağcakənd
- Location within Azerbaijan Location within East Zangezur Economic Region
- Coordinates: 39°46′16″N 46°21′32″E
- Country: Azerbaijan
- District: Lachin

Population (2005)
  - Total: 44
- Time zone: UTC+4 (AZT)

Ağcakənd (Aghjakend) is a village in the Lachin District of Azerbaijan.

== History ==
The village was located in the Armenian-occupied territories surrounding Nagorno-Karabakh, coming under the control of ethnic Armenian forces during the First Nagorno-Karabakh War in the early 1990s. The village subsequently became part of the breakaway Republic of Artsakh as part of its Kashatagh Province, referred to as Drakhtadzor (Armenian: Դրախտաձոր). The village was returned to Azerbaijan as part of the 2020 Nagorno-Karabakh ceasefire agreement.

== Demographics ==
The community of Drakhtadzor included the village of Ani, and the Drakhtadzor community had a population of 78 in 2005, with 44 in Drakhtadzor and 34 in Ani, and the Drakhtadzor community had a population of 62 in 2015.
