= Başqışlaq =

- Location within Azerbaijan
- Coordinates: 40°23′11″N 46°24′44″E
- Country: Azerbaijan
- District: Goranboy
- Municipality: Buzluq
- Time zone: UTC+4 (AZT)

Başqışlaq (Bashgyshlag) is a village in the Goranboy District of Azerbaijan. The village forms part of the municipality of Buzluq.
