= Meşəli, Goranboy =

Meşəli Խարխապուտ • Kharkhaput
- Location within Azerbaijan
- Coordinates: 40°25′57″N 46°36′39″E
- Country: Azerbaijan
- District: Goranboy

Population (2009)
  - Total: 14
- Time zone: UTC+4 (AZT)

Meşəli (Meshali; until 1998, known as Xarxaput; Armenian: Խարխապուտ) is a village in the municipality of Aşağı Ağcakənd in the Goranboy District of Azerbaijan. The village had an Armenian majority before the First Nagorno-Karabakh War and Operation Ring.
