= Erkeç =

Erkeç Էրքեջ • Erkej
- Location within Azerbaijan
- Coordinates: 40°27′48″N 46°28′20″E
- Country: Azerbaijan
- District: Goranboy
- Municipality: Mənəşli
- Time zone: UTC+4 (AZT)

Erkeç (Erkech; Armenian: Էրքեջ, romanized: Erkej) is a village in the Goranboy District of Azerbaijan. The village forms part of the municipality of Mənəşli. The village had an Armenian majority prior to the First Nagorno-Karabakh War and Operation Ring.

== History ==
Founded in 1828, the village's name comes from a Daghestani term for a horned mountain goat. Though originally the home of Russian settlers, by 1908 the village's then population of 780 was recorded as being majority ethnic Armenian. In June–July 1991, during the Karabakh conflict, the hamlet was depopulated as part of Operation Ring and occupied by the Soviet 23rd Division and the Azerbaijani OMON. Footage of the days before the population's eviction was filmed by Bulgarian-born naturalised Armenian journalist Tsvetana Paskaleva. In September 1991, Armenians recaptured the dilapidated village, but lost it again to Azerbaijan in the summer of 1992.
