= Şəfəq, Absheron =

Şəfəq
- Location within Azerbaijan
- Coordinates: 40°33′18″N 49°34′58″E
- Country: Azerbaijan
- Rayon: Absheron
- Time zone: UTC+4 (AZT)
  - Summer (DST): UTC+5 (AZT)

Şəfəq (also, Shafag) is a village in the Absheron Rayon of Azerbaijan.
