= Sotk =

Village in Gegharkunik, Armenia

Sotk Սոթք
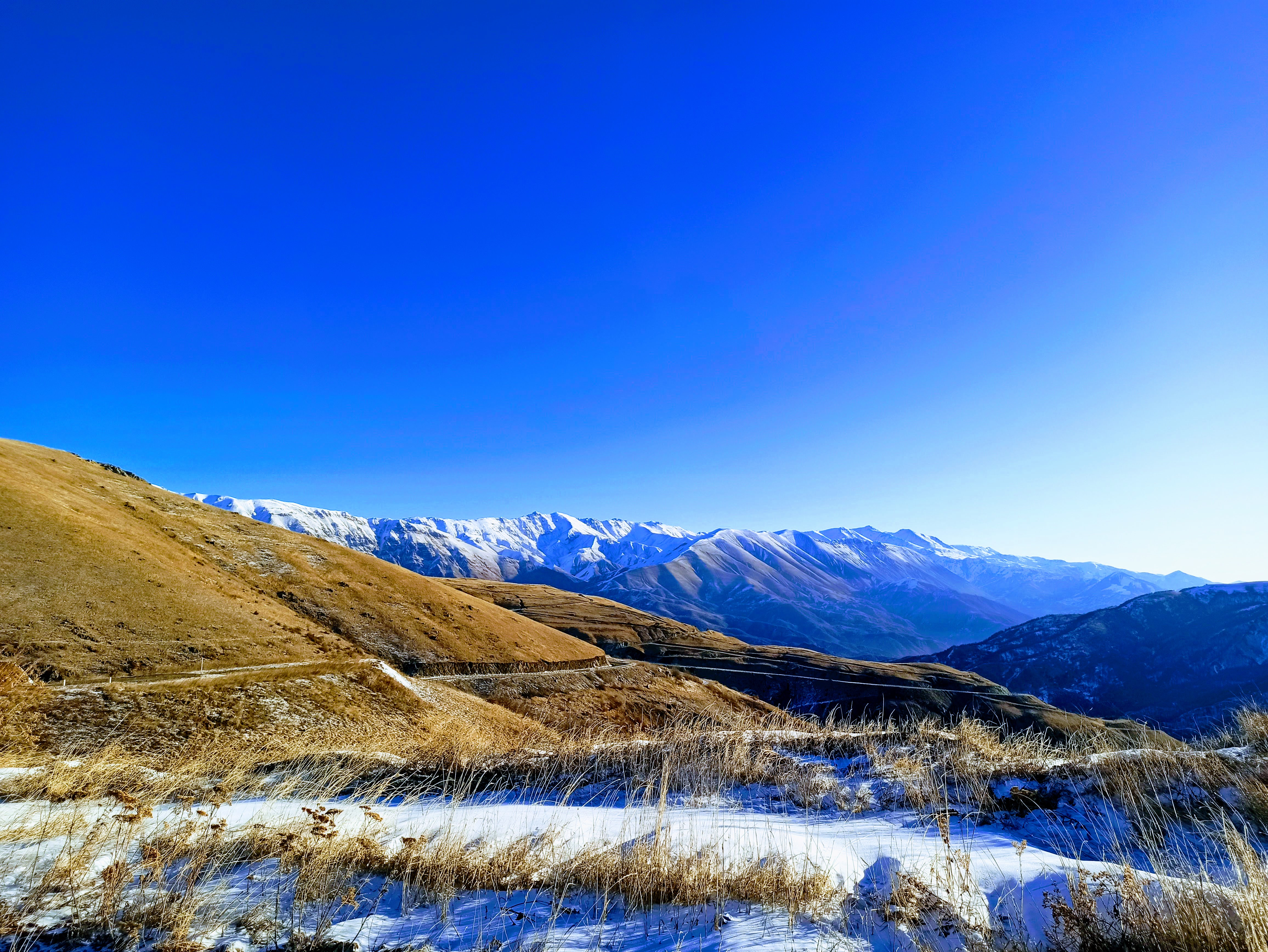
- Mountains around Sotk

- Location within Armenia Location within Gegharkunik
- Coordinates: 40°12′11″N 45°51′53″E
- Country: Armenia
- Province: Gegharkunik
- Municipality: Vardenis
- Founded: 15th century
- Elevation: 2,032 m (6,667 ft)

Population (2011)
  - Total: 824
- Time zone: UTC+4 (AMT)

Sotk (Armenian: Սոթք) is a village in the Vardenis Municipality of the Gegharkunik Province of Armenia, well known for its gold mines.

== Etymology ==
According to J. Markwart and N. Adonts, the name Sotk may be connected to the name of a tribe called Tsavde (atsvots) mentioned in ancient Armenian sources, while others connect it with the toponym Suta (or Shuta) of the Hittite sources (the presence of the Hittites was proposed in the vicinity of Lake Sevan in 2009). According to the 13th century Armenian historian, Stepanos Orbelian, the town and its respective canton were named after the cold and stormy weather.

== History ==
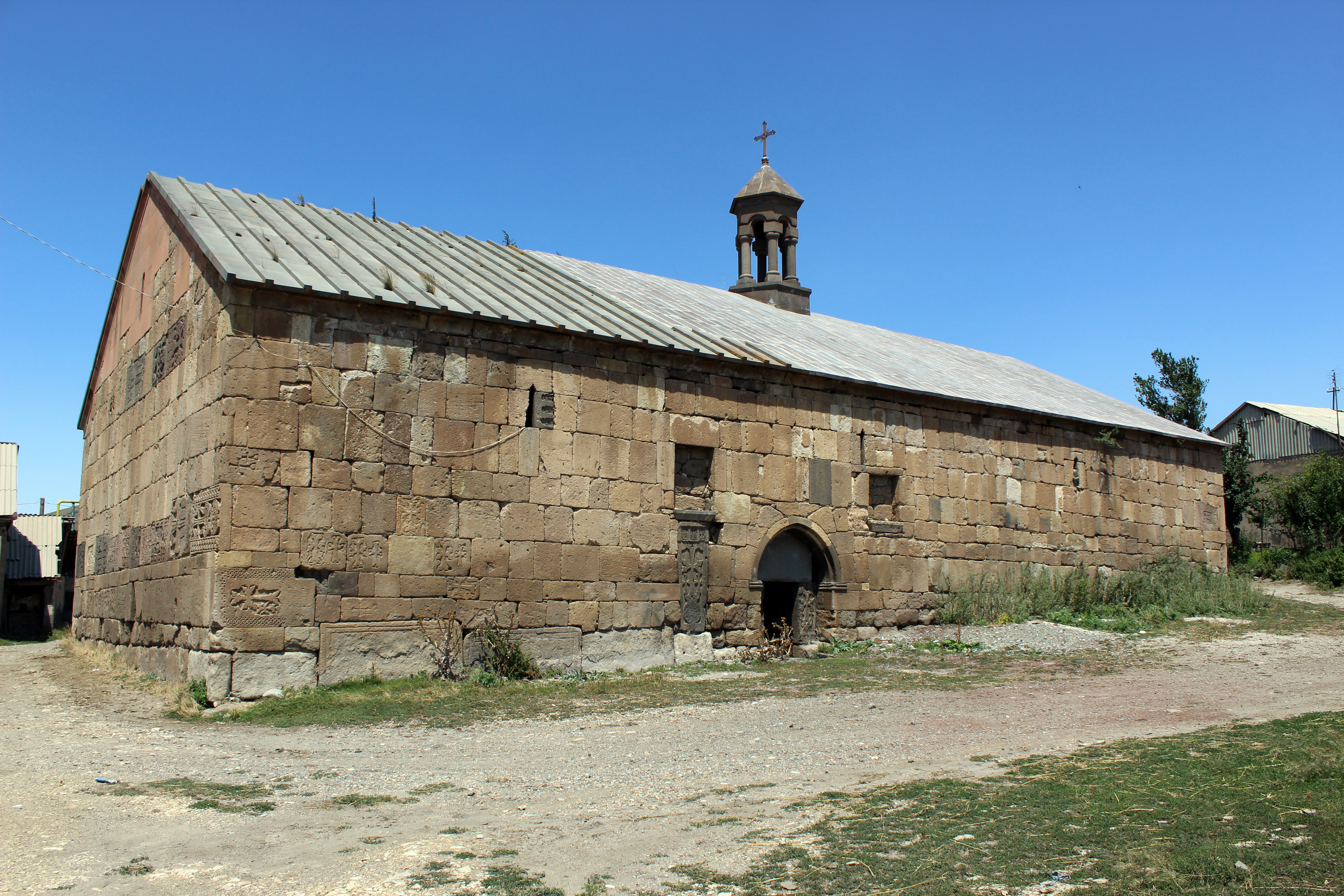
7th century St. Astvatsatsin Church in Sotk

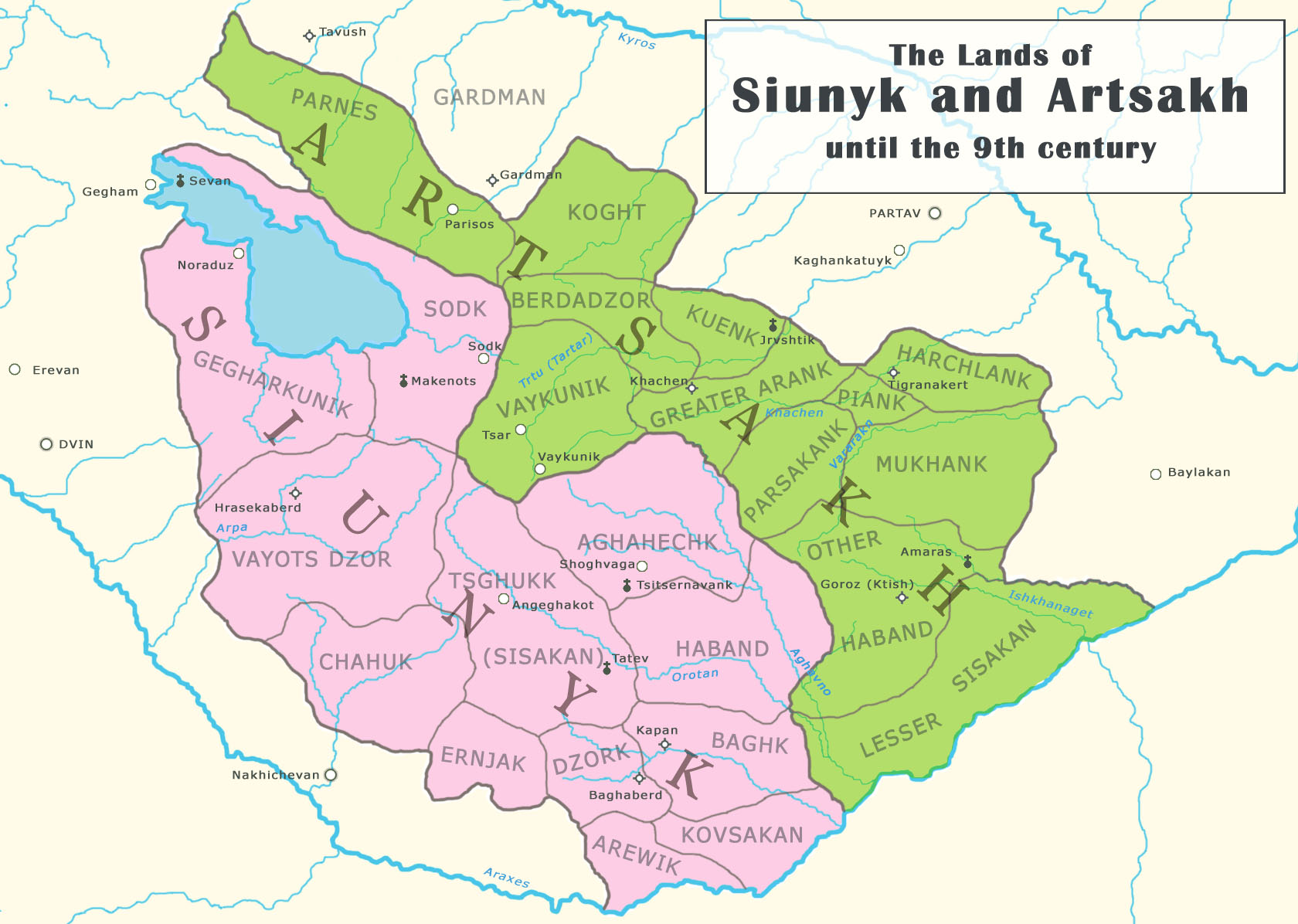
Map of Syunik (pink) in the 9th century

Sotk has been well known for its mines throughout its history. The mines may have been exploited as early as the 2nd millennium BC, evidenced by the discovery of pits, funnels covered with grass, underground workings, wooden tools, stone mortars, washing pots, and more. The mines were used with interruptions until the 14th century AD, and later rediscovered in the 20th century.

=== Bronze Age ===
Materials, cemeteries, weapons, bones, and everyday life objects, belonging to the early Bronze Age, have been found in complexes of settlements around the Sotk mountain pass. During this time, gold may have been acquired by alluvial way, while real mining may have begun in the later Bronze Age.

On the southern slope of the mine, ruins of a large ancient settlement are visible, from where a grass-covered path led to the mine (in 1954, this path would be turned into a road for miners). The river valley is covered by artificial oval terraces which steep from the side towards the river flow. West of Sotk, around the nearby town of modern Vardenis, are some cyclopean fortresses, with corresponding cemeteries from the 2nd and 1st millennium BC, among which is Tsovak, where there is a cuneiform inscription by Urartian king Sarduri II. To the north is a settlement of the Kura-Araxes culture. Many other such ruins can be found near Sotk such as in Chambarak, indicating the Lake Sevan basin was a significant region, controlled from centers like Ishtikuni (Lchashen) and confederations of chiefdoms, such as the Uduri-Etiuni and Uelikuni (both of which seem to have been Armenian etymologically) mentioned in Urartian sources. Elite tombs in Lchashen were rich with gold, which, according to metallurgical analyses, would have derived from Sotk.

=== Antiquity to Middle Ages ===
At some point during the late Iron Age, the highlands known as "Urartu" became known as "Armenia" (see Urartu § Fall). As the first Armenian political entity expanded eastwards, the regions around Sotk were incorporated as core regions of ancient Armenia.

During Antiquity and the Middle Ages, Sotk was part of Syunik, one of the regions of the ancient and the medieval kingdoms of Armenia, where it served as the capital of the region of the same name. Its location on the mountain pass was at a strategic point on the medieval Dvin-Partav road, connecting the southern and eastern regions of the South Caucasus.

The 7th century St. Astvatsatsin Church, an Armenian basilica church with 13th century khachkars in its walls is located in the village.

=== Late modern period ===
The modern village was only founded in 1829, and its official name was Zod (Armenian: Զոդ). The village had an Azerbaijani-majority population before the exodus of Azerbaijanis from Armenia after the outbreak of the Nagorno-Karabakh conflict. From 1988 and onwards, Armenian refugees from Azerbaijan settled in the village.

In September 2022, Sotk as well as several other Armenian towns, including Vardenis (Gegharkunik Province), Goris (Syunik Province) and Jermuk (Vayots Dzor Province), came under attack by Azerbaijani Armed Forces. Many residential houses were damaged as a result of the shelling; people were displaced from their homes.

== Gold mine ==
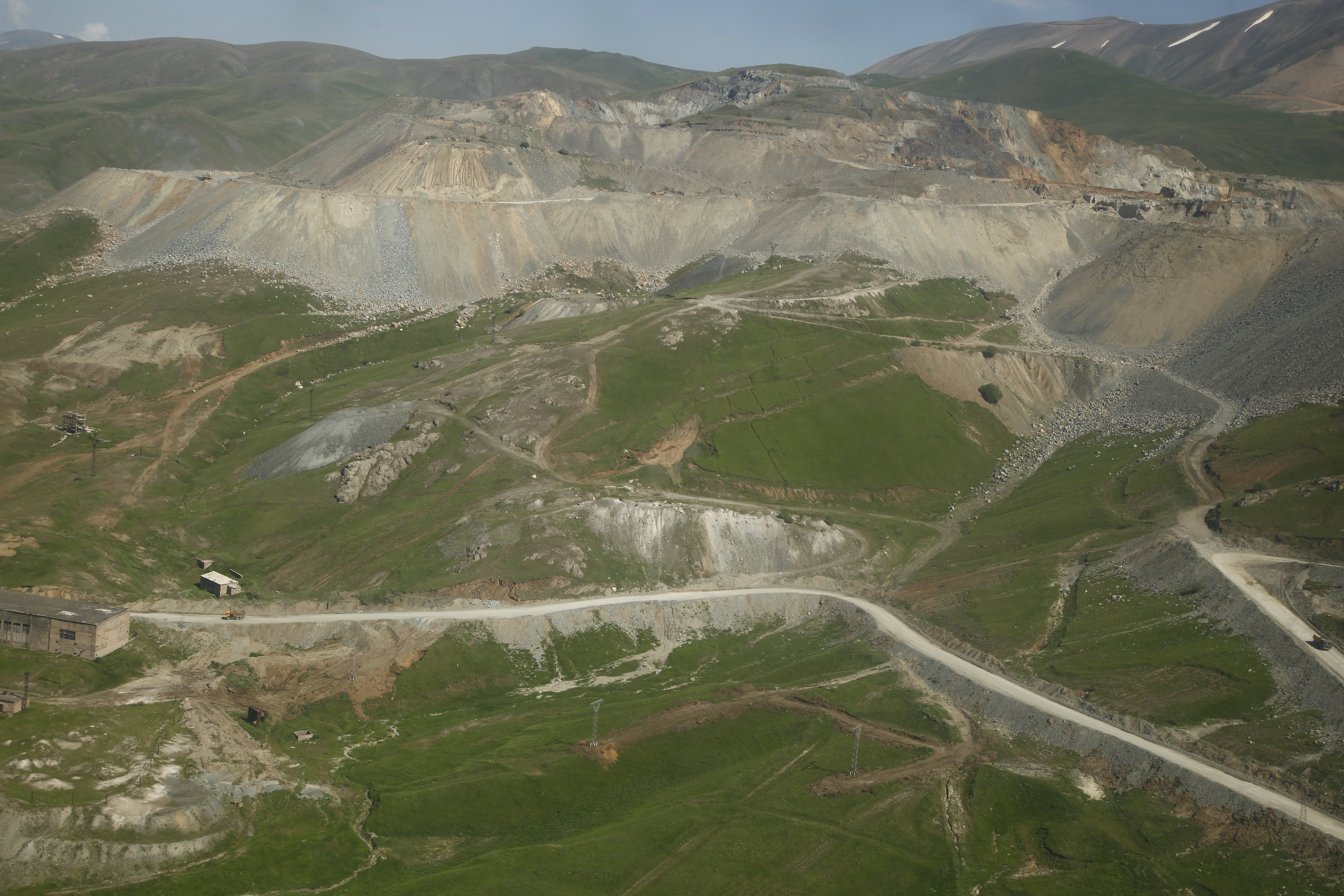
Sotk Gold Mine

A gold mine near the village, called Sotk (Zod), is one of the largest gold deposits in the South Caucasus. It is located on the border of Kalbajar District in Azerbaijan and Gegharkunik Province of Armenia. Kalbajar District was administrated by the breakaway Republic of Artsakh from its control by Armenian forces in 1993 after the Battle of Kalbajar, near the end of the First Nagorno-Karabakh War, until 2020, when the Armenian side handed it over to Azerbaijan according to the ceasefire agreement, ending the 2020 Nagorno-Karabakh war.

Azerbaijani forces entered the district on 25 November, and on 26 November, Armenian media reported that a group of 250 Azerbaijani soldiers had arrived at the gold mine, and demanded its handover, establishing a military post at the mine. The Armenian defense ministry refuted this account, stating that Azerbaijani forces, having found an Armenian border checkpoint unacceptable, contacted the Armenian side via loudspeaker and negotiated with Russian peacekeepers over the issue. Armenian and Azerbaijani authorities started to demarcate the border on the same day. Armenian military authorities then stated that half of the mine area was now in Azerbaijan, given the new border between the two countries.

== Demographics ==
=== Population ===
According to Statistical Committee of Armenia 2011 census, the villages' current population is 824.

== Gallery ==
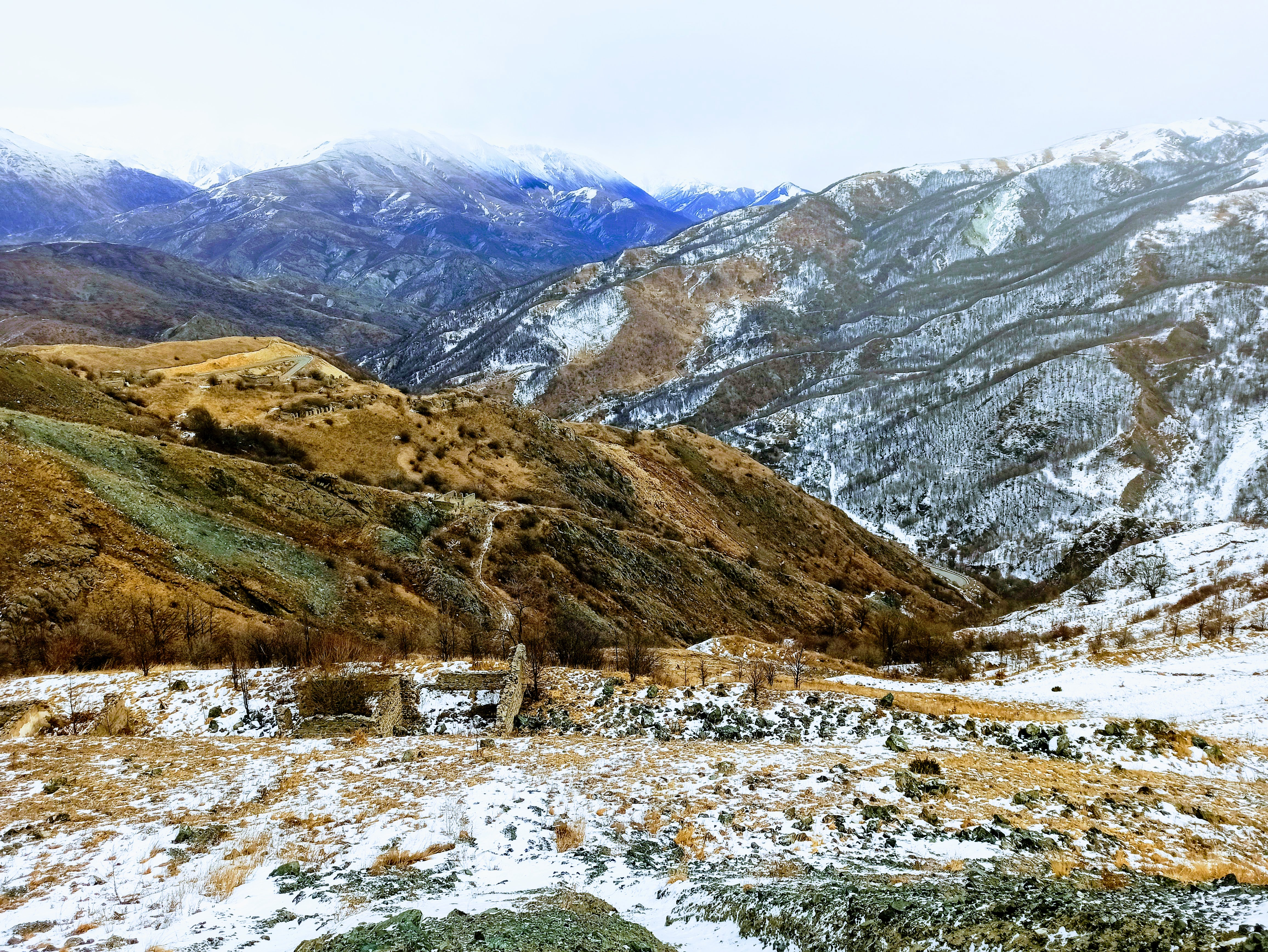
Nature around Sotk

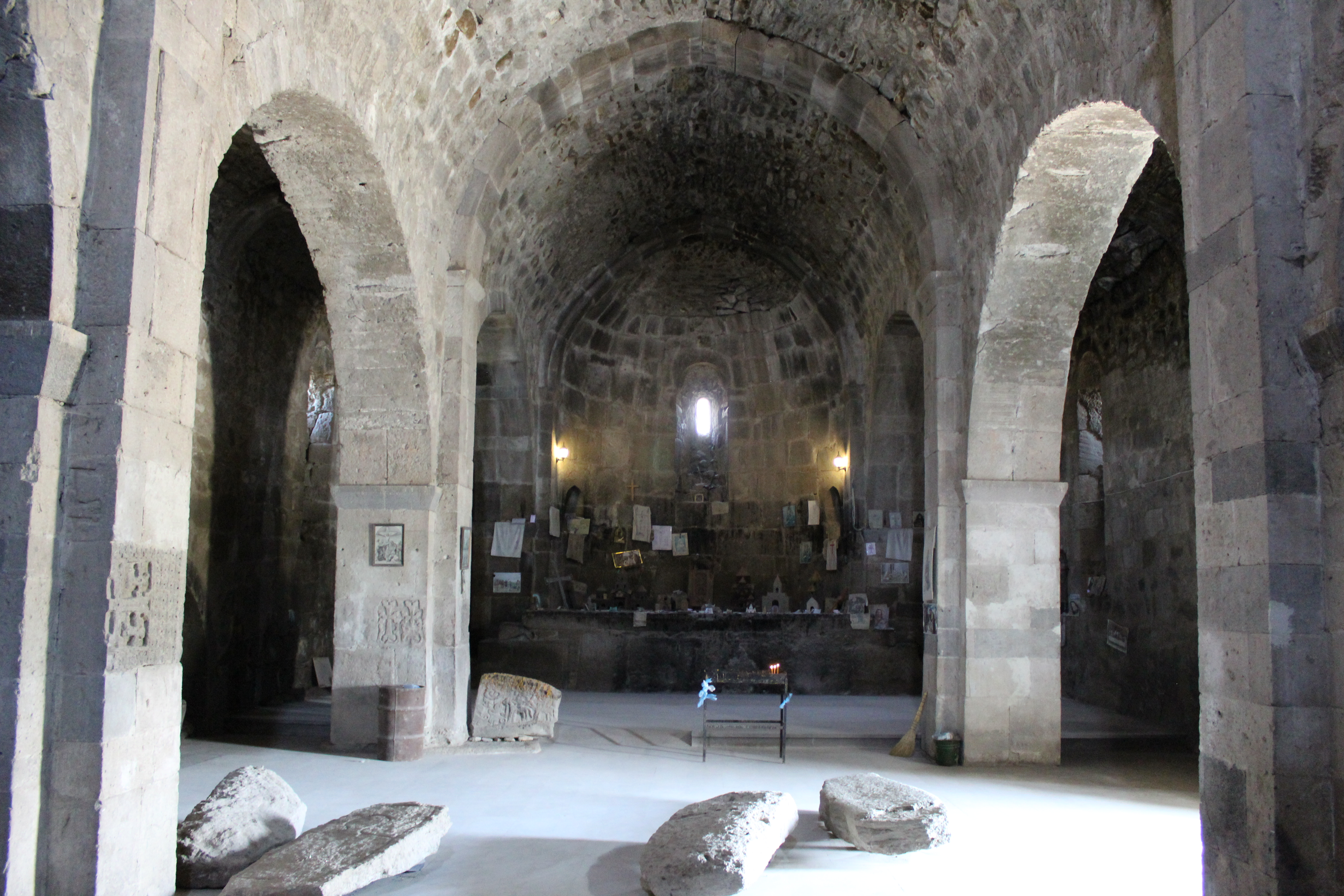
St. Astvatsatsin Armenian Church interior

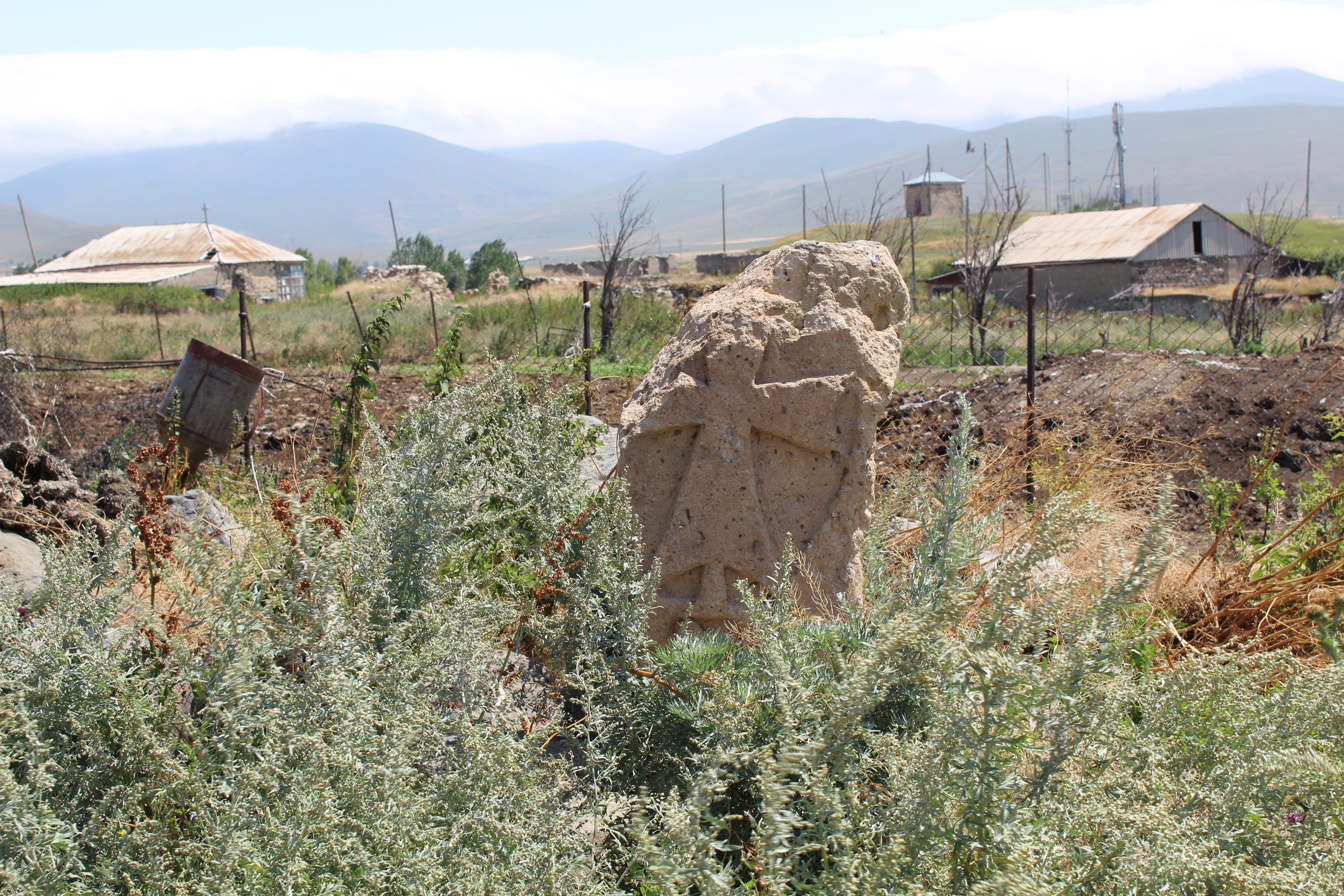
Armenian Khachkar in Sotk

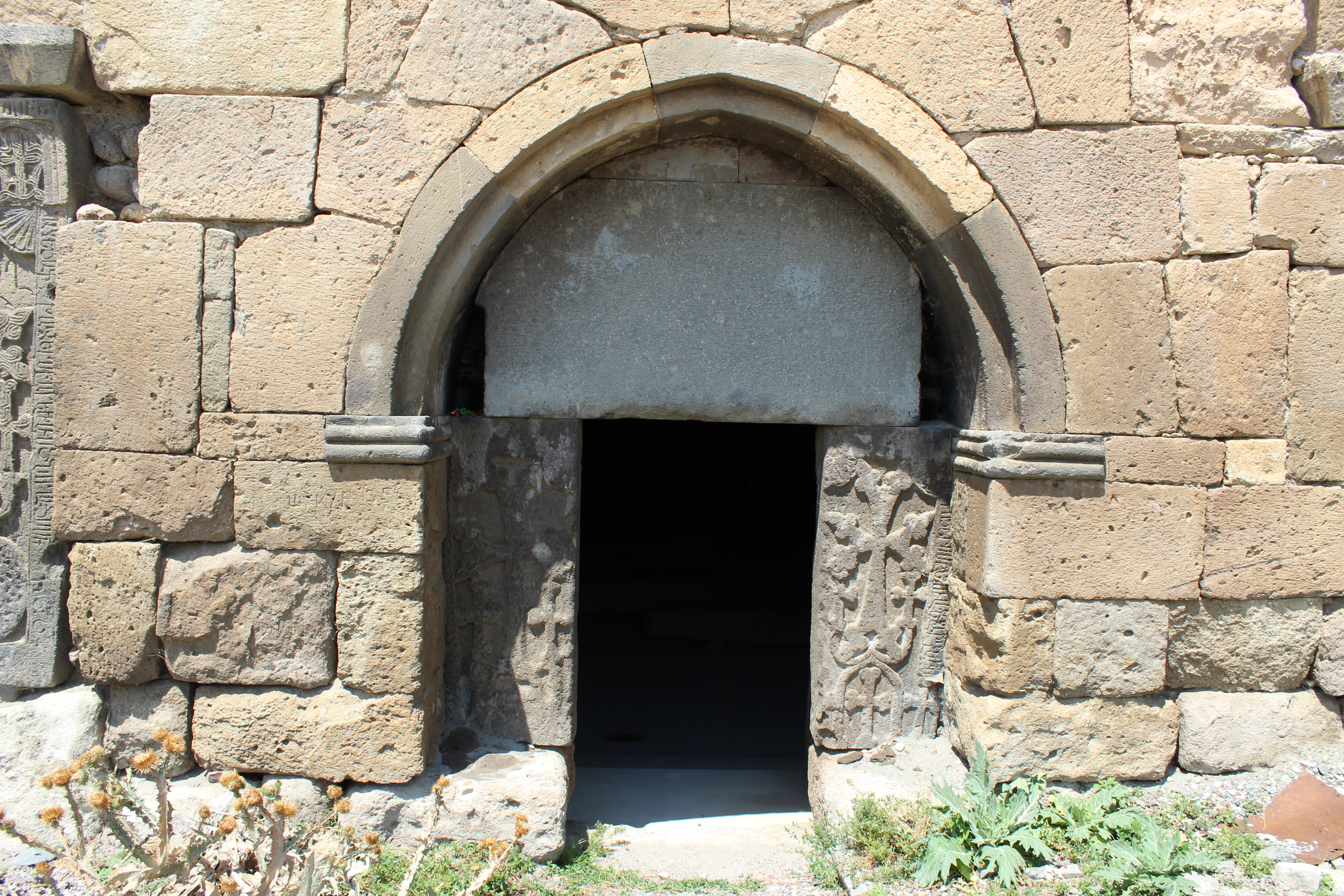
Entrance with khachkars to the St. Astvatsatsin Armenian Church

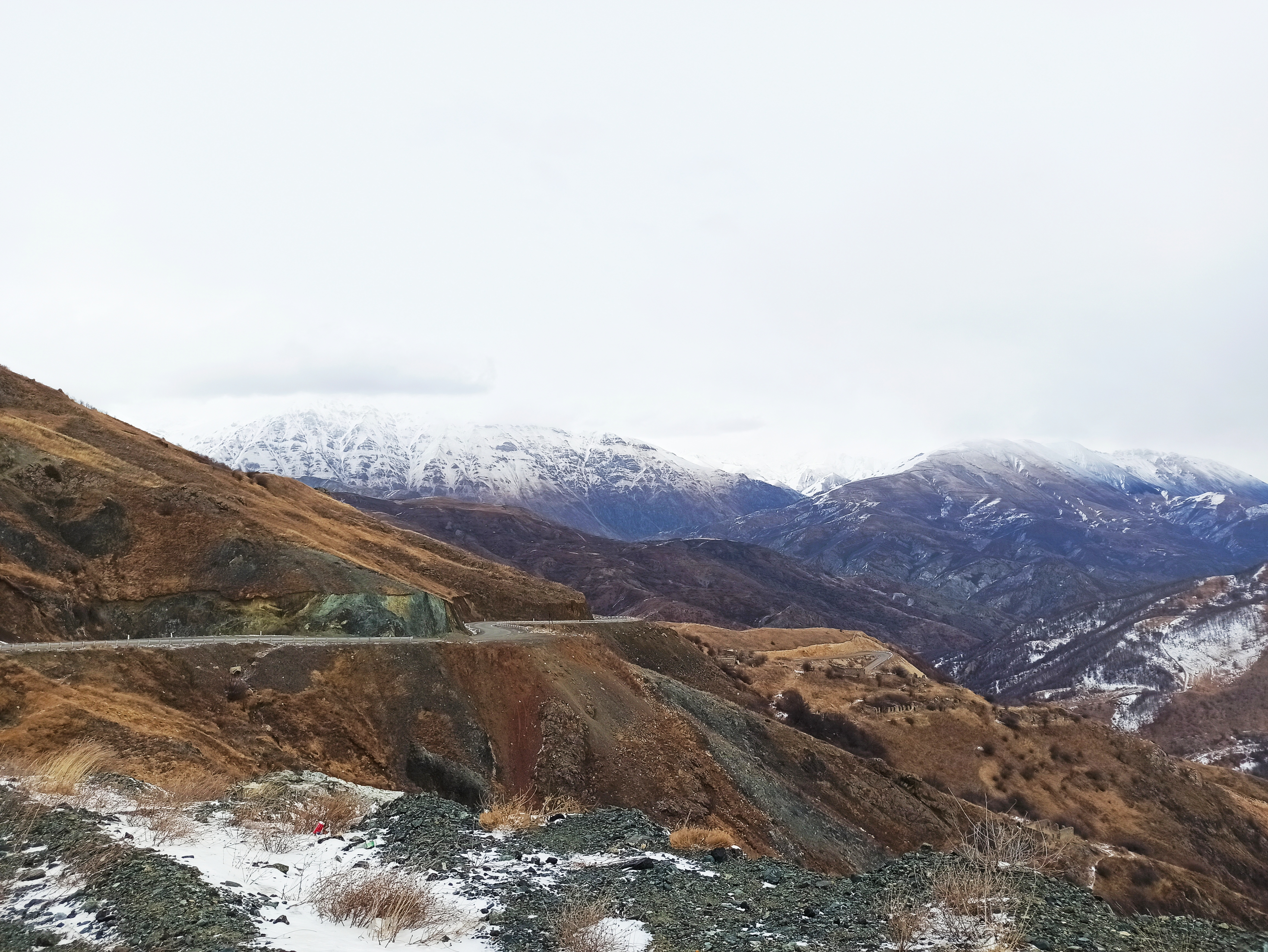
Mountains around Sotk

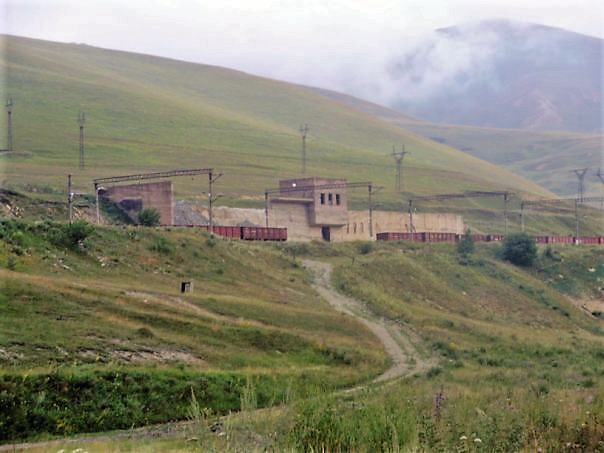
Railroad station in Sotk

== See also ==
- Yeni Zod
