= Şəfəq, Beylagan =

Şəfəq
- Municipality
- Location within Azerbaijan
- Coordinates: 39°47′20″N 47°38′34″E
- Country: Azerbaijan
- Rayon: Beylagan

Population
  - Total: 1,145
- Time zone: UTC+4 (AZT)
  - Summer (DST): UTC+5 (AZT)

Şəfəq (also, Shefek) is a village and municipality in the Beylagan Rayon of Azerbaijan. It has a population of 1,145.
