= Tsvetana Paskaleva =

Armenian-American journalist (born 1960)

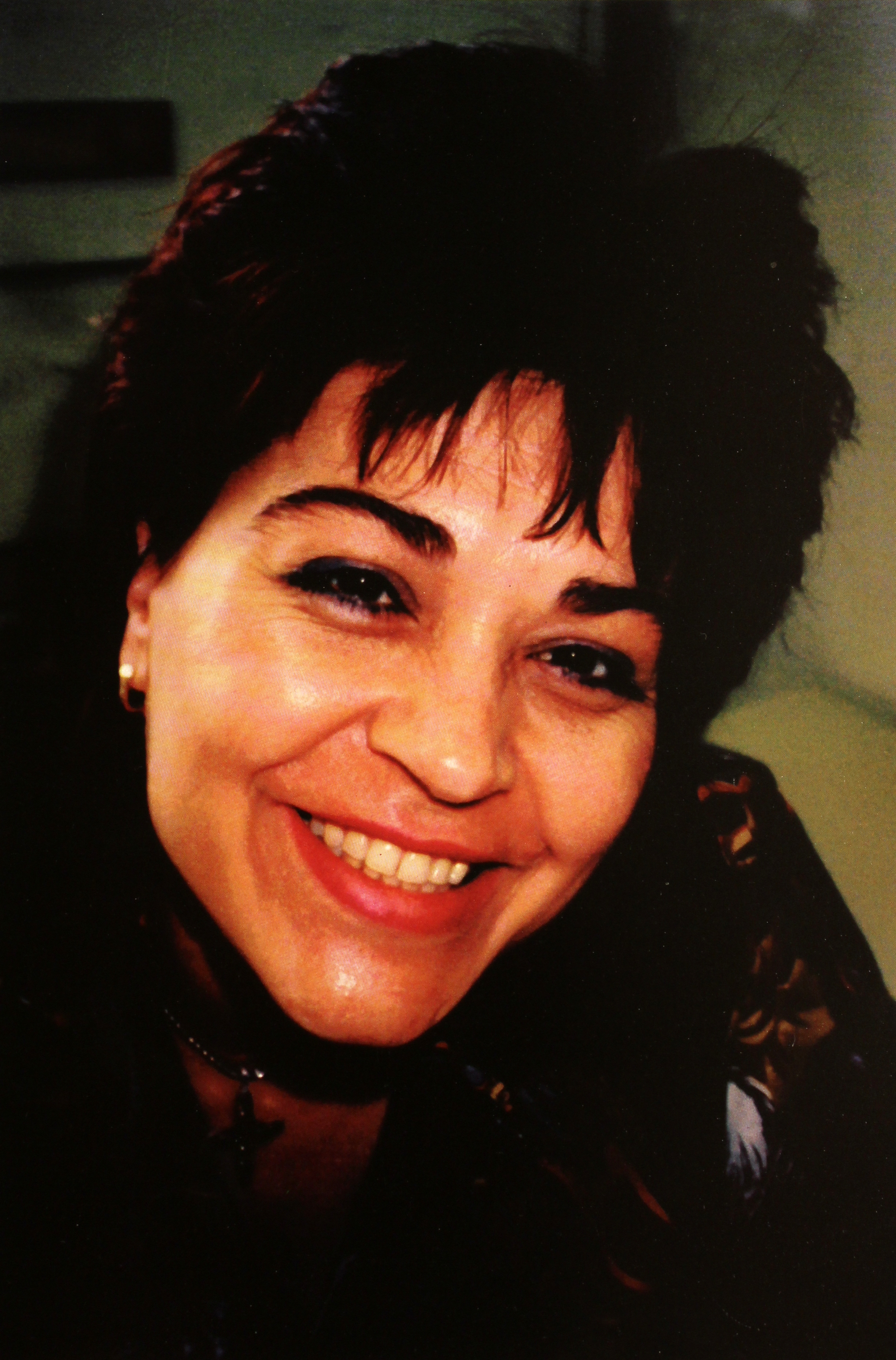
- Tsvetana Paskaleva
- Born: 22 January 1960 (age 66); Nova Zagora, Bulgaria
- Occupations: writer, film director, journalist

Tsvetana Paskaleva (Bulgarian: Цветана Паскалева; Armenian: Ցվետանա Պասկալևա, born 22 January 1960 in Nova Zagora, Bulgaria) is an Armenian-Bulgarian journalist, documentary filmmaker, and a member of the International Documentary Association (Los Angeles). She was awarded the 1994 bronze plaque by the Columbus International Film & Video Festival for her documentary work.

== Biography ==
Paskaleva was born in Bulgaria and graduated from the National Academy for Theatre and Film Arts in Sofia.

Paskaleva was admitted to a PhD program for documentary film directing at VGIK, Moscow and during her studies in 1990, she went to the South Ossetian region of Georgia to shoot a film about a brewing ethnic conflict there. Shortly afterward, she visited Nagorno Karabakh and made a film on the deportations of Armenian residents of Getashen, Martunashen and Shaumyan by Azerbaijani interior forces backed by the regular Soviet Army units. At that time Paskaleva decided to quit her PhD studies in Moscow and stay in Karabakh in order to cover the conflict between Armenians and Azerbaijanis. She was the first foreign journalist to report on the mass deportations against the Armenians by the Azerbaijani special interior forces (OMON) in Goranboy Rayon during the so-called Operation Ring (Rus: Операция Кольцо).

Later when a full-scale war between the Armenians and Azerbaijanis erupted, Paskaleva became a freelance reporter for CNN, NBC, French Antenne 2, and the Reuters Agency, as well as Bulgarian, Russian, and German television, sending reports from the front line. During the first Karabakh war (1991–1994) she made seven documentaries about the war.

In 1993–1994 Paskaleva showed her films to the US Congress, the Parliament of Canada, the UN, Amnesty International, and other organizations; making speeches in defense of the Armenian community of Nagorno-Karabakh.

After the ceasefire was established in Karabakh, Paskaleva settled in Yerevan and devoted her life to the cause of independence of Karabakh. From 1995–2014 she is the author and host of several television programs on the Armenian National TV ("My dears, living and dead" – dedicated to the first Karabakh war, "Tjaragayt", "Aspect" and "Man and people" (Մարդը և մարդիկ) – raising social issues. From 2014 Paskaleva has a series of programs called "The Devotees" (Նվիրյալները) dedicated to the heroes of the first Artsakh war (1991–1994) and the April war (2016), which airs on Armenian satellite TV every weekend.

== Awards ==
Tsvetana Paskaleva received various prizes at several international film festivals. Although Paskaleva had never borne arms and carried only her camera during the war, she received the rank of Karabakh Defense Army Colonel in 1995 and a Medal for Courage from the Armenian Government in 1996. In 2009 she was awarded AGBU's Garbis Papazian Award and decorated with the Movses Khorenatsi Medal, the highest award of Armenia in the fields of science, education, journalism, culture, arts and healthcare.

== Personal life ==
Paskaleva received an Armenian passport on 7 April 2014.

== Films ==
- "Высоты, надежды" (Vysoty, nadezhdy, Heights, hopes, 1991)
- "Будет ли утро над Карабахом" (Budet li utro nad Karabakhom, Will there be a morning over Karabakh, 1992)
- "Дорогие мои, живые и мертвые" (Dorogie moi, zhyvye i mertvye, My dear, alive and dead, 1993),
- "Раны Карабаха" (Rany Karabakha, Wounds of Karabakh, 1994),
- "Солдаты своей земли" (Soldaty swoey zemli, The soldiers of their land, 1994),
- "Затишье" (Zatish'e, Calm, 1995),
- "Вера и дух" (Vera i dukh, Faith and spirit, about the capture of Shushi, 2001)

== Awards ==
- 1994 Annual Columbus International Film & Video Festival's bronze plaque for the "Karabagh's Wounds, I and II"
- Colonel of Artsakh Army and medal "For Bravery"
- 2009 AGBU Garbis Papazian award
