= Yeni Zod =

Yeni Zod Ազատ • Azat
- Location within Azerbaijan
- Coordinates: 40°29′35″N 46°21′01″E
- Country: Azerbaijan
- District: Goygol

Population
  - Total: 1,216
- Time zone: UTC+4 (AZT)

Yeni Zod (Armenian: Ազատ, romanized: Azat) is a village and municipality in the Goygol District of Azerbaijan. The village had an Armenian population before the exodus of Armenians from Azerbaijan after the outbreak of the Nagorno-Karabakh conflict.

In 1989, the village became home to ethnic Azeri refugees from Sotk (Zod) in Armenia. The village became the new municipal seat known as Yeni Zod ("New Zod").

== Toponymy ==
The village was known as Azad until 1999.

== History ==
The village was a part of the Getashen subdistrict which participated in the Artsakh declaration of independence.

== Demographics ==
The village has a population of 1,216.
