= Aşağı Ağcakənd =

Aşağı Ağcakənd Շահումյան • Shahumyan
- Municipality
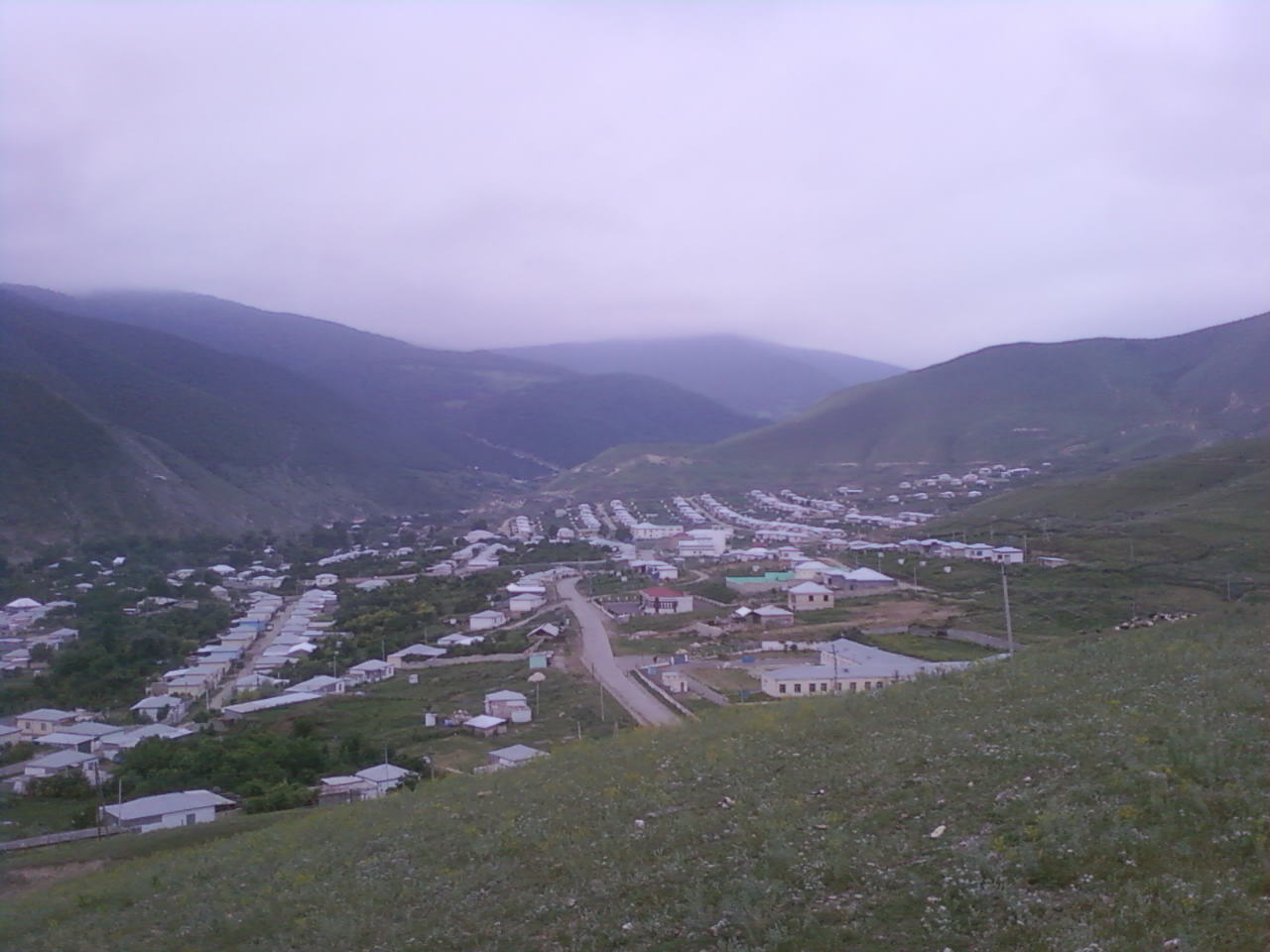

- Location within Azerbaijan
- Coordinates: 40°25′20″N 46°33′36″E
- Country: Azerbaijan
- District: Goranboy

Population
  - Total: 207
- Time zone: UTC+4 (AZT)

Aşağı Ağcakənd (Ashaghy Aghjakend; Armenian: Շահումյան, romanized: Shahumyan) is a village in the Goranboy District of Azerbaijan. The municipality consists of the villages of Aşağı Ağcakənd, Yuxarı Ağcakənd and Meşəli. The village had an Armenian majority prior to the First Nagorno-Karabakh War and Operation Ring.

== Toponymy ==
The village was also previously known as Nerkinshen (Armenian: Ներքինշեն).

== History ==
In antiquity the territory was a part of Artsakh of Greater Armenia; in the Middle Ages it was part of the principality of Khachen; in the 17–18th centuries the territory formed part of Melik-Abovian dynasty's Melikdom of Gulistan, with its capital in the fortress of that name.

During Soviet times, the area was renamed after the Armenian Bolshevik Stepan Shaumian, its administrative center, previously the Armenian village of Nerkishen or Nerkinshen (Nerkin Shen, Ներքին Շեն "lower village") taking the same name.

By the 1990s, the population of Shahumyan district was almost exclusively Armenian, though the area was not included within the boundaries of the Nagorno-Karabakh Autonomous Oblast by the Soviet Union. In the spring-summer of 1991, Soviet president Mikhail Gorbachev ordered the execution of Operation Ring, in which the Soviet Red Army surrounded some of the area's Armenian villages (notably Getashen and Martunashen) and violently deported their inhabitants to the Armenian SSR. Approximately 17,000 Armenians living in Shahumyan's twenty-three villages were expelled from the region.

In December 1991, with the Soviet Union imploding, Shahumyan was claimed by the Republic of Artsakh and became the flashpoint of considerable fighting during the First Nagorno-Karabakh War. This reached a climax in summer 1992, when the Azerbaijani army was able to retain its control over most of the area. Damage was severe and the Armenian population fled. Shaumian was renamed to Aşağı Ağcakənd in 1992, and the town has since been partly re-populated by Azerbaijani refugees and internally displaced persons.

== See also ==
- Shahumyan Province
