= Yuxarı Ağcakənd =

Yuxarı Ağcakənd Վերինշեն • Verinshen
- Location within Azerbaijan
- Coordinates: 40°24′15″N 46°29′38″E
- Country: Azerbaijan
- District: Goranboy
- Municipality: Aşağı Ağcakənd
- Time zone: UTC+4 (AZT)

Yuxarı Ağcakənd (Yukhary Aghjakend; Armenian: Վերինշեն, romanized: Verinshen) is a town in the Goranboy District of Azerbaijan. The town forms part of the municipality of Aşağı Ağcakənd. The village had an Armenian majority prior to the First Nagorno-Karabakh War and Operation Ring.

== Toponymy ==
The village was also previously known as Aghjakend Verin (Armenian: Աղջաքենդ Վերին).
