= Gülüstan, Goranboy =

Gulustan: Գյուլիստան; Gülüstan
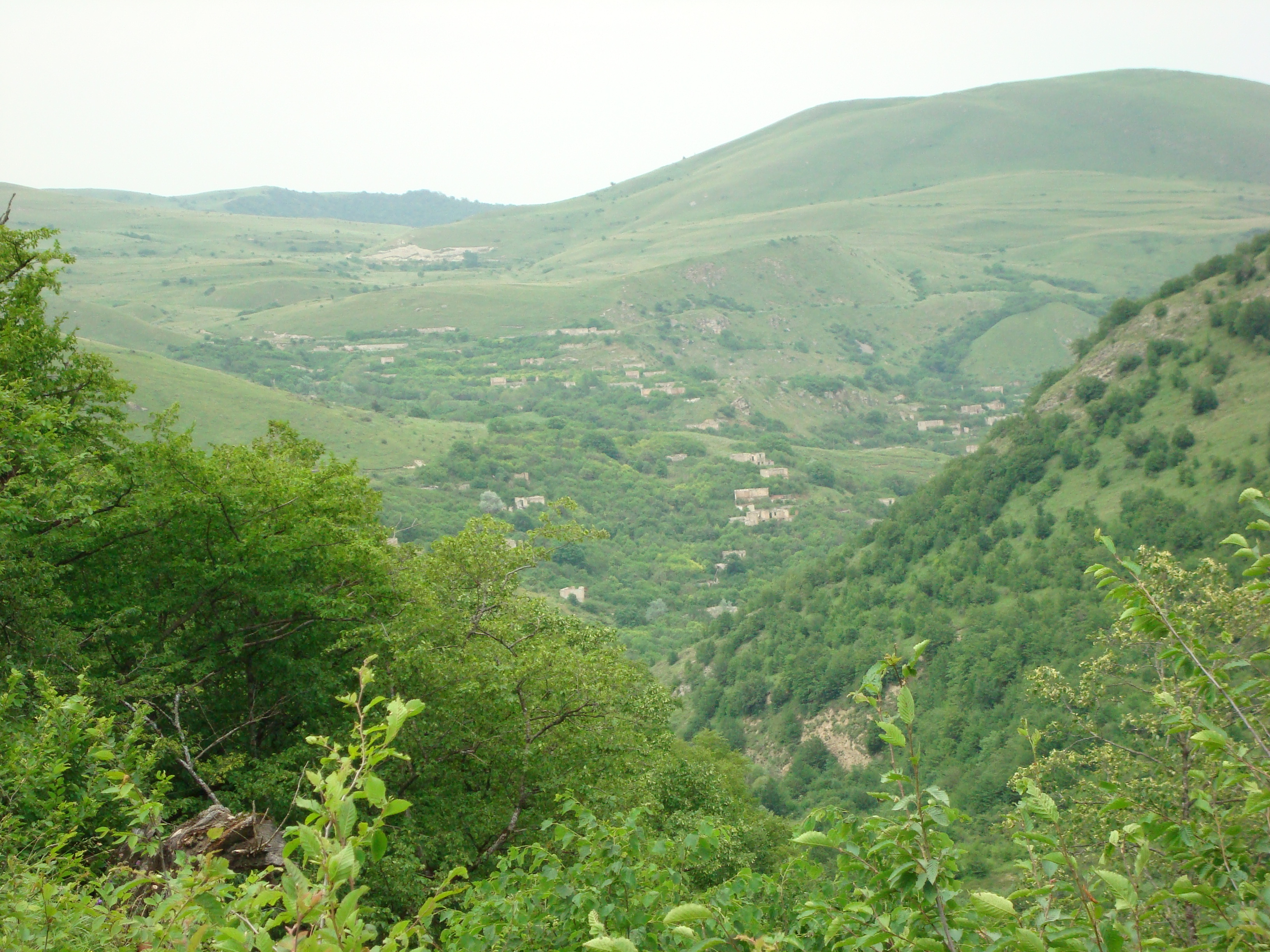

- Location within Azerbaijan
- Coordinates: 40°21′30″N 46°34′43″E
- Country: Azerbaijan
- District: Goranboy
- Municipality: Buzluq
- Time zone: UTC+4 (AZT)

Gülüstan or Gulistan (Armenian: Գյուլիստան, romanized: Gyulistan; ultimately from Persian gulistān 'rose garden') is a village in the Goranboy District of Azerbaijan. It is a part of the municipality of Buzluq.

The village had an Armenian majority prior to the First Nagorno-Karabakh War and Operation Ring. The village is currently uninhabited since Operation Ring.

== Geography ==
The village is located on an elongated hilltop in a forested area on the northern side of the Murov/Mrav mountain range, on the right bank of the Injachay (İncəçay) River.

== History ==
Between the 16th and the 18th century, the fortress of Gulistan (3 km from the village) was one of the seats (the other was Talish) of the Principality of Gulistan ruled by the Armenian Melik Beglarian family, one of the Five Melikdoms of Karabakh. A ruined church dating to 1659 and another newer church were located in the village. A monastery called Surb Amenakp’rkich’ (Holy Savior) was located in the vicinity of the village.

Gülüstan is historically significant as the village near the site where the Treaty of Gulistan was signed between the Russian Empire and Qajar Iran on 12 October 1813, concluding the nine-year-long Russo-Persian War. According to the agreement, Qajar Iran was forced to recognize Russian rule over territories north of Aras river (i.e. the present-day territory of Dagestan, Eastern Georgia, Northern Armenia and most of present-day Azerbaijan without Talysh) with the exception of the Khanates of Erivan and Nakhchivan.

In the Soviet times, the village was part of the Shaumian District, an administrative unit outside the Nagorno-Karabakh Autonomous Oblast with an ethnic Armenian majority. Until 1992, the village was inhabited by ethnic Armenians, who fled when it was captured by Azerbaijani forces during Operation Goranboy. The Shaumian District was then incorporated into the Goranboy District.

On 3 March 1992, an Armenian transport helicopter Mi-26 carrying around 50 women and children from Gülüstan on board was shot down with a MANPADS rocket fired from Azerbaijan-controlled territory, killing 16 people.

Notable natives of the village include Garegin Balayan (1912–1943, Hero of the Soviet Union) and Shahen Meghrian (1952–1993, NKR military commander of Shahumyan region).

== See also ==
- Treaty of Turkmenchay
