= Zeyvə, Goranboy =

Zeyvə
- Municipality
- Location within Azerbaijan
- Coordinates: 40°27′35″N 46°40′59″E
- Country: Azerbaijan
- District: Goranboy

Population
  - Total: 1,759
- Time zone: UTC+4 (AZT)

Zeyvə (Zeyva; Armenian: Զեյվա) is a village and municipality in the Goranboy District of Azerbaijan.
