= Şəfəq, Goranboy =

Şəfəq Shafag
- Municipality
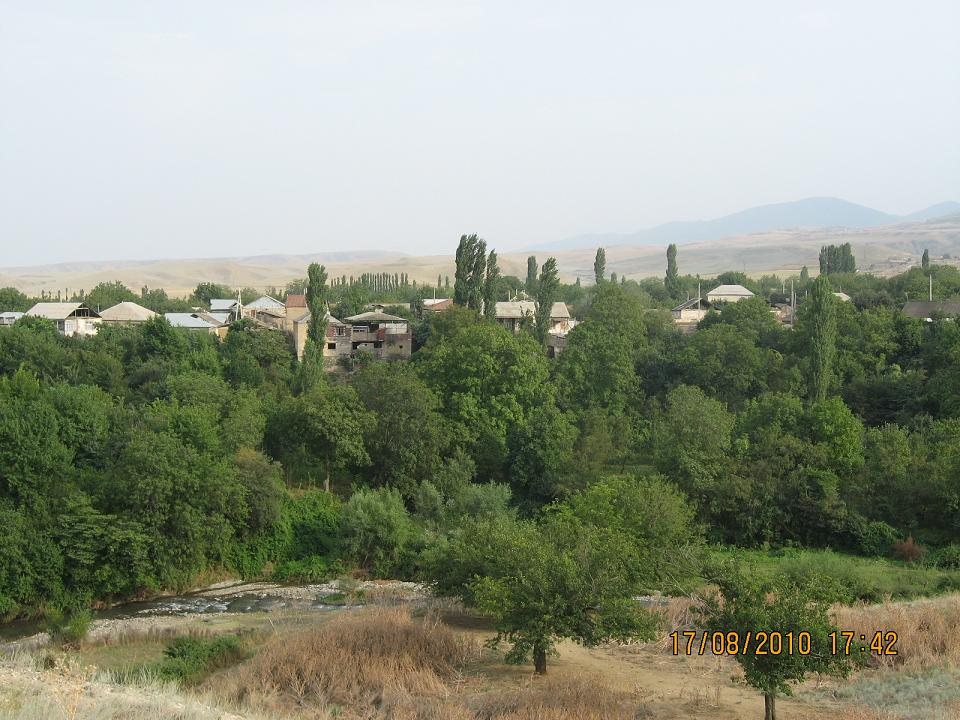

- Location within Azerbaijan
- Coordinates: 40°27′07″N 46°38′32″E
- Country: Azerbaijan
- District: Goranboy

Population
  - Total: 709
- Time zone: UTC+4 (AZT)
- Area code: 22

Şəfəq (Shafag); The former name of the village was Mollavaladli. The settlement was built by families belonging to the mollavaladli (mollaushagi) generation. In 1930, the name of the village was changed and officially called Shafaq. Oykonim reflects faith in "bright" life, future.

The village is located at the foot of the Murovdag mountain range (Lesser Caucasus), at an altitude of 678 meters above sea level. The village had an Azerbaijani majority
