= Kelanlu =

Kelanlu or Këlanlu may refer to:

- Kelanlu, northern Ararat, Armenia
- Kelanlu, southern Ararat, Armenia

== See also ==
- Verin Kelanlu, Armenia
