= Huseyn Najafov =

Huseyn Najafov Hüseyn Nəcəfov

First Secretary of the Nakhchivan Regional Committee of the Communist Party of the Azerbaijan
- In office October 1940 – January 1948
- Preceded by: Kazim Ismayilov
- Succeeded by: Yusif Yusifov

Minister of Forest and Wood Processing Industry of the Azerbaijan SSR
- In office 6 March 1950 – 1951

Minister of Forest Industry of the Azerbaijan SSR
- In office 28 January 1948 – 6 March 1950
- Preceded by: Rza Ismayilov

Personal details
- Born: 1 January 1907 Kolanly, Erivan uezd, Erivan Governorate, Russian Empire
- Died: 16 July 1967 (aged 60) Baku, Azerbaijan SSR, Soviet Union
- Resting place: Alley of Honor
- Party: CPSU
- Awards: Order of Lenin Order of the Red Banner of Labour

Huseyn Hummat oghlu Najafov (Azerbaijani: Hüseyn Hümmət oğlu Nəcəfov, 1 January 1907 – 16 July 1967) was an Azerbaijani party and state figure, First Secretary of the Nakhchivan Regional Committee of the Communist Party of the Azerbaijan (1940–1948), Minister of Forestry and Wood Processing Industry of the Azerbaijan SSR.

== Biography ==
Huseyn Najafov was born in 1907 in Kolanly village of Erivan uezd. He moved to Ganja when he was 19 years old. Here he rose from a worker in a textile factory to the position of chairman of the factory committee.

From 1930 he worked as the secretary of Ganja city Komsomol Committee, the head of the cultural education department of the Central Committee of Azerbaijan Komsomol, the head of the political department in Nakhchivan MTS, the head of the personnel department of Baku city Party Committee. In 1939 he was elected the first secretary of the Youth Union of the Lenin Komsomol of Azerbaijan, in 1940-1948 he worked as the first secretary of the Nakhchivan Regional Committee of the Communist Party of the Azerbaijan. From 1948 he was the Minister of Forest Industry of the Azerbaijan SSR.

Huseyn Najafov graduated from the Higher Party School under the Central Committee of the CPSU in 1937. He was elected a deputy of the Supreme Soviet of the Soviet Union (2nd convocation) and the Supreme Soviet of the Azerbaijan SSR and the Supreme Soviet of the Nakhchivan Autonomous Soviet Socialist Republic (2nd convocation).

Huseyn Najafov died in Baku in 1967 and was buried in the Alley of Honor.

== Awards ==
- Order of Lenin (25 February 1946)
- Order of the Patriotic War, 2nd class (1 February 1945)
- Order of the Red Banner of Labour (27 April 1941)
- Order of the Red Star (1945)
- Medal "For the Defence of the Caucasus" (1944)
- Medal "For Valiant Labour in the Great Patriotic War 1941–1945"
