= Aralykh =

Aralykh may refer to:

- Verin Kelanlu, Armenia
- Yerazgavors, Armenia
