= Basqal State Historical and Cultural Reserve =

Reserve in Ismayilli District, Azerbaijan

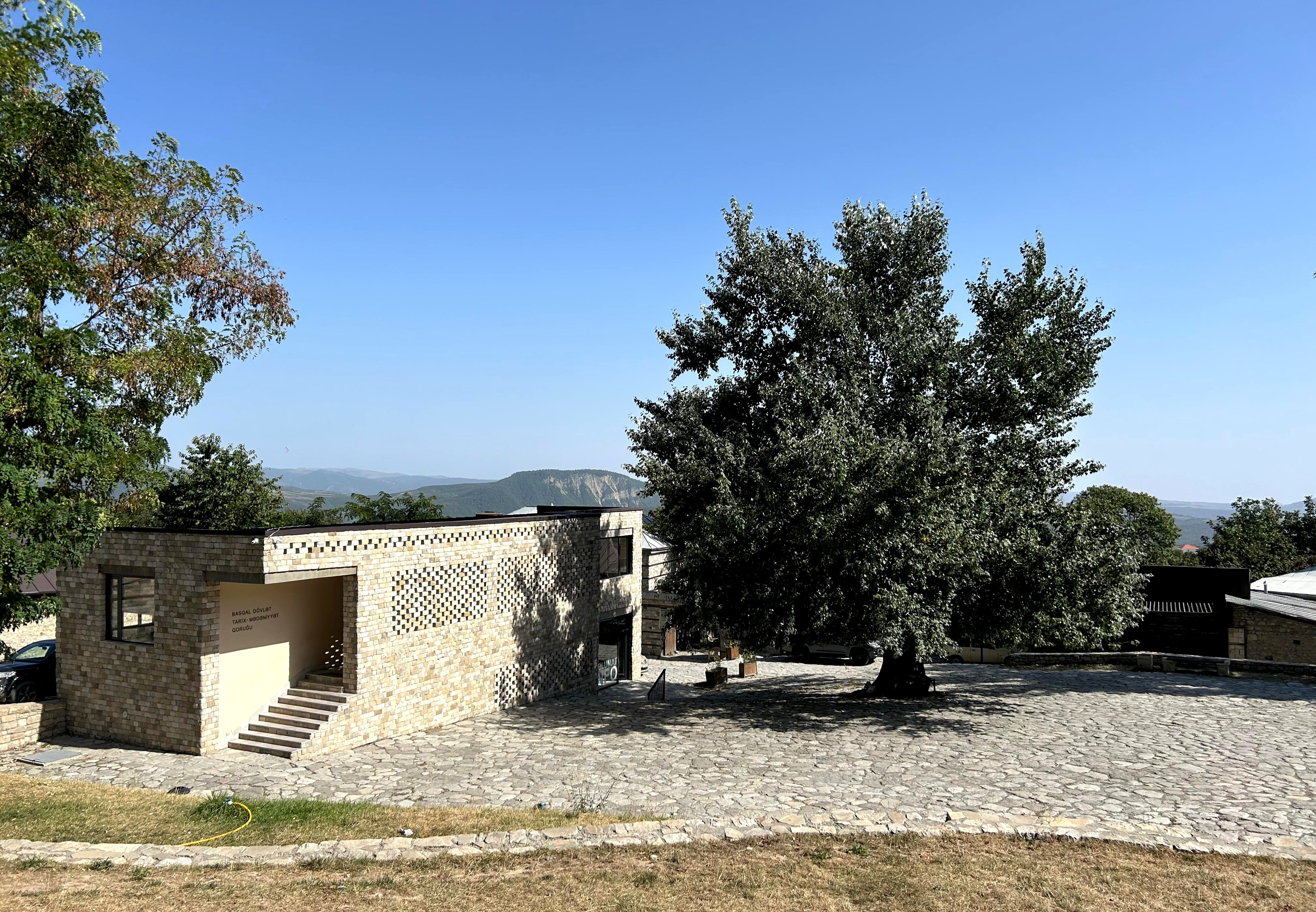
- Location: Basqal,Ismayilli District
- Area: Azerbaijan
- Built: 1989

Basqal State Historical and Cultural Reserve is a historical and cultural reserve located in the settlement of Basqal, Ismayilli District, Azerbaijan.

Several historical monuments and ancient estates are preserved within the territory of the reserve. In addition, a museum also operates here.

== About ==
Basqal State Historical and Cultural Reserve was established in 1989. Its area is 76 hectares.

Within the territory of the reserve are the medieval Basqal Fortress, the historical streets of Goshabulaq, Demirchibazar, Deremahalla, Kharabiyan, Kalakuche, Galibgah, and Chayqiragi, as well as the Bazaar Square. In addition, the Sheikh Muhammad Mosque, the Haji Badal Mosque, the Basqal Bath, and historical estates dating from the 9th to the 19th centuries are preserved here.

The Sheikh Muhammad Mosque, dated to 1531, forms a complex together with the Pir Plane Tree, Pir Spring, and the medieval Kharabiyan Cemetery.

The Basqal Bath, dating from the 16th–17th centuries, has been restored and currently functions as a Bath Museum. The museum's collection contains numerous ancient objects reflecting the traditions of visiting and bathing in the bathhouse.

== See also ==
- Administration of the State Historical-Architectural Reserve "Icherisheher"
