= Basgal Castle =

Medieval fortress in Azerbaijan

- Basqal qalası (Azerbaijani)
- Interactive map of Basgal Castle
- Location: Azerbaijan

History
- Built: Middle Ages

Site notes
- Area: Basqal

Basgal Castle is a medieval fortress located in the Basgal settlement of Azerbaijan. It is considered the largest fortress discovered in Azerbaijan in terms of its area and the length of its walls.

In October 2019, the Basgal archaeological expedition of the Institute of Archaeology and Ethnography of the Azerbaijan National Academy of Sciences conducted excavations in the area. They uncovered fortress walls, a stone-paved sidewalk, a kiln, fortress towers, and the Western Gate of the fortress.

== Description ==
There are various opinions regarding the origin of the "Basgal" toponym. According to academician Ziya Bunyadov, "Basgal" is a Turkic word meaning "top of the fortress," "build a fortress," "create a fortress," "raise a fortress," or "main fortress." Some researchers suggest that the toponym "Basgal" originates from the word "Pəsqala" (meaning "hidden fortress"). In the "Qalabaşı" neighborhood of Basgal, fortress walls several meters thick remain standing to this day, and it is believed that these walls were constructed in the 14th century. Additionally, there is an area called "Qalalar" in the southwest of Basgal.

In the 1960s, archaeologist Fazil Osmanov conducted exploratory work in the area known as "Qalalar" and reported that the findings from the site were chronologically linked to the ancient and early medieval periods. In the 1970s, the area was plowed to a depth of 70–80 centimeters and a vineyard was established there. At various times, during agricultural activities, some artifacts were discovered in the area, including pottery and coins. In 1989, the Basgal State Historical and Cultural Reserve was established in the Basgal area. Within the reserve, historical monuments such as Basgal Fortress, Sheikh Muhammad Mosque, Haji Badal Mosque, and the Basgal Bathhouse, along with historical estates, are preserved.

== Archaeological excavations ==
According to the Presidential Decree of the Republic of Azerbaijan dated October 3, 2018, titled "On the Basgal State Historical and Cultural Reserve," initial archaeological research was initiated in October 2019 by the Basgal archaeological expedition of the Institute of Archaeology and Ethnography of the National Academy of Sciences of Azerbaijan, under the order of the State Tourism Agency. Initially, exploratory excavations were conducted in seven locations. On the southwestern side of the area, a fortress wall measuring 25 meters in length, 1.7 meters in thickness, and more than 2 meters in height in the well-preserved section was discovered. The fortress wall was constructed using partially hewn stone blocks and mud mortar. Subsequent test excavations along the western edges of the area revealed additional sections of the fortress, including a wall 8 meters long and 1.7 meters wide, a stone-paved sidewalk, a kiln, fortress towers, and the western gate of the fortress. Preliminary investigations of the "Qalalar" area indicate that the fortress covered an area of 35–40 hectares, with the total length of its walls reaching nearly 3,500 meters. Based on this information, Basgal Fortress is considered the largest known fortress in Azerbaijan by area.

Inside the fortress walls of the monument, test excavations were carried out in four locations. In one of these excavations, at a depth of 1.5 meters, a 3.5-meter-long kiln remnant was discovered. The kiln was constructed from wide, flat stones, with its top, bottom, and sides laid with stone masonry. Its slope indicates that it was directed outward from the "Qalalar" area. It is believed that there may have once been a bathhouse in this location, and the kiln was likely built to discharge wastewater from the bathhouse into the ravine to the west of the area.

== See also ==
- Shabaran
