= List of leaders of the Nakhchivan Autonomous Republic =

The following is a list of leaders of the Nakhchivan Autonomous Republic

== Heads of the Nakhichevan ASSR ==
=== The leaders of the regional committee of the Communist Party of the Nakhichevan ASSR ===
#	Name	Photo	Term in office	Party affiliation
First Secretaries of the Nakhichevan edge committee of the CP(b) of the Azerbaijan SSR
1	Alasgar Shahbazov		1925–1926	Communist Party
First Secretaries of the Nakhichevan regional committee of the CP of the Azerbaijan SSR
	Hasan Rahmanov		1926–1937	Communist Party
	Kazim Ismayilov		1938–1940	Communist Party
	Huseyn Najafov		1940–1948	Communist Party
	Yusif Yusifov		1949–	Communist Party
	Pasha Aliyev			Communist Party
	Ismail Askerov		1952–1956	Communist Party
	Khurshud Mammadov		1956–1961	Communist Party
	Haji Ibrahimov		1961–1970	Communist Party
	Aslan Huseynov		1970–1975	Communist Party
	Kamran Rahimov		1975–1983	Communist Party
	Nuradin Mustafayev		1983 – November 1988	Communist Party
	Heydar Isayev		November 1988 – January 1990	Communist Party
	Afiyaddin Dzhalilov		January 1990 – April 1991	Communist Party
	Akbar Aliyev		April 1991 – August 1991	Communist Party

=== The leaders of the higher authorities of the Nakhichevan ASSR ===
#	Name	Photo	Term in office	Party affiliation
Chairmans of the Central Executive Committee of the Nakhichevan ASSR
1	Baba Babayev		1926–1937	Communist Party
	Saftar Jafarov		1937–1937	Communist Party
	Mammad Rahimov		1937–1938	Communist Party
Chairmen of the Presidium of the Supreme Soviet of the Nakhichevan ASSR
	Mammad Rahimov		July 1938 – 1940	Communist Party
	Jabrayil Mammadov		1949–	Communist Party
	Huseyn Mammadov		1952–1964	Communist Party
	Sakina Aliyeva		1964–1990	Communist Party
	Afiyaddin Dzhalilov		April 1990 – November 1990	Communist Party

== Leaders of the Nakhchivan Autonomous Republic ==
#	Name	Photo	Term in office	Party affiliation
Chairmen of the Supreme Majlis of the Nakhchivan Autonomous Republic
1	Afiyaddin Dzhalilov		November 1990 – April 1991	
2	Akbar Aliyev		April 1991 – September 1991	
3	Heydar Aliyev		September 5, 1991 – June 23, 1993	New Azerbaijan Party
Chairmen of the Ali Majlis of the Nakhchivan Autonomous Republic
1	Vasif Talibov		since July 3, 1993	New Azerbaijan Party

== See also ==
- List of leaders of Azerbaijan
