= Yerazgavors =

Yerazgavors may refer to:

- Shirakavan (ancient city), an ancient city and one of the historic capitals of Armenia formerly known as Yerazgavors
- Yerazgavors, Armenia, a village in the Shirak Province of Armenia
