= Kazim Ismayilov =

Azerbaijani politician

Kazim Ismayilov Kazım İsmayılov
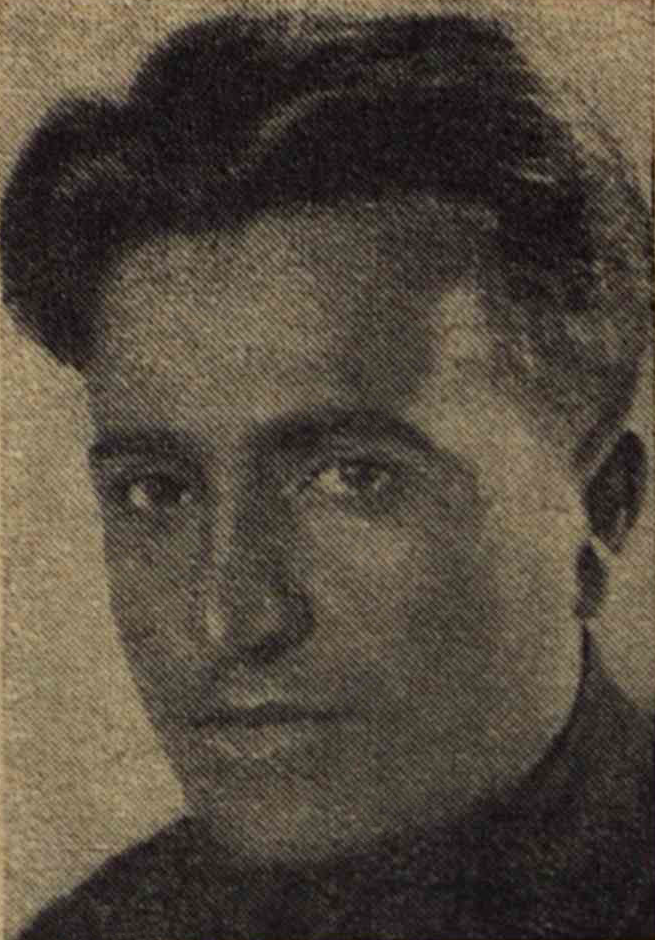

First Secretary of the Nakhchivan Regional Committee of the Communist Party of the Azerbaijan
- In office 1938 – October 1940
- Preceded by: Ibrahim Nazarov
- Succeeded by: Huseyn Najafov

First Secretary of the Salyan District Party Committee

First Secretary of the Agdash District Party Committee

Personal details
- Born: November 22, 1905 Baskal, Shamakhi Uyezd, Baku Governorate, Russian Empire
- Died: March 21, 1981 (aged 75) Baku, Azerbaijan SSR, Soviet Union
- Party: CPSU
- Children: Tofig Ismayilov
- Awards: Order of Lenin Order of the Badge of Honour Order of the Red Banner of Labour

Kazim Mirheydar oghlu Ismayilov (Azerbaijani: Kazım Mirheydər oğlu İsmayılov; November 22, 1905 — March 21, 1981) was a Soviet political figure, First Secretary of the Nakhchivan Regional Committee of the Communist Party of the Azerbaijan, First Secretary of the Agdash and Salyan District Party Committees.

== Biography ==
Kazim Ismayilov was born on November 22, 1905, in Baskal settlement. In 1922 he volunteered for the army. After his discharge from the army in 1924, K. Ismayilov worked as an assistant locksmith in mechanical workshops in Baku. In the following years he became the second secretary of the Central Committee of the Komsomol of Azerbaijan and the first secretary of the Nakhchivan regional party committee.

From the first days of the Great Patriotic War, Kazim Ismayilov joined the fighting army, was the chief of the political department of the 402nd, 72nd, 378th and 39th Rifle Divisions, and took part in the clashes with the Germans. After his discharge from the army in 1945, Kazim Ismayilov returned to party work - first secretary of the Agdash and Salyan district party committees, head of the department of administrative bodies of the Azerbaijan Communist Party. He was a deputy of the Supreme Soviet of the USSR, the Supreme Soviet of Azerbaijan, the Supreme Soviet of the Nakhchivan Autonomous Republic.

Kazim Ismayilov died on March 21, 1981. He was the father of the First Secretary of State of the Republic of Azerbaijan Tofig Ismayilov.

== Awards ==
- Order of Lenin (2 times) — April 27, 1940
- Order of the Badge of Honour
- Order of the Red Banner of Labour
- Order of the Patriotic War (1st and 2nd class)

== Literature ==
- Филиппов С. Территориальные руководители ВКП(б) в 1934—1939 гг. Справочник. — Москва, РОССПЭН, 2016.
