= Nakhichevan Regional Committee of the Azerbaijan Communist Party =

The First Secretary of the Nakhichevan regional branch of the Azerbaijan Communist Party was the position of highest authority in the Nakhichevan ASSR in the Azerbaijan SSR of the Soviet Union. The position was created in 1920, and abolished in August 1991. The First Secretary was a de facto appointed position usually by the Central Committee the Azerbaijan Communist Party or the First Secretary of the Republic.

== List of First Secretaries of the Communist Party of Nakhichevan ==
Name	Term of Office		Life years
Name	Start	End	Life years
First Secretaries of the Communist Party
?	1920	1921	
Bagatur Velibekov	1921	1921	1894–1938
?	1921	1925	
Alesker Shakhbazov	1925	?	1888–1973
Ali Dzharov	?	?	
Vasily Volkov	1929	1929	1889–1939
?	1929	1933	
Bagatur Velibekov	?	1933	1894–1938
Ali Mamedov	1933	1933	
Mekhti Mekhtiyev	1935?	December 1936	?–1937
Gasan Rakhmanov	?	1937	
Kyazim Ismailov	1938?	1940	
Huseyn Nadzhafov	1940	1949	
Yusif Yusifov	1949	1952?	
Pasha Aliev	1952	1952	
Ismail Askerov	1952	1956	1914–
Khurshud Mamedov	1956	1961	1906–?
Gadzhi Ibragimov	October 1961	April 1970	1923–
Aslan Guseynov	April 1970	December 1975	1916–
Kamran Ragimov	December 1975	December 1983	1928–
Nuradin Mustafayev	December 1983	November 1988	1942–
Heidar Isayev	November 1988	January 1990	1936–
Afetdin Dzhalilov	January 1990	April 1991	1946–1994
Akper Aliyev	April 1989	August 1991	1950–

== See also ==
- Nakhichevan Autonomous Soviet Socialist Republic
- List of leaders of the Nakhchivan Autonomous Republic

== Sources ==
- World Statesmen.org
