= Haji Badal Mosque =

Mosque in Basqal, Azerbaijan

- Azerbaijani: Hacı Bədəl; Arabic: مسجد حاجي بادال (باسكال)
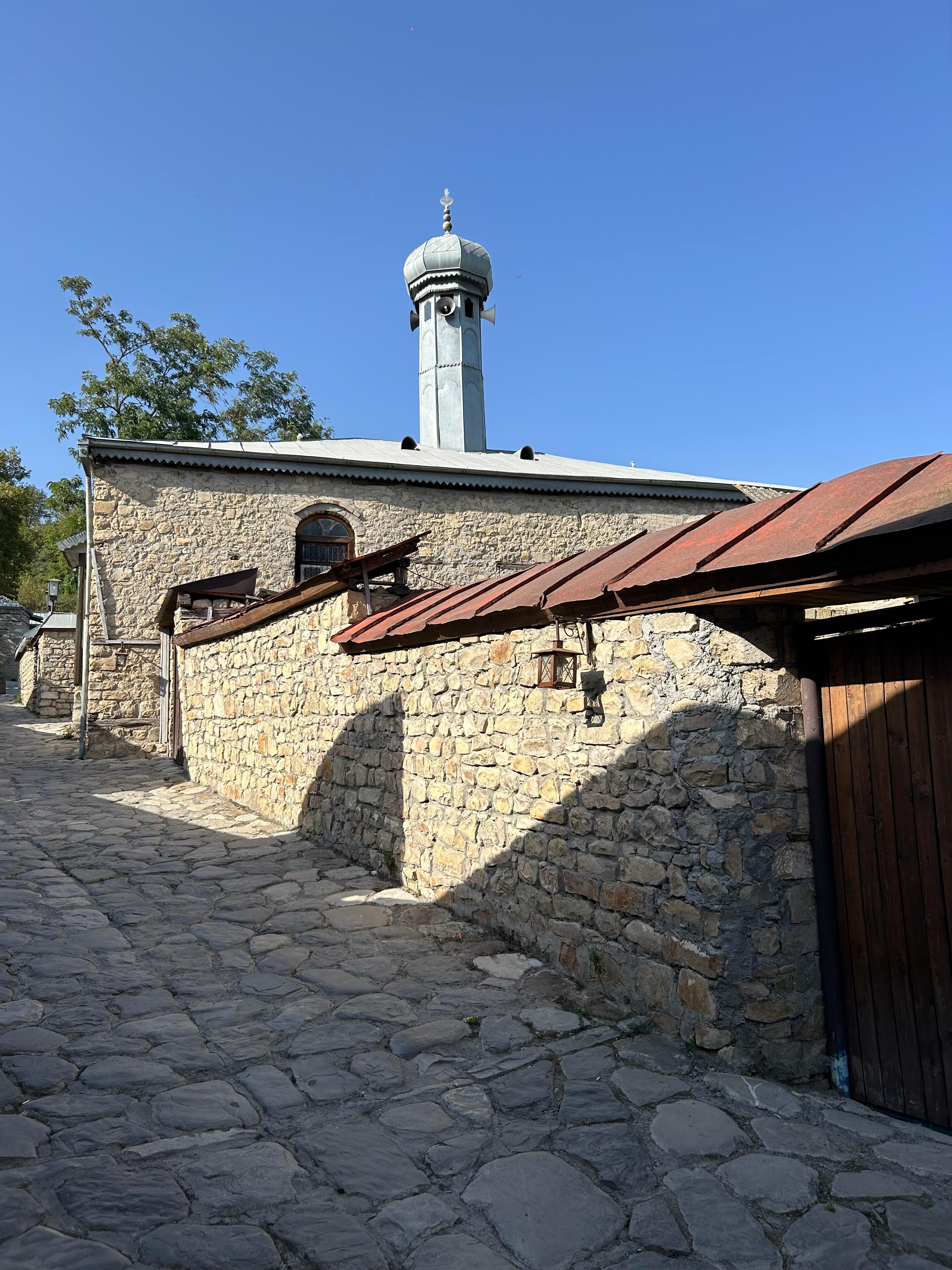
- The mosque in 2024

- Location of the mosque in Azerbaijan

Religion
- Affiliation: Islam
- Ecclesiastical or organisational status: Mosque (1854–1928); Profane use (1930s–1985); Mosque (since 1991)
- Status: Active

Location
- Location: Demirchibazar, Basqal
- Country: Azerbaijan
- Coordinates: 40°45′20″N 48°23′26″E

Architecture
- Type: Mosque architecture
- Style: Islamic
- Completed: 1848

Specifications
- Capacity: 200 worshipers
- Dome: One
- Dome height (outer): 4 m (13 ft)
- Minaret: One
- Materials: Wood; stone; iron

The Haji Badal Mosque (Azerbaijani: Hacı Bədəl; Arabic: مسجد حاجي بادال (باسكال)) is a mosque and historical architectural monument, located in the "Basqal" State Historical-Cultural Reserve in Azerbaijan. Completed in 1854, the mosque was included in the list of local importance immovable historical and cultural monuments by the 132nd decision of the Cabinet of Ministers of the Republic of Azerbaijan on August 2, 2001.

== History ==
The Haji Badal Mosque was built in 1854 in the Demirchibazar neighborhood of the Basqal settlement. The mosque was commissioned by Haji Badal Mashadi agha oghlu. Haji Badal, from the Goshabulaq neighborhood of Basqal, constructed the mosque in honor of his daughter, Sitarə. The construction work was supervised by builders Allahi and Mashadi Sattar.

The mosque's courtyard also contains a mausoleum that contains the remains of Seyid Ümbülbanu, who was descended from Imam Jafar al-Sadiq (a.s). The inscription on the mausoleum's entrance indicates that Seyid Ümbülbanu lived from 1855 to 1898 and was buried in the mausoleum.

In Azerbaijan, after the Soviet occupation, the fight against religion officially began in 1928. In December of that year, the Central Committee of the Azerbaijan Communist Party transferred many mosques, churches, and synagogues to the balance of clubs for educational purposes. While there were 3,000 mosques in Azerbaijan in 1917, this number decreased to 1,700 in 1927, 1,369 in 1928, and only 17 in 1933. The Haji Badal Mosque was also closed for worship during this period. Initially, weaving looms were installed in the building, and it functioned as a silk workshop. After World War II, the building was used as a warehouse for the Rural Consumer Society. In 1985, major restoration work was carried out on the mosque. The decaying ceiling, mosque floor, and the courtyard's stone covering were renewed. In 1989, the "Basqal" State Historical-Cultural Reserve was established in the area including the mosque.

After Azerbaijan restored its independence in 1991, the mosque was reopened for worship. It was included in the list of local importance immovable historical and cultural monuments by the 132nd decision of the Cabinet of Ministers of the Republic of Azerbaijan on August 2, 2001.

== Architecture ==
The mosque's ceiling is made of wood, and the floor is made of stone. The roof is covered with iron sheets. Inside the mosque, there are two arched and six rectangular windows. The prayer hall is divided into two sections, one for women and one for men. The women's section is located on a wooden balcony in the main hall. The prayer hall can accommodate 200 people. The pulpit is made of wood. The mihrab is decorated with various patterns by Basqal calligraphers. The mihrab also features the name "Ali" written in Arabic multiple times on a dove figure. This inscription, combined with a mirror effect, forms the name "Muhammad." The mosque has one dome and one minaret. The height of the dome is 4 m (13 ft).

== See also ==
- Islam in Azerbaijan
- List of mosques in Azerbaijan
