= Sheikh Muhammad Mosque =

Former mosque in Basqal, Azerbaijan

- Azerbaijani: Şeyx Məhəmməd Məscidi
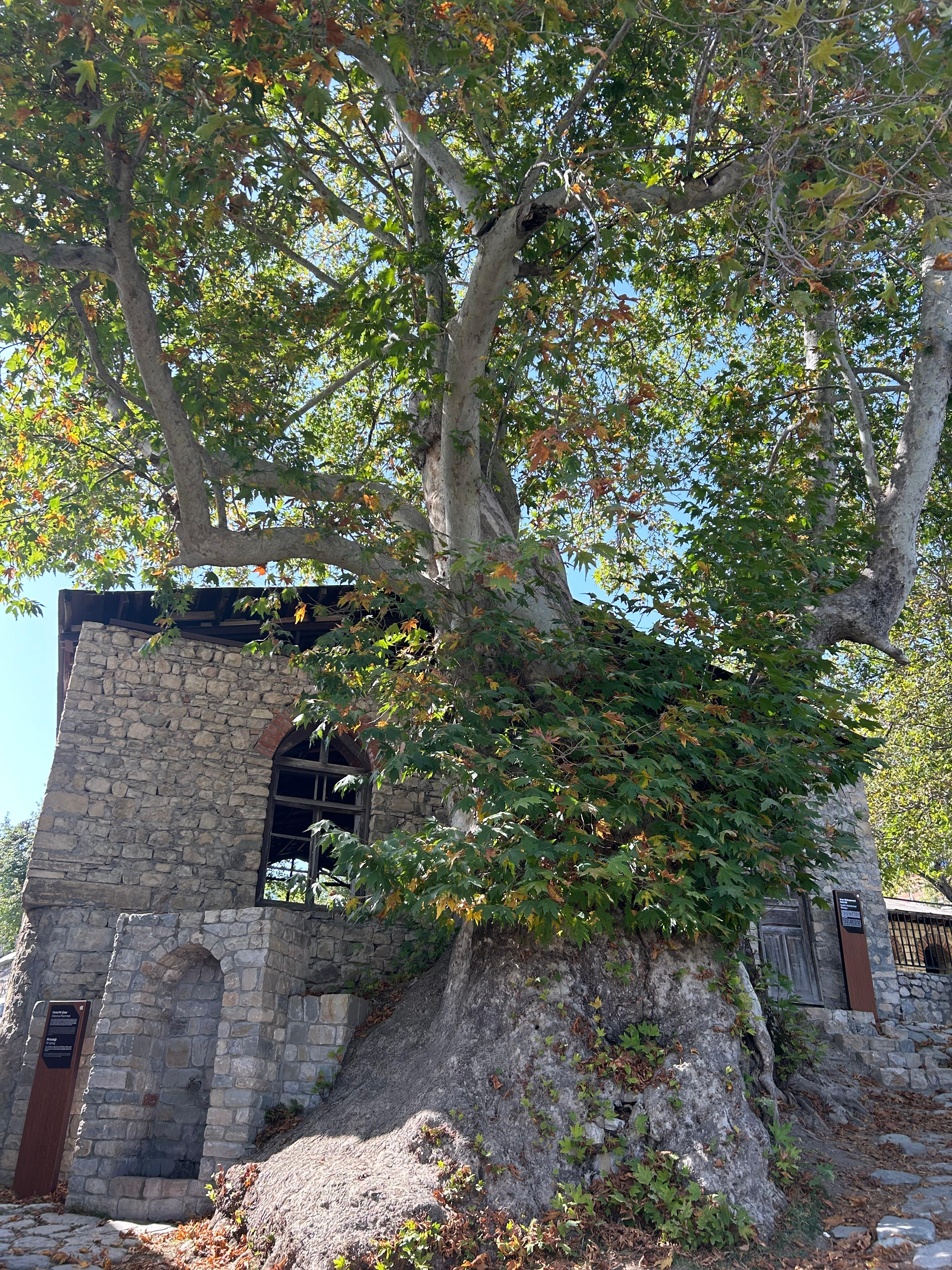
- The former mosque in 2024

- Location of the former mosque in Azerbaijan

Religion
- Affiliation: Islam (former)
- Ecclesiastical or organizational status: Mosque (1531–1928); Profane use (1928–1991)
- Status: Abandoned (ruinous state)

Location
- Location: Basqal, Ismayilli District
- Country: Azerbaijan
- Interactive map of Sheikh Muhammad Mosque
- Coordinates: 40°45′22″N 48°23′24″E

Architecture
- Type: Mosque architecture
- Style: Islamic
- Completed: 1531
- Minaret: Two (since destroyed)
- Inscriptions: 20 (maybe more)

The Sheikh Muhammad Mosque (Azerbaijani: Şeyx Məhəmməd Məscidi), is a former mosque and historical architectural monument, located in the Basqal State Historical-Cultural Reserve in the Ismayilli District of Azerbaijan. Completed in 1531, the former mosque has been partially restored.

== About ==
The Sheikh Muhammad Mosque was built in 1531 under the orders of Pir Muhammad, the son of Sufi Dervish Ali. The mosque is located in the Kələküçə neighborhood of Basqal. A madrasa operated in the mosque's courtyard.

After the Soviet occupation in Azerbaijan, the official campaign against religion began in 1928. In December of that year, the Central Committee of the Azerbaijan Communist Party transferred many mosques, churches, and synagogues to the balance of clubs for educational purposes. While there were 3,000 mosques in Azerbaijan in 1917, this number dropped to 1,700 in 1927, 1,369 in 1928, and 17 in 1933.

Sheikh Muhammad Mosque was closed for worship during this period. About twenty stone inscriptions in the mosque's courtyard were destroyed, and the twin minarets were dismantled. The mosque building was repurposed as a club. In 1975, the building was completely destroyed by a fire caused by a short circuit in the electrical network.

In the 1980s, local people carried out restoration work on the mosque. During this work, they discovered an inscription about Pir Çinar, which was planted beside the mosque. The inscription noted that Pir Çinar was planted by Sheikh Safayi in 1568. In 1989, the Basqal State Historical-Cultural Reserve was established in the area including the mosque.

=== Archaeological excavations ===
In 2019, at the request of the State Tourism Agency of the Republic of Azerbaijan, an expedition from the Archaeology and Ethnography Institute of the Azerbaijan National Academy of Sciences, led by Prof. Dr. Qafar Cəbiyev, conducted archaeological research inside and in the courtyard of Sheikh Muhammad Mosque. Inside the former mosque, remains of a smaller, square-shaped mosque in the style of Shirvanshahs period Islamic architecture were uncovered. Several inscriptions were also discovered during the excavation.

== See also ==
- Islam in Azerbaijan
- List of mosques in Azerbaijan
