= Kelanlu, Vedi =

Kelanlu
- Location within Armenia Location within Ararat
- Coordinates: 39°57′22″N 45°03′12″E
- Country: Armenia
- Marz (Province): Ararat
- Time zone: UTC+4 ( )
  - Summer (DST): UTC+5 ( )

Kelanlu (also, Këlanlu, Zhirmanis, and Dzhirmanis) is a town in the Ararat Province of Armenia.

== See also ==
- Ararat Province
