= Kelanlu, Armavir =

Kelanlu
- Location within Armenia
- Coordinates: 40°03′02″N 44°19′58″E
- Country: Armenia
- Marz (Province): Armavir
- Time zone: UTC+4 ( )
  - Summer (DST): UTC+5 ( )

Kelanlu (also known as Kharaba Këlanlu and Këlanlu) is a town in the Armavir Province of Armenia.

== See also ==
- Ararat Province
