= Yusif Yusifov =

- Born: 23 September 1929; Boyuk-Vedi (Azerbaijani: Böyük-Vedi), TSFSR, Soviet Union
- Died: 4 January 1998 (aged 68); Baku, Azerbaijan
- Occupations: Historian, Linguist
- Title: Professor

Yusif Bahlul oglu Yusifov (Azerbaijani: Yusif Bəhlul oğlu Yusifov, Russian: Юси́ф Бахлу́л оглы́ Юси́фов; 23 September 1929 – 4 January 1998) was an Azerbaijani and Soviet historian, linguist, toponymist, orientalist, turkologist and an outstanding authority on ancient languages, including Sumerian and Akkadian.

== Biography ==
Yusifov was born on September 23, 1929, in the city of Boyuk Vedi. After graduating from the Azerbaijan Pedagogical School in Yerevan in 1946, he continued his education at the Leningrad University, where he essentially learned ancient oriental languages (Sumerian, Akkadian, Elamite, Persian). After graduating from the University department of Iranian Philology, in 1952. Yusif Yusifov came back to Azerbaijan in 1952-1953 and began his career at the Institute of History and Philosophy of the Azerbaijan Academy of Sciences. However, interest in the history of the Ancient East and the desire to implement in the research area of knowledge received at LSU, soon attracted young researcher to Leningrad.

In the years 1953-1956, under the leadership of Sumerology and Assyriologist I. M. Dyakonov, Yusif Yusifov continued his education at the postgraduate studies of the State Hermitage, and as a specialization selected one of the least studied in the world historiography - the history of Elam. Two major articles of Yusif Yusifov, devoted to the last period of Elam history, and PhD thesis, defended in 1958, attracted the attention of famous scientists-orientalists, and contributed to his recognition as a scholar-elamist.

Returning home after defending his doctoral dissertation Yusifov until 1967 worked at the Institute of History of Azerbaijan Academy of Sciences. Soon, national, allied and foreign journals had begun to publish his articles relating to the problems of the history of Elam, Media, Assyria and Urartu. In 1965, he completed his doctoral thesis on the socio-economic history of Elam, successfully defended it in Tbilisi.

In 1968, the voluminous monograph of Yusifov, devoted to the socio-economic history of Elam was published in Moscow. In 1967, Yusif Yusifov began his teaching career as a professor of the history of Azerbaijan Pedagogical Institute and from 1971 until the end of his life worked at the Azerbaijan State Pedagogical University, as Head of Department, Dean of the Faculty. In 1993 Yusifov published a book "History of the Ancient East" for higher educational institutions. He is the co-author of several books on history. He died in Baku, on January 4, 1998.

== Final Years and Legacy ==
The latter years of Yusif Yusifov's life were marked by vigorous scientific and teaching activities. He left behind a rich legacy of scholarly works that continue to inspire and guide researchers in the field of Oriental studies. Passing away on January 4, 1998, in Baku, Yusifov left an indelible mark on the history of science in Azerbaijan and the world.

His scientific legacy lives on in his students and followers, who continue to pursue research in the history and culture of the Ancient East. Yusifov is rightfully considered one of the pillars of Azerbaijani historical science and Oriental studies, and his contributions remain relevant and valuable for contemporary research.
