= Yerazgavors, Armenia =

Yerazgavors Երազգավորս
- Location within Armenia Location within Shirak
- Coordinates: 40°42′N 43°46′E
- Country: Armenia
- Province: Shirak
- Municipality: Akhuryan

Area
  - Total: 9.7 km^{2} (3.7 sq mi)
- Elevation: 1,480 m (4,860 ft)

Population (2011)
  - Total: 1,309
- Time zone: UTC+4

Yerazgavors (Armenian: Երազգավորս) is a village in the Akhuryan Municipality of the Shirak Province of Armenia. It is named after the historic name of the ancient city of Shirakavan. The current village of Yerazgavors is located a few kilometres east of the historic city of Shirakavan-Yerazgavors.

== Demographics ==
Historical population
Year	Pop.	±% p.a.
1886	300	—
1897	397	+2.58%
1926	925	+2.96%
1939	1,282	+2.54%
1959	1,070	−0.90%
1970	1,100	+0.25%
1979	1,103	+0.03%
2001	1,489	+1.37%
2011	1,309	−1.28%
