= Verin Kelanlu =

Village in Armavir, Armenia

Արմավիր գյուղ
- Location within Armenia
- Coordinates: 40°07′02″N 44°16′14″E
- Country: Armenia
- Marz (Province): Armavir
- Time zone: UTC+4 ( )
  - Summer (DST): UTC+4 ( )

Armavir gyux (also, Արմավիր գյուղ, Aralykh, Verin Armavir) is a village in the Armavir Province of Armenia.

== Population ==
Year	Population
1831	284
1873	673
1886	701
1897	886
1904	768
1914	887
1918	768
1919	1118
1922	224
1926	248
1931	294
