= Basqal =

Basgal
- Municipality
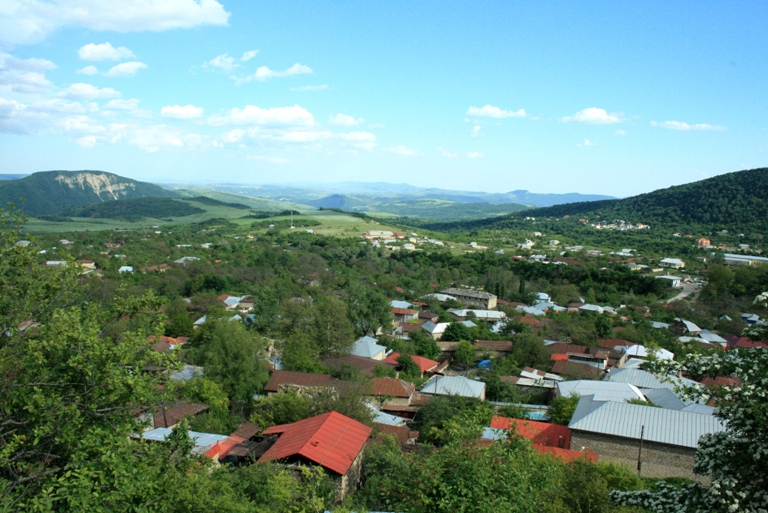

- Location within Azerbaijan
- Coordinates: 40°45′20″N 48°23′47″E
- Country: Azerbaijan
- Rayon: Ismailli

Population (2021)
  - Total: 200
- Time zone: UTC+4 (AZT)
  - Summer (DST): UTC+5 (AZT)

Basgal (also, Azizbekovo, Baskal, and Baskhal) is a settlement and municipality in the Ismailli Rayon of Azerbaijan. It has a population of 200.

== Gallery ==
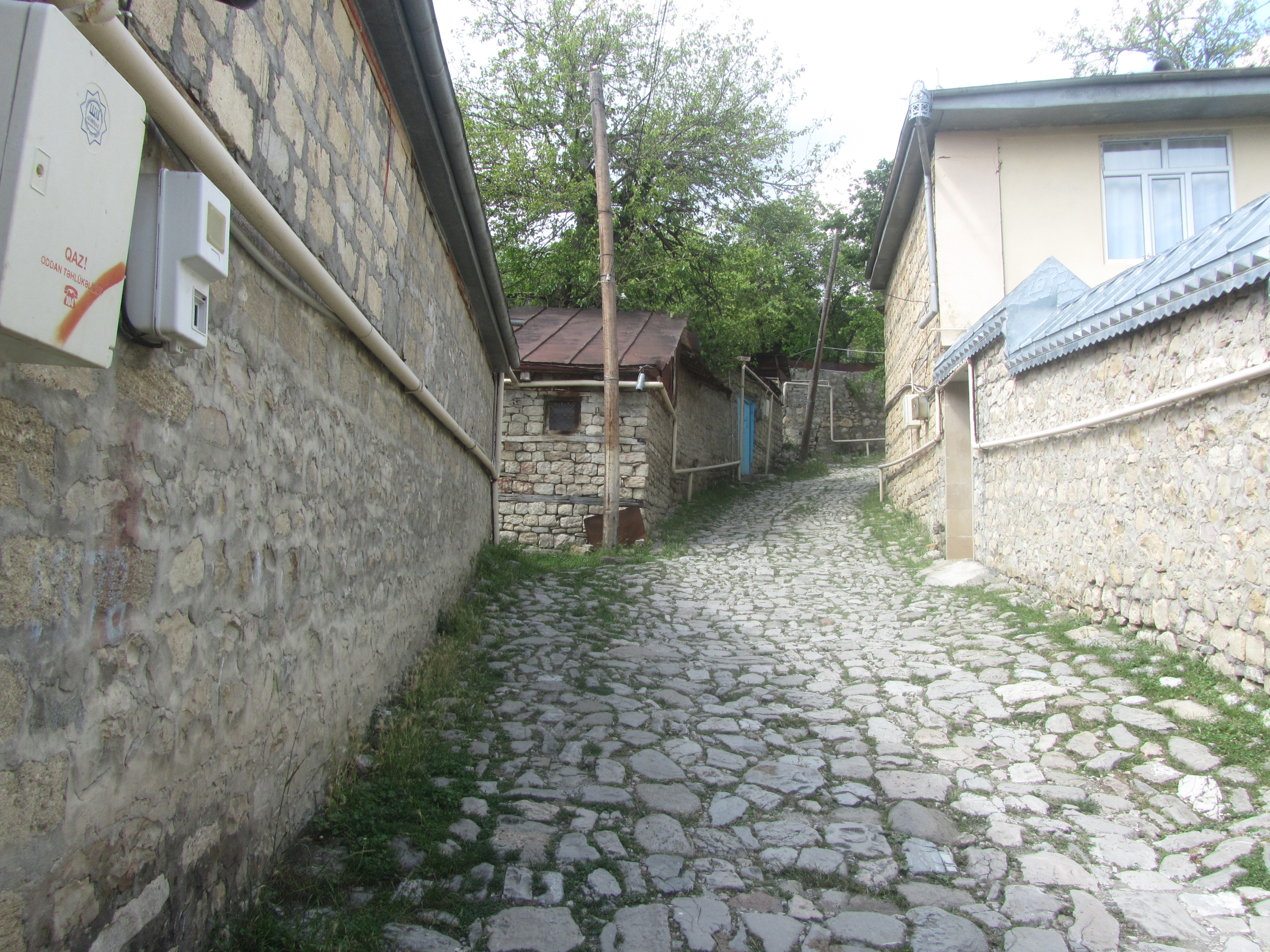

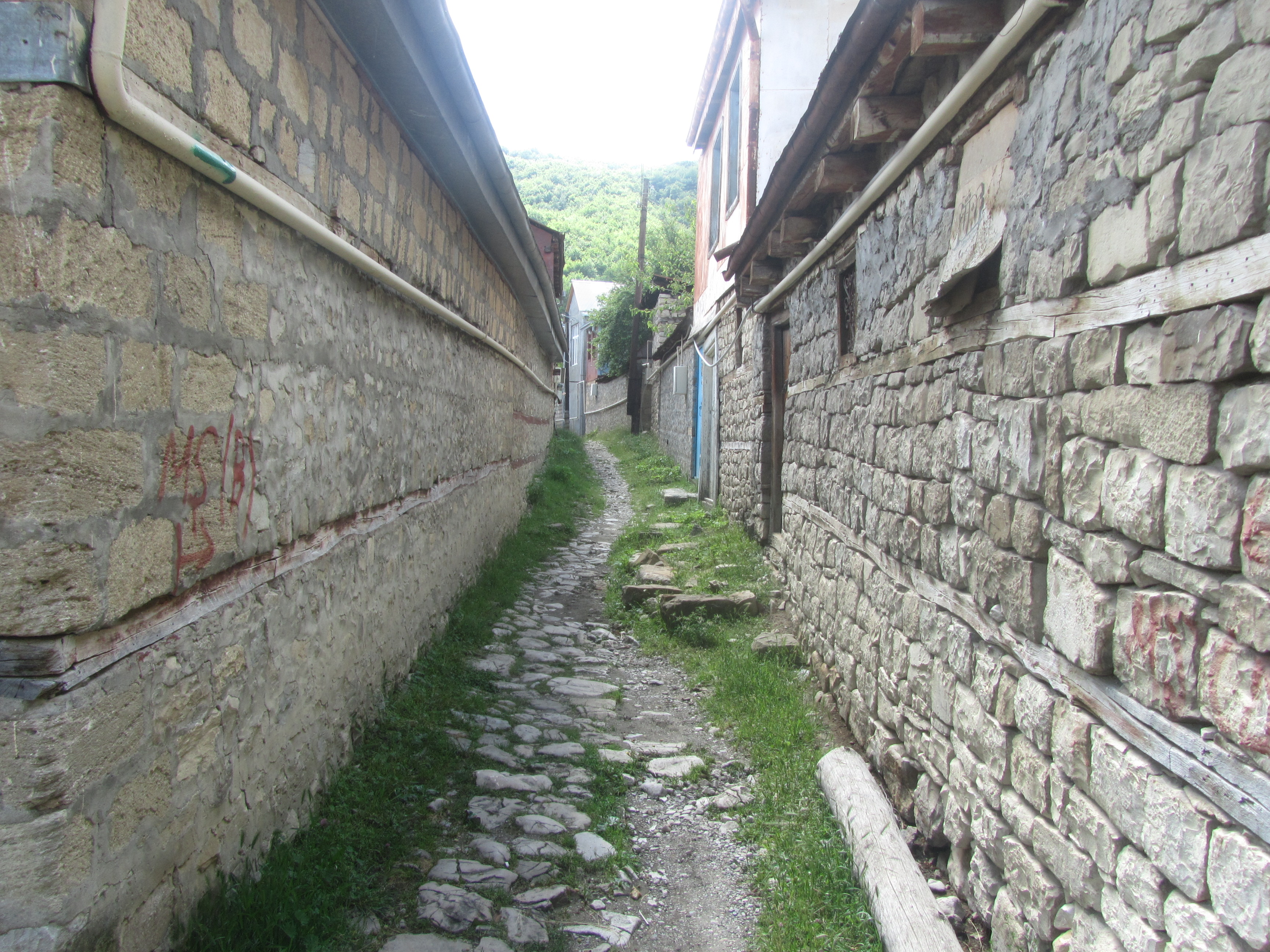

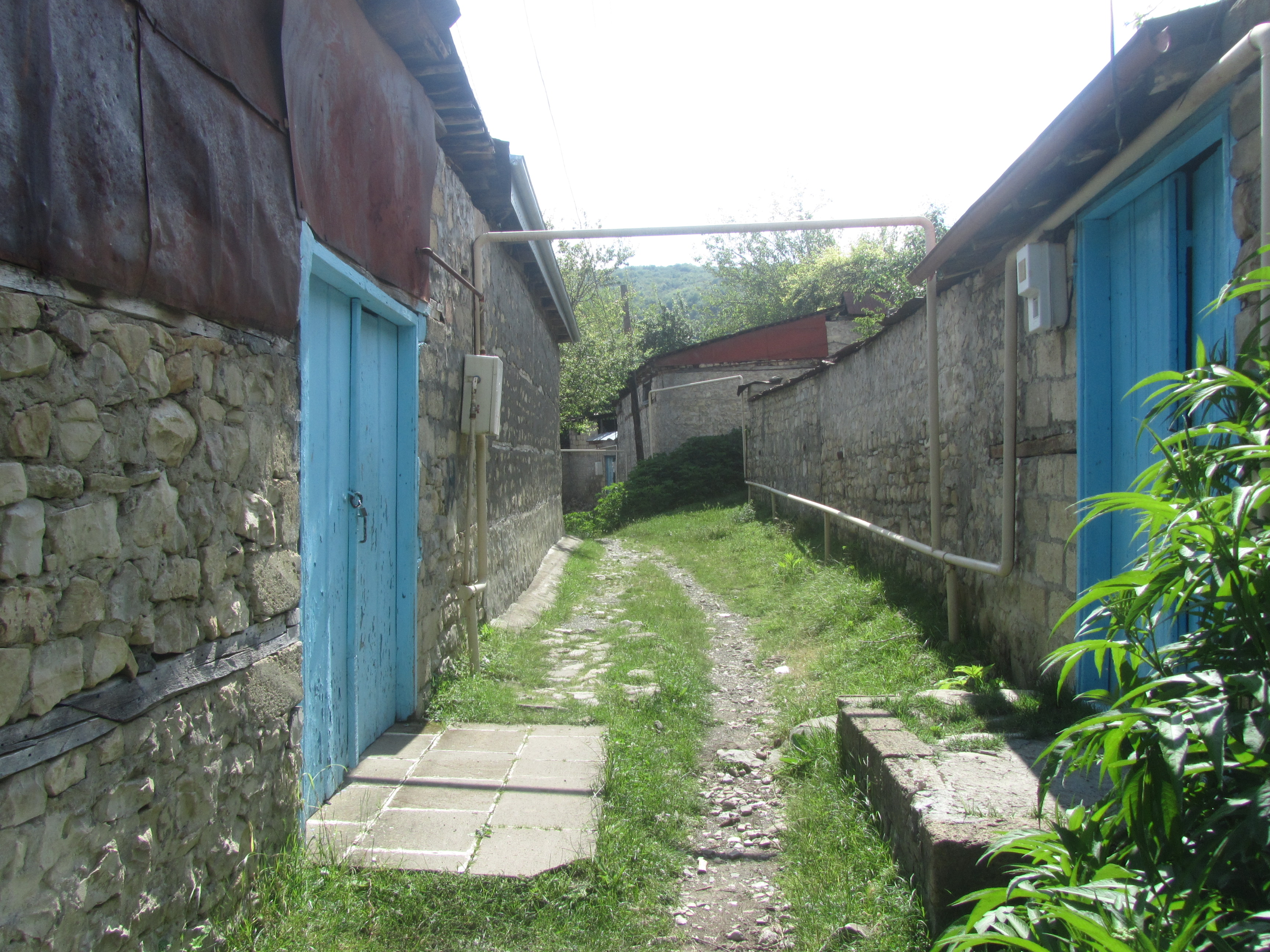

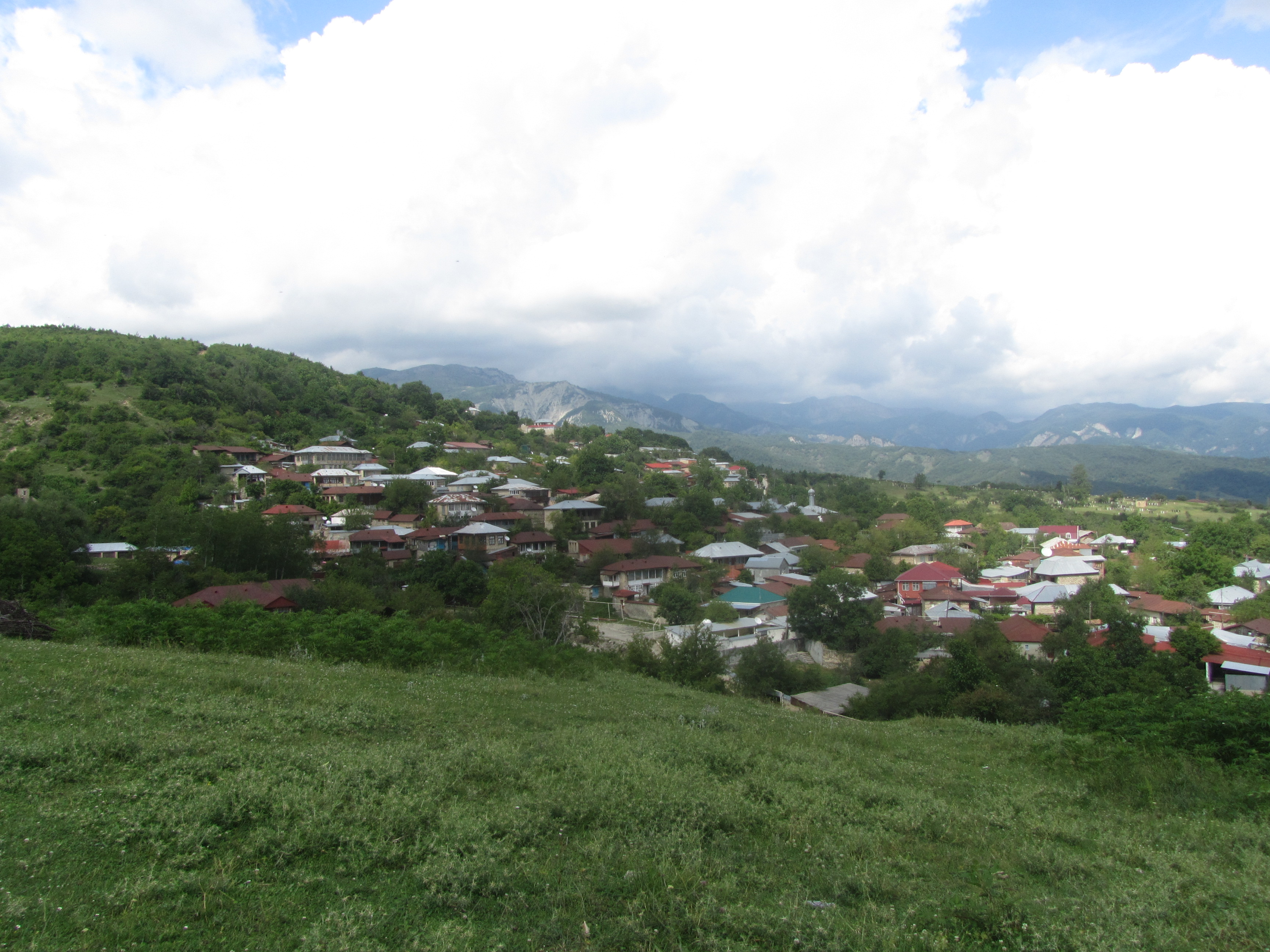

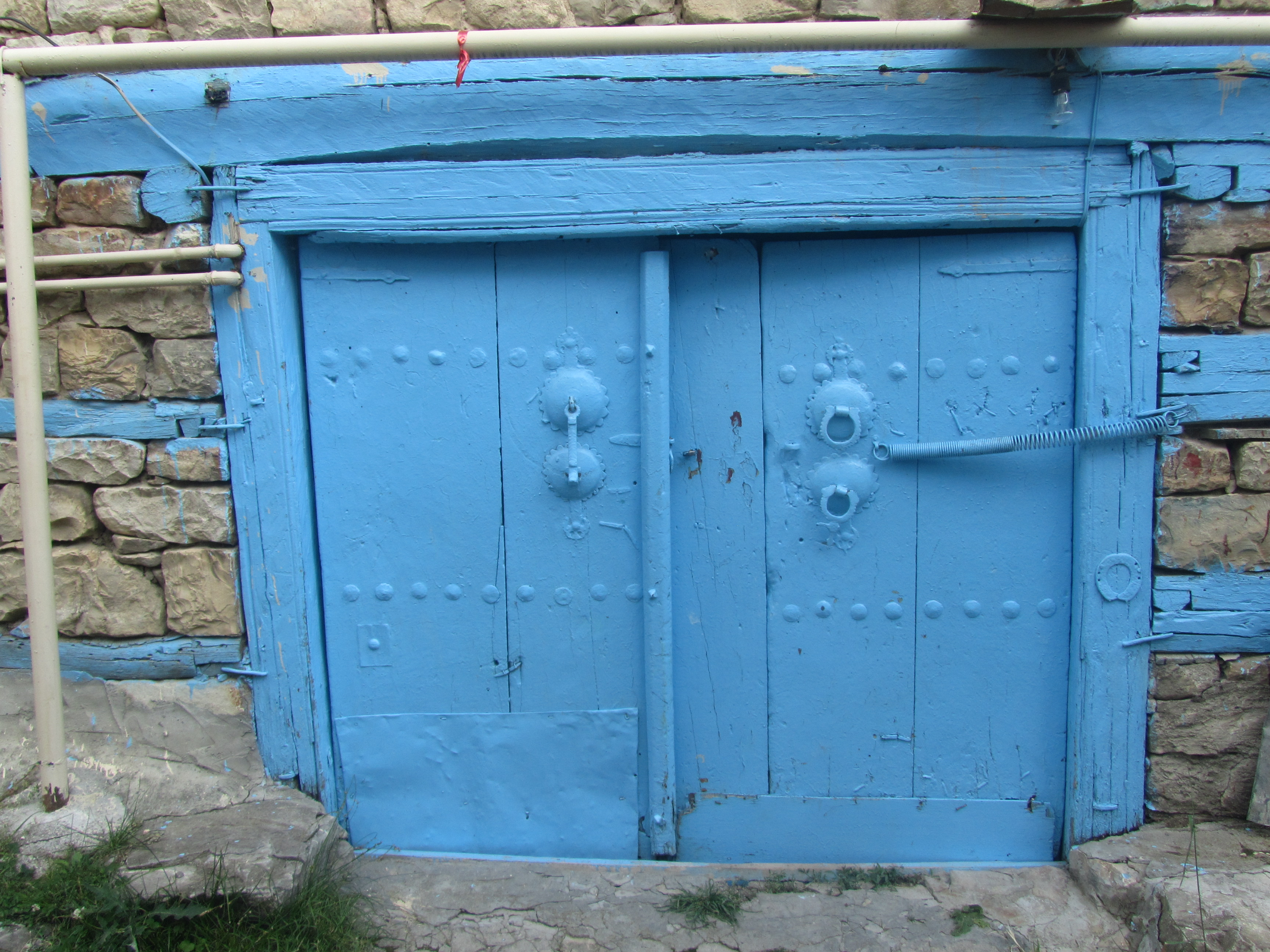

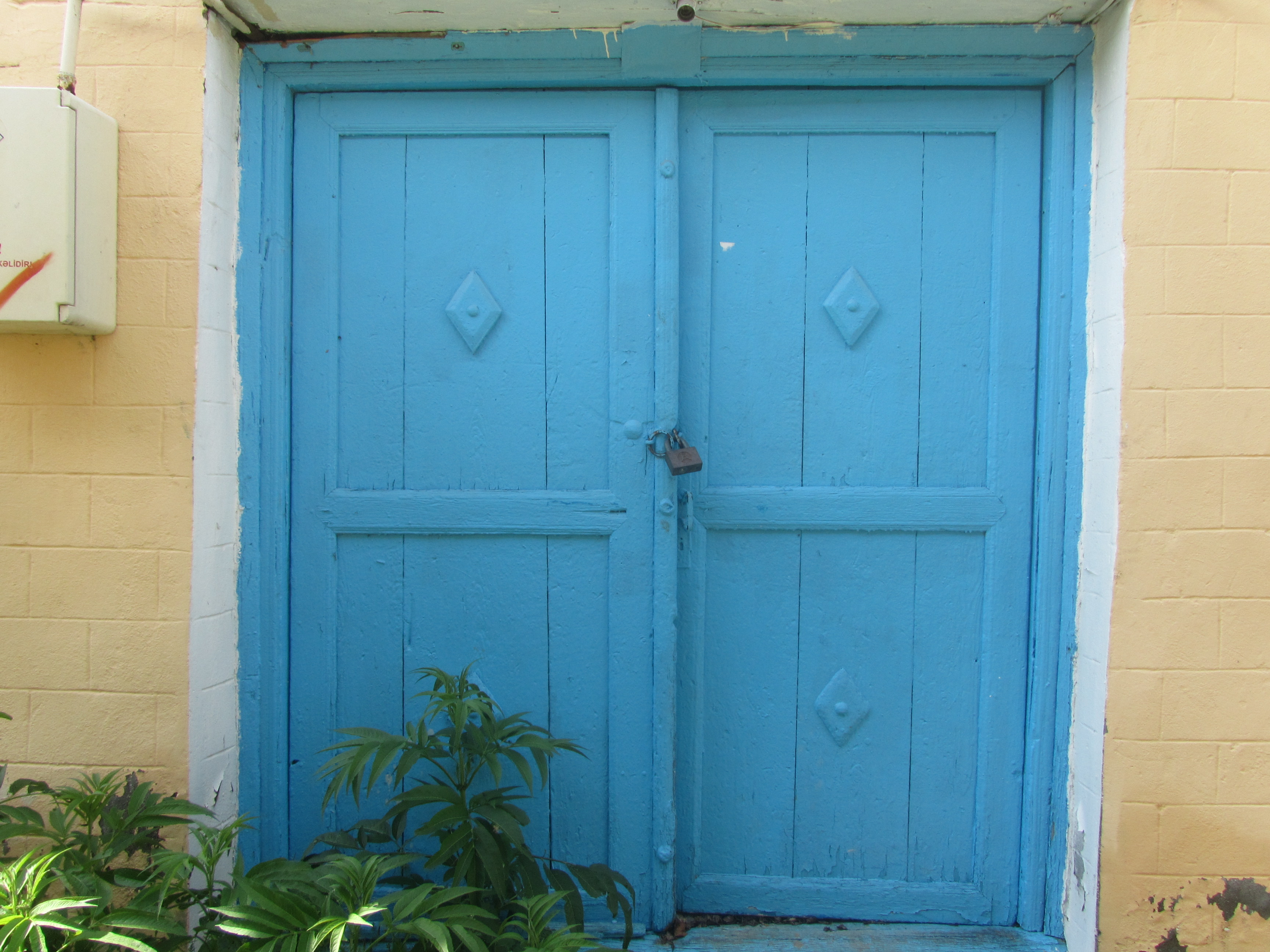

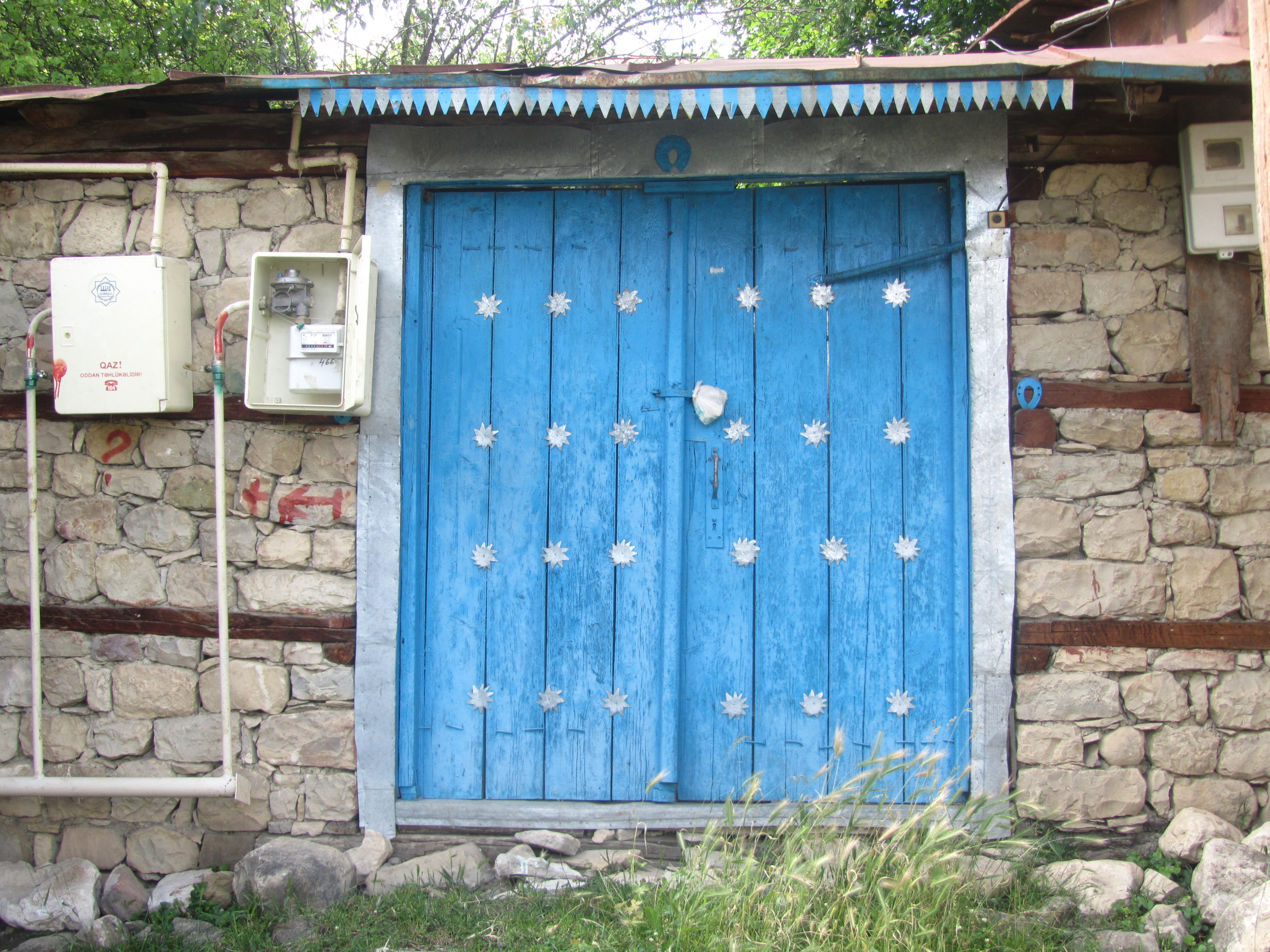

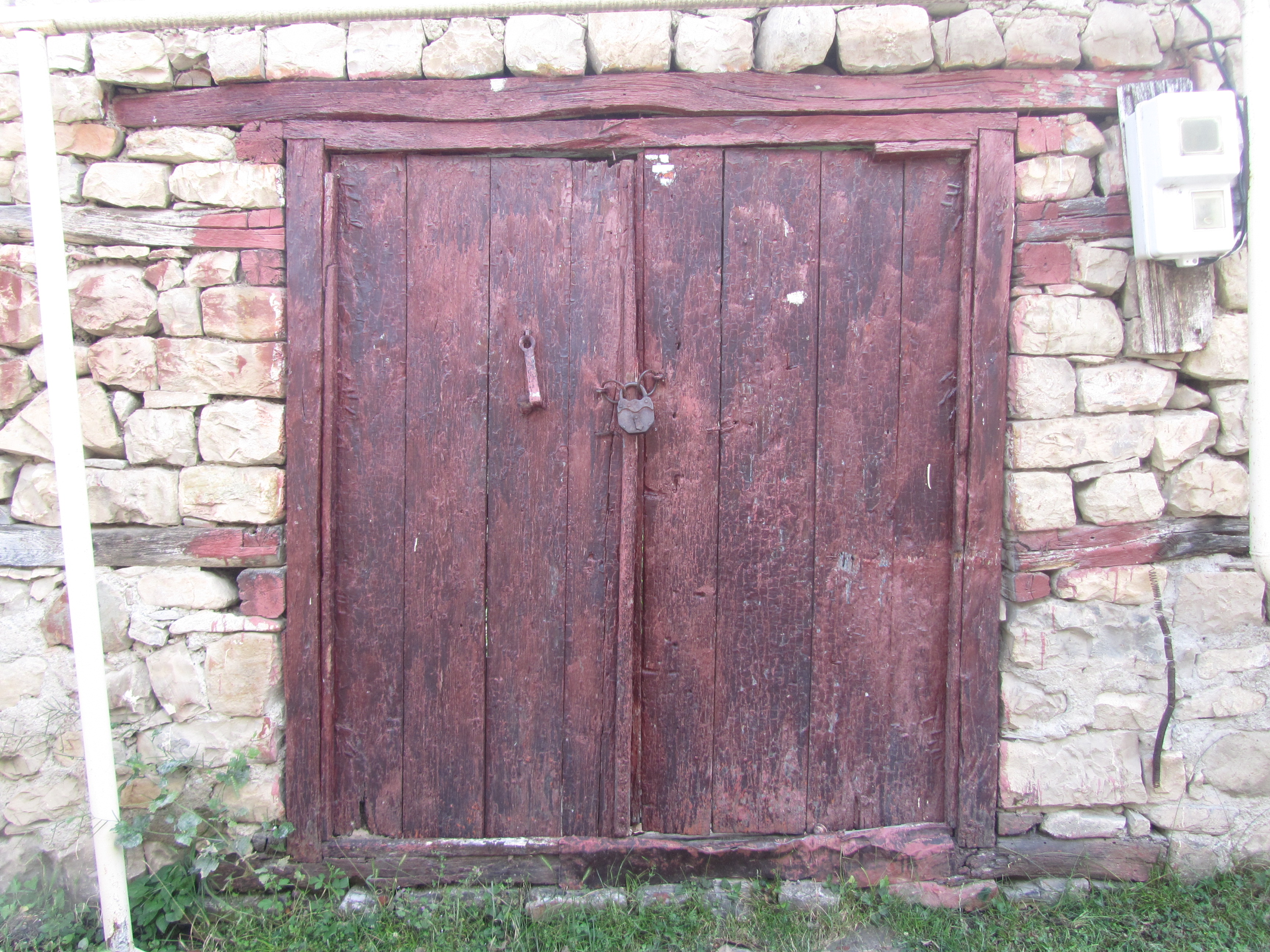

== See also ==
- Basgal Castle
