= Sargis II Hasan-Jalalyan =

- Catholicos of Aghvank
- Installed: 1810
- Term ended: 1815
- Predecessor: Hovhannes XII Hasan-Jalalyan
- Successor: Catholicosate disestablished
- Opposed to: Israel of Amaras; Simeon V of Gandzasar

Personal details
- Died: 19 December 1828 Tiflis, Georgia Governorate, Russian Empire
- Buried: Gandzasar monastery

Sargis II Hasan-Jalalyan (Armenian: Սարգիս Բ Հասան-Ջալալյանց, romanized: Sargis II Hasan-J̌alalyancʿ, died 19 December 1828) was the last catholicos of Aghvank (otherwise known as Church of Caucasian Albania, effectively a part of Armenian Church at this time) from 1810 to 1815.

== Family ==
He was from influential House of Hasan-Jalalyan of Khachen, born in 18th century. His father Allahverdi I (1747–1755) was killed by Mirzakhan, a headman of Khndzristan village on the orders of Panah Ali khan first khan of Karabakh. He was a nephew of Esai Hasan-Jalalyan (1702–1729), an earlier catholicos of Aghvank. His elder brother Hovhannes (1763–1786) was a catholicos as well. Sargis became a deacon during his tenure in 1760s. Hovhannes was arrested, interrogated and later killed by Ibrahim Khalil khan Javanshir, second ruler of Karabakh for his pro-Russian stance in 1786, along with his five brothers.

== Life in Georgia ==
According to Raffi, he was imprisoned and tortured alongside his brothers by Ibrahim Khalil on 16 November [O.S. 5 November] 1784. He was released after he paid 8000 tomans as ransom on 22 August 1785 thanks to intercession of Bike khanum, wife of the khan. He left for Gandzasar later, his brother however, was replaced by Israel of Amaras as Catholicos, supported by Melik Shahnazar of Varanda and Ibrahim Khalil Khan. He later decided to join Melik Mejlum of Jraberd and seek a refuge in Ganja Khanate in 1788. Javad Khan appointed him as head of Armenian diocese of Ganja. However, his brothers Jalal-bek and Daniel-bek were caught and later executed by Ibrahim Khalil, during their secret visit to Gandzasar to receive monastic utensils. He was later appointed as catholicos of Aghvank in 1794 with support of Javad Khan, as well as refugee meliks Melik Mejlum and Melik Abov. According to Raffi, this move was not supported by Echmiadzin at the time. According to Raffi, not having support of Armenian religious authorities, he moved to Tiflis on 25 March 1798. However, according to Hasan-Jalalyan's own letter to Russian commander-in-chief in Caucasus Yermolov (written in 1823) he left for Georgia in 1796 when Zubov's army arrived. Travelling from there to Echmiadzin, at the request of George XII of Georgia he was appointed as bishop and head of Haghpat monastery by Luke I (1780–1799), who also barred him from using Catholicos title. He was still head of monastery as of 24 February 1801. He lived there until 1808.

== Life in Karabakh ==
Israel was removed from his on post on 6 December [O.S. 24 November] 1806 by Gudovich and was replaced by Sargis in 1809 under the authority of Hovhannes Aknetsi, Archbishop of Armenians in Georgia (1802–1810). He moved to Gandzasar only in 1812 on the eve of Treaty of Gulistan. Although he promised not to use Catholicos title, now that he was in charge of church, he started to use it again, which met strong reactions from Armenian Church leadership. According to a letter written by Nikolay Rtishchev in 1813, Russian authorities were also against this entitlement. He was anathemized by Yeprem I (1809–1830) in December 1815 and Russian authorities forced Sargis to drop his title and be a metropolitan bishop instead. Thus, he became last catholicos of 1500-year-old church of Caucasian Albania (or Aghvank).

He went to Nukha in 1816, asking for relics of St. Stephen from Ismail Khan Khoyski, Khan of Shaki. Although he was given the relics, he was prohibited from leaving the city by Russian authorities for a while. In 1820 his office was largely taken over by his nephew Baghdasar Hasan-Jalalyan.

== Arrest and death ==
Sargis pleaded for protection of local Armenians by Abbas Mirza in 1826 when the latter attacked Shusha during Russo-Persian War of 1826–1828. After Shusha was retaken by Valerian Madatov, he was accused of treason against the state by Yermolov, who even called him 'Mullah Sargis' mockingly. He was arrested and put jail in Tbilisi, although was released later thanks to efforts of leader of Armenians of Georgia, future Nerses V (1843–1857). He died on 19 December 1828 in Tiflis.

== Sources ==
- Bournoutian, George (2021). From the Kur to the Aras: A Military History of Russia's Move into the South Caucasus and the First Russo-Iranian War, 1801–1813. Brill. ISBN 978-9004445154.
- Bournoutian, George (1998). Russia and the Armenians of Transcaucasia 1797-1889: A Documentary Record, Annotated Translation and Commentary. Mazda. ISBN 978-1568590684.
