= Yerits Mankants Monastery =

Armenian monastery in Azerbaijan

- Երից Մանկանց Վանք
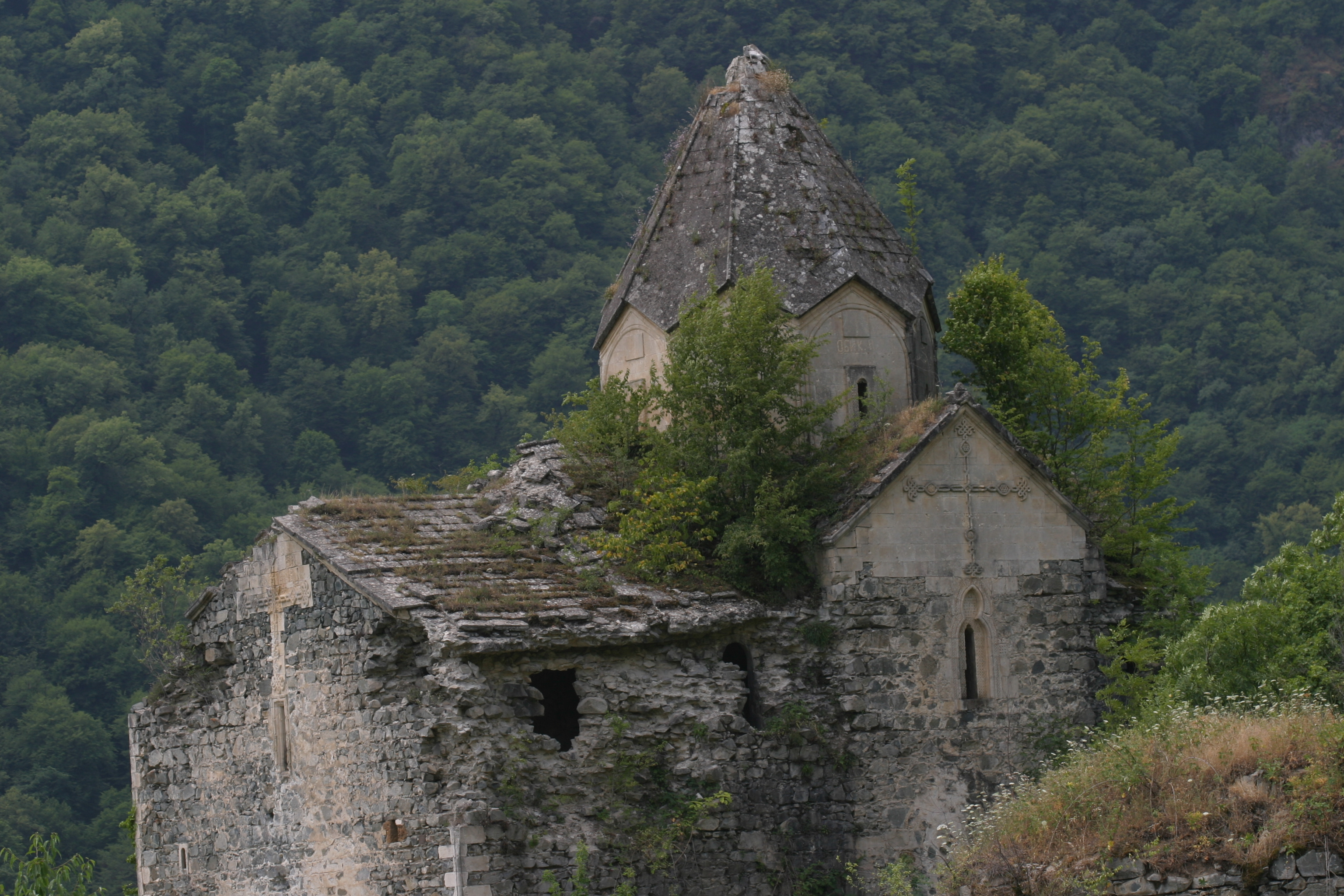

- Location within Azerbaijan

Religion
- Affiliation: Armenian Apostolic Church

Location
- Location: Nagorno-Karabakh, Azerbaijan
- Coordinates: 40.252114°N 46.640669°E

Architecture
- Style: Armenian
- Completed: 1691

Yerits Mankants Monastery (Armenian: Երից մանկանց վանք, romanized: Yerits’ mankants’ vank’, lit. 'Three Youths Monastery') is a 17th-century Armenian monastery, in the region of Nagorno-Karabakh, Azerbaijan. The monastery is located in the mountains to the west of Maghavuz, southwest of Tonashen, and close to the fortress of Jraberd.

== History ==
Yerits Mankants monastery is the most notable example of monasteries built during the late Middle Ages in Nagorno-Karabakh, after an interruption in church building from the 14th to 16th centuries. The monastery complex comprises a church, a refectory, living quarters, several secular buildings, and a nearby cemetery. The cemetery likely predates the monastery, based on khachkars that are significantly older than the construction of the monastery. Yerits Mankants Monastery was built around 1691 in the historical county of Jraberd. The monastery was established by the feudal family of Melik-Israelians, Lords of Jraberd, with an apparent purpose to rival the Holy See of Gandzasar. The construction of the monastery was funded by Suleiman I, the Shah of Persia at the time.

In 1819, the Catholicosate of Yerits Mankants monastery was abolished with the death of Catholicos Simeon II.

During the First Nagorno-Karabakh War, when Azerbaijani forces occupied the town of Gülüstan, 2,000-3,000 Armenian residents of the area took refuge in the monastery in an effort to reach Martakert Province. Following the war, efforts were undertaken to repair and restore the monastery, which had taken significant damage over the centuries, but these efforts were interrupted by the Second Nagorno-Karabakh War.

== Gallery ==
Scheme of the monastery

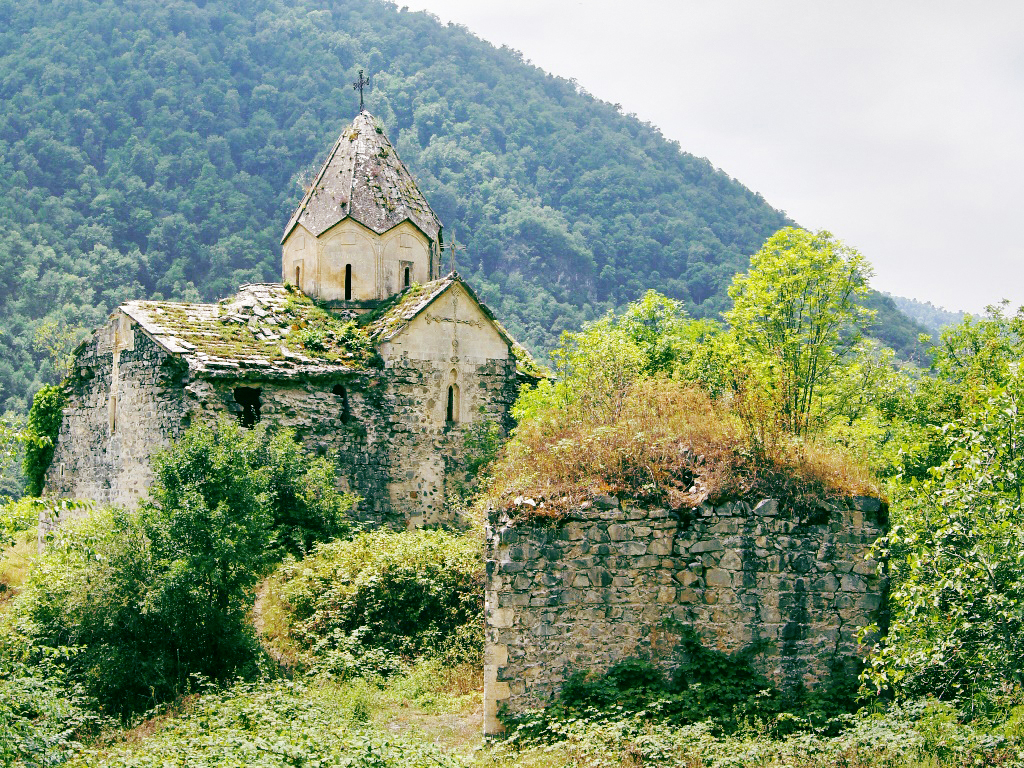

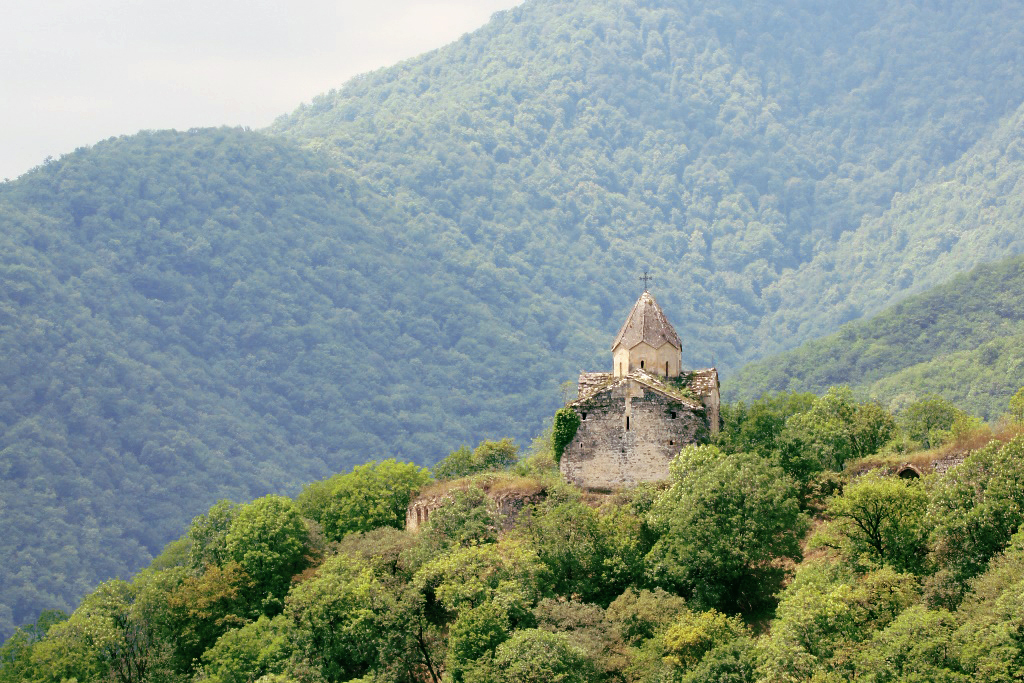

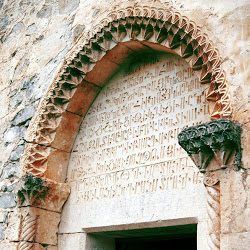

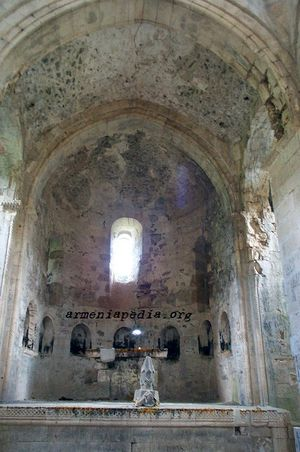

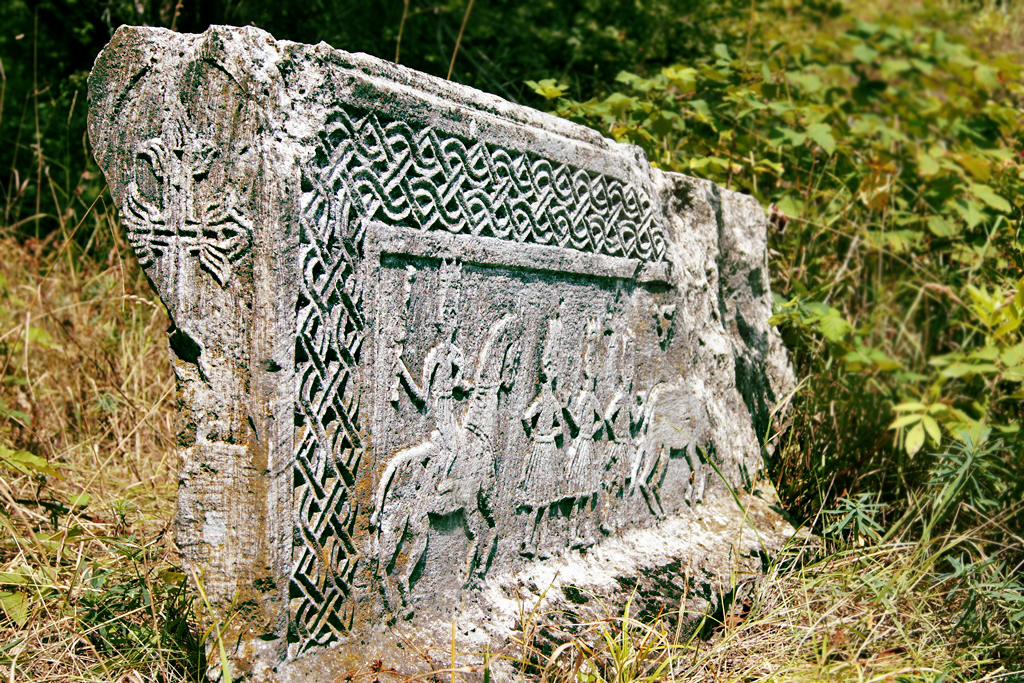

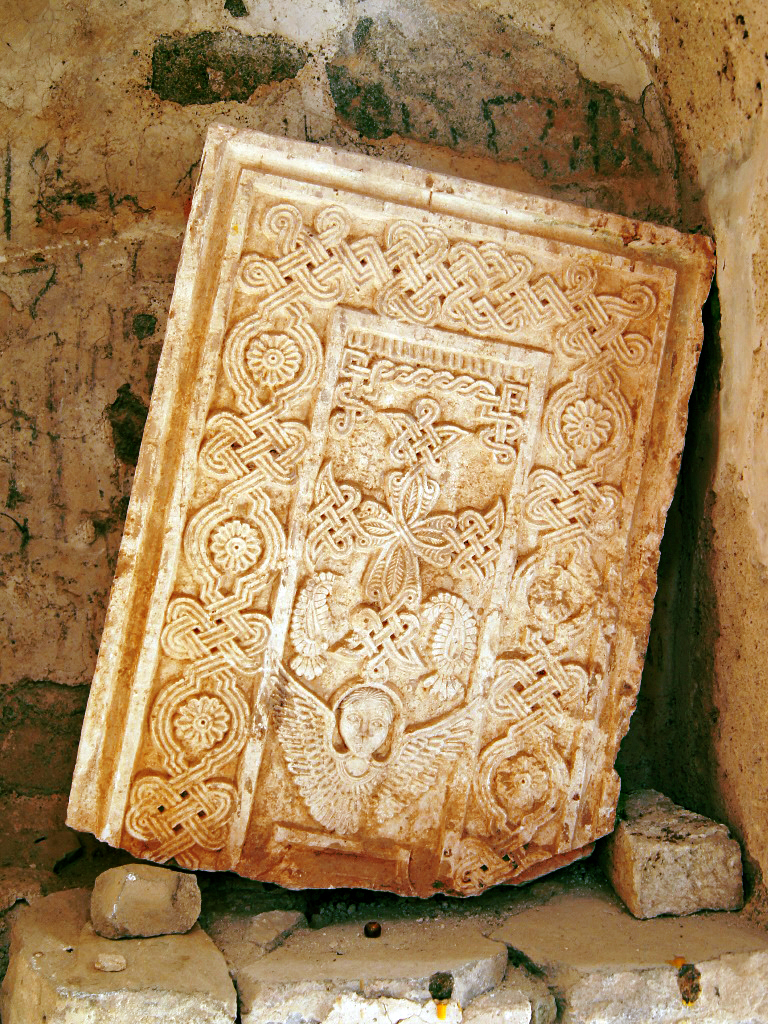

== See also ==
- Culture of Artsakh
