= Gandzasar (disambiguation) =

Gandzasar originally refers to Gandzasar monastery in Nagorno Karabakh.

Gandzasar may also refer to:

- FC Gandzasar Kapan, an association football club based in Kapan, Armenia
- Gandzasar Stadium, a football stadium in Kapan, home of FC Gandzasar Kapan
- Gandzasar Kapan Training Centre, is the training ground and academy base of FC Gandzasar Kapan
