= Esayi Hasan-Jalalyan =

Armenian historian

- Catholicos of Aghvank
- Installed: 1702
- Term ended: 1728
- Predecessor: Simeon IV and Eremia II
- Successor: Nerses V
- Opposed to: Nerses V

Personal details
- Died: 1728

Esayi Hasan-Jalalyan (Armenian: Եսայի Հասան-Ջալալյան; died 1728) was an Armenian churchman and historian who served as the catholicos of Aghvank (otherwise known as Church of Caucasian Albania, effectively a part of Armenian Church at this time) from 1702 (de facto, 1701) to 1728. He was a member of the Hasan-Jalalyan noble family.

== Life ==
His birthdate is not known. According to Raffi, his father was Velijan III (d. 1686), melik of Khachen. He was among the Armenian nobility who convened together and sent Catholicos Jacob IV along Israel Ori to gather Western support for liberation of Christians, namely Armenians from Safavid Empire.

=== Catholicosate ===
After deaths of Simeon IV (1675-1701) and Eremia II (Esayi's uncle, 1676-1700), who were rival catholicoses of Aghvank, Esayi applied to Shah Sultan Husayn of Safavids in October–November of 1701 to be recognized as new catholicos and paid 50 gold. He was later consecrated as catholicos by Nahabed I of Armenia in 1702. Esayi used opportunity to broaden his influence to Russia during 10-month vacancy in Armenian See. However, another bishop, namely Nerses V (1706-1736) declared his own catholicosate in Yerits Mankants Monastery. Although in 1707, Alexander I of Julfa supported Esayi against Nerses, the latter kept claiming legitimacy. He went to Russia in 1711 with Israel Ori to meet Peter the Great, however Israel died in Astrakhan and Esayi went back to Karabakh. Alexander's successor Asdvadzadur of Armenia later took certain privileges of Esayi back to Armenian church in 1716, but returned these rights in 1719.

Esayi was strongly pro-Russian and sent two letters - first on 23 September 1718 and second on 1 April 1721 - to Peter, requesting his assistance. He later went to visit the Georgian king Vakhtang VI on 28 May 1722 and joined his army in his eventually unsuccessful rebellion against Safavids with promised aid from Peter the Great. He managed to gather 10.000 troops from different meliks of Karabakh on 18 September 1722, However, Vakhtang, abandoned by his Russian allies, returned to Tbilisi in November 1722. Against the wishes of Asdvadzadur, he resisted to Ahmed III, when Ottoman armies invaded Azerbaijan using the opportunity in 1722 and supported Davit Bek. However after capture of Yerevan by Ottomans on 28 September 1724 and following Treaty of Constantinople, when Russians recognized Ottoman ownership of Georgia and Armenia, Esayi did not submit and supported prince Hovhannes of Khatchen and Varanda, commonly known as Avan Yuzbashi, to defend Karabakh and later Armenia from the Ottoman Empire - which Avan and his lords did undefeated until 1729. In July 1726, he accompanied by Karabakh beys, meliks and landlords, went to Barda to visit Sari Mustafa Pasha (son of Gazi Hüseyin Pasha and future son-in-law of the Sultan) for negotiations.

According to some sources, he was accused of betrayal by other Armenian nobles and forced to commit suicide in 1728 - but the exact circumstances are not yet established.

== Work ==
He collected inscriptions of Karabakh monasteries (Dadivank, Katarovank, Goshavank, Gandzasar, etc.), different manuscripts of Gospels. He is most famous for his incomplete work named "A brief history of Aghvank region", which is a description of the events of his time and reaches up to 1723. The book was first published in Shushi by Baghdasar Hasan-Jalalyan in 1836, later in French (1876) by Marie-Félicité Brosset, Armenian (1868), Georgian (1971), Azerbaijani (1992).
