= Jraberd, Martakert =

Jraberd / Chileburt Ջրաբերդ / Çiləbürt
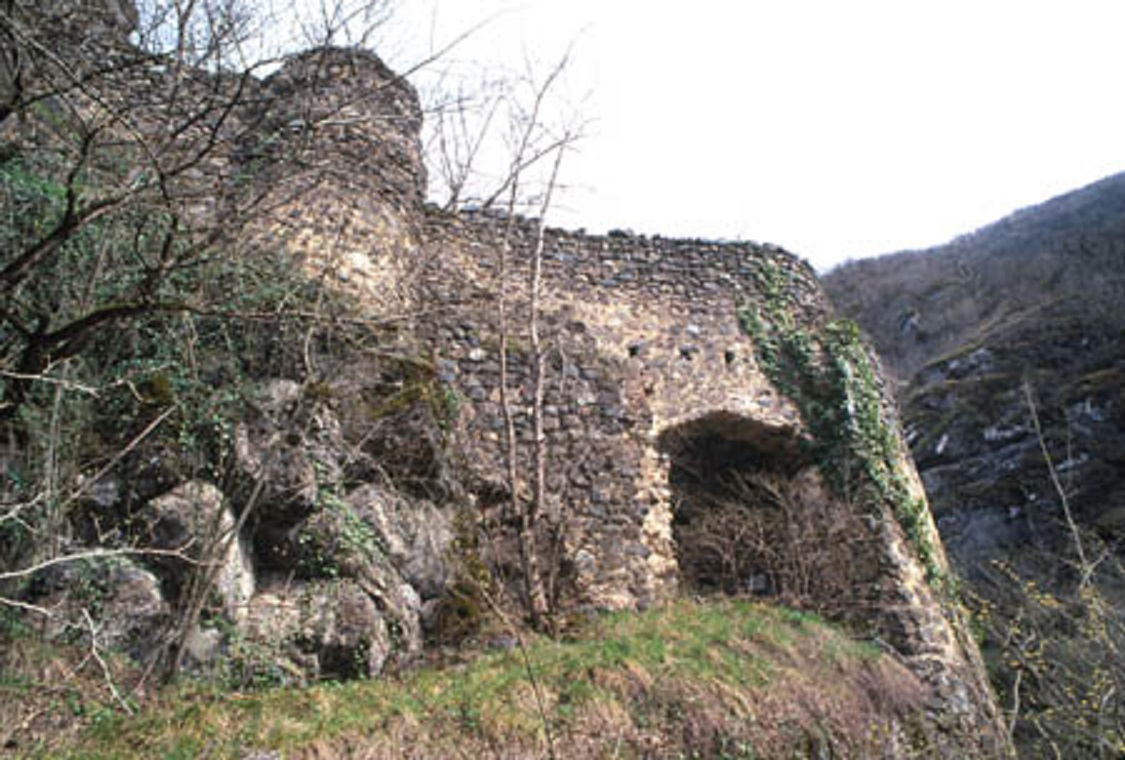
- Jraberd Fortress, located in the mountains to the west of the village

- Location within Azerbaijan Location within Karabakh Economic Region
- Coordinates: 40°15′03″N 46°50′36″E
- Country: Azerbaijan
  - District: Aghdara

Population (2015)
  - Total: 88
- Time zone: UTC+4 (AZT)

Jraberd (Armenian: Ջրաբերդ) or Chileburt (Azerbaijani: Çiləbürt, also Çiləbörd, Chilabord) is a village located in the Aghdara District of Azerbaijan, in the region of Nagorno-Karabakh. Until 2023, it was controlled by the breakaway Republic of Artsakh. The village had an ethnic Armenian-majority population until the expulsion of the Armenian population of Nagorno-Karabakh by Azerbaijan following the 2023 Azerbaijani offensive in Nagorno-Karabakh.

== History ==
During the Soviet period, the village was a part of the Mardakert District of the Nagorno-Karabakh Autonomous Oblast.

The village was administered by the Republic of Artsakh after the First Nagorno-Karabakh War. The village was on the Nagorno-Karabakh Line of Contact and there were allegations of ceasefire violations in the village's vicinity.

== Jraberd Fortress ==
Hasan Jalalyan, the founder of the princely family that ruled the Principality of Khachen lived at the fortress of Jraberd, located in the mountains to the west of Maghavuz, southwest of Tonashen, close to the Yerits Mankants Monastery.

== Economy and culture ==
The village is part of the community of Martakert.

== Demographics ==
The village had 63 inhabitants in 2005, and 88 inhabitants in 2015.
