= Baghdasar Hasan-Jalalyan =

Armenian prelate (1775–1854)

- Metropolitan of the Aghvank Armenians; prelate of the Diocese of Artsakh
- Native name: Բաղդասար Հասան-Ջալալյան
- Church: Armenian Apostolic Church
- Diocese: Diocese of Artsakh
- See: Gandzasar; Shusha
- Appointed: 1830 (metropolitan); 1836 (prelate of the diocese)

Orders
- Consecration: 18 September 1820 (bishop), by Catholicos Yeprem

Personal details
- Born: 12 January 1775 Gandzasar, Khachen, Karabakh Khanate
- Died: June 27, 1854 (aged 79) Shusha, Shusha uezd, Elisabethpol Governorate
- Buried: Gandzasar monastery
- Parents: Daniel-beg and Hripsime

Baghdasar Hasan-Jalalyan (Armenian: Բաղդասար Հասան-Ջալալյան, romanized: Baġdasar Hasan-J̌alalyan; 12 January 1775 – 27 June 1854) was an Armenian prelate of the Hasan-Jalalyan family of Khachen in Karabakh. He was appointed metropolitan of the Aghvank Armenians in 1830 and from 1837 served from Shusha as prelate of the Karabakh (Artsakh) diocese, described by his biographer Muratsan as its first. He restored Gandzasar monastery after its abandonment under Ibrahim Khalil Khan, recovered monastic estates from local landowners, built the prelacy in Shusha (1840–43), and in 1837 acquired the printing house of the Basel Mission in the town. Most of what is known about his life comes from a biography written by the novelist Muratsan in 1877 and published in 1880.

== Family and early life ==
Baghdasar was born in Gandzasar village to Daniel-beg and his wife Hripsime. His grandfather was Melik Allahverdi (1747–1755), whose eight sons included the catholicos Hovhannes and Sargis, later the last catholicos of Aghvank. He was baptised in the monastery and received his schooling from his uncle Sargis. Drawn to the monastic life from childhood, he entered the service of the Gandzasar church and became known for his singing voice.

In 1785 the meliks of Karabakh, with the approval of Catholicos Hovhannes, petitioned Catherine II for Russian protection against Ibrahim Khalil Khan. According to Muratsan the petition was betrayed to the khan by Israel, a rival catholicos at Amaras. Hovhannes, summoned by the khan, died in 1786, beaten or, in some accounts, poisoned, and the khan began seizing Gandzasar's estates.

Baghdasar's father and his uncle Sargis held out for six years. In 1792 they fled with the monks to Ganja, where Javad Khan received them. There Sargis was consecrated catholicos of Aghvank on 18 December 1792, in opposition to Israel. Baghdasar became a senior deacon in 1796 and was ordained a vardapet in 1798 by his uncle. Muratsan says the khan, who often attended the Armenian church for the young man's singing, encouraged the ordination. His father, Daniel-beg, was killed by Ibrahim Khalil when he returned to Karabakh to recover the family's hidden valuables.

As Russian forces approached Ganja and the region fell into disorder, Sargis and Baghdasar moved to Tiflis, where Heraclius II received them. His son George XII pressed Ghukas Karnetsi of Etchmiadzin to give Sargis the prelacy of Haghpat. On a visit to Echmiadzin the catholicos heard Baghdasar sing, had a costly silk vestment put on him in the church, and told Sargis to confer a higher rank on him. Baghdasar received the rank of supreme vardapet (tsayragoyn vardapet) at Haghpat in 1802.

In 1808 Sargis sent Baghdasar and Grigor Hasan-Jalalyan, a nephew, back to Karabakh with Russian passes and letters of introduction from the authorities in Tiflis, together with fifteen families who had remained in Ganja. He found Gandzasar in ruins: its gates and cells wrecked, the church filled with rubbish, and its villages in the hands of local landowners. He repaired the buildings, recalled monks, and with the help of the Russian governor and of Mehdi-Kuli-khan of Karabakh brought back the villagers who had scattered. A decree of the khan dated 1809 ordered landholders to return the monastery's lands. Baghdasar spent the next four years in disputes with the landowners. A millstone quarry held by Ibrahim Khalil Khan's son Khanlar agha Javanshir (1785–1832) was recovered only after a second order, later confirmed by a Russian court in Shusha in 1823.

Sargis returned to Gandzasar in 1812 and resumed the title of catholicos with the khan's support. Etchmiadzin objected, and the state intervened, ending the Aghvank catholicosate in 1815 and giving Sargis the rank of metropolitan. Muratsan writes that Muslim landowners whom Baghdasar had dispossessed were hostile to both men and threatened their lives, and that Sargis therefore wanted Baghdasar as his successor. Baghdasar was ordained a bishop by Yeprem I at Echmiadzin on 18 September 1820, in his forty-fifth year. Same year he baptized Mirza Yusuf Nersesov. For the next eight years he carried out Sargis's business and conducted lawsuits against Muslim landowners in Karabakh. Sargis died in 1828.

== Metropolitanate ==
Two years after Sargis's death, the people and meliks of Armenian population of Karabakh petitioned Echmiadzin to appoint Baghdasar as their metropolitan. Catholicos Yeprem did so in 1830, naming him metropolitan of all the Armenians of Aghvank. He widened the steep road up to Gandzasar and built a two-storey stone prelacy there in four years. Muratsan credits him with recovering up to sixty villages and estates for the monastery, some 30,000 desyatinas, and says he made over to it lands that had belonged to his own family, with the hope of funding a theological school. He opened a private school at Gandzasar and settled twenty-seven households of his own subjects, more than 150 people, in the village. In 1834 Nicholas I awarded him the Order of St. Anna, first class.

When diocesan consistories were introduced in 1836, Catholicos John VIII summoned him to Echmiadzin and appointed him prelate of the Artsakh diocese. After arranging for the security of the Gandzasar brotherhood he moved to Shusha in 1837.

== Prelate in Shusha ==
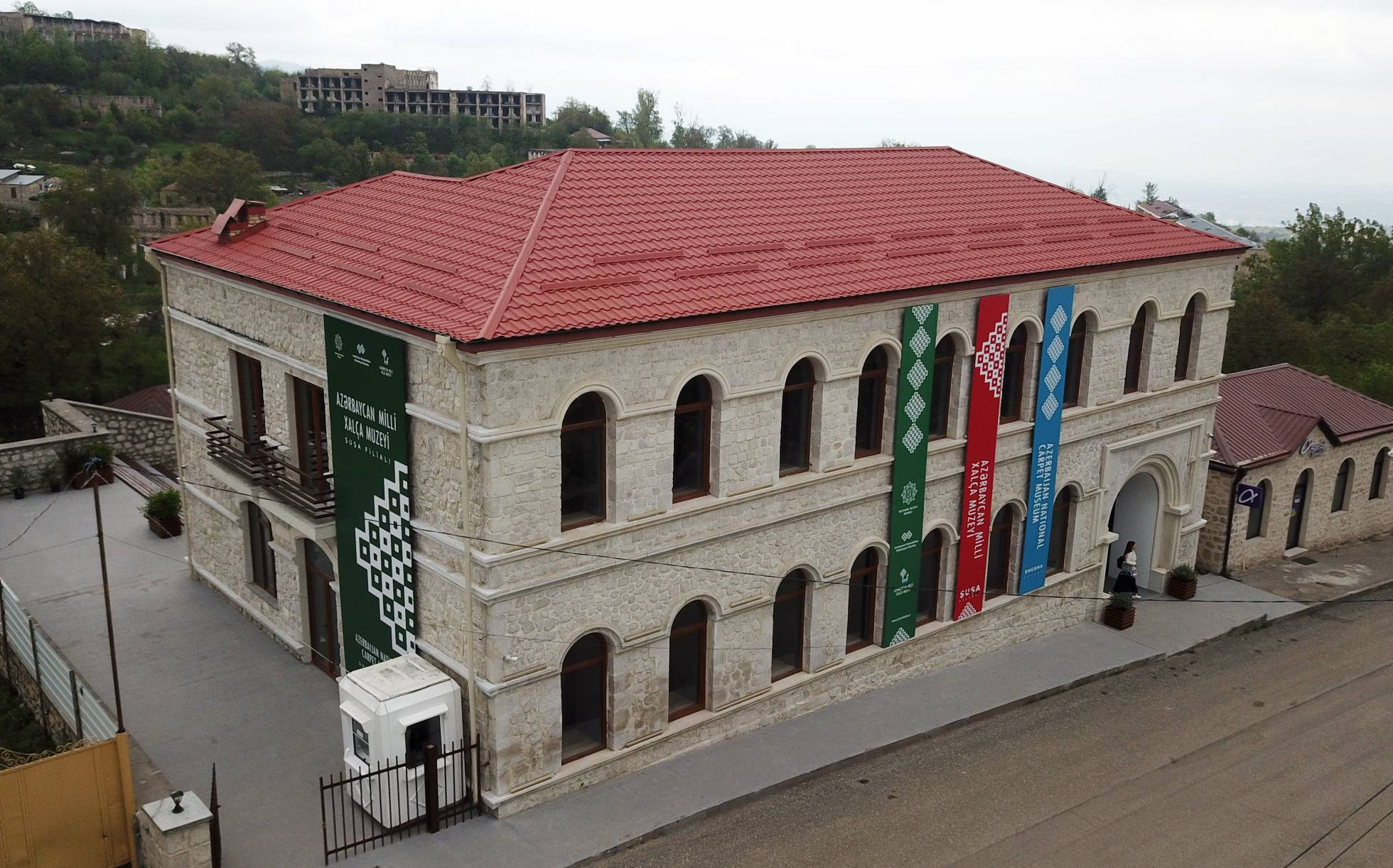
Former printhouse of Basel Mission and later of prelacy, now serving as Shusha Carpet Museum

In 1840 Baghdasar began a three-storey prelacy in Shusha at his own expense, with a walled garden and a fountain supplied by pipes from wells, which townspeople also used. He finished it in 1843. An inscription over the main door records that he built it at his own expense and bequeathed it to Gandzasar monastery, and threatens anyone who removed it from the monastery. Until 1870 it served as the prelacy. In 1871–72 Archbishop Sargis Hasan-Jalalyants doubled its size, and it then housed the school, the prelacy, the diocesan consistory and a printing house.

He founded a spiritual school in Shusha and bought land in front of the prelacy for a purpose-built school and church, but died before the building could be started. He also repaired the vaulted gavit at Gandzasar for about 5,000 rubles.

The Basel Mission had run a printing house in Shusha since the late 1820s, and in 1832 Baghdasar authorised its Armenian publications as censor, and his name appears on the title pages of books printed in 1832–33. After a Russian ukase of 1835 ended the mission's work among Armenians, the missionaries left Shusha in 1837–38. Petoyan writes that in September 1837 Baghdasar bought the mission's printing house. Muratsan says he bought a press with all its equipment while the prelacy was still in rented houses and installed it on the second floor of the new building, where it was still in use when he wrote. A history of Aghvank and Georgia by Esayi Hasan-Jalalyan was printed in Shusha in 1839 through Baghdasar's efforts.

In 1848, by government order, a customs house that had occupied Amaras monastery was moved to Jabrayil, and the monastery and its lands passed to the church authorities. Muratsan credits Baghdasar's efforts with this outcome. He also planted a large garden at Amaras at a cost of over 2,000 rubles.

== Estates and lawsuits ==
Muratsan and Raffi both say that after settling in Shusha Baghdasar's first major undertaking was to recover the estates of Dadivank from Khurshidbanu, a daughter of Mehdi-Kuli-khan, and other Muslim beks. Muratsan puts the cost of the litigation at over 24,000 rubles and the estates at about 140,000 desyatinas; Raffi gives about 30,000 rubles and about 150,000 desyatinas. A letter of 1852 from Baghdasar to Catholicos Nerses says he had recovered many monastic estates with great effort and expense. According to Muratsan the monastery drew over 1,500 rubles a year from these lands between 1851 and 1873. After Baghdasar's death many passed to Khurshidbanu, Davud agha Aghalarov (son of and other beks, and in 1880 the suits were still before the provincial court at Ganja and the judicial chamber in Tiflis.

== Death and legacy ==
In his last years illness left him unable to do more, and he died on 27 June 1854. Later a tombstone was erected on 9 July 1854. Shusha and Gandzasar quarrelled over where he should lie; his body was carried through the town's churches for eight days before being taken to Gandzasar, as his will required. The funeral, led by Bishop Gevorg Vehapetyan, included liturgies in the Armenian and Russian churches of Shusha. A hundred armed horsemen from Khachen escorted the body, and mourners included Armenians, Russians and Muslims. He was buried in the gavit of Gandzasar beside his uncles Hovhannes and Sargis. Muratsan, who wrote 23 years after Baghdasar's death, says he never left a case unfinished and was never defeated in the lawsuits he opened, and that the authorities of his day respected him. He adds that Mehdi-Kuli-khan honoured him until his own death.

== Sources ==
- Muratsan (1880). Բաղդասար Մետրոպօլիտ Հասան-Ջալալեանց համառօտ կենսագրութիւն [Brief biography of Metropolitan Baghdasar Hasan-Jalaleants] (PDF). Փորձ [Pordz] (in Armenian) (5). Tiflis: 131–164.
- Raffi (1991). «Меликства Хамсы» - классический труд по истории Арцах-Карабаха (1600-1827 гг.). [The Melikdoms of Khamsa - a classic work on the history of Artsakh-Karabakh (1600-1827).] (in Russian). Translated by Ghazaryan, L.M. Yerevan: Nairi.
- Petoyan, Styopa (2022). "The Book Publishing Activities of the Basel Evangelical Missionary Society in Shushi in the 20s–30s of the 19th Century" (PDF). Գիտական տեղեկագիր (in Armenian and English) (1): 186–194.
- O'Flynn, Thomas S. R. (2017). The Western Christian Presence in the Russias and Qājār Persia, c. 1760 – c. 1870. Leiden: Brill. doi:10.1163/9789004313545.
- Maghalyan, Artak (2012). Арцахские меликства и меликские дома в XVII–XIX вв. (in Russian).
