= Igrar Aliyev =

Azerbaijani historian (1924-2004)

Igrar Aliyev

Igrar Habib oglu Aliyev (Azerbaijani: Əliyev İqrar Həbib oğlu; 14 March 1924, in Baku, Azerbaijan SSR – 11 June 2004, in Baku, Azerbaijan) was a Soviet and Azerbaijani historian. Aliyev was the author of 160 peer-reviewed journal publications and books. Many of his books are devoted to the Medes and Median Empire. Among his writings are: "The History of Media"(Baku, 1960), "A Historical Survey of Atropatena" (Baku, 1989), and "History of Azerbaijan (Baku, 1993, and in Russian, 1995). "Nagorno Karabakh: History, Facts, and Events", No. 22-34 (Baku, 1982), "On Problems Related to the Ethnic History of the Azerbaijani People" (Baku, 2002), and "The History of Aturpatakan" (also translated into Persian, published in Iran in 1999).

Aliyev was a director of the Institute of History of the National Academy of Sciences of Azerbaijan. He followed the methodology of the world-famous Soviet academician V. V. Struve, who was a leading specialist in the field of ancient Oriental studies. Aliyev knew ancient dead languages, including Sumerian, Akkadian and Old Persian. His works specialized in ancient Media, Atropatena, and Caucasian Albania were referenced in relevant Iranian fields.

== Controversy ==
A pamphlet written in 1997 on architecture in Nagarno Karabakh by Aliyev and Kamil Mamedzade, the two authors, also asserted that the celebrated thirteenth-century Gandzasar monastery, built by the Armenian prince Hasan-Jalal Dawla, was built by Caucasian Albanians. The pamphlet, which refers to the Armenians of Karabakh as "so-called Armenians" because of their alleged descent from the purported Albanian population of the region and which others have pointed out fails properly to show readers the medieval Armenian inscriptions of the monastery, goes on to claim:

The indisputable conclusion follows from everything said above that the so-called Armenians of Karabakh and the Azerbaijanis as such (who are the descendants of the Albanian population) of northern Azerbaijan share the same mother. Both of them are completely indisputably former Albanians and therefore the Armenians as such [original emphasis] on the territory of Nagorny Karabakh, into which they surged in huge numbers after the first quarter of the nineteenth century, have no rights.

== Works ==
- The History of Media, Baku, 1960. (Also translated into Persian, published in Iran)
- The Survey of History of Atropatene, Baku, 1989.
- Nagorny Karabakh: history, facts, events. "Elm", Baku, no. 22-34, 1982.
- The History of Azerbaijan, Baku, 1993
- (in Russian) The History of Azerbaijan, Baku, 1995.
- The History of Aturpatakan. (Also translated into Persian, published in Iran)
- The History of Azerbaijan, 1st volume of seven.
