= Kmkadzor, Nagorno-Karabakh =

Kmkadzor / Megrelalay Քմքաձոր / Meqrelalay
- Location within Azerbaijan
- Coordinates: 40°14′40.6″N 46°44′12.6″E
- Country: Azerbaijan
  - District: Aghdara

Population (2015)
  - Total: 116
- Time zone: UTC+4 (AZT)

Kmkadzor (Armenian: Քմքաձոր) or Megrelalay (Azerbaijani: Meqrelalay) is a village that is located in the Aghdara District of Azerbaijan, in the region of Nagorno-Karabakh. Until 2023 it was controlled by the breakaway Republic of Artsakh. The village had an ethnic Armenian-majority population until the expulsion of the Armenian population of Nagorno-Karabakh by Azerbaijan following the 2023 Azerbaijani offensive in Nagorno-Karabakh.

== Toponymy ==
The village was known as Mingrelsk (Russian: Мингрельск) during the Soviet period.

== History ==
During the Soviet period, the village was part of the Mardakert District of the Nagorno-Karabakh Autonomous Oblast.

== Economy and culture ==
The population is mainly engaged in agriculture, animal husbandry, and mining. The village is part of the community of Maghavuz.

== Demographics ==
The village had 75 inhabitants in 2005, and 116 inhabitants in 2015.
