= Mirza Yusuf Nersesov =

Armenian historian, writer, and translator

- Հովսեփ Ներսիսյանց
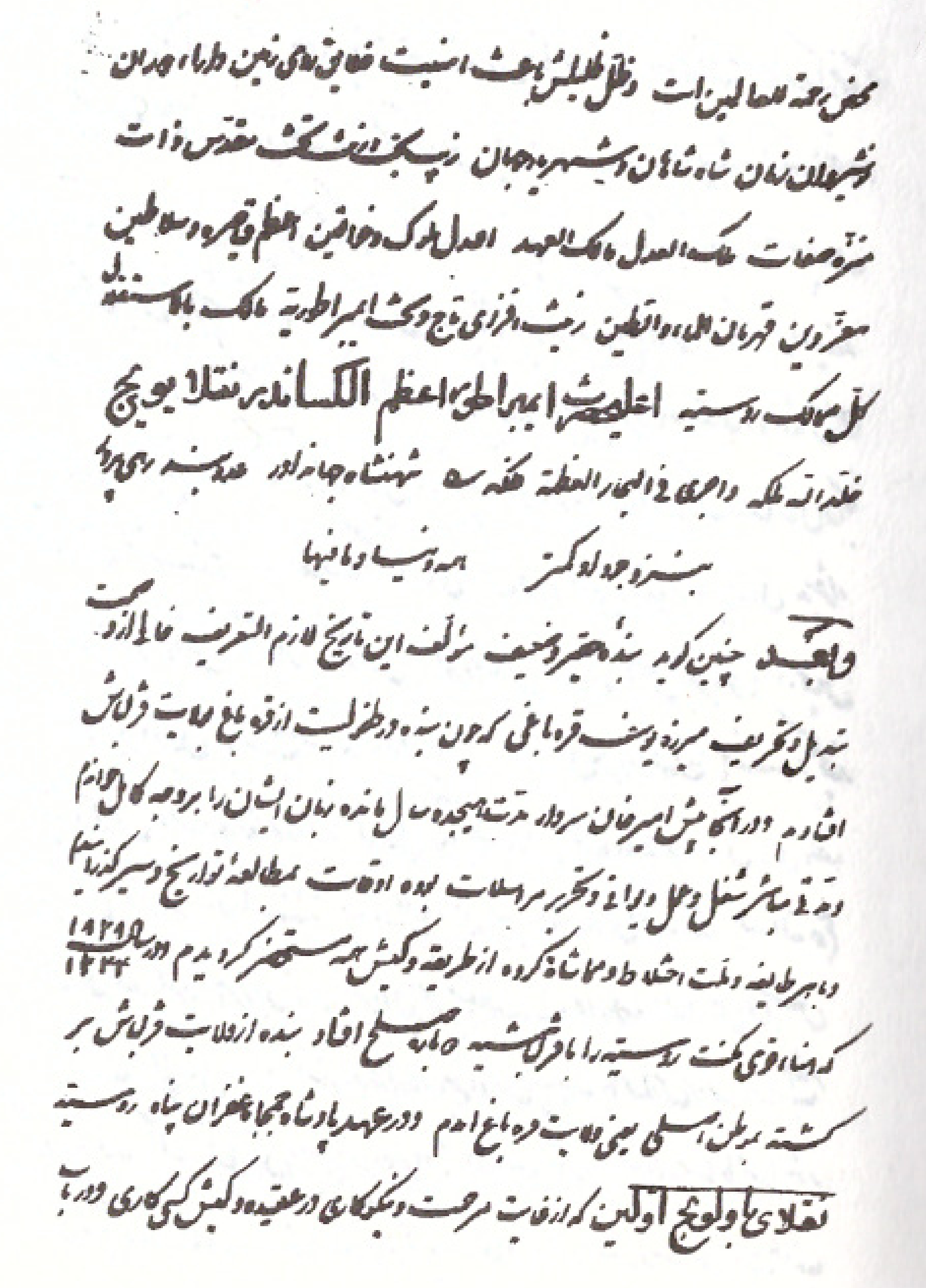
- Photocopy of an excerpt from the Tarikh-i Safi of Mirza Yusuf Nersesov, located in the Georgian National Center of Manuscripts
- Born: Hovsep Nerseseants; 1798; Hadrut, Karabakh Khanate, Qajar Iran
- Died: 1864 (aged 65–66)
- Writing career
- Notable work: Tarikh-е Safi

Mirza Yusuf Nersesov was an Armenian historian, translator, and scribe principally known for his Persian-language historical work regarding his native Karabakh, the Tarikh-i Safi ("A Truthful History").

== Life ==
Born as Hovsep Nerseseants, Mirza Yusuf belonged to a Christian Armenian family that originated in Ahar in Iran. He was born in 1798 in Hadrut, a village located in the Karabakh Khanate of Qajar Iran. When he was 8–9 years old, he was taken to mainland Iran by Iranian bandits. There he was handed to the shah (king), under whom he converted to Islam and was trained to become a secretary. Persian, Turkish, and Arabic were all taught to him. He eventually started working as a scribe under Amir Khan Sardar, the uncle of the crown prince Abbas Mirza. Mirza Yusuf served in Amir Khan Sardar's army when it attacked Karabakh during the Russo-Persian War of 1826–1828.

Following the end of the war, Mirza Yusuf went back to Karabakh, where he was converted back to Christianity by Archbishop Baghdasar Hasan-Jalalian. This led to the end of his relationship with his first wife—Tabriz-born Muslim—as she refused to convert. Mirza Yusuf's second wife was an Armenian woman named Shoghakat, whom he had five children with. In the Armenian school of Shusha, Mirza Yusuf taught Turkish and Persian. He was unsuccessful in his attempt to start a private school. Mirza Yusuf moved to Daghestan in 1853, where he worked as a translator for Grigol Orbeliani, the commander-in-chief of the Russian Northern Daghestan army. With D. Georgadze as his assistant, Mirza Yusuf composed the Tarikh-i Safi ("A Truthful History") under the orders of Grigol Orbeliani. Written in Persian, the book provides a comprehensive history of the wars between Russia and Iran, the Muslim khans of Karabakh, and the Armenian melikdoms in Karabakh. The book incorporates a few passages from the Karabakh-name by Adigozal Beg. However, he attempts to avoid the unnecessary details and exaggerations of Mirza Jamal Javanshir and Adigozal Beg by titling his book "A Truthful History."

For Hakob Lazariants, a Russian army officer stationed in Daghestan, Mirza Yusuf put together an updated version of the Darband namah ("History of Derbent"). The book covers the history of the rulers of the Sasanian Empire, the military campaigns of the Arabs, and the development of Islam in Daghestan up until 1064. Mirza Yusuf also authored a book of Turkish poetry and was skilled in duplicating Persian manuscripts.

Mirza Yusuf died in 1864.

== Sources ==
- Bournoutian, George (2004). Two chronicles on the history of Karabagh : Mirza Jamal Javanshir's Tarikh-e Karabagh and Mirza Adigözal Beg's Karabagh-name. Mazda Publishers. ISBN 978-1568591797.
- Bournoutian, George (2016). The 1820 Russian Survey of the Khanate of Shirvan: A Primary Source on the Demography and Economy of an Iranian Province prior to its Annexation by Russia. Gibb Memorial Trust. ISBN 978-1909724808.
- Kostikyan, Kristine (2017). Catalogue of Persian Manuscripts in the Matenadaran (PDF). Matenadaran.
