= Tonashen =

Tonashen Տոնաշեն
- Təpəkənd
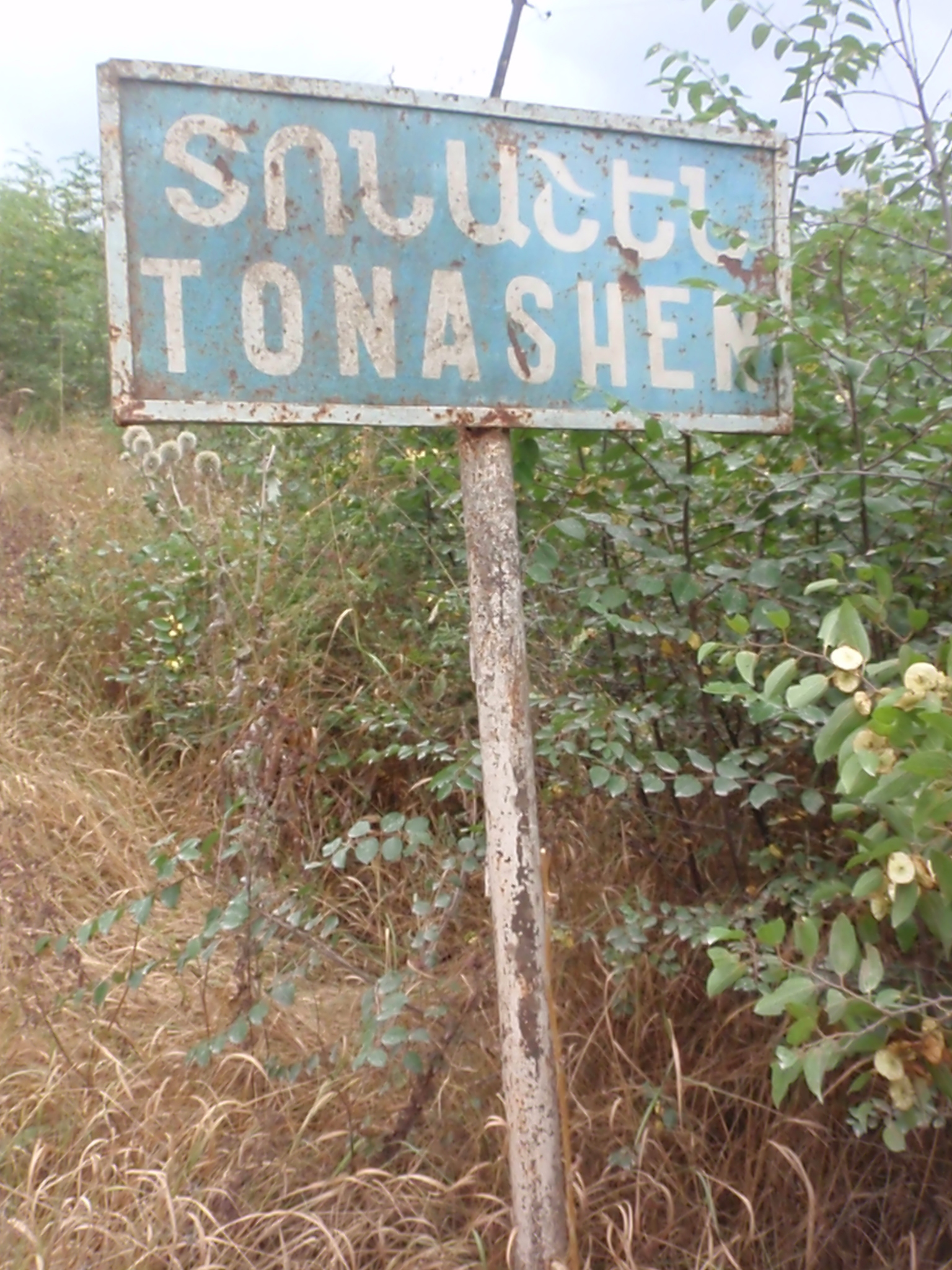
- Village entrance, 2011

- Location within Azerbaijan Location within Karabakh Economic Region
- Coordinates: 40°18′10″N 46°41′26″E
- Country: Azerbaijan
  - District: Aghdara

Population (2015)
  - Total: 84
- Time zone: UTC+4 (AZT)

Tonashen (Armenian: Տոնաշեն; Azerbaijani: Tonaşen) or Tapakend (Azerbaijani: Təpəkənd) is a village in the Aghdara District of Azerbaijan, in the region of Nagorno-Karabakh. Until 2023 it was controlled by the breakaway Republic of Artsakh. The village had an ethnic Armenian-majority population until the expulsion of the Armenian population of Nagorno-Karabakh by Azerbaijan following the 2023 Azerbaijani offensive in Nagorno-Karabakh.

== History ==
During the Soviet period, the village was a part of the Mardakert District of the Nagorno-Karabakh Autonomous Oblast.

== Historical heritage sites ==
Historical heritage sites in and around the village include the fortress of Jraberd (Armenian: Ջրաբերդ) from between the 9th and 18th centuries, a medieval church, a 12th/13th-century cemetery, a 13th-century khachkar, the medieval village of Mets Tvot (Armenian: Մեծ Թթոտ), the 13th-century church of Kotrats Yeghtsi (Armenian: Կոտրած եղցի), and the monastery of Yerits Mankants (Armenian: Երից Մանկանց) built in 1691.

== Economy and culture ==
The population is mainly engaged in agriculture and animal husbandry. As of 2015, the village has a municipal building, a secondary school, and a medical centre.

== Demographics ==
The village had 79 inhabitants in 2005, and 84 inhabitants in 2015.
