= Maghavuz, Nagorno-Karabakh =

Maghavuz / Chardagly Մաղավուզ / Çardaqlı
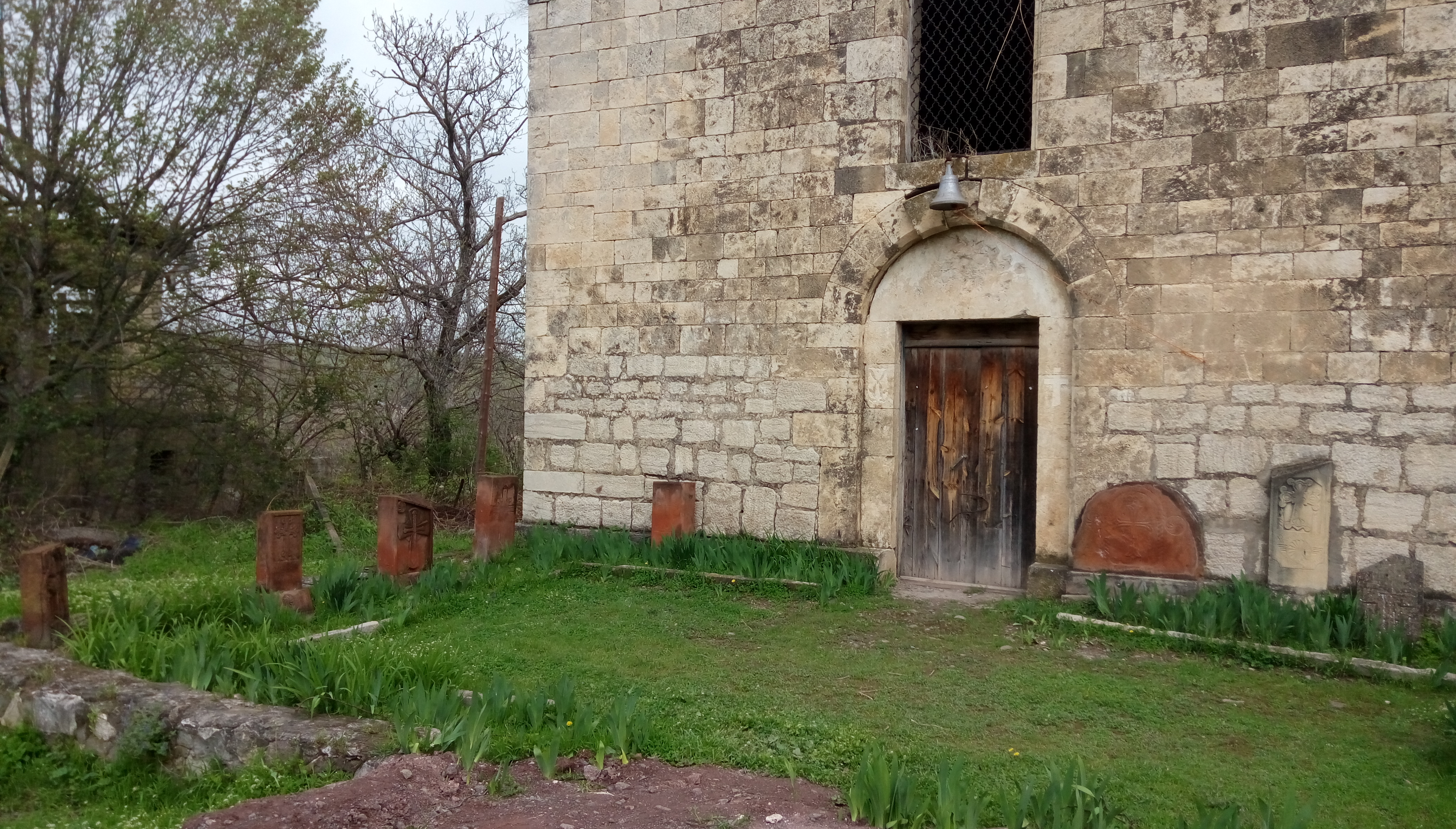
- St. George's Church in Maghavuz

- Location within Azerbaijan
- Coordinates: 40°15′04″N 46°41′55″E
- Country: Azerbaijan
  - District: Aghdara

Population (2015)
  - Total: 540
- Time zone: UTC+4 (AZT)

Maghavuz (Armenian: Մաղավուզ) or Chardagly (Azerbaijani: Çardaqlı) is a village located in the Aghdara District of Azerbaijan, in the disputed region of Nagorno-Karabakh. Until 2023 it was controlled by the breakaway Republic of Artsakh. The village had an ethnic Armenian-majority population until the expulsion of the Armenian population of Nagorno-Karabakh by Azerbaijan following the 2023 Azerbaijani offensive in Nagorno-Karabakh.

== History ==
During the Soviet period, the village was part of the Mardakert District of the Nagorno-Karabakh Autonomous Oblast.

== Historical heritage sites ==
Historical heritage sites in and around the village include a medieval village, a chapel built in 1260, a 13th-century khachkar, and the 19th-century St. George's Church (Armenian: Սուրբ Գևորգ եկեղեցի, romanized: Surb Gevorg Yekeghetsi).

== Economy and culture ==
The population is mainly engaged in agriculture, animal husbandry, and mining. As of 2015, the village has a municipal building, a secondary school, three shops, and a medical centre. The community of Maghavuz includes the village of Kmkadzor.

== Demographics ==
The village had 468 inhabitants in 2005, and 540 inhabitants in 2015.
