= Gandzasar monastery =

Fortified Armenian monastery on a mountain

- Գանձասարի վանք
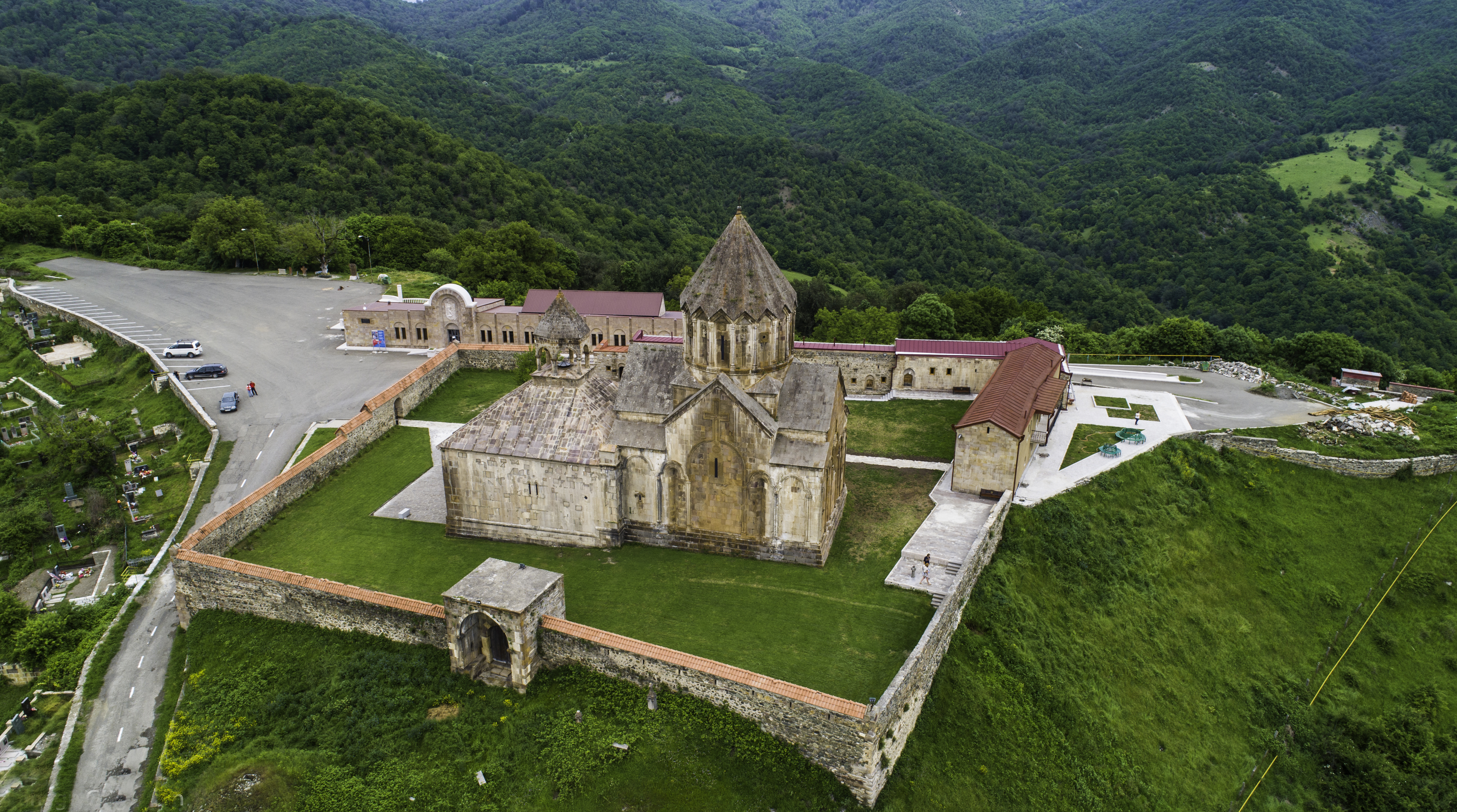
- Aerial view of the monastery in 2018

- Location within Azerbaijan

Religion
- Affiliation: Armenian Apostolic Church
- Rite: Armenian
- Year consecrated: July 22, 1240
- Status: Active

Location
- Location: near Vank, Kalbajar, Azerbaijan
- Coordinates: 40.0572862°N 46.5305449°E

Architecture
- Style: Armenian
- Groundbreaking: 1216
- Completed: 1238

Specifications
- Length: church: 12.3 metres (40 ft) gavit: 11.8 metres (39 ft)
- Width: church։ 17.75 metres (58.2 ft) gavit: 13.25 metres (43.5 ft)

Gandzasar (Armenian: Գանձասար) (Note: Sometimes transliterated as Gandsasar, Gantsasar.) is a 13th-century Armenian Apostolic cathedral (historically a monastery) near the village of Vank, in the region of Nagorno-Karabakh, Azerbaijan. It has historically been the most important church of Artsakh (Nagorno-Karabakh) since its foundation. One of the finest pieces of Armenian architecture of the mid-1200s, the building is best known among scholars for its richly decorated dome.

In Azerbaijan, where it is referred to as "Ganjasar" (Azerbaijani: Gəncəsər), the history of the monastery is falsified. Azerbaijan authorities deny its Armenian heritage and instead call it a "Caucasian Albanian temple."

== History ==
=== Background ===
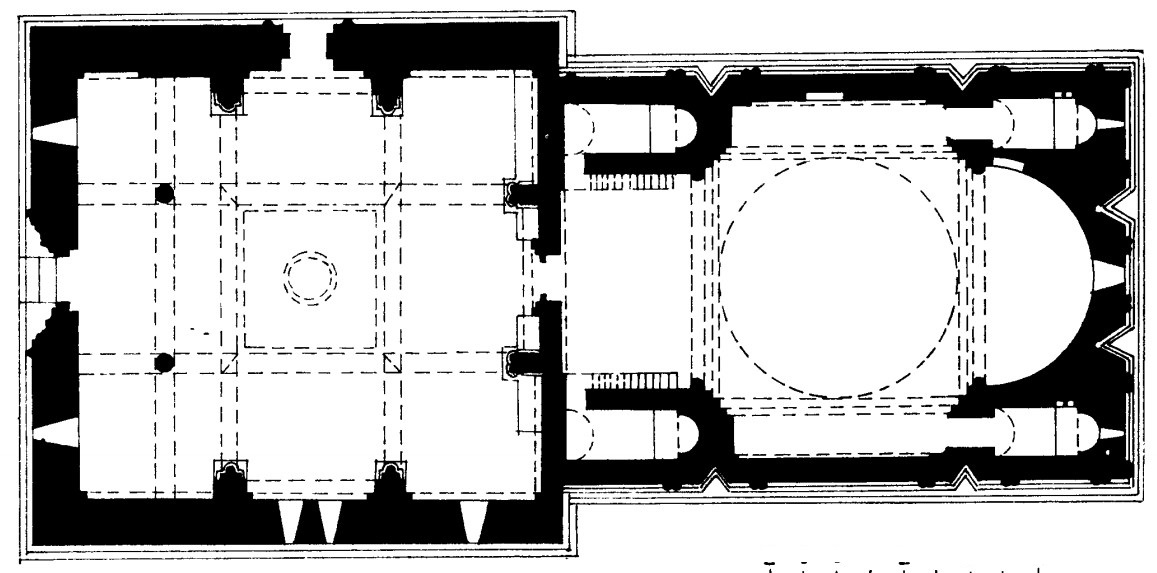
Plan of Gandzasar monastery, with the zhamatun (built 1261) and the church (built in 1216-1238).

The name Gandzasar, which means "treasure mountain" in Armenian, is believed to have originated from the tradition that the monastery was built on a hill containing ores of silver and other metals.

The site was first mentioned in written records by the tenth century Catholicos Anania of Moks (r. 946-968), who listed Sargis, a monk from Gandzasar, among the participants of a 949 council convened in Khachen to reconcile Chalcedonian and non-Chalcedonian Armenians. Khachkars dated 1174, 1182, and 1202 have been found around the monastery, which also point to the existence of a church or monastery at the site.

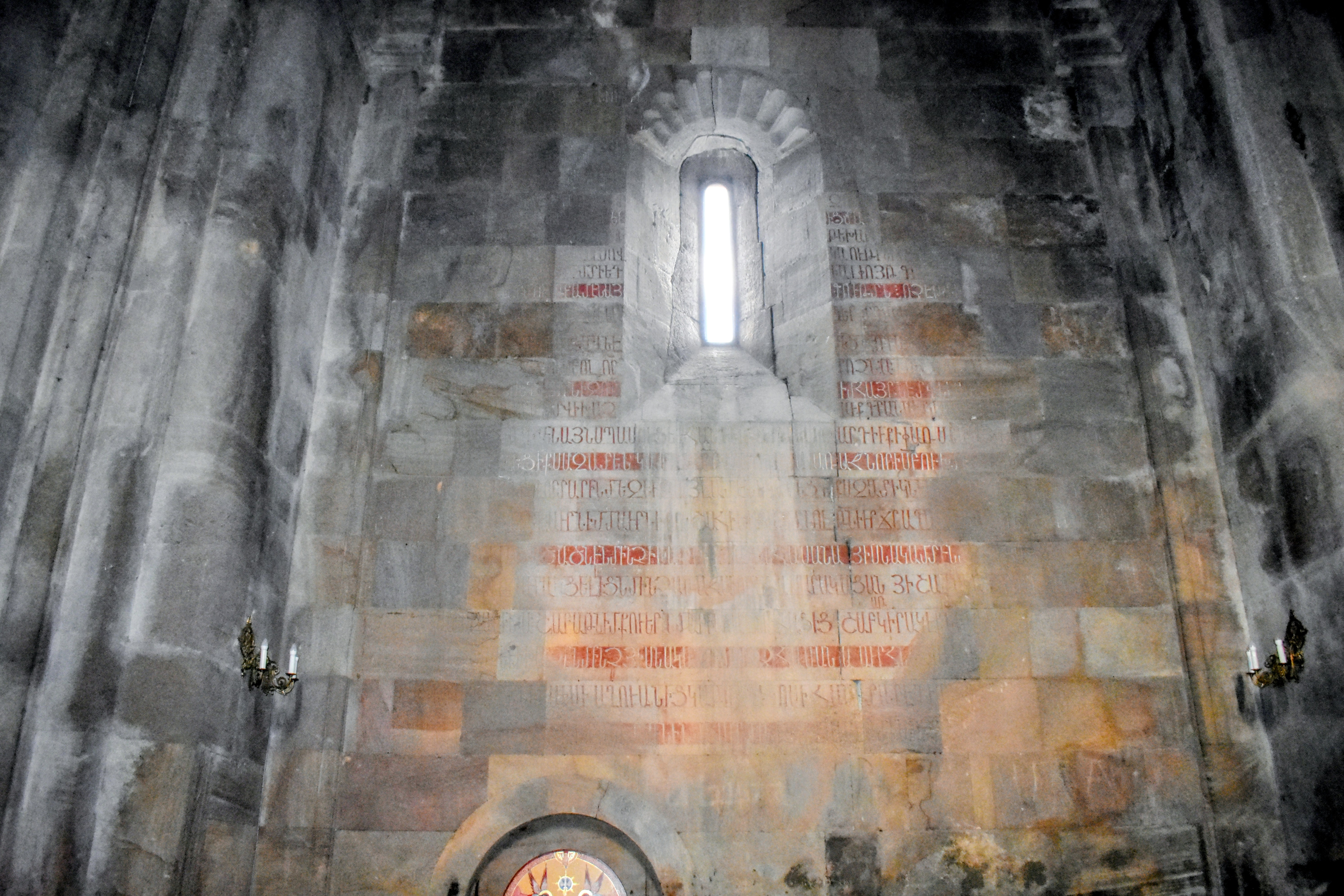
The foundation inscription in Armenian on the interior wall.

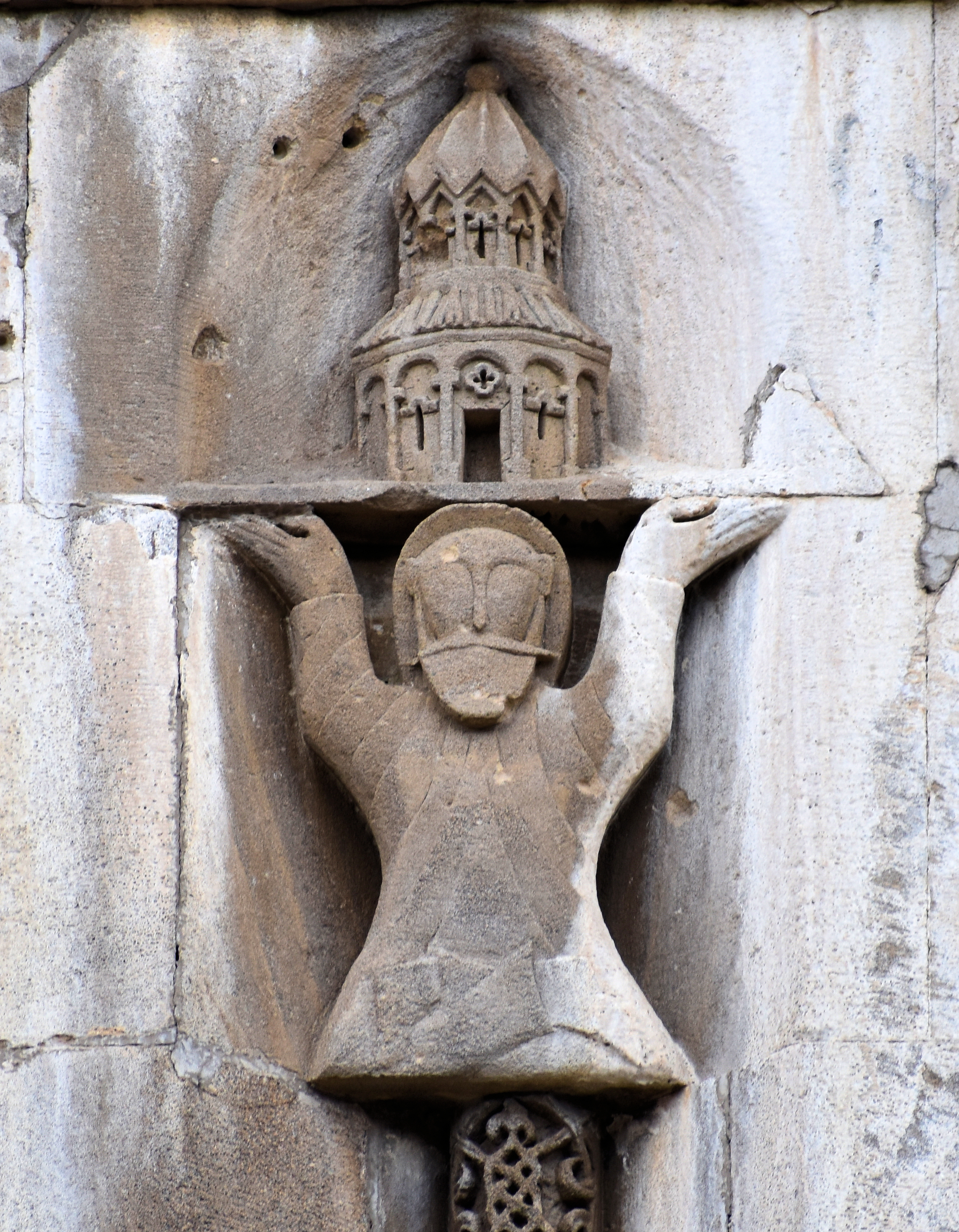
Depiction of Hasan-Jalal Dawla, Gandzasar monastery, 1238.

=== Foundation ===
The main church was built between 1216 and 1238 by Hasan-Jalal Dawla, the Armenian prince of Inner Khachen and the patriarch of the House of Hasan-Jalalyan. It was consecrated on July 22, 1240, on the Feast of the Transfiguration (Vardavar) in attendance of some 700 priests. The gavit (narthex), to the west of the church, was started in 1240 and completed in 1266 by Atabek, the son of Hasan-Jalal and his wife, Mamkan. Kirakos Gandzaketsi, a contemporary historian, described the construction of the church in his History of Armenia.

=== 14th-16th centuries ===
Gandzasar became the seat of the Catholicosate of (Caucasian) Albania, a see of the Armenian Apostolic Church, in the late 14th century. Rouben Paul Adalian considers the foundation of the see a result of an ancient bishopric seeking "ecclesiastical autonomy to compensate for the lack of control and communication from a central pontificate" and part of various local strategies in an Armenia dominated by foreign and Islamic rule to "preserve some semblance of religious authority among the people". In the 16th century it became subordinate to the Etchmiadzin catholicosate.

=== 17th-early 20th centuries ===
According to contemporary sources, in the early 1700s the patriarch of Gandzasar had authority over some 900 villages with hundreds of households in each, composed of peasant and merchant Armenians.

In the 17th and 18th centuries Gandzasar became the center in the liberation efforts by Karabakh Armenian meliks, who were united around Catholicos Yesayi Hasan-Jalalyan (d. 1728). He was staunchly pro-Russian and in a 1701 letter signed by Karabakh and Syunik meliks, he asked Peter the Great to protect Armenians from Muslims. However, it was not until the early 1800s that the Russian Empire took control of the region. The Karabakh Khanate eventually came under complete Russian control through the Treaty of Gulistan. Through the 1836 regulation by the Russian authorities, known as Polozhenie, Gandzasar ceased to be the seat of the diocese of Artsakh, which was moved to Shusha. It was gradually abandoned and became dilapidated by the late 19th century.

=== Soviet period ===
Gandzasar was closed down by the Soviet authorities no later than 1930. The diocese of Artsakh was reestablished in 1989. Archbishop Pargev Martirosyan was named its primate. Due to his efforts, Gandzasar reopened on October 1, 1989 after six months of renovations. The Soviet government had given permission, while that of Soviet Azerbaijan had not. Gandzasar became the first church to be reopened after decades of suppression. According to Zori Balayan several KGB agents "could [have been] spotted among the crowd attending." Gandzasar served as seat of the bishop before it was moved to Ghazanchetsots Cathedral in Shusha (Shushi) in 1998.

=== First Nagorno-Karabakh War ===
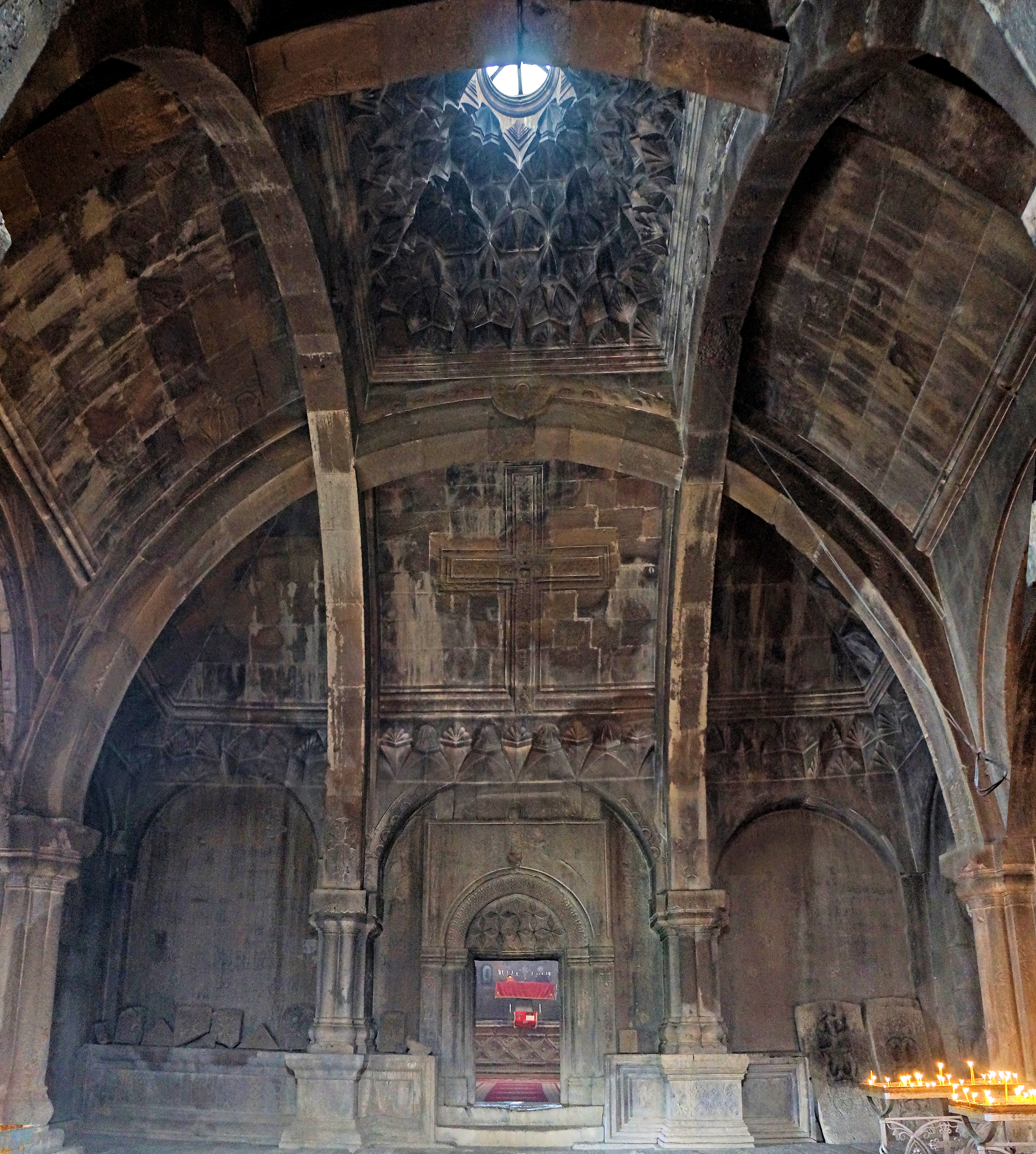
Zhamatun of Gandzasar Monastery, dedicated by Hasan-Jalal Dawla in 1261.

Gandzasar was attacked several times during the First Nagorno-Karabakh War. On July 6, 1991 Soviet soldiers and OMON (special police) officers raided Gandzasar allegedly in search of guns. They checked papers and conducted a thorough search, including in the graveyard.

Fierce fighting took place around Gandzasar in 1992, when Azerbaijan besieged the area. The Armenians broke the siege, which saved Gandzasar and enhanced its spiritual status, wrote Thomas de Waal. On August 16, 1992 some of the outlying buildings within the monastery complex were destroyed as a result of Azerbaijani bombardment by helicopters, which intentionally targeted the church. Corley writes that the attempted bombing of Gandzasar was not of any military importance and that its raid "appeared to be a deliberate attempt to attack the Armenian heritage in Karabakh."

On August 31, 1992 Armenia's Defense Minister Vazgen Sargsyan and Serzh Sargsyan, the head of the self-defense committee of Karabakh Armenians, convened the first meeting of the region's commanders in one of the monastic cells of Gandzasar.

On January 20, 1993 an air strike conducted by two Azerbaijani attack aircraft caused serious damage to the monastery, killed several people nearby and wounded a priest.

=== Restoration and revival ===
Following the war, the monastery was completely refurbished through the funding of Russia-based businessman and philanthropist Levon Hayrapetyan, a native of Vank. Restoration works, which lasted from 2000 to 2002, included restoration of the altar, gavit, and tiling of the floor. Hayrapetyan also funded the asphalting of the road leading to the church. Some controversy surrounded the tiling of the wall around the monastery in 2011. It was funded by Hayrapetyan and carried out by a company owned by Vladimir Hayrapetyan, his younger brother. While Archbishop Pargev Martirosyan said the wall was not medieval and did not have much architectural significance, therefore tiling was justified, critics argued it was part of the historic complex.

On October 16, 2008 a mass wedding, sponsored by Levon Hayrapetyan took place in Karabakh. Some 700 couples got married on that day, 500 of whom married at Ghazanchetsots Cathedral in Shushi and 200 at Gandzasar. On April 13, 2016 Catholicos Karekin II and Catholicos of Cilicia Aram I delivered a prayer for peace and safety of Nagorno-Karabakh. It came days after the clashes between Armenian and Azerbaijani forces, which were the deadliest since the ceasefire of 1994. The monastery's 770th anniversary was commemorated in 2010 and the 777th anniversary in 2017.

It remained under Armenian control after the Second Nagorno-Karabakh War in 2020.

=== Azerbaijani control ===
Following the Azerbaijani offensive of September 19–20, 2023, Nagorno-Karabakh was dissolved and the entire population fled to Armenia. In early October 2023, a video posted online showed Azerbaijani police at the monastery. Simultaneously, Azerbaijan's State Service of Cultural Heritage issued a statement that claimed that the "Ganjasar monastery" is "one of the most prominent monuments of Christian architecture of Caucasian Albania". It claimed that under Armenian "occupation" it was "vandalized by Armenians" who carried out "illegal repair-restoration". Azerbaijani historian Rizvan Huseynov claimed the inscriptions have been "falsified." Armenian archaeologist and historian Hamlet Petrosyan and the organization Monument Watch responded to the claims. Armenia's representative to UNESCO, Christian Ter-Stepanian accused Azerbaijan of an attempt to "appropriate and distort the identity of Gandzasar, one of the most famous medieval Armenian monasteries." In a Time article, art historian Christina Maranci warned that its Armenian inscriptions, khachkars, and tombstones are endangered under Azerbaijani control.

In September 2026, Azerbaijani presidential aide Hikmet Hajiyev led foreign diplomats to the monastery, where he presented it as "an integral part of the ancient Albanian Christian heritage." The Armenian Church condemned Hajiyev's statements, describing them as "blatant falsification and an encroachment upon the historical memory and spiritual heritage of the Armenian people" and an "overt manifestation of the anti-Armenian policy pursued by Azerbaijan’s authorities." It also expressed regret that diplomats were "drawn into the dissemination of historical falsifications." Armenia's parliament speaker Ruben Rubinyan called his remarks "groundless" and not conducive to peace, while Prime Minister Nikol Pashinyan described Hajiyev's statements "unacceptable and incomprehensible", while suggesting that it is "pointless and unfeasible" to prove its Armenian origin to Azerbaijan. Following the visit, EU's Special Representative for the South Caucasus Magdalena Grono spoke of "deeply diverging views and narratives persist, for instance on origins of some sites", drawing criticism from Armenia. She later said that she did not "contest past Armenian presence and rich footprint in former conflict-affected areas in Karabakh."

Days later, members of the "Albanian-Udi Christian religious community" visited the monastery for a "familiarization" visit and to discuss "issues related to the preservation of the Albanian Christian heritage as well as the preservation of religious traditions." They also performed religious rites.

== Description ==
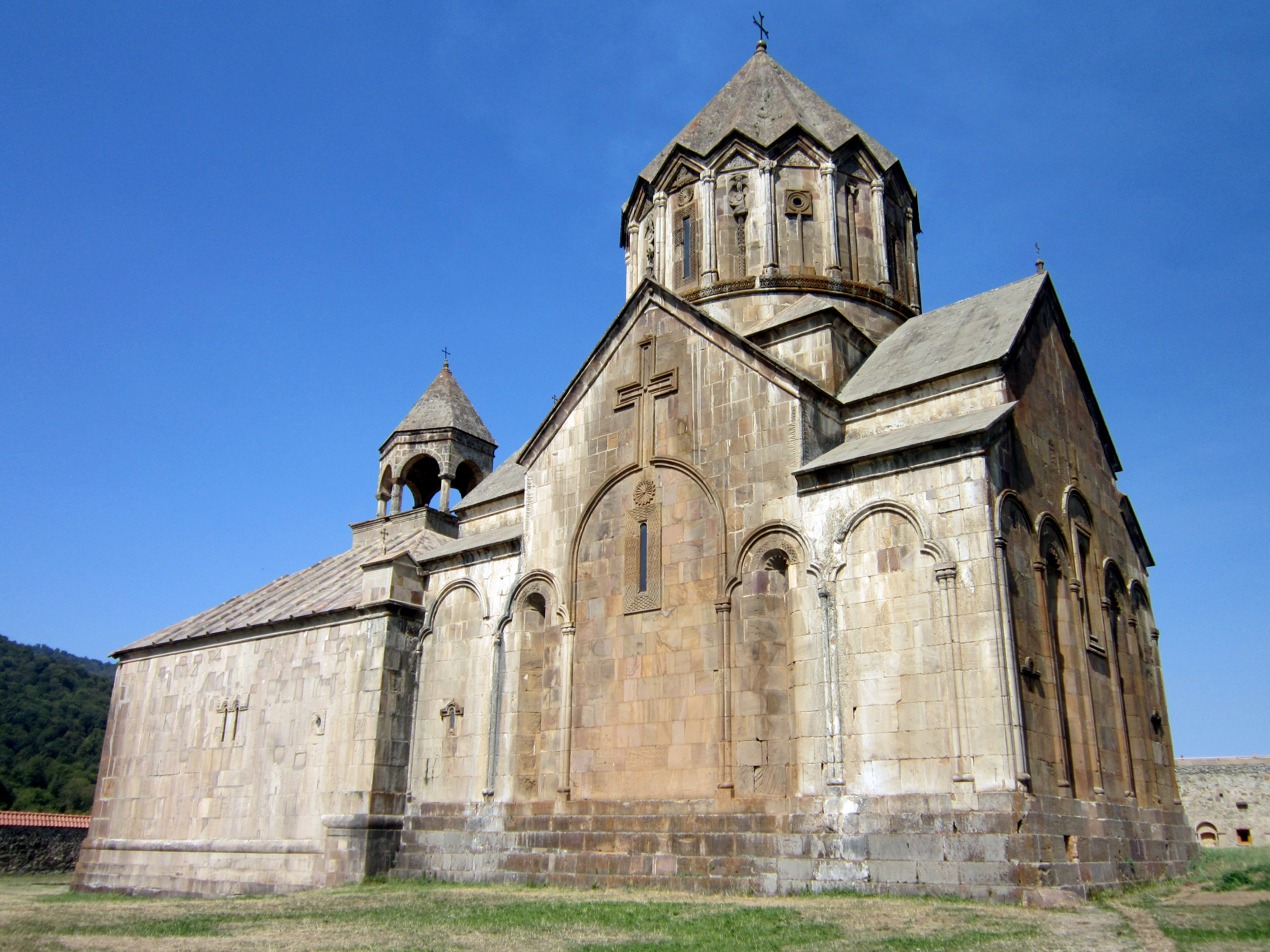
Gandzasar in 2017

The monastery is located atop a hill, at an altitude of 1,270 metres (4,170 ft), to the south-west of the village of Vank (Azerbaijani: Vəngli) in the province of Martakert. The walled monastery complex includes the church with its narthex (gavit), living quarters, bishop's residence, refectory, and a school building. The living quarters, located on the northern side contain eight cells (2.9 by 2.5 metres (9.5 ft × 8.2 ft)), were built in the 17th century. On the eastern side there is a refectory, built circa 1689. The two-floored school building was erected in 1898. To the south of the monastery walls is the old cemetery, where priests, bishops and notable laypeople (such as meliks) of the areas were buried.

Anatoli L. Yakobson called Gandzasar an "encyclopedia" of Armenian architecture, while Bagrat Ulubabyan and M. S. Asatryan described it as a "jewel".

The monastery consists of a narthex (gavit) and the main church, named for John the Baptist. The church's exterior dimensions are 12.3 by 17.75 metres (40.4 ft × 58.2 ft). The narthex or gavit, measured 11.8 by 13.25 metres (38.7 ft × 43.5 ft), is a square-plan hall with two columns near the eastern wall that support the roof. It is very similar to the gavit of the Holy Cross church of Haghpat Monastery. The portal on western facade of the gavit is richly decorated.

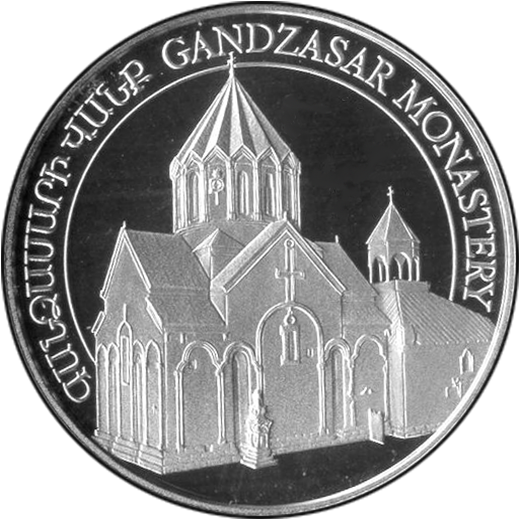
A 100 dram commemorative coin depicting the monastery, 2004.

The main church, named for John the Baptist, has a rectangular, cruciform plan with two-floored sacristies (chambers) on four corners. In its style, it is similar to the plans of the main churches of Geghard, Hovhannavank and Harichavank, also built in the 13th century.

The church is prominent for its richly decorated 16-sided cupola. The bas-reliefs on its exterior depict the Crucifixion of Jesus, Mary with baby Jesus, Adam and Eve, two ktetors (patrons) holding the model of the church, geometrical figures, such as rosettes, head of a bull and an eagle. The bas-reliefs have been compared to the elaborate carvings of Aghtamar.

The interior pendentives under the cylindrical dome in the interior are decorated with geometrical ornaments such as stars, circles and squares, plants such as spiral shoots, palmettes. Each side of the pendentive has high reliefs depicting head of a sheep, heads of a bull and anthropomorphic figures. According to Yakobson, sheep and bulls were considered holy animals in this period and are used as protectors of the structure.

== Significance ==
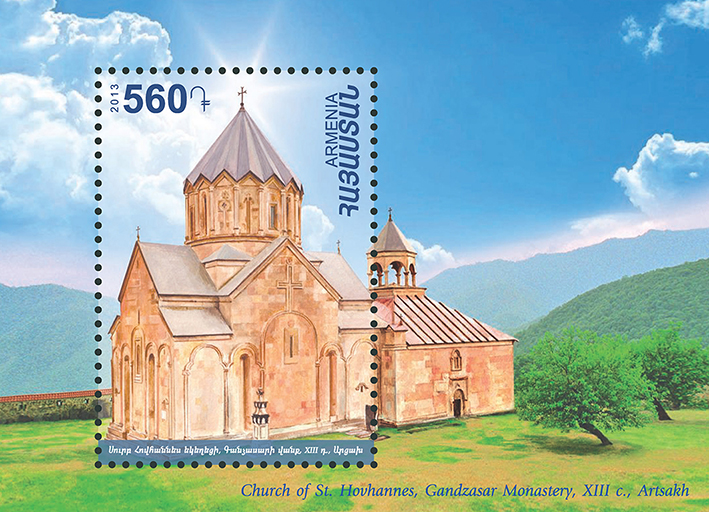
A 2013 Armenian stamp depicting Gandzasar.

Since its foundation the monastery was for centuries a center of education and manuscript production. It served as the burial place of Armenian princes of Khachen.

Gandzasar is the principal historic tourist attraction in all of Karabakh (Artsakh) and one of the top destinations overall. It is also a center of pilgrimage as the region's main historic cathedral both for Karabakh Armenians and tourists (of Armenian ancestry). Thomas de Waal noted as early as 1997 that Gandzasar, the most famous church in Karabakh, "has acquired a mythical status in Karabakh." Felix Corley wrote that it is, along with Ghazanchetsots Cathedral in Shushi (Shusha), a powerful symbol of history and identity of Karabakh Armenians regardless their religiosity.

=== Matenadaran branch ===
A branch of the Matenadaran, the Yerevan-based museum and research institute of manuscripts, was established at the monastery in 2015. During the 2020 Nagorno-Karabakh war, the more than one hundred manuscripts kept there were evacuated to Yerevan and displayed at the Yerevan Matenadaran in March 2021.

== Azerbaijani negationism ==
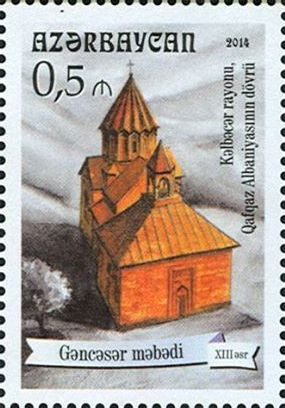
A 2014 Azerbaijani stamp representing the monastery as Caucasian Albanian.

In the 1970s, Soviet Azerbaijani historians, particularly Rashid Geyushev and Ziya Bunyadov, asserted a negationist theory that postulated that Gandzasar was a Caucasian Albanian monument. They based their claim on the fact that it was the seat of the Albanian Catholicosate of the Armenian Apostolic Church. This theory was adopted and promoted by other Azerbaijani historians, such as Davud Akhundov, and since been adopted by Azerbaijan's authorities. For instance, in 2017, Hikmet Hajiyev, Spokesman for the Azerbaijani Foreign Ministry, stated that Gandzasar is an "Albanian Christian temple, occupied by the Armenian armed forces in the Kalbajar region, is not Gandzasar, but Ganjasar, and has nothing to do with the Armenian Gregorian Church."

Historians who have challenged the Azerbaijani state version of the region's local history, including Victor Schnirelmann, note that Caucasian Albania disappeared in the 10th century, and that the Armenian Church simply adopted the name for its easternmost diocese out of tradition. Schnirelmann notes that Azerbaijani historians intentionally omit the fact that Gandzasar is a typical example of Armenian architecture of 10th-13th centuries, as well as the numerous Armenian inscriptions on its walls. Thomas de Waal noted that in a 1997 pamphlet titled "The Albanian Monuments of Karabakh" by Igrar Aliyev and Kamil Mamedzade "carefully left out all the Armenian writing" in the depiction of the façade of Gandzasar on its cover. Rouben Galichian notes that Gandzasar, though presented in Azerbaijan as supposedly an "Albanian-Azerbaijani" historic monastery and a part of Azerbaijan's cultural heritage, was left to decay under Azerbaijani control.

== Gallery ==
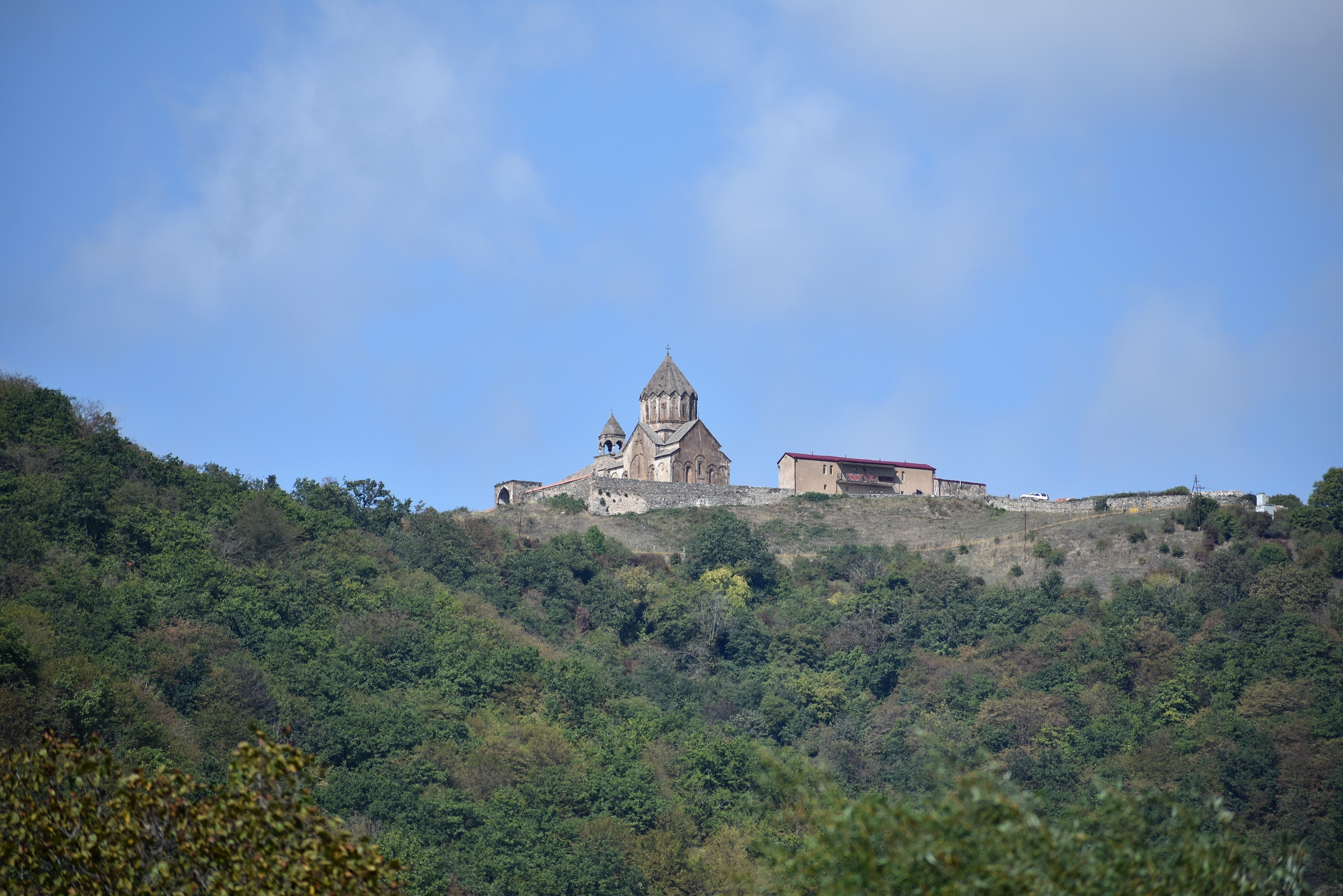
Monastery from the southeast

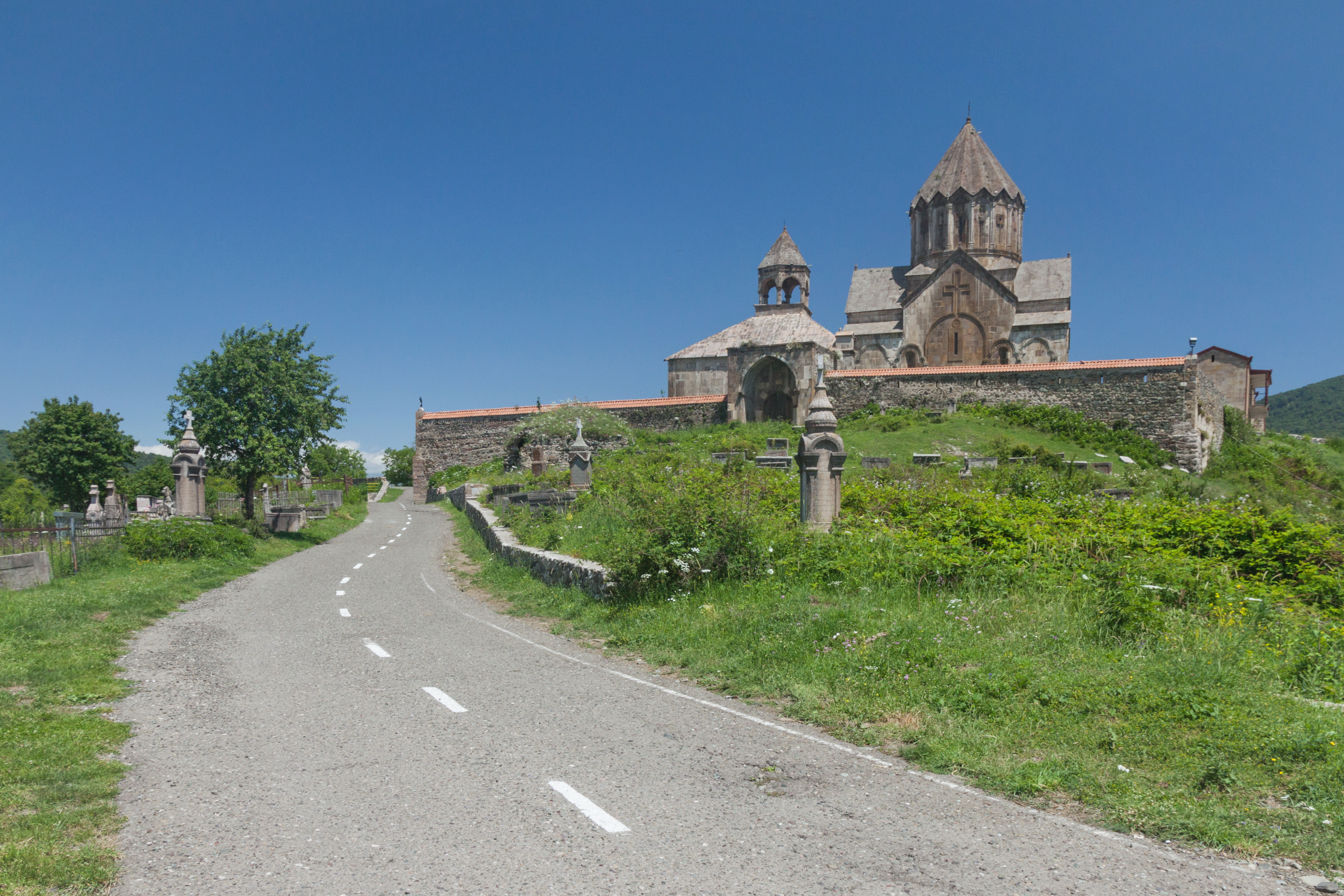
Monastery from the south

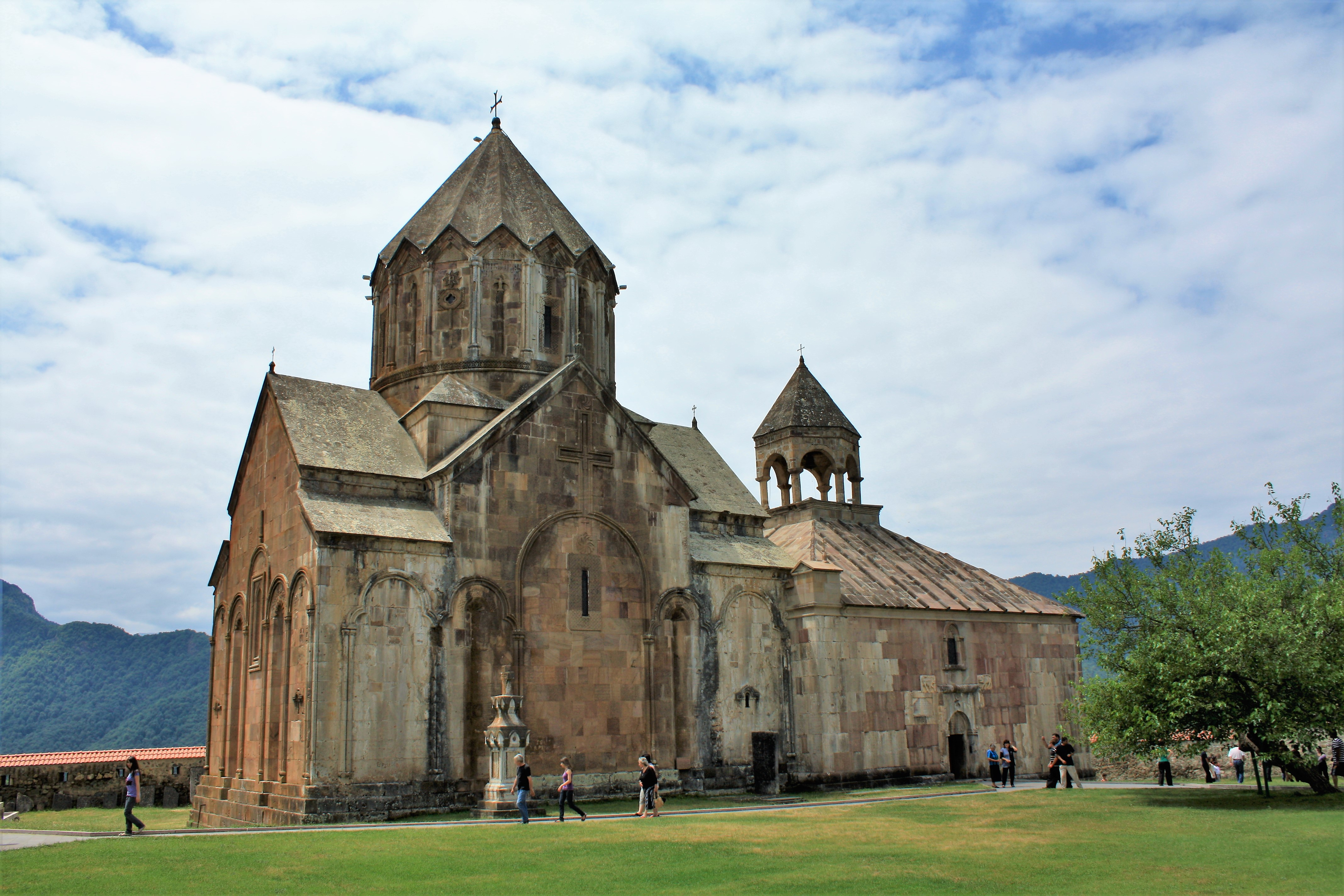
Church from the north

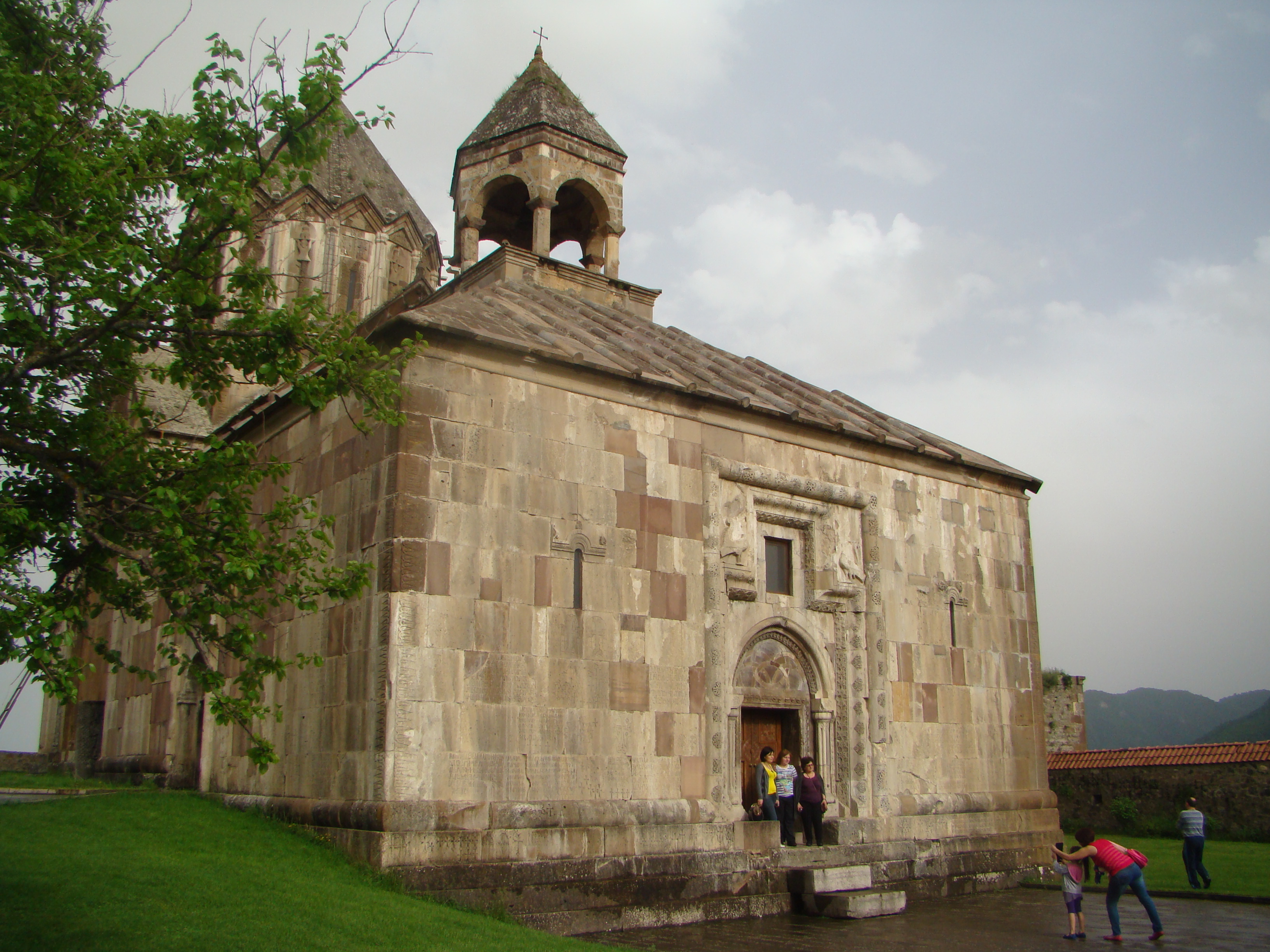
Church from the west

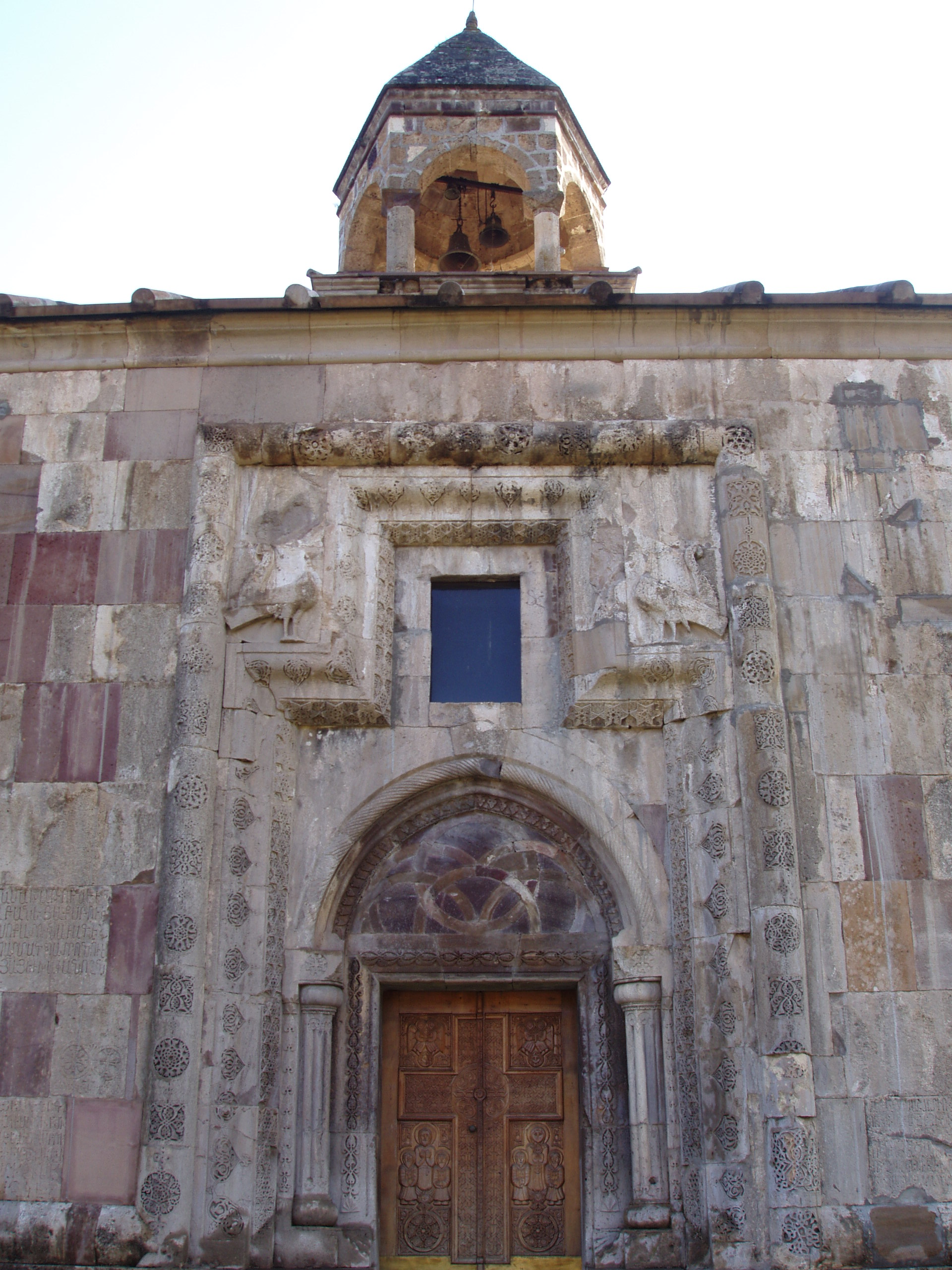
Church door, west facade

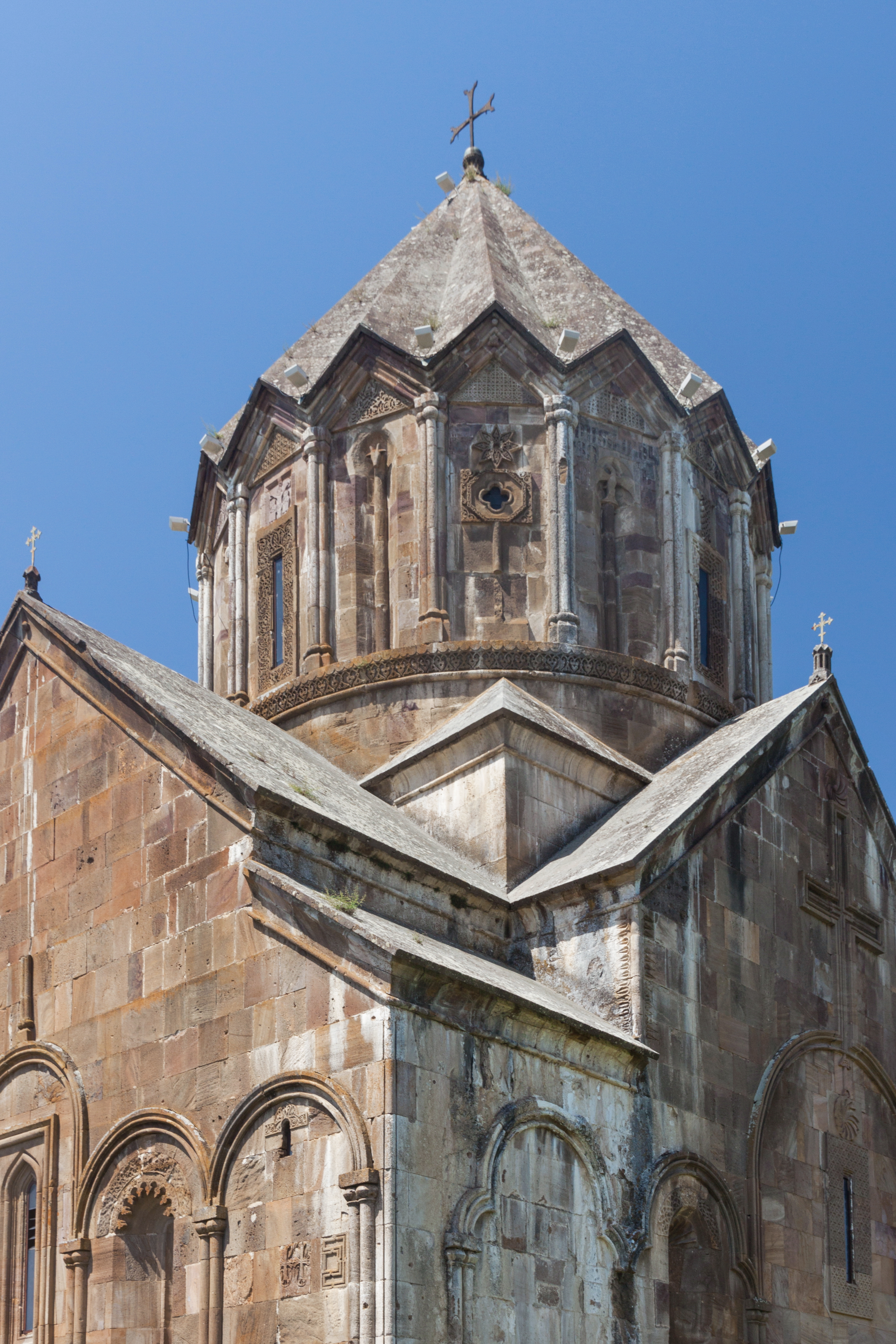
Church tower from the northeast

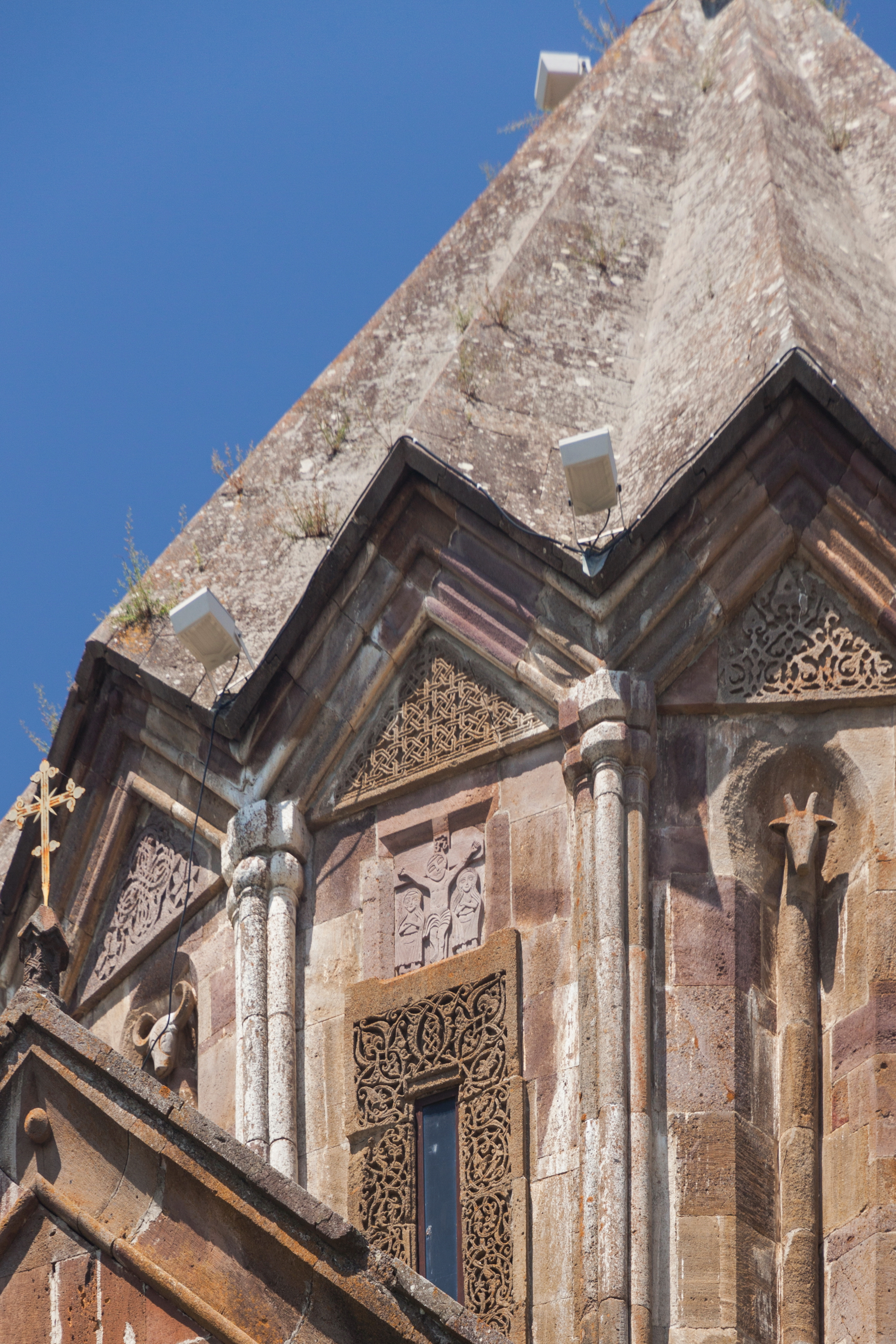
Church tower from the northeast, detail

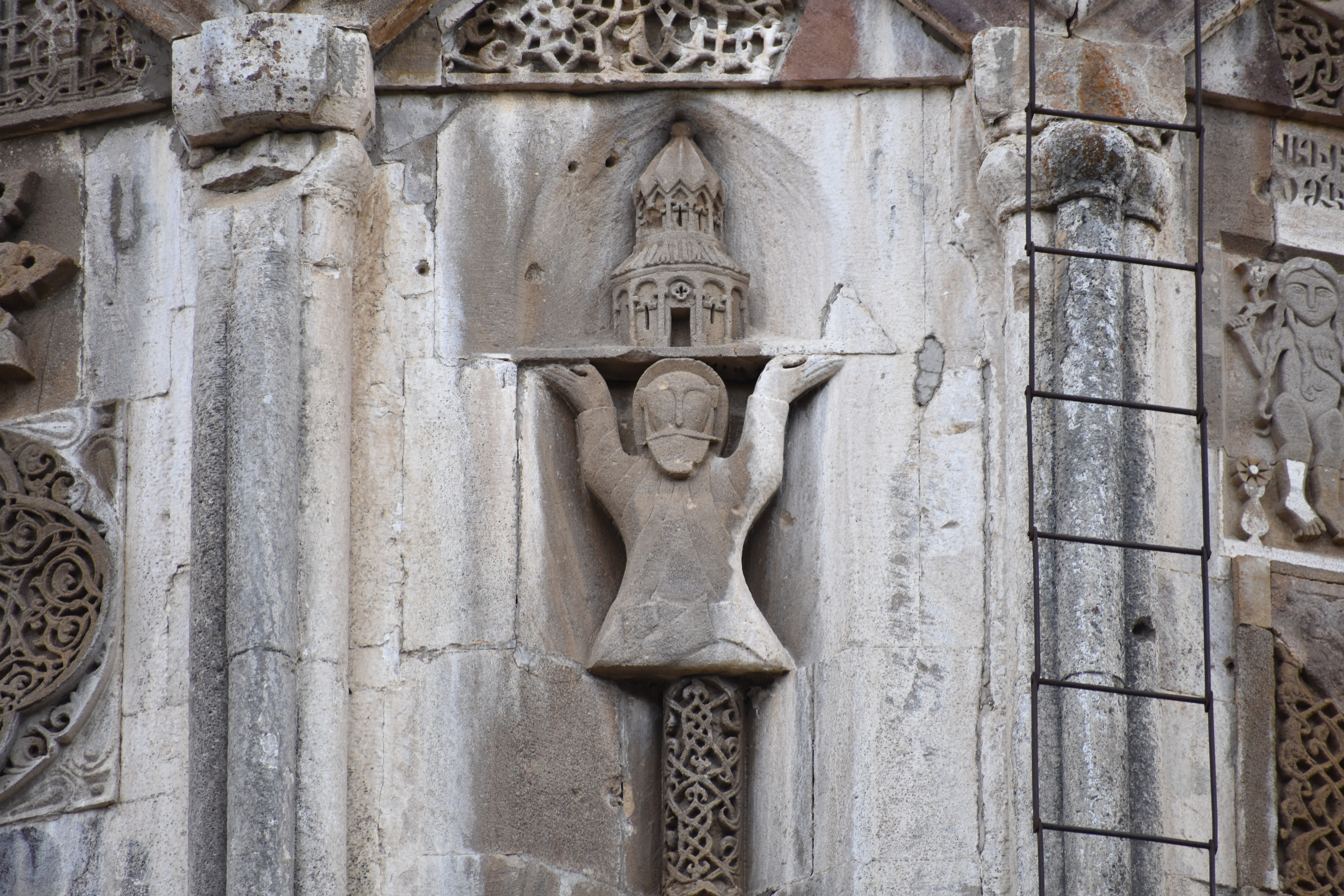
Church tower, Hasan-Jalal Dawla sculpture

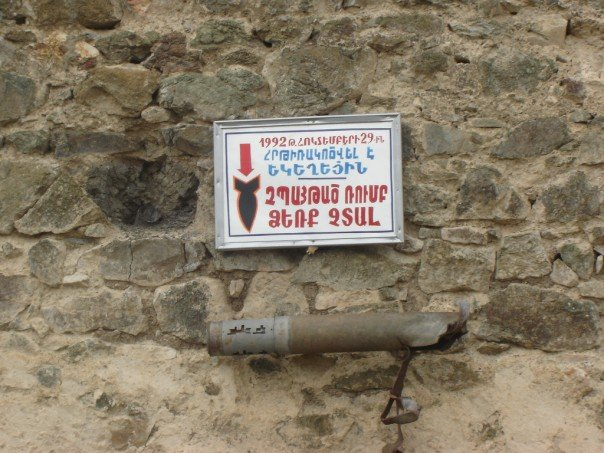
Ordnance from when the monastery was shelled by Azerbaijani forces on October 29, 1992.

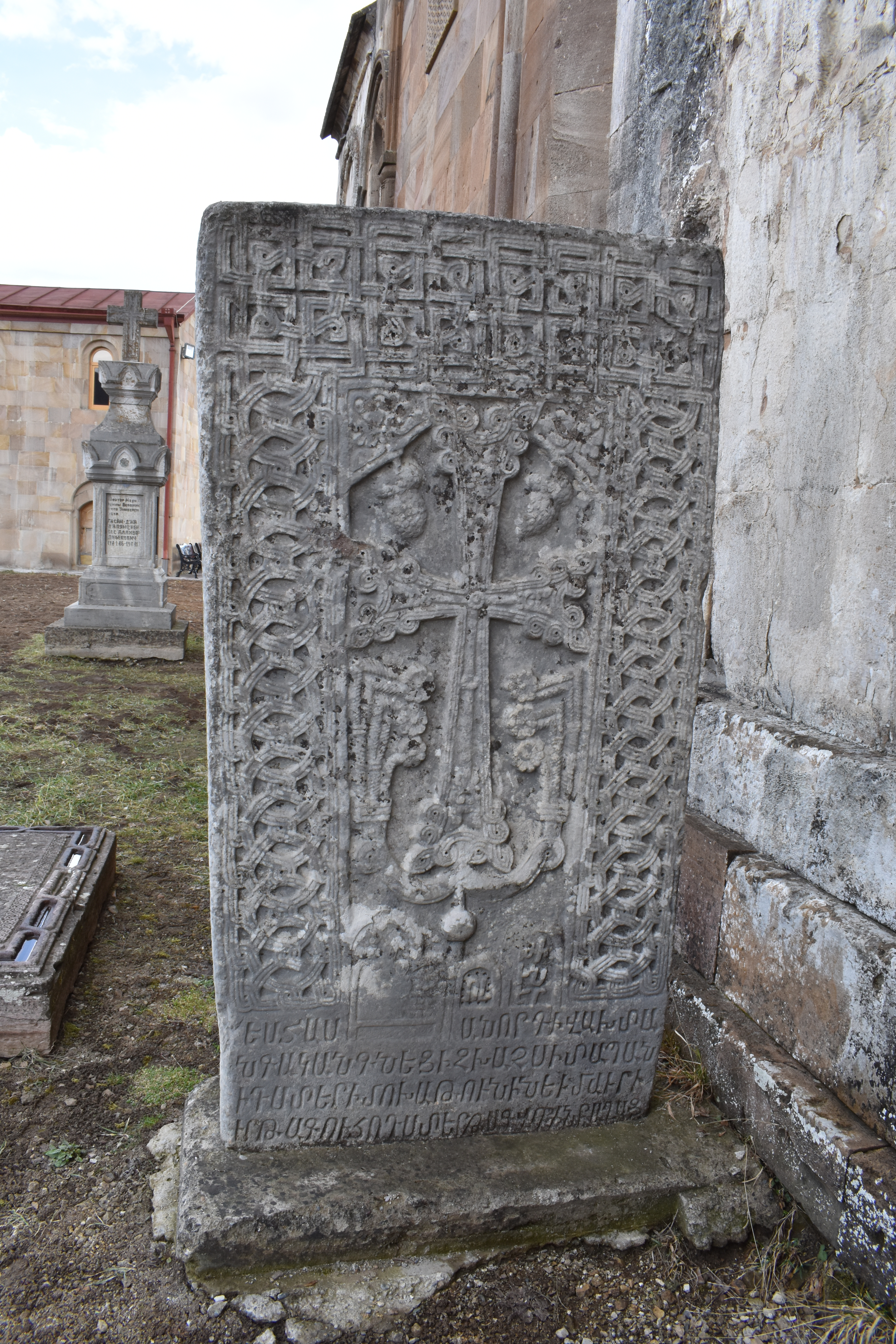
Khachkar of Hasan I, grandfather of Hasan-Jalal

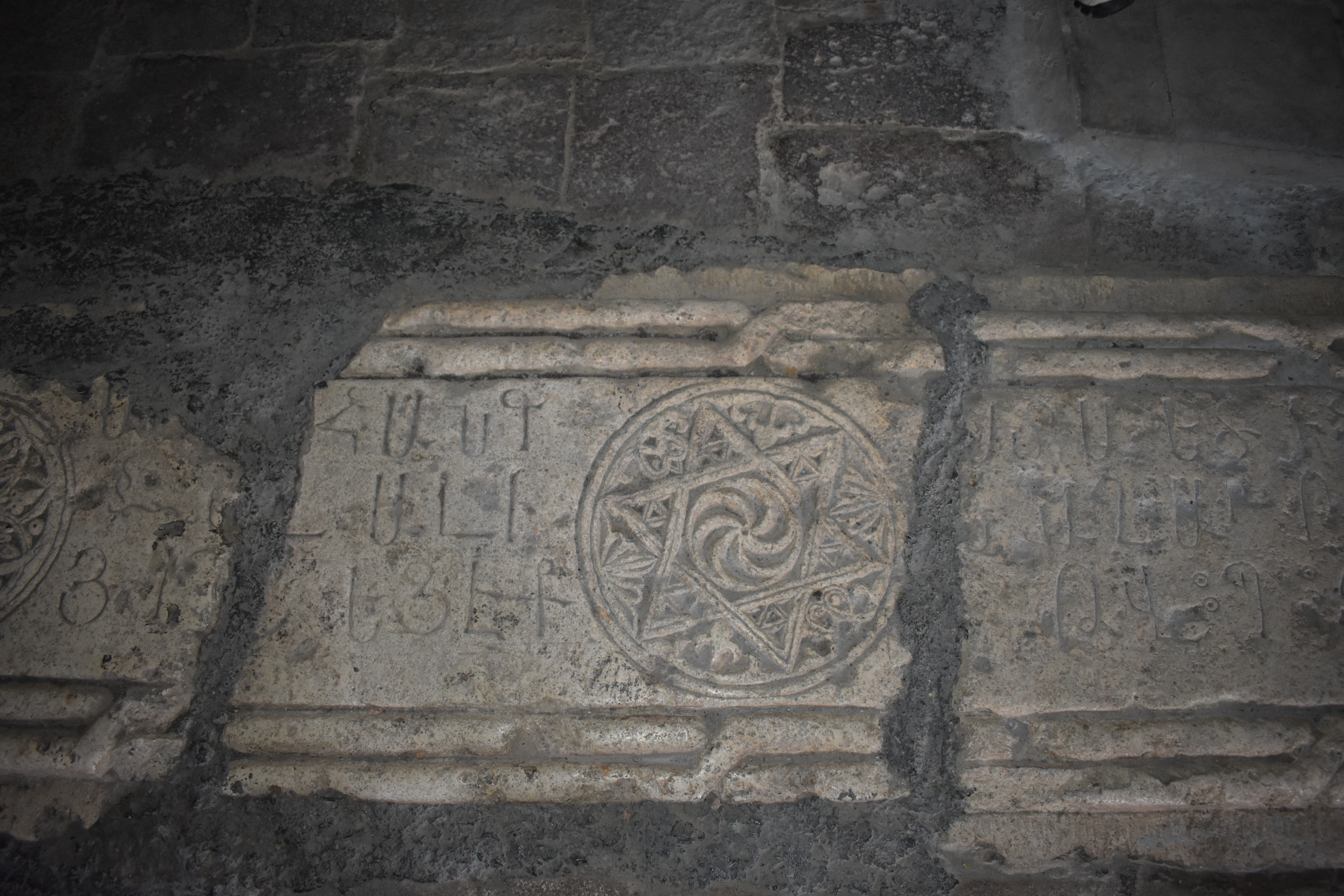
Church interior, gavit: marble tombstone of Hasan Jalal Vahtangian

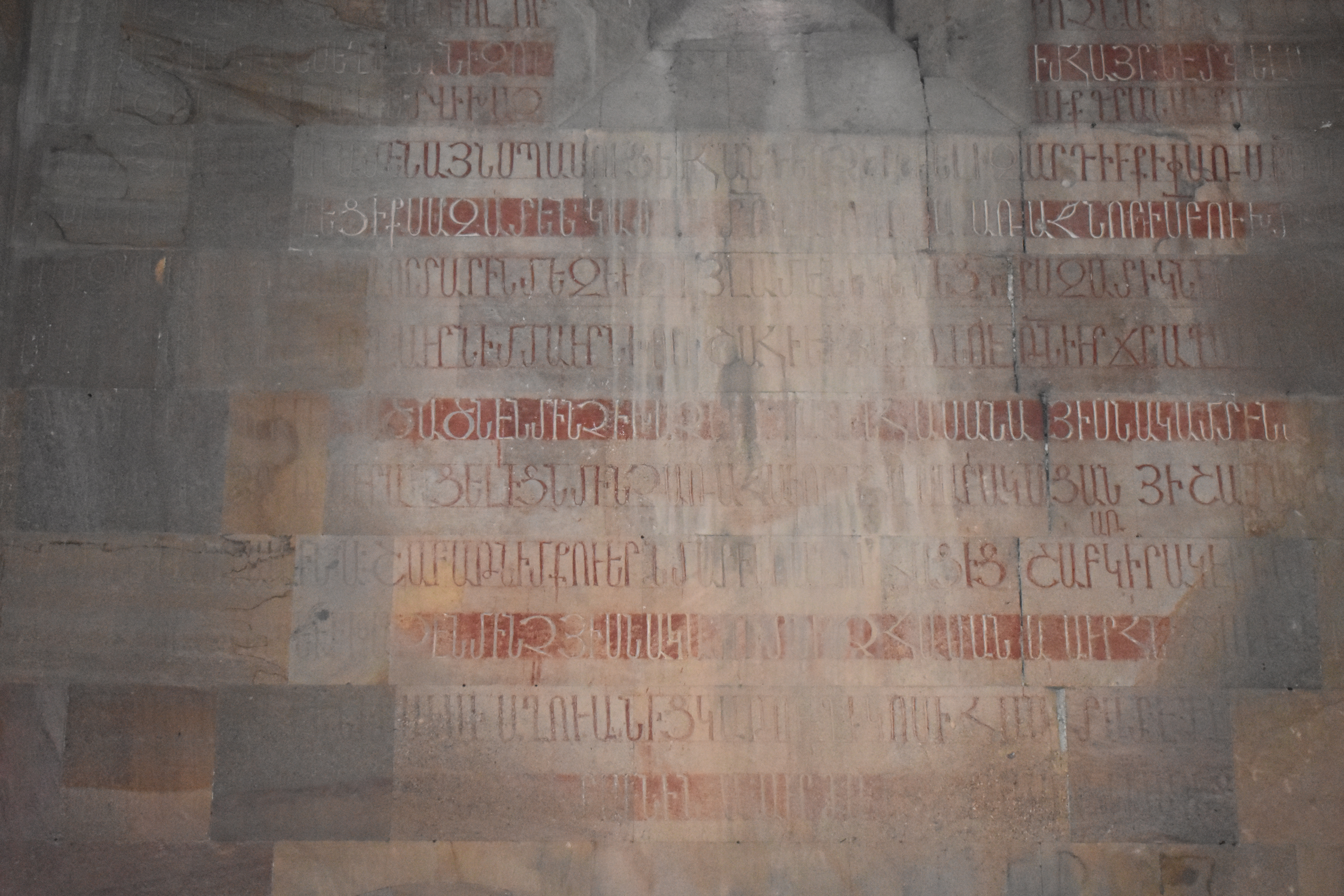
Church interior: foundation inscription

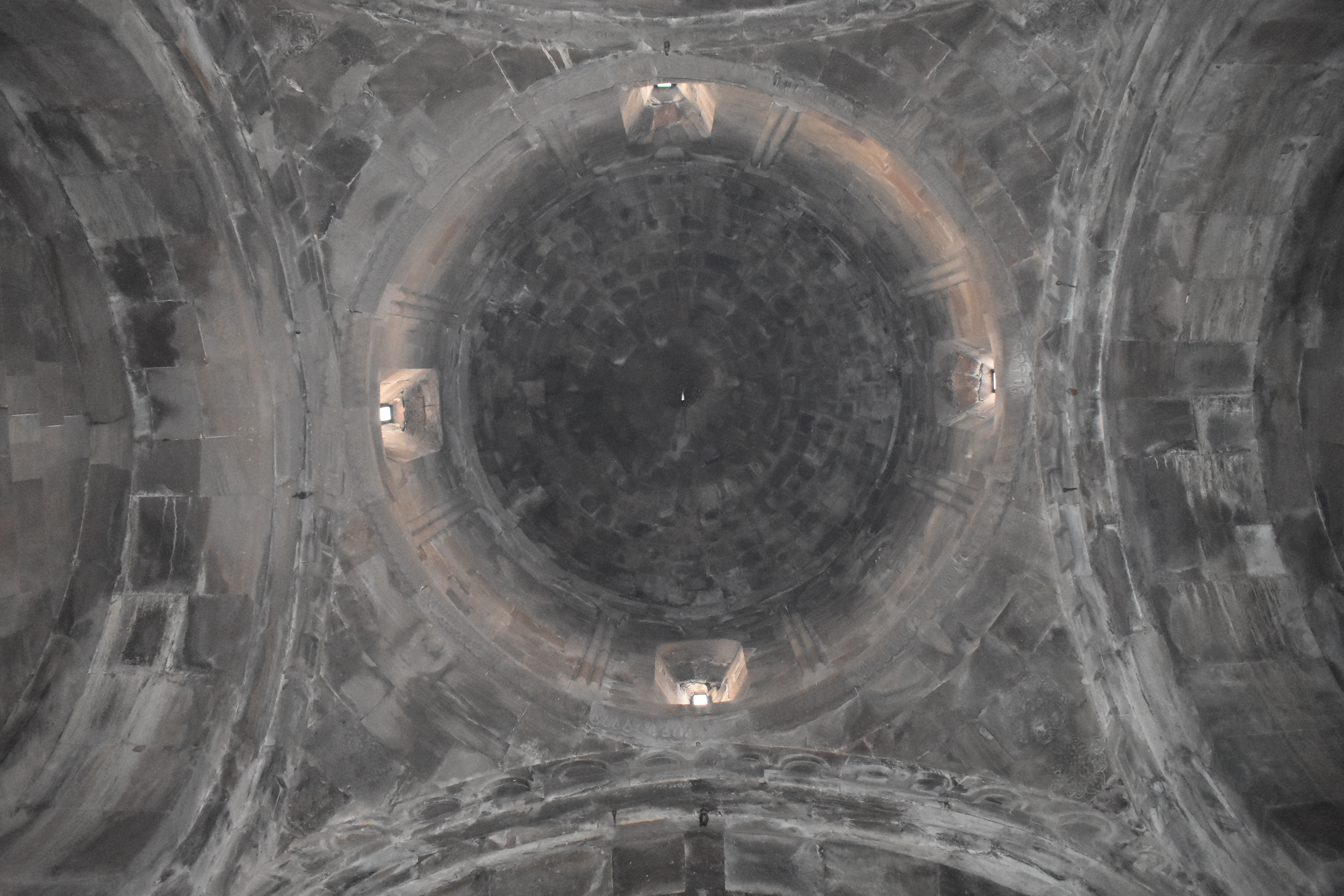
Church interior: dome over crossing

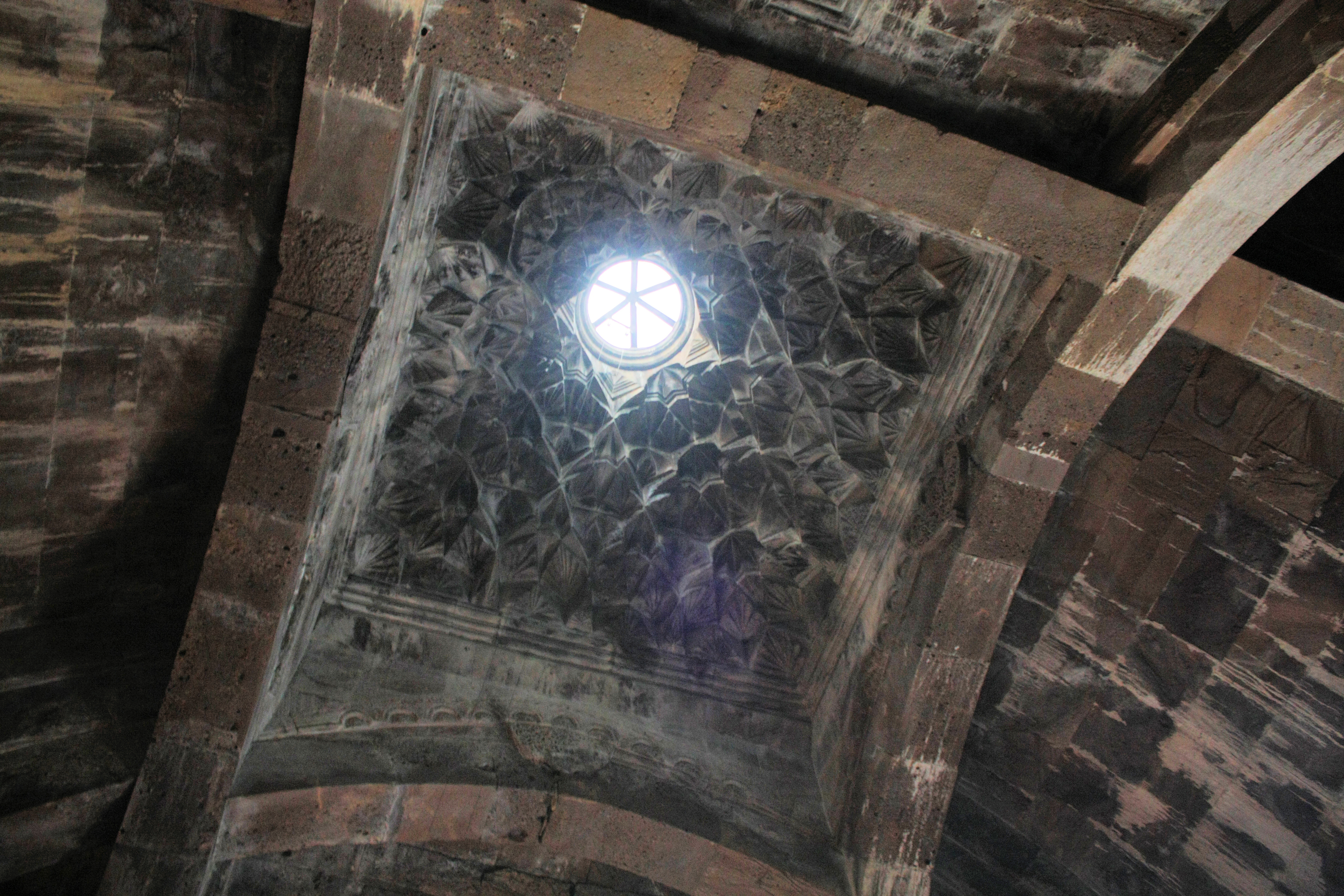
Muqarnas-type of vault in Gandzasar.

== Bibliography ==
- Corley, Felix (1998). "The Armenian Church under the Soviet and independent regimes, part 3: The leadership of Vazgen". Religion, State and Society. 26 (3–4): 291–355. doi:10.1080/09637499808431832. S2CID 145420788.
- Melik-Shahnazaryan, Levon (1997). "Армянская Культура - Объект Агрессии Азербайджана [Armenian Culture: An Object of Aggression by Azerbaijan]". Военные преступления Азербайджана против мирного населения НКР [Azerbaijani War Crimes Against the Peaceful Population of NKR]. Yerevan: Nairi.
- Ulubabyan, Bagrat; Yakobson, Anatoly L. [in Russian] (1976). "Գանձասար [Gandzasar]". Soviet Armenian Encyclopedia Volume II (in Armenian). pp. 686–687.
- Mkrtchyan, Shahen [in Armenian] (1989). "Гандзасар [Gandzasar]". Историко-архитектурные памятники Нагорного Карабаха [Historical and architectural monuments of Nagorno-Karabakh] (2nd ed.). Yerevan: Parberakan. pp. 14–19.
- Ter-Danielian, M. (1948). "Գանձասար [Gandzasar]". Etchmiadzin (in Armenian). 5 (3–4). Mother See of Holy Etchmiadzin: 62–67.
- Hewsen, Robert H. (2001). Armenia: A Historical Atlas. University of Chicago Press. ISBN 0-226-33228-4.
