= Snare of Glory =

18th-century Armenian political text

A Book Called Snare of Glory
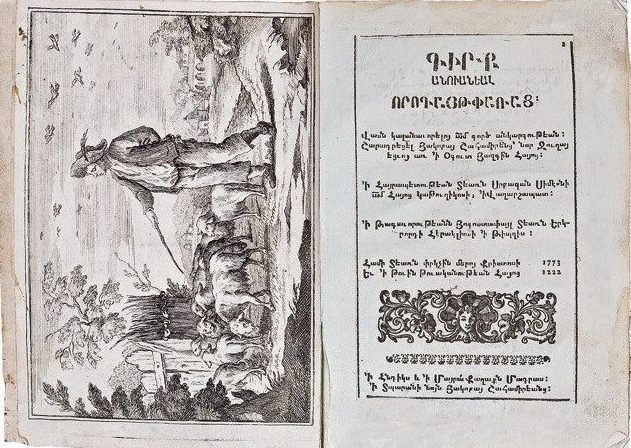
- Title page and illustration of Snare of Glory
- Author: Shahamir Shahamirian
- Language: Armenian
- Publication date: 1787–89 (listed as 1773 on the title page)
- Publication place: India
- Media type: Print

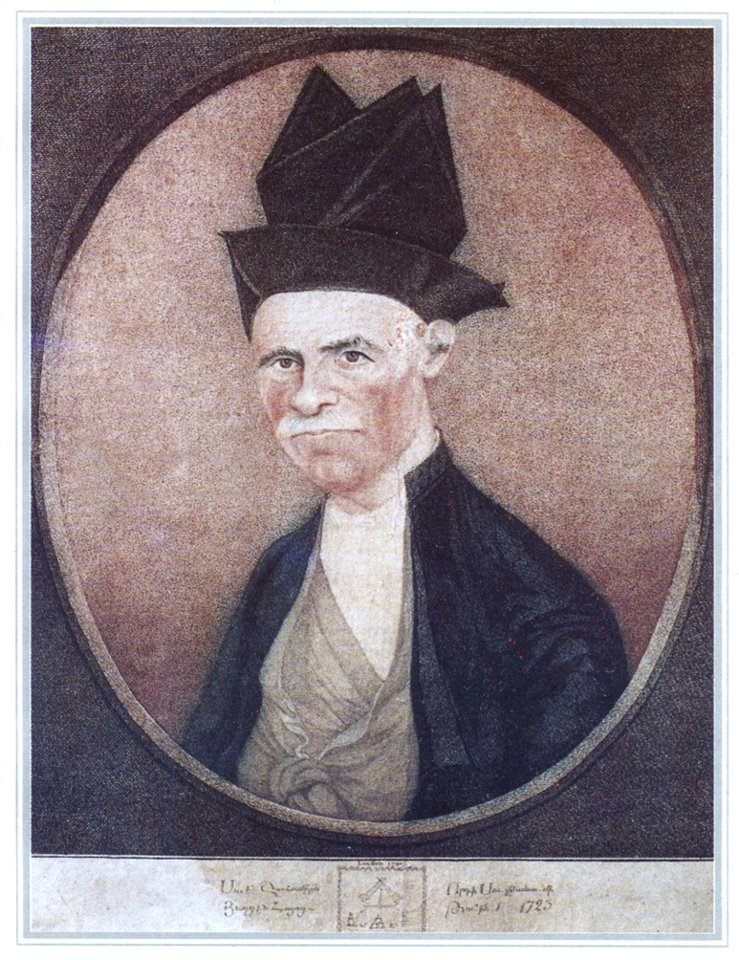
Portrait of Shahamir Shahamirian, the main author of the work

A Book Called Snare of Glory (Note: Hereafter simply Snare of Glory. Subtitle: To Prevent All Disorderly Deeds (Armenian: Վասն կալանաւորելոյ ամենայն գործ անկարգութեան, romanized: Vasn kalanavoreloy amenayn gorts ankargut’ean)) (Armenian: Գիրք անուանեալ որոգայթ փառաց, romanized: Girk’ anvaneal vorogayt’ p’ar’ats’, sometimes shortened to Vorogayt Parats) is an Armenian political and legal treatise written by the Armenian merchant and intellectual Shahamir Shahamirian and his son Hakob Shahamirian. It was published between 1787 and 1789 (although its title page gives the date as 1773). It contains a proposed constitution for a future independent Armenian state along parliamentary and republican lines. It was published at the author's printing press in Madras (modern-day Chennai, India). It is regarded as a landmark in Armenian intellectual and literary history. It is one of the earliest and most significant expressions of the ideals of the Enlightenment in the Armenian context. It has also been called the first constitution in Asia.

Snare of Glory consists of two main parts: a long introduction with historical and theoretical analysis, probably authored in part by Shahamirian's son Hakob (to whom the entire book is erroneously attributed on the title page), and the actual text of the draft constitution. The second, main part of the book is a draft constitution consisting of 521 articles, addressing issues ranging from the rights of citizens, the system of government, social and economic structure, education system and military of the future Armenian state. It declared all citizens of the future state to be born free and equal before the law, with freedom of speech, religion and economic activity. The political and economic system, however, was to be one that would favor Armenians of the Gregorian confession.

== Background ==
Shahamir Shahamirian (1723–1797) was an Armenian from New Julfa in Iran who moved to India in the 1740s and became the wealthiest Armenian merchant in Madras after inheriting his uncle's fortune. At the time, Madras was home to a small but prosperous and influential community of about 200–240 Armenian merchants, mostly of New Julfan origin. In the second half of the eighteenth century, the fortunes of the Armenian merchants of India were declining because of the expansion of the British East India Company and its state-chartered monopoly in trade. This is thought to have influenced the social, political and cultural views of Indo-Armenians like Shahamir Shahamirian. Faced with shrinking commercial prospects in India, they became more concerned with Armenian education and national consciousness and with the state of their ancestral homeland, Armenia, then divided between the Ottoman Empire and Iran. Shahamir Shahamirian was one of the most prominent figures of this Armenian revival in Madras. Although Shahamirian was not well educated, he took a keen interest in literary and political matters and hired English and Armenian tutors. He also hired Movses Baghramian, a learned Armenian from Karabagh, to educate his sons Hakob and Yeghiazar. Shahamirian's ideas were influenced by Baghramian, as well as Joseph Emin, an Indo-Armenian who had traveled to Europe and spent years trying to organize a rebellion to free Armenia from Muslim rule.

The Shahamirians, Baghramian and their collaborators, known collectively as the Madras group, sought to rally Armenians in Armenia and the diaspora to educate themselves about their history and struggle against foreign rule. They advocated for the establishment of an independent Armenian state (Note: The Madras group also considered a joint Georgian-Armenian state under the rule of Heraclius II as a possibility.) and the return of Armenians from the diaspora to their homeland. They were influenced by contemporary Enlightenment ideas such as constitutionalism, natural law, popular sovereignty and representative government. They expressed their ideas in a series of works published using the Armenian printing press founded in Madras by the Shahamirians in 1770 or 1771. The first of these works was Nor tetrak vor kochi hordorak ("New Booklet Called Exhortation") by Movses Baghramian, which analyzes Armenian history to determine the reasons for the loss of Armenian statehood and calls on Armenians to prepare to struggle for their liberty. It advocates for the establishment of an Armenian state with a "firm constitution" and a "national parliament." Two of the works published by the Madras press were authored by Shahamir Shahamirian: Tetrak vor kochi nshavak ("Booklet of Aim," 1783), which provided a communal constitution for the Armenians of Madras, and Snare of Glory, which provided a constitution for a future independent Armenian republic.

The final publication of Snare of Glory appears to have been delayed by the censuring of the activities of Shahamirian's group by Catholicos Simeon of Yerevan (head of the Armenian Church 1763–1780). In 1776, Catholicos Simeon reacted extremely negatively to the group's first book, Nor tetrak vor kochi hordorak, for its radical ideas. The Madras group had sent Simeon the work expecting to gain his support. Instead, the Catholicos excommunicated the book's author, Movses Baghramian, and demanded that Shahamirian close down the printing press and destroy all copies of Nor tetrak vor kochi hordorak. Shahamirian also sent the Catholicos a manuscript copy of the introductory section Snare of Glory for inspection. It was only after Simeon's death in 1780 that the Madras press was able to resume its activities.

After 1783, Shahamirian was in periodic contact with King Heraclius II of Georgia, whom he saw as a potential ally for the realization of the Madras group's political goals. Heraclius wrote to Shahamirian asking him to write a work to help improve the government of his realm. In a letter dated to 15 October 1787, Shahamirian wrote to Heraclius saying that he was unable to fulfill his request, but instead sent him a manuscript copy of the second, draft constitution part of Snare of Glory, which had not yet been printed at that point. Shahamirian also sent manuscript copies of the work prior to its publication to Catholicos Ghukas Karnetsi and Hovsep Arghutian, archbishop of the Armenians of Russia. Snare of Glory was finally printed sometime between late 1787 and 1789.

=== Authorship ===
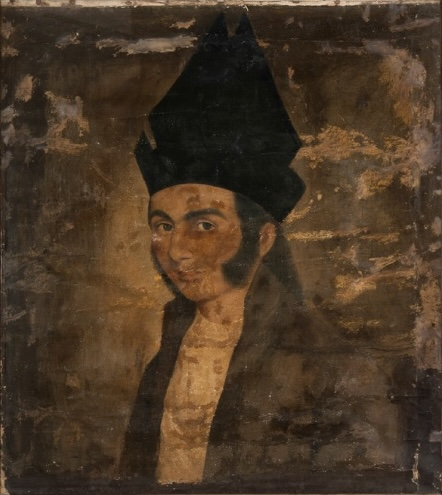
Portrait of Hakob Shahamirian, likely author of the introductory section of Snare of Glory. The entire work is erroneously attributed to him on the title page.

The authorship and date of publication of Snare of Glory have been debated by scholars. The title page lists 1773 as the date of publication and Hakob Shahamirian (d. 1774), son of Shahamir, as its author. The 1773 dating was accepted by most scholars as fact until the 1920s, when historian Tadevos Avdalbegyan demonstrated that this is impossible, as the text contains references to events that took place after 1773, such as the American War of Independence and the death of Iranian ruler Karim Khan Zand. Additionally, on the basis of Shahamir Shahamirian's letters to the Georgian king Heraclius, Avdalbegyan argued that Snare of Glory was published in 1787 or 1788 and was authored by Shahamir Shahamirian himself. However, most of the introductory section of the book was probably written in 1773 by Hakob Shahamirian, while the main section containing the details of the constitution was added later by his father. Shahamirian attributed the entire book to Hakob in honor of his late son. Historians Abgar Hovhannisyan and Poghos Khachatryan suggest that Movses Baghramian and Joseph Emin also contributed to the composition of Snare of Glory. Thus, the final version of the work was written over the course of more than a decade, with interruptions, and involved up to four authors. Scholar Satenig Batwagan Toufanian concludes that this partly explains why the work "often lacks order and sometimes even coherence."

== Contents ==
Snare of Glory consists of two main parts: a historical-theoretical introduction, and the text of the draft constitution of the future Armenian state. In the preface, the author explains the meaning of the title: the eponymous "snare of glory" is the system of laws laid out in the work that will "trap" pride or, in other words, constrain the ambition to be above the law or exploit others. The lengthy introduction identifies "despotic government" as the main cause of the Armenian people's suffering. It prescribes a state with a constitution, the rule of law, and representative government based on the principle of popular sovereignty as the solution.

The second, main part of the book is a draft constitution consisting of 521 articles, addressing issues ranging from the rights of citizens, the system of government, social and economic structure, education system and military of the future Armenian state. It declares all citizens of the future state to be born free and equal before the law, with freedom of speech, religion and economic activity. The political and economic system, however, was to be one that would favor Armenians of the Gregorian confession. Only they were to be eligible to hold office and own property, while people of other confessions or faiths would only be allowed to rent land. Apostasy by Gregorian Armenians was to be punishable by death. There would be no limitations on the right to be elected besides moral qualities. Deputies were to be elected for 3 years. The governing bodies were to be elected from among the deputies. Supreme and legislative power would be exercised by the parliament or senate, called the Hayots tun ("House of the Armenians"). A council of ministers consisting of 12 ministers and a president (called the nakharar) would exercise executive power. The parliament was to have its own presidency made up of 14 members. The president would also fulfil the role of foreign minister and commander-in-chief of the armed forces. The parliament was to supervise the activities of the council of ministers and have the right impeach the government.

There was also another special method for electing the president mentioned in the draft. A member of one of the old Armenian royal houses could be elected president for life, if he upheld the laws promulgated by the parliament. This exception was included to interest King Heraclius II of Georgia, whom the Madras group saw as a potential ally for the liberation of Armenia. Heraclius was a member of the Bagrationi dynasty, related to the Bagratunis that once reigned as kings of Armenia.

The draft constitution describes the structure, organization and powers of the other government organs and the court system. A supreme court would be established with elected members, as well as permanent local courts and juries for criminal cases. Many articles are devoted to issues of education, economic development, family relations and other issues. There was to be separation of church and state and schools would be separate from the church. Education would be compulsory for all citizens, regardless of gender. The state was to provide education and healthcare for the needy and orphans. The republic would be protected by a 90,000-strong standing army. Conscription would be carried out by lots: 5 men out of every 100 would serve for 7 years.

== Sources and influences ==
Scholars agree that the author(s) of Snare of Glory were influenced by the ideas of the European Enlightenment, but the means and extent to which they interacted with Enlightenment-era texts is somewhat unclear. Interaction with the British in Madras and the English-language press there was probably the main way that Shahamirian and his collaborators encountered these ideas. Boghos Levon Zekiyan and Vahé Oshagan write that the influence of the ideas of John Locke and Montesquieu, such as the concept of the trias politica, is especially apparent in Snare of Glory. Oshagan suggests that the constitution was an elaboration of the existing communal organization of the Armenians of Madras, supplemented with elements of the "British model in Madras," although Satenig Batwagan Toufanian writes that there is insufficient evidence to support this claim. Batwagan Toufanian also notes that few similarities are discernible with the "Astrakhan Code," a communal lawbook of the Armenians of Astrakhan written between 1750 and 1765, thought to be a codification of the rules of communal organization of the Armenians of New Julfa, Shahamir Shahamirian's birthplace.

The Bible is by far the most quoted source in Snare of Glory, although the text does not reveal a very thorough knowledge of scripture. Batwagan Toufanian writes that the Bible and Christian philosophy constitute the most familiar, but not necessarily the sole, conceptual framework for Shahamirian. The history of Armenia of Movses Khorenatsi is mentioned explicitly in the text and drawn from extensively, as well as the geography Ashkharhatsuyts formerly attributed to Khorenatsi but now attributed to Anania Shirakatsi. References to the history of the Roman republic and empire are inexactly attributed in the text to "accounts of the Roman geographers." Batwagan Toufanian writes that Shahamirian probably learned about Roman history from some secondary sources, but it cannot be determined from which ones. The use of Roman history as an instructive example on government and politics reflects a certain familiarity with contemporary European intellectual themes.

== Language ==
Snare of Glory is written in Classical Armenian heavily mixed with vernacular and foreign words and containing many grammatical and orthographical errors. Historian Tadevos Avdalbegyan describes the language of Snare of Glory as "illiterate, macaronic [...] Classical Armenian only in appearance."

== Impact and legacy ==
Because of its small print run (slightly more than 100 copies), the immediate impact of Snare of Glory and other works published by the Shahamirian press was small. The Shahamirians were generally forgotten by the time their progressive ideas became more widespread among Armenians by the second half of the nineteenth century. Snare of Glory was reprinted for the first time in Tiflis in 1913. Interest in the Snare of Glory and the other works of the Shahamirian press increased after the Sovietization of Armenia in 1920. Soviet Armenian authors praised Shahamirian as the founder of the Armenian "bourgeois democratic movement," with Snare of Glory as the manifesto of this movement. After the independence of Armenia in 1991, interest in Snare of Glory rose again in connection with the question of a new constitution and state institutions for independent Armenia. Malik Telunts published an in-depth study of Snare of Glory in 1995, the year that the Constitution of Armenia was adopted. A partial reprint of Snare of Glory was published in 1999, and a full translation into modern Eastern Armenian was published by Poghos Khachatryan in 2002. Partial translations into Russian were made in the early 2000s. In 2018, Satenig Batwagan Toufanian published a detailed study of Snare of Glory with a full translation of the work into French.

Snare of Glory is sometimes erroneously called the first constitution in the world. (Note: For example, the Fundamental Constitutions of Carolina were written and adopted earlier, in 1669.) It is, however, the first constitution in Asia. The authors Shahamir and Hakob Shahamirian are regarded as the first to import the concept of constitution into Armenian political thought; their portraits are displayed on the walls of the library of the Constitutional Court of Armenia. Gagik Harutyunyan, the former chairman of the Constitutional Court of Armenia, once referred to Snare of Glory as "essentially our first Constitution," which is "almost in conformance with today’s requirements for the protection of individual rights and freedoms".
