= Hovsep Arghutian (bishop) =

18th-century Armenian archbishop

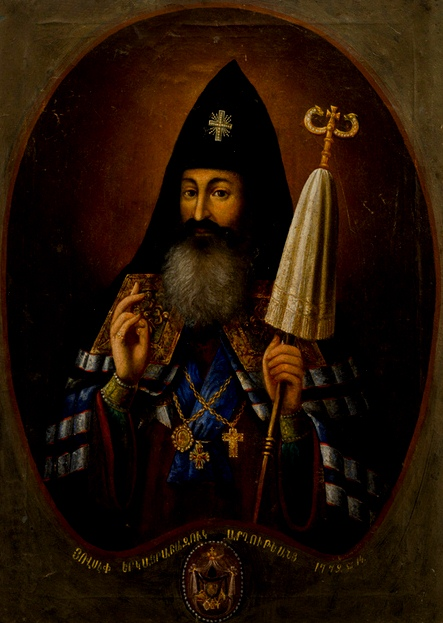
Portrait of Archbishop Hovsep Arghutian

Hovsep Arghutian (Note: Also Arghutiants (Armenian: Արղութեանց).) (Armenian: Յովսէփ Արղութեան; (Note: Reformed spelling: Հովսեփ Արղության.) 23 May 1743 – 9 March 1801), known in Russian as Iosif Argutinsky-Dolgorukov (Russian: Иосиф Аргутинский-Долгоруков), was an eighteenth-century Armenian archbishop who served as the religious leader of Armenians in the Russian Empire. He played a key role in the establishment of Armenian settlements in Russia, most notably that of Nakhichevan-on-Don. He co-founded the first Armenian press in Russia and directed its activities. He had a close personal relationship with Catherine the Great and Grigory Potemkin and advised them on Russia's policies in the Caucasus region. Arghutian was a committed Russophile and sought Russian support for the creation of an Armenian state. He personally participated in the Russian campaign against Persia in 1796. He was elected Catholicos of All Armenians (leader of the Armenian Church) in 1800, but died on his way to Etchmiadzin in 1801 and was never consecrated.

== Early life and consecration ==
Hovsep Arghutian was born on 23 May 1743 in Sanahin in the region of Lori. He was a member of the Argutinsky-Dolgorukov noble family, which claimed descent from the medieval Georgian-Armenian Zakarid house. His father, Shiosh-Bek, held a position in the Georgian court; his mother's name was Ketevan. He had three brothers, Movses, Parsadan and Bezhan, and one sister, Mariam. He received his education at Sanahin Monastery and then at the seminary at Etchmiadzin, where he studied under Catholicos Simeon of Yerevan (r. 1763–1780). He was consecrated a bishop by Catholicos Simeon in 1769 and made primate of the Russian-Armenian diocese in 1773.

== Archbishop in Russia ==
Arghutian's appointment came at a time of increased Russian-Armenian interaction. Catherine the Great's victories over the Ottomans and interest in the South Caucasus again raised Armenian hopes of gaining autonomy through Russian assistance. Catholicos Simeon and his successor Ghukas (r. 1780–1799) followed a cautious policy and remained loyal to Iranian rule. Arghutian, on the other hand, was a strong supporter of Russian expansion into the South Caucasus and believed that Armenians should adopt a pro-Russian orientation. He criticized the leaders of the Armenian Church for their cautious attitude towards Russia. Simeon and Ghukas both distanced themselves from Arghutian's pro-Russian activities to avoid provoking their Iranian overlords. Thus, Arghutian was able to act independently from the Catholicos in Etchmiadzin. Historian George Bournoutian describes Arghutian as "a major participant in swaying the Armenians toward a Russian orientation."

In the aftermath of the Russo-Turkish War of 1768–1774, Catherine the Great enlisted Arghutian's help to oversee the migration of around 12,600 Crimean Armenians to Russia in 1778. In 1780, Arghutian helped found the town of Nakhichevan-on-Don (now part of Rostov-on-Don) and five nearby villages (Chaltyr, Bolshaya Sala, Sultan Sala, Topti, and Novita) to house the Armenian migrants. From 1780, Arghutian was also the spiritual leader of the Armenians of Crimea. Arghutian cultivated close relationships with the Russian imperial family and aristocracy and hoped to use these relationships to bring about the liberation of Armenia. He was close to Catherine the Great and was a personal friend of her powerful favorite Grigory Potemkin and General Alexander Suvorov. He advised Catherine and Potemkin on Russia's policy in the South Caucasus. Arghutian also corresponded with representatives of the Armenian settlements in Russia, Catholicos Ghukas, the Armenian communities of Georgia and India, various Russian statesmen, the Georgian kings Heraclius II and George XII, the meliks of Karabakh and many other figures. Copies of many of his letters have been preserved, which serve as important sources for the study of the period.

In 1780, Arghutian and the influential Russian-Armenian Ivan Lazarev met with Potemkin to discuss Russia's policies towards the Caucasus and Armenia. The signing of the Treaty of Georgievsk in 1783, by which the Kingdom of Kartli-Kakheti became a protectorate of Russia, encouraged Arghutian to increase his diplomatic efforts. The same year, Arghutian presented a proposal for a Russian-Armenian alliance to the Russian court which envisioned the creation of an Armenian state under Russian suzerainty. According to the proposal, the future Armenian kingdom would be protected by Russian troops paid for by the Armenians. Armenia would have a trade port on the Caspian Sea, and would be represented by an envoy in Saint Petersburg. The proposal contained descriptions of an Armenian flag and coat of arms. Arghutian and Lazarev also presented a more radical alliance proposal drafted by the Indo-Armenian merchant Shahamir Shahamirian, although neither proposal appears to have resulted in anything.

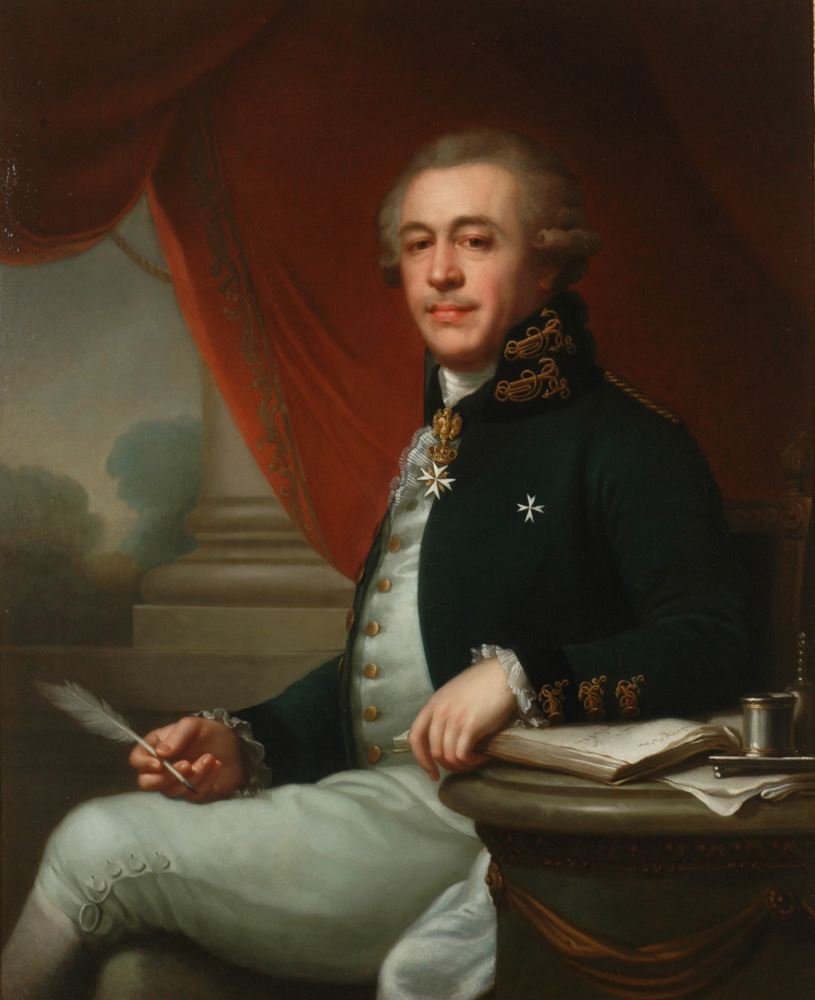
Arghutian's collaborator Ivan Lazarev

Arghutian and Lazarev were disappointed after the Russo-Turkish War of 1787–1792 ended without the annexation of Armenia. They continued to appeal to Catherine to establish an Armenian kingdom, but the empress suggested nothing more than the immigration of Armenians to Russian and Georgian territory. In 1792, at Potemkin and Arghutian's initiative, the settlement of Grigoriopol (named after Saint Gregory the Illuminator) was founded and populated with Armenians from Moldavia and Bessarabia who had suffered during the latest Russo-Turkish war.

At the invitation of Platon Zubov, Arghutian personally participated in the Russian expedition against Persia in 1796 and called on Armenians to aid the Russian army. He greatly assisted the campaign with his knowledge of the region and its languages. However, the expedition was cut short because of Catherine the Great's death in November 1796. Arghutian attempted to convince the new tsar Paul I, who was uninterested in the South Caucasus, to reconsider his policy. In 1799, Paul I presented Arghutian with a decree declaring that the Armenians were under the Tsar's protection. Arghutian participated in the composition of the emperor's 1799 proclamation which established uniform privileges for the Armenian communities of Grigoriopol, Crimea, Astrakhan, Kizlyar, and Mozdok. According to historian Pavel Chobanyan, Arghutian actively opposed Catholic influence upon Armenians while fostering an atmosphere of mutual tolerance between the Armenian and Russian churches.

== Printing activities ==
Arghutian collaborated with the wealthy Indo-Armenian merchant Grigor Khaldarian to found the first Armenian printing house in Russia. Khaldarian moved his printing press from London to Saint Petersburg in 1781, most likely with Arghutian's help. Arghutian commissioned most, if not practically all, of the books published by Khaldarian's press. He bought the printing press from Khaldarian's widow in 1789 and moved it to Nakhichevan-on-Don and, later, to Astrakhan. Arghutian used his connections with wealthy merchants in the Armenian diaspora to gain financial support for his printing activities. Through Arghutian's efforts, more than forty books were published by the Russian-Armenian printing press. He also authored and printed several works on religious topics. The printing press remained active until Arghutian's death in 1801.

== Election as catholicos and death ==
After the death of Catholicos Ghukas in 1799, Arghutian emerged as one of the five candidates for the position. He was elected Catholicos of Etchmiadzin in 1800 with the help of significant pressure from Russia. On 28 July 1800, Paul I recognized Arghutian as the Catholicos of All Armenians. However, Arghutian fell ill and died in Tiflis (Tbilisi) on 9 March 1801 while traveling to Etchmiadzin to take up his position and was never consecrated as catholicos.
