= Melik Shahnazar II =

18th-century Armenian ruler

Melik of Varanda
- Reign: 1743/1747–1792
- Predecessor: Melik Hovsep or Melik Mirzabek
- Successor: Melik Jumshud
- Native name: Մելիք-Շահնազար Բ
- Born: 1725/26 or 1731
- Died: 1792; Varanda, Karabakh
- Noble family: House of Melik-Shahnazarian
- Issue: Melik Jumshud
- Father: Melik Hussein

Melik Shahnazar II (Note: Called Melik Shahnazar III in some sources.) (Armenian: Մելիք-Շահնազար Բ; 1725/26 or 1731 – 1792) was the melik of Varanda, one of the five Melikdoms of Karabakh, in the 18th century. He is a controversial figure in Armenian history, whose actions contributed significantly to the demise of the Armenian Melikdoms of Artsakh.

== Early years ==
According to Pavel Chobanyan, Shahnazar was twelve years old in 1743, which would make his birth year 1731. Artak Maghalyan assumes that Shahnazar was born in 1725 or 1726, a year or two after the kidnapping of his mother by his father. His father was Melik Hussein of Varanda, and his mother was Zohra Khanum, the daughter of the Khan of Nakhichevan, whom Melik Hussein had captured and married. He had a half-brother, Hovsep, a half-sister, Gayane, and a full-brother, Ghahraman Bek.

== Accession to power and reign ==
According to most accounts, (Note: The 19th-century Muslim historians Mirza Adigozal Bey and Ahmad Bey Javanshir write that Shahnazar killed his uncle to usurp the throne, not his brother. The same is reported by Mirza Yusuf Nersesov. Mirza Jamal Javanshir and Abbas Qoli Bakikhanov mention Shahnazar's conflict with the other meliks and alliance with Panah Ali Khan but not his usurpation of the throne and murder of his relative.) Shahnazar killed his half-brother Melik Hovsep Shahnazarian during the disorder following Nader Shah's death in 1747 and seized control of Varanda as Melik Shahnazar II. Later, he also killed Hovsep's son Sayi Bek, who had taken refuge with his uncle Melik Allahverdi of Khachen. He sided with the chieftain of nomadic Sarijali branch of the Turkic Javanshir clan, Panah Ali, accepting his suzerainty and ceding the fortress of Shushi to him, after which Panah Ali made it the capital of the newfound Karabakh Khanate. He forced the meliks of Jraberd and Gulistan to flee and severely weakened the melik of Dizak. A truce was reached in 1760 when the meliks were allowed to remain in possession of their lands in return for recognition of Panah as Khan of Karabakh. Shahnazar further consolidated his alliance with the Khans of Karabakh by marrying his daughter Hurizad Khanum off to Panah Ali's son Ibrahim Khalil Khan. He died in 1792.

There is an alternative version of Melik Shahnazar's accession according to which he became ruler by legal means. In 1736, Shahnazar's father Melik Hussein died, and since Shahnazar was a minor, Hussein's brother Mirzabek became Melik of Varanda. In 1743, Nader Shah of Iran revoked Mirzabek's melikal rights and, through Melik Yegan's mediation, elevated the twelve-year-old Shahnazar to the throne. Nadir Shah's firman confirming Shahnazar as melik has survived and is kept at the Matenadaran in Armenia. In historian Pavel Chobanyan's view, the story of Shahnazar's murder of his brother and usurpation of the throne was invented by Muslim historians such as Mirza Jamal Javanshir and Mirza Adigozal Bey, who were seeking to affirm the hereditary rights of the khans of Karabakh and their descendants and discredit those of the Melik-Shahnazarians before the Russian authorities; later, this story was adopted and repeated by Armenian authors. Additionally, there are documents which indicate that Shahnazar's brother Hovsep was still alive when the former was already reigning and that Hovsep died after Shahnazar, thus refuting the information the Shahnazar killed his own brother.

== Legacy and memory ==
In his work Khamsayi melikut’yunner (The Five Melikdoms of Karabagh, 1888), Armenian author Raffi calls Shahnazar a "traitor and villain" for killing his relatives, usurping the melikdom of Varanda and allying himself with Panah Ali against the rest of the meliks of Karabakh. Raffi writes that Shahnazar "adopted in his private life the polygamous customs of the Persians", whereby he "greatly shocked and revolted the religious feelings of the people, and incurred the hatred of all the other Meliks". The Indo-Armenian traveler Joseph Emin, who visited Karabakh in the 18th century, reports that the wife of Mirza Khan (an ally of Shahnazar) described Shahnazar as "a true friend of Panah [Ali Khan], a learned man in the Persian language, and the establisher of the Mahomedans in our mountains [of Karabakh]: he was a son of Belzabub, nor worthy of the name of a Christian."

According to Bishop Makar Barkhudaryants, although Shahnazar regretted his actions in the last years of his life, the Armenians of Karabakh did not forgive him, slamming him in their folk stories with satire via Pele Pughi's character, which depicted the latter as the melik's disobedient jester who constantly provokes the ruler to do silly things, so that he would remain on the right path out of fear of finding himself in laughable situations.

Shahnazar restored Amaras Monastery in the late 1780s; according to some authors, he hoped to achieve forgiveness for his sins by this. His descendants, who continued to live in Shushi, took good care of Amaras Monastery, restoring it for the last time in 1858.

== Descendants ==
Shahnazar's son Melik Jumshud, together with Melik Abov of House Melik-Beglarian, helped Ibrahim Khan against Agha Mohammad Khan Qajar when he besieged Shushi in spring 1795. When Russian forces led by General Pavel Tsitsianov captured Ganja Fortress, Melik Jumshud persuaded Ibrahim Khan to accept Russian dominance without a fight in 1805. Melik Jumshud subsequently killed Ibrahim Khan with the help of lieutenant-colonel Dmitri Lisanevich when Ibrahim switched sides and invited the Persians to capture Shushi in 1806. Jumshud and Lisanevich caught and killed Ibrahim Khan while he was on his way to join Persian prince Abbas Mirza's camp at Shosh village.

Karen Shakhnazarov, a Soviet and Russian filmmaker, producer and screenwriter, is one of several living descendants of the Melik-Shahnazarian princely family. His father Georgy Shakhnazarov was a Soviet politician and political scientist who was a close aid of Mikhail Gorbachev.

== Sources ==
- Akimova, Lada (8 May 2006). "Karen Shakhnazarov: 'Ia ne ėkraniziruiu svoiu zhiznʹ'". Izvestia (in Russian). Archived from the original on 28 May 2009.
- Beknazaryants, Apres (2018) [1886]. Gaghtnikʻ Gharabaghi: patmakan hushagrutʻyun [Secrets of Karabakh: a historical memoir] (in Armenian). Stepanakert: Dizak plyus hratarakchʻutʻyun. ISBN 978-9939-1-0770-7.
- Bournoutian, George A. (1994). A History of Qarabagh: An Annotated Translation of Mirza Jamal Javanshir Qarabaghi's Tarikh-e Qarabagh. Costa Mesa: Mazda Publishers. ISBN 978-1568590110.
- Bournoutian, George A. (2004). Two Chronicles on the History of Karabagh: Mirza Jamal Javanshir's Tarikh-e Karabagh and Mirza Adigözal Beg's Karabagh-name. Costa Mesa: Mazda Publishers. ISBN 978-1-56859-179-7.
- Chobanyan, Pavel (2014). "Problema legitimnosti karabakhskikh khanov v kontekste politicheskoĭ istorii Shushi" [The question of legitimization of the Karabakh khans in the context of the political history of Shushi]. Patma-Banasirakan Handes (in Russian) (1): 164–182.
- Emin, Joseph (1918) [1792]. Apcar, Amy (ed.). Life and Adventures of Emin Joseph Emin 1726–1809, Written by Himself (Second ed.). Calcutta: Baptist Mission Press.
- Hasan-Jalaliants, Sergius [Sargis] (2013). A History of the Land of Artsakh. English translation by Kaʼren V. Ketendjian; historical introduction, editing, maps, charts and annotations by Robert H. Hewsen. Costa Mesa: Mazda Publishers. ISBN 978-1-56859-174-2.
- Hayrapetyan, Tamar (2012). Suvaryan, Yu. (ed.). Gharabaghi aṛakakhos Pěl Pughu sotsʻial-kʻaghakʻakan ergitsankʻě [The Social and Political Satire of Jester Pele Pughi from Kharabakh]. Historical-Cultural Heritage of the Armenian Highland (in Armenian). Yerevan State University Press. pp. 83–85. ISBN 978-5808416055.
- Hewsen, Robert H. (1972). "The Meliks of Eastern Armenia: A Preliminary Study". Revue des Études Arméniennes. Nouvelle série. IX: 285–329.
- Lalayan, Yervand (1897). "Varanda". Azgagrakan Handes (in Armenian). II: 4–244.
- Maghalyan, Artak (2007). Artsʻakhi melikʻutʻyunnerě ev melikʻakan tnerě XVII-XIX dd [The melikdoms and melikal houses of Artsakh in the 17th–19th centuries] (in Armenian). Yerevan: HH GAA "Gitutʻyun" hratarakchʻutʻyun. ISBN 978-5-8080-0714-7.
- Maghalyan, Artak (27 February 2024). "The Origin of the Khanate of Karabakh". Journal of the Society for Armenian Studies. 29 (1–12): 1–12. doi:10.1163/26670038-12342801. eISSN 2667-0038.
- Montgomery, Isobel (28 May 2001). "Obituary: Georgy Shakhnazarov". The Guardian. Archived from the original on 2 July 2023.
- Nersesov, Mirza Yusuf (2000). Chsmartatsʻi patmutʻyun [A Truthful History] (in Armenian and English). Translation, introduction and commentary by K. P. Kostikian. Yerevan: Zangak-97. ISBN 978-99930-2-137-7.
- Raffi (1964). Erkeri zhoghovatsu [Collected works]. Vol. 10. Yerevan: Haypethrat.
