= Simeon I of Yerevan =

Catholicos of Armenia from 1763 to 1780

- Catholicos of All Armenians
- Native name: Սիմէոն Ա Երեւանցի
- Church: Armenian Apostolic Church
- See: Mother See of Holy Etchmiadzin
- Installed: 1763
- Term ended: 1780
- Predecessor: Hakob V Shamakhetsi
- Successor: Ghukas Karnetsi

Personal details
- Born: 1710 Yerevan, Iranian Armenia, Safavid Iran
- Died: 26 June 1780 (aged 69–70) Vagharshapat, Erivan Khanate, Iran
- Buried: Saint Gayane Church

Simeon I of Yerevan (Armenian: Սիմէոն Ա Երեւանցի (Note: Reformed orthography: Սիմեոն Ա Երևանցի); 1710–1780), also known as Simeon Yerevantsi, served as the Catholicos of All Armenians between 1763 and 1780.

Before his pontificate, he served as a representative of Etchmiadzin in Constantinople, New Julfa, and Madras. After becoming catholicos in 1763, he took measures to reassert Etchmiadzin's primacy over other sees of the Armenian church. According to historian Rouben Paul Adalian, the pontificate of Simeon I of Yerevan marked the reemergence of Etchmiadzin (present-day Vagharshapat) as a "truly important center of Armenian national affairs". In 1771, he founded the first printing press in Armenia at Etchmiadzin Cathedral as a part of his efforts to extend Etchmiadzin's authority. He also acted against the spread of Catholicism among Armenians, using methods that the historian Leo called "inquisitorial". He also polemicized against Catholics in his written works.

Simeon opposed the activities of Joseph Emin and Shahamir Shahamirian, two Armenians from India who envisioned the reestablishment of an independent Armenian state. However, he was not against Armenia coming under the rule of a Christian power. For that reason, he established relations with the court of Empress Catherine the Great of Russia. He sent a letter to Catherine in 1766, and in 1768 the Empress restored Etchmiadzin's authority over the Russian diocese of the Armenian Church.

Simeon I is the author of religious, philosophical, and historical works. Notable among these is the work Jambr, which was written as a part of his efforts to increase Etchmiadzin's authority. In another one of his works, he asserts the role of the Catholicosate of Etchmiadzin "as the sole spiritual sole spiritual head or representative of the [Armenian] nation." He also added to and reformed the calendar of the Armenian church, seeking to create uniformity in church rituals and ceremonies.

== Biography ==
Simeon I was born in 1710 in Yerevan, then under Safavid Iranian rule. A genealogical chart apparently made by Simeon's nephew Yegor Khubov lists the catholicos's birth name as Khudabashkh; however, based on another contemporary source, historian Giut Aghaniants writes that his birth name was in fact Simeon or Simon, while Khudabashkh may have been a nickname. (Note: As Aghaniants notes, if it is true that the surname Khubov (Russian Хубов, Խուբեանց Khubiants with the Armenian ending) is a corruption of Gubov (Губов), itself formed when Yegor Khubov was in Russia by translating the name Proshiants (Պռօշեանց; prosh literally means 'lip', in Russian губ gub), then the surname could not have been in use during Simeon's lifetime.) According to his contemporaries and 19th-century sources, his family was of noble origin. (Note: Historians Giut Aghaniants and Maghakia Ormanian cast doubt on the claim that Simeon was related to the Proshian Armenian noble family, but they do not rule out that Simeon had noble ancestry. In his autobiography, Joseph Emin quotes Catholicos Hovhannes of Gandzasar as saying that Simeon was of "very low extraction".) He received his education at the monastic school in Etchmiadzin, where he studied with his predecessor as Catholicos, Hakob V Shamakhetsi, and eventually joined the teaching staff. As a legate of the Holy See of Etchmiadzin, he travelled to Istanbul, New Julfa and Madras, the last of which was an important center of Armenian intellectual activity at the time.

He was elected Catholicos at Etchmiadzin in 1763. At the time, due to the remoteness of Etchmiadzin, which was located in a frontier province of Iran, the Armenian Patriarchate of Constantinople had become the most important see of the Armenian Church. There was also an Armenian Patriarchate of Jerusalem and catholicosates in Sis (in Cilicia), Aghtamar (an island in Lake Van), and Gandzasar (in Karabakh), which challenged Etchmiadzin's authority. (Note: The catholicosates of Aghtamar and Sis had survived from the medieval period and had achieved effective independence from Etchmiadzin. They were sometimes considered "anti-catholicosates" because of "their effrontery towards Etchmiadzin but also because they had periodically listed towards the Church of Rome." The catholicosate of Gandzasar (also known as the catholicosate of Aghvank/Caucasian Albania) had a long history of semi-autonomy but had gained additional independence from the weakening of Etchmiadzin's authority in the 16th century and from its ties with the meliks of Karabakh in the 18th century.) Simeon took active efforts in order to increase the role of the See of Etchmiadzin and reassert its primacy over the other sees. He created a new office, that of vice-Catholicos, who would sit in Constantinople and oversee the Armenian Patriarch. In 1764, he appointed Abraham Astapattsi to Constantinople, which provoked backlash from the local Armenian amiras (wealthy Ottoman Armenian elites), who opposed Etchmiadzin's centralizing policies. As a part of his efforts to extend Etchmiadzin's influence, Simeon established a printing press in 1771, the very first on the territory of historical Armenia. Four years later he established a paper factory to meet the growing needs and costs of the printing press. He furthermore improved the monastic school, which would become a major center of theological learning in the 19th century.

Catholicos Simeon was particularly hostile towards Armenian Catholics and sought to prevent the spread of Catholicism among Armenians, frequently and harshly criticizing them in his written works. The historian Leo describes Simeon's anti-Catholic measures:

He began a campaign of persecution against Catholic priests working on the border of Georgia and elsewhere not only through the collaboration of [King] Heracles [of Georgia] but also through that of the local Muslim rulers... Wherever Armenians who had joined the Catholics were discovered, they were sent to Etchmiadzin through the local authorities. There, Simeon would punish them and would release them only after he had received their confession of sins. These inquisitorial practices constitute the darkest aspect of Simeon's tenure as Catholicos.

Simeon was opposed to the activities of Shahamir Shahamirian and Joseph Emin, two Armenians from India who envisioned the reestablishment of an independent Armenian state. Emin alleges in his autobiography that Simeon urged Heraclius II of Georgia to expel Emin from his kingdom, but in his letter to Heraclius dated 25 March 1764 Simeon only warns the king about the reckless behavior of Emin's followers towards the local Muslims and advises him to tell Emin to refrain from making further plans. According to historian Pavel Chobanyan, Heraclius used Simeon's letter as an excuse to expel Emin, whom he already mistrusted. Chobanyan states that Simeon was not opposed to Emin's goals but to his methods, which he feared would cause destructive reprisals against Armenians by the Ottoman state; he also reserved for himself the right to make plans regarding Armenians' political future. Simeon was not against Armenia coming under the rule of a Christian power. For that reason, he established relations with the court of Empress Catherine the Great of Russia. In 1766, he sent a letter addressed to Catherine and her son Paul. In 1768, Catherine restored Etchmiadzin's authority over the Russian diocese of the Armenian Church and promised that all Armenians, especially those living within the Russian Empire's borders, would enjoy her protection. Simeon authored a special prayer in Catherine's honor, which was thereafter recited in Armenian churches for about 150 years. (Note: English translations of Simeon's letter, Catherine's decree, and a letter from Catherine to Simeon are published in Bournoutian 2001, pp. 239–242.)

Simeon also reacted negatively to Shahamir Shahamirian and his collaborator Mikayel Khojajanian's founding of a printing press in Madras and their program for the creation of an Armenian state. In 1772/1773, the Madras printing press published Nor tetrak vor koch’i Hordorak (New book called Exhortation), a text which calls on Armenians to restore their independence by means of armed struggle. Shahamirian and Khojajanian expected to receive Simeon's approval for their plans and sent him two copies of Hordorak, along with an early version of Snare of Glory (Vorogayt’ P’ar’ats’, a draft constitution for a future Armenian state) and various suggestions to prepare for an Armenian revolt. When the book arrived in 1776, Simeon wrote back to Shahamirian ordering him to close down the printing press and burn all copies of the book, threatening him with excommunication. He also excommunicated Movses Baghramian, whom Simeon took to be the true author of Hordorak. (Note: Shahamirian's son Hakob is listed as the author of the work in the book, while Baghramian is called his assistant. Scholars have expressed varying views on the authorship of the work, with some accepting Baghramian's authorship and others attributing it to Shahamirian. In 2023, Aslanian referred to Shahamirian and Baghramian as co-authors of the work.) Shahamirian complied with Simeon's demands and did not publish another work until after the Catholicos's death. (Note: Eventually, Simeon lifted Baghramian's excommunication. Abgar Hovhannisyan viewed this as a result of Baghramian becoming wealthy. According to Chobanyan, it was also in response to the Madras Armenians changing their positions and complying with Simeon's demands.) According to historian Sebouh Aslanian, Simeon not only feared the destructive consequences of rebellion but also opposed the proposals for reducing Church authority in the works of the Madras press.

In 1765 and 1769, Heraclius II of Georgia invaded the Erivan (Yerevan) Khanate in response to Hoseyn Ali Khan's attempts to terminate payment of tribute. Both times, bloodshed was avoided through Simeon's mediation, and Heraclius accepted the restoration of the khanate's tributary status. Heraclius campaigned against the khan of Erivan again in 1778 and 1779, this time forcibly displacing the inhabitants of eight Armenian villages and resettling them in Georgia.

Simeon I died on 26 July 1780, on the holiday of Vardavar. He is buried in the southern side of the narthex of Saint Gayane Church. In accordance with his wishes, his former student Ghukas Karnetsi was elected his successor as Catholicos.

== Works ==
Simeon I is the author of religious, philosophical, and historical works. His historical work Jambr (Note: From the French word chambre 'chamber, room', which in the eighteenth century could also refer to a chamber used for storing archives.) was written as a part of his efforts to increase Etchmiadzin's authority. The book summarizes the history of the Armenian Church, gives the years of the reigns of the Armenian catholicoi, and describes the harm caused by anti-catholicosates and patriarchates, among other topics. The book also lists the dioceses of the Armenian Church, identifying their borders, settlements, the means of collecting tithes, and stating which dioceses have their own primates and which pay taxes tithes directly to Etchmiadzin. He enumerates the rights and privileges of the Catholicos, and outlines the limited rights of the catholicoi of Gandzasar (also known as the catholicos of Aghvank/Caucasian Albania, in Karabakh), Aghtamar, and Cilicia. In Chapters 20–24, he cites the decrees granted to the Armenian Church by Turkish and Iranian rulers. The final chapter gives an account of the 21 monasteries located in the Erivan Khanate (where Etchmiadzin was located).

Simeon's theological work Girk’ vor koch’i Partavchar (A book called fulfillment of a pledge, 1779) asserts the role of the Catholicosate of Etchmiadzin "as the sole spiritual head or representative of the [Armenian] nation." Simeon's conception of the Catholicos's authority has been characterized as one of "divine right"; according to Simeon, the catholicoi of Etchmiadzin inherited the right to represent the nation from Gregory the Illuminator, who converted Armenia to Christianity in the 4th century. He discusses the state of dispersion of the Armenian people, presenting it as a sign of their being "chosen" by God; he states that this dispersion prepared the way for the "Promised Land," by which he meant both the land of Armenia and the kingdom of God, which could be achieved only through Providence. In its conclusion, he polemicizes against Catholic Armenians.

Simeon's other works include philosophical treatises, all in manuscript form: Hamar’ot lutsmunk’ Porp’iwri (Brief explications of Porphyry), Meknut’iwn Prokghi (Interpretation of Proclus), Lutsmunk’ artak’in greants’n (Explications of foreign texts). He also wrote sermons, taghs (a genre of Armenian song) and prayers in which he laments the state of the Armenian people (Girk’ aghot’its’, vor koch’i Zbosaran hogevor, 1772). He added to and reformed the calendar of the Armenian church (published in two volumes in 1774), seeking to create uniformity in church rituals and ceremonies. It entered use in 1777.

== Sources ==
- Adalian, Rouben Paul (2010). Historical Dictionary of Armenia (2nd ed.). Scarecrow Press. ISBN 978-0810874503.
- Aghaneantsʻ, Giwt (1894). "Simēon katʻoghikosi kensagrutʻiwně" [Biography of Catholicos Simeon]. Diwan Hayotsʻ Patmutʻean [Archive of Armenian history] (in Armenian). Vol. 3. Tiflis: Tparan M. Sharadzē.
- Aslanian, Sebouh (2004). "Dispersion History and the Polycentric Nation։ The Role of Simeon Yerevantsi's Girk or Koči partavčar in the 18th Century Nation Revival". Bazmavēp. 39. OCLC 79389306.
- Aslanian, Sebouh David (2023). Early Modernity and Mobility: Port Cities and Printers Across the Armenian Diaspora, 1512–1800. Yale University Press. ISBN 978-0-300-24753-4.
- Bournoutian, George (1982). Eastern Armenia in the Last Decades of Persian Rule, 1807–1828. Undena Publications. ISBN 978-0890031230.
- Bournoutian, George A. (2001). Armenians and Russia (1626-1796): A Documentary Record. Costa Mesa, CA: Mazda Publishers. ISBN 1-56859-132-2.
- Chobanyan, Pavel (2002). "Simeon A Erevantsʻi" Սիմեոն Ա Երևանցի. In Ayvazyan, Hovhannes (ed.). Kʻristonya Hayastan hanragitaran Քրիստոնյա Հայաստան հանրագիտարան [Christian Armenia encyclopedia] (PDF) (in Armenian). Yerevan: Haykakan Hanragitaran hratarakchʻutʻyun. pp. 904–905.
- Chobanyan, Pavel (2006). Hay-ṛus-vratsʻakan haraberutʻyunnerě ZhĚ. dari erkrord kesin [Armenian-Russian-Georgian Relations on the Second Half of the Eighteenth Century] (in Armenian). Etchmiadzin: Mayr Atoṛ S. Ējmiatsni hratarakchʻutʻyun. ISBN 99930-75-42-6.
- Emin, Emin Joseph (1918). Apcar, Amy (ed.). Life and Adventures of Emin Joseph Emin, 1726–1809. Calcutta: Baptist Mission Press.
- Floor, Willem; Herzig, Edmund (2012). Iran and the World in the Safavid Age. I.B. Tauris. ISBN 978-1850439301.
- Hacikyan, Agop Jack; et al. (2005). The Heritage of Armenian Literature. Vol. 2. Detroit: Wayne State University Press. ISBN 0-8143-2815-6. OCLC 42477084.
- Hakobyan, T. (1971). Erevani patmutʻyuně (1500—1800 tʻtʻ.) [History of Yerevan (1500–1800)] (in Armenian). Yerevan: Erevani hamalsarani hratarakchʻutʻyun. OCLC 582481141.
- Khachikyan, L. S.; et al., eds. (1972). Hay zhoghovrdi patmutʻyun [History of the Armenian People] (in Armenian). Vol. 4. Yerevan: Armenian SSR Academy of Sciences.

| Preceded by Hakob V Shamakhetsi | Catholicos of the Holy See of St. Echmiadzin and All Armenians; 1763–1780 | Succeeded by Ghukas I Karnetsi |
