= Atabekians =

The Atabekians are an Armenian Princely (Meliqly) house of Lords of the Jraberd principality (Meliqdom) in Artsakh, which ruled in the 19th century. The most renowned representative of the family was Prince Hovhannes (Vani) Atabekian, Prince of Jraberd, who took an active part in the 1804–1813 Russo-Persian War.

The Atabekians are descendants of Prince Ivane-Atabek I Hasan-Jalalian, son of Prince Hasan-Jalalian, the Lord of Khachen. His offspring, Prince Atabek III, settled in the north-eastern part of the paternal domain, along the banks of the Tartar and Kusapat rivers and there created a new dynasty. The Atabekians consider themselves to be a dynastic branch of the House of Hasan-Jalalian, and through them trace their ancestry to the noble houses of the Vakhtangian, Aranshahik, Syuni, and the Haykazuni. DNA studies in 2009 also revealed kinship between the Atabekians and princes Argutian of Lori, Meliq-Yeganians of Dizak and Meliq-Dadians of Goris; all mentioned families belong to R1b1b2a haplogroup.

== Princes of the House of Atabekian ==
- Atabek I (mentioned in 1411, the fifth son of Prince Jalal III the Great Hasan-Jalalian)
- Aytin (mentioned in 1495)
- Sargis I

Unknown lords

- Atabek II Jraberdci (1678)
- Hovhannes-Vani I and Ghuli

The branch of Prince Vani I moved to Russia, and Ghuli became the Houselord.

- Sargis II
- Harutyun (Tuni) (end of the 18th century)
- Hovhannes (Meliq Vani) II of Jraberd (1766 – 7 March 1854)
- Hovsep-bek (1815–1861)

The family tree splits between the Armenian provinces of Jraberd and Tavush.

== Notable Atabekians ==
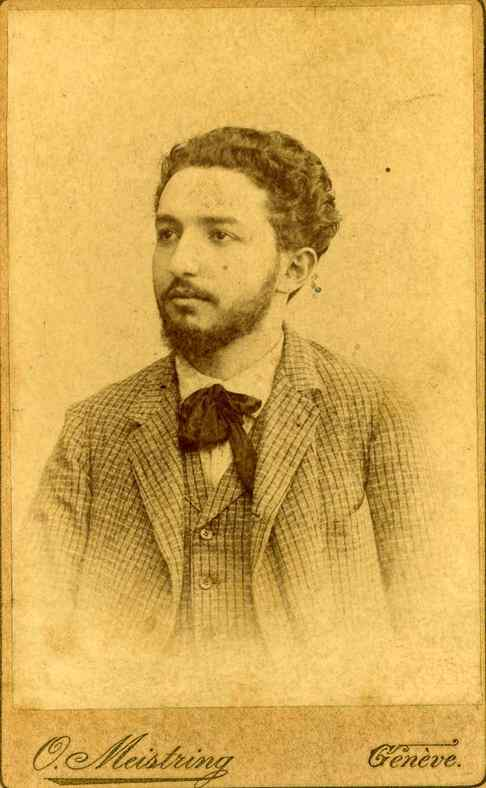
Alexander Atabekian

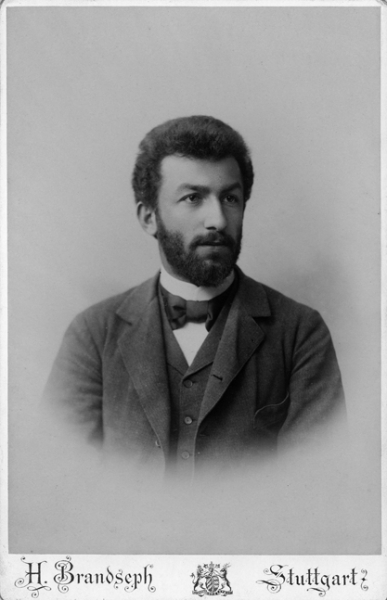
Hovsep Atabekian

- Hovhannes Atabekian, Lord of Jraberd (1766–1854)
- Mkrtich Atabekyan, public speaker (1843–1918)
- Andrey Atabekov, military general (1854–1918)
- Alexander Atabekian, physician and anarchist publisher (1868–1940)
- Hovsep Atabekian, member of the Russian Duma (1870–1916)
- Levon Atabekian, physician, activist and poet (1875–1918)
- Garegin Atabekyan, doctor (1870s–1930s)
- Tigran Atabekian, geographer (1888–1959)
- Margarit Atabekian, literary critic and translator (1917–1996)
- Mikael Atabekyan, minister of education of Armenia (1918–1920)
- Hovsep Atabekov, academic (1934–2021)
- Sergei Atabekian, literary critic (1937–2000)
- Anzhela Atabekyan, musician and art historian (b. 1938)
- Vahagn Atabekian, poet (b. 1949)
- Armen Atabekian, surgeon (b. 1951)
- Nerses Atabekian, poet and translator (b. 1960)
- Vardan Atabekian, member of the Armenian parliament (b. 1981)

== Modern day ==
The Princely House of Atabekians is one of the well-organized and active clans of Armenian nobility. The Atabekians regularly organise clan gatherings (tohmahavaq); the latest ones were held on 8 October 1983 in Meliqgyugh and on 19 April 2014 in Yerevan. The last clan gathering elected Prince Hrach Atabekian as the Head (tohmapet) of the House of Atabekians.

On 27 July 2012, the Atabekians were among the four aristocratic houses that initiated the restoration of the alliance of the traditional princely dynasties of the Armenian Artsakh, Melikdoms of Karabakh, by creating the Armenian Meliq Union:

== See also ==
- House of Hasan-Jalalyan

== Literature ==
1. Potto, Vassili. The First Volunteers of Karabakh. Tiflis, 1902
2. Raffi. "The Meliqdoms of Khamsa", Yerevan, 1991
3. Maghalyan, Artak. "Meliqdoms and Meliqly Houses of Artsakh". Yerevan, 2007
4. The Court Hearings of the Atabekians, "Archives of Armenia", 2008, # 1, pp. 3-27.
5. "The Roots of the Tree", "Aniv", 08.09.2008 # 5 (14)
6. Karapetyan, Armen. Critical Remarks regarding A.Maghalyan's "Meliqdoms and the Meliqly Houses of Artsakh". Historical-Philological Journal of the Armenian National Academy Of Science. 2009, # 1(243), p.246
7. Archbishop Sergius Hasan-Jalaliants. A History of the Land of Artsakh. (Edited with an Introduction by Robert H. Hewsen). Costa Mesa 2013.
