= Melikdom of Varanda =

The Melikdom of Varanda was one of the five Armenian melikdoms of the Karabakh region. It encompassed Varanda, a district located in the southeastern part of Karabakh.

The ruling meliks (princes) of the principality belonged to the Shahnazarian family, who not long before their rise to power lived in an area around Lake Sevan, from which they eventually fled. The melikdom was established in 1606, when Melik Shahnazar of Gegham installed his brother at Varanda, which he himself had received as a reward by Shah Abbas I (r. 1588–1629), the Safavid shah (king) of Iran. Prior to the takeover of the Shahnazarians, Varanda was ruled by another line of meliks, the last ruler of which was Melik Muzaffar. Varanda and the other melikdoms upheld the notion of Armenian statehood, which was used by the Safavids to fight the Ottoman Empire. The Shahnazarian family was one of the last families to lose their melikdom, which occurred in 1813, when the Russian Empire conquered it.

The seat of the meliks of Varanda was at Avetaranots (Chanakhchi). The fortress of Askeran protected the eastern frontier of the melikdom. In 1719–1724, the Karabakh Armenian military commander Avan Yuzbashi built the sghnakh (military camp) of Shushi or Shusha in Varanda. Later, Melik Shahnazar II of Varanda showed the site of Shusha to his ally Panah Ali Khan, who expanded it into a proper fortress and capital for the Karabakh Khanate.

== List of meliks ==
This list is taken from Artak Maghalyan's The Melikdoms and Melik Houses of Artsakh in the 17th-19th Centuries.

=== Pre-Shahnazarian (until c. 1606) ===
- Papi, son of Hakhijan
- Avan, son of Papi
- Agham, brother of Avan
- Pasha/Pashik, son of Avan
- Daniel
- Muzaffar

=== Shahnazarian ===
- Mirzabek I (mentioned 1606)
- Baghi I, son of Mirzabek (mentioned 1633)
- Shahnazar I, son of Baghi I (mentioned 1646, 1673)
- Baghi II, son of Shahnazar (died 1730)
- Husein, brother of Baghi II (died 1736)
- Mirzabek II, son of Baghi II (died 1744)
- Hovsep, son of Husein (died 1747)
- Shahnazar II, brother of Hovsep (died 1792)
- Jumshud, son of Shahnazar II (died 1812)
- Melik Khudadad, son of Jumshud (1793–1833); final ruler of Varanda

== Sources ==
- Bournoutian, George (1994). A History of Qarabagh: An Annotated Translation of Mirza Jamal Javanshir Qarabaghi's Tarikh-e Qarabagh. Mazda Publishers. ISBN 978-1568590110.
- Bournoutian, George (2021). From the Kur to the Aras: A Military History of Russia's Move into the South Caucasus and the First Russo-Iranian War, 1801–1813. Brill. ISBN 978-9004445154.
- Hewsen, Robert (2001). Armenia: A Historical Atlas. University of Chicago Press. ISBN 978-0226332284.
- Hewsen, Robert H. (2013). "Historical Introduction". A History of the Land of Artsakh [Karabagh and Ganje, 1722-1827]. S. Hasan-Jalaliants. Translated by Ka'ren V. Ketendjian. Costa Mesa, California: Mazda Publishers. pp. 1–61. ISBN 978-1-56859-174-2.
- Hewsen, Robert H. (1972). "The Meliks of Eastern Armenia: A Preliminary Study". Revue des Études Arméniennes. Nouvelle série. IX: 285–329.
- Małalyan, Artak (2007). Arc῾axi melik῾ut῾yunnerə ew melik῾akan tnerə XVII-XIX dd․ [The melikdoms and melik houses of Artsakh in the 17th-19th centuries] (in Armenian). Erewan: HH GAA "Gitut῾yun" hratarakč῾ut῾yun. ISBN 978-5-8080-0714-7.
- Tsibenko, Veronika (2018). "Karabakh, Nagorno". In Fleet, Kate; Krämer, Gudrun; Matringe, Denis; Nawas, John; Rowson, Everett (eds.). Encyclopaedia of Islam (3rd ed.). Brill Online. ISSN 1873-9830.
