= Movses Baghramian =

Movses Baghramian (Armenian: Մովսես Բաղրամյան) (Note: Classical orthography: Մովսէս Բաղրամեան) was an 18th-century Armenian writer and activist. He was a collaborator of the Indo-Armenian activists Joseph Emin and Shahamir Shahamirian and played an important role in running the printing press founded by Shahamirian in Madras. He wrote the work Nor tetrak vor kochi hordorak (New booklet called exhortation), which calls on Armenians to fight for the liberty of their country. It has been called "the first journalistic-political work" in the Armenian context.

== Biography ==
He was born in Karabakh and studied under a vardapet named Gevorg in Julfa. He lived for some time in Russia. In 1762–67, he cooperated with his relative Joseph Emin in the Caucasus in order to organise an Armenian uprising against Persian and Ottoman rule. Baghramian left the Caucasus after becoming convinced that Emin's plan for an uprising was unrealistic. In 1768 he settled in Madras in India and became an active member of Shahamir Shahamirian's group. Baghramian tutored Shahamirian's son Hakob in Classical Armenian and played an important role in running the printing press that the Shahamirians had founded. In 1773 Baghramian's work Nor tetrak vor kochi hordorak (New booklet called exhortation) was published at the Madras Armenian press. According to Sebouh Aslanian and Vazken Ghougassian, Baghramian co-authored the work with Hakob Shahamirian. Nor tetrak has been called "the first journalistic-political work" in the Armenian context and "the cornerstone of Armenian political literature." The work summarizes Armenian history, blaming the misfortunes of the Armenians on the despotic rule and arbitrariness of their native rulers and on Armenians' ignorance, laziness, carelessness and disunity. Hordorak calls for the Armenian youth to conduct armed struggle for the freedom of their homeland. Some scholars have interpreted Hordorak as calling for a constitutional monarchy, while others argue that it is calling for the establishment of an Armenian democratic republic.

Baghramian's work was received extremely negatively by the Armenian Catholicos Simeon of Yerevan, who saw the book's ideas as dangerous. Simeon excommunicated Baghramian from the Armenian Church. Baghramian spent the next seven years in exile in Persia, Yemen and Egypt, working as a commercial agent for Shahamir Shahamirian. The excommunication was lifted by Simeon's successor Ghukas Karnetsi in 1780 after Shahamirian's repeated requests. Movses later moved to Bombay, apparently having become wealthy as Shahamirian's agent. At one point, he was visited by his relative Joseph Emin, who writes in his autobiography that he found Movses "transformed, behaving imperiously and haughtily." In 1795 Baghramian published articles in the Madras Armenian periodical Azdarar (1794–96) under the pseudonym Hay vordi Hayi ('Armenian, son of an Armenian'). According to Tadevos Avdalbegyan, he also wrote the extended appendix to a 1796 publication of Abraham of Crete's history.
