= Pambak, Gegharkunik =

Village in Gegharkunik, Armenia

Pambak Փամբակ
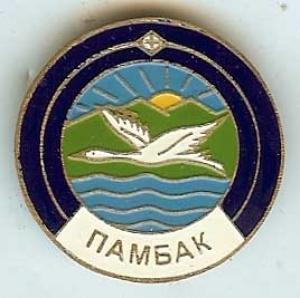
- Coat of arms

- Location within Armenia Location within Gegharkunik
- Coordinates: 40°23′10″N 45°31′55″E
- Country: Armenia
- Province: Gegharkunik
- Municipality: Vardenis

Population (2011)
  - Total: 548
- Time zone: UTC+4 (AMT)

Pambak (Armenian: Փամբակ) is a village in the Vardenis Municipality of the Gegharkunik Province of Armenia. There are churches, a caravanserai, and cemeteries in the village. In 1988-1989 Armenian refugees from Azerbaijan settled in the village, including former inhabitants of Zaylik (Armenian: Փիփ, romanized: Pip) in Azerbaijan.
