= Melik =

Armenian noble title

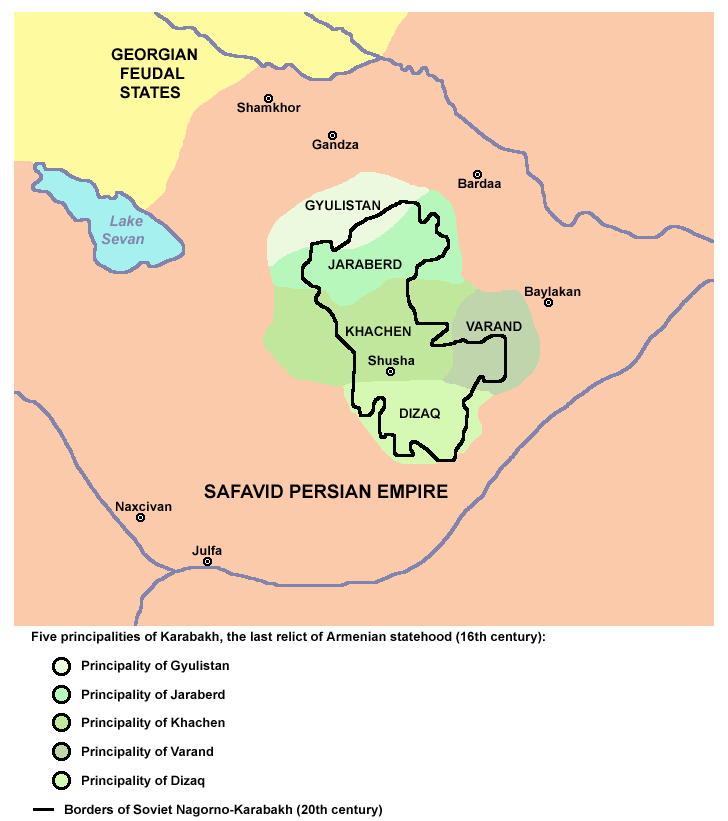
The five principalities of Karabagh (Gyulistan, Jraberd, Khachen, Varanda, Dizak), the last remnant of Armenian statehood (16th century)

Мelik (Armenian: մելիք, romanized: melik’, from Arabic: ملك, romanized: malik, lit. 'king') was a hereditary Armenian noble title used in Eastern Armenia from the Late Middle Ages until the nineteenth century. The meliks represented some of the last remnants of the old Armenian nobility, as well as Persian nobility in Shirvan and other areas of the Persian Empire. The most prominent and powerful meliks were those of Karabagh (Artsakh) and Syunik, which ruled autonomous or semi-autonomous principalities known as melikdoms (Armenian: մելիքություն, romanized: melik’ut’yun) under Iranian suzerainty. Meliks also existed in Yerevan, Nakhichevan, Sevan, Lori, Northwestern Persia, and other areas, although outside of Karabagh and Syunik most were merely hereditary leaders of local Armenian communities, not rulers of principalities.

The meliks of Karabagh each had their troops and military fortifications known as sghnakhs. They ruled on legal disputes within their territory and collected tax. The meliks of Karabagh saw themselves as the last bastion of Armenian independence in the region. After the conquest of Eastern Armenia by the Russian Empire, the meliks were generally not recognized as princes, but only as untitled nobles. Many of them, especially meliks from Karabagh, became Russian generals.

== History ==
=== Origins ===
The conquest of Armenia by successive foreign dynasties during the medieval period dealt severe blows to the traditional Armenian nobility. By the end of Mongol rule in Armenia, the old social structure of Armenia had been virtually destroyed and the great princely houses had mostly disappeared. Remnants of these princely houses survived in a few places, most notably in the mountainous and strategically important regions of Karabagh (part of historical Artsakh province) and Syunik, where they retained their autonomy. Old Armenian titles fell out of use and were replaced with the flexible term melik, which was used to refer to any of the remnants of the Armenian nobility, whether successors of the great princely houses or of the lower gentry (azats). Later, the term was used to refer to even lower layers of elites, such as municipal and village chiefs in charge of duties such as tax collection. Outside of Karabagh and Syunik, most people bearing the title of melik were merely hereditary leaders of local Armenian communities, rather than (semi-)autonomous rulers. According to historian Robert H. Hewsen, all of the melik houses of Karabagh and probably most of those of Syunik were descended from branches of the Syuni dynasty. Besides the meliks of Karabagh, Syunik, Lori and Somkhiti, the other meliks of Eastern Armenia cannot be proven to have been of princely origin, although the highly influential Aghamalian meliks of Yerevan were almost certainly of princely extraction. The other, minor meliks may have been descendants of the gentry or local headmen and larger landowners who were raised to the status of melik.

=== Melikdoms of Karabagh and Syunik ===
The meliks of Karabagh (Artsakh) and Syunik were the successors of the earlier Armenian lords of those regions, mainly of Syuni origin, who had maintained their autonomy following the Seljuk conquest of Armenia in the tenth century. The Armenian lords of Artsakh and part of Syunik were more or less united from the tenth century under the Principality of Khachen. (Note: Hewsen refers to the Principality of Khachen as the Kingdom of Artsakh, at least for the period 1000 to 1266, when its rulers used a royal title.) Khachen reached its peak in the thirteenth century under the Hasan-Jalalian family, although the principality was later broken up and weakened because of the attacks of foreign conquerors. In the mid-fifteenth century, the Qara Qoyunlu ruler Jahan Shah placed a number of territories along the northern frontier of his realm under the control of the Armenian nobles of Karabagh and Syunik, many of whom had earlier been dispossessed by Timur. They were granted the title of melik and allowed broad autonomy. (Note: Bagrat Ulubabyan places the de facto appearance of the five melikdoms of Karabagh in the second half of the 16th century and the official recognition of the melikdoms during the reign of Shah Abbas I rather than Jahan Shah.) The meliks of Karabagh and Syunik retained their autonomous status under Safavid rule, although they were weakened as a result of the devastating Ottoman–Safavid wars in the sixteenth century. During the reign of Shah Abbas I (r. 1588–1629), the Safavids confirmed and increased the rights of the meliks and apparently raised new people to the status of melik. Succession of a new melik was confirmed by a decree of the shah, but was actually hereditary, with the eldest son or sometimes a younger brother of the melik succeeding him.

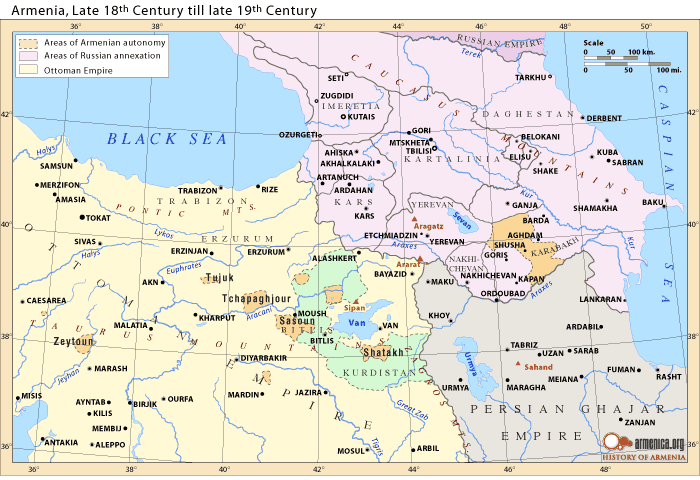
Armenian autonomy during late 18th-late 19th century in orange, including Karabagh

The five Armenian melikdoms of Karabagh, known as the Khamsa melikdoms, were Gulistan, Jraberd, Varanda, Khachen, and Dizak. These five principalities were ruled by the Beglarian, Israelian, Shahnazarian, Hasan-Jalalian, and Avanian families, respectively. The Khamsa melikdoms formed a league against their foreign enemies, but they also competed with each other. The melidom of Tsar was geographically in Karabagh but not a part of the Khamsa melikdoms' league. There were four important melikdoms in Syunik: Sisian (or Angeghakot), Ghapan (or Bekh), Tatev and Kashatagh. Sisian was ruled by the Tangians, Tatev and Ghapan by branches of the Parsadanians, and Kashatagh by the Haykazians (from which branched off the Israelians of Jraberd). To the north, near Lake Sevan (Gökche), there were the minor melikdoms of Gegham and Gardman. These two were ruled by branches of the Shahnazarian (originally Shahanshah or Ulubekian) family which later took over Varanda.

The meliks of Karabagh and, to a lesser extent, Syunik were fully autonomous and held executive, legislative, judicial, military, and fiscal authority over their territories. They issued their own decrees, ruled on legal disputes and criminal cases and collected their own taxes, from which they paid tribute to the Iranian shah. They were often responsible for maintaining more than one fortress, called sghnakhs. They had their own military forces consisting of one to two thousand infantrymen, although more troops could be raised in emergencies. A melik had his own banner (droshak), commander (zoravar), and his subordinates, the chiliarchs (hazarapets) and centurions (haryurapets or yuzbashis). These officers were often members of the melik's family. Despite the name, the centurions or yuzbashis were not literally the commanders of a hundred men, but rather vassals of the meliks, either hereditarily or by appointment, who controlled two or more villages and furnished a certain number of troops under his own banner.

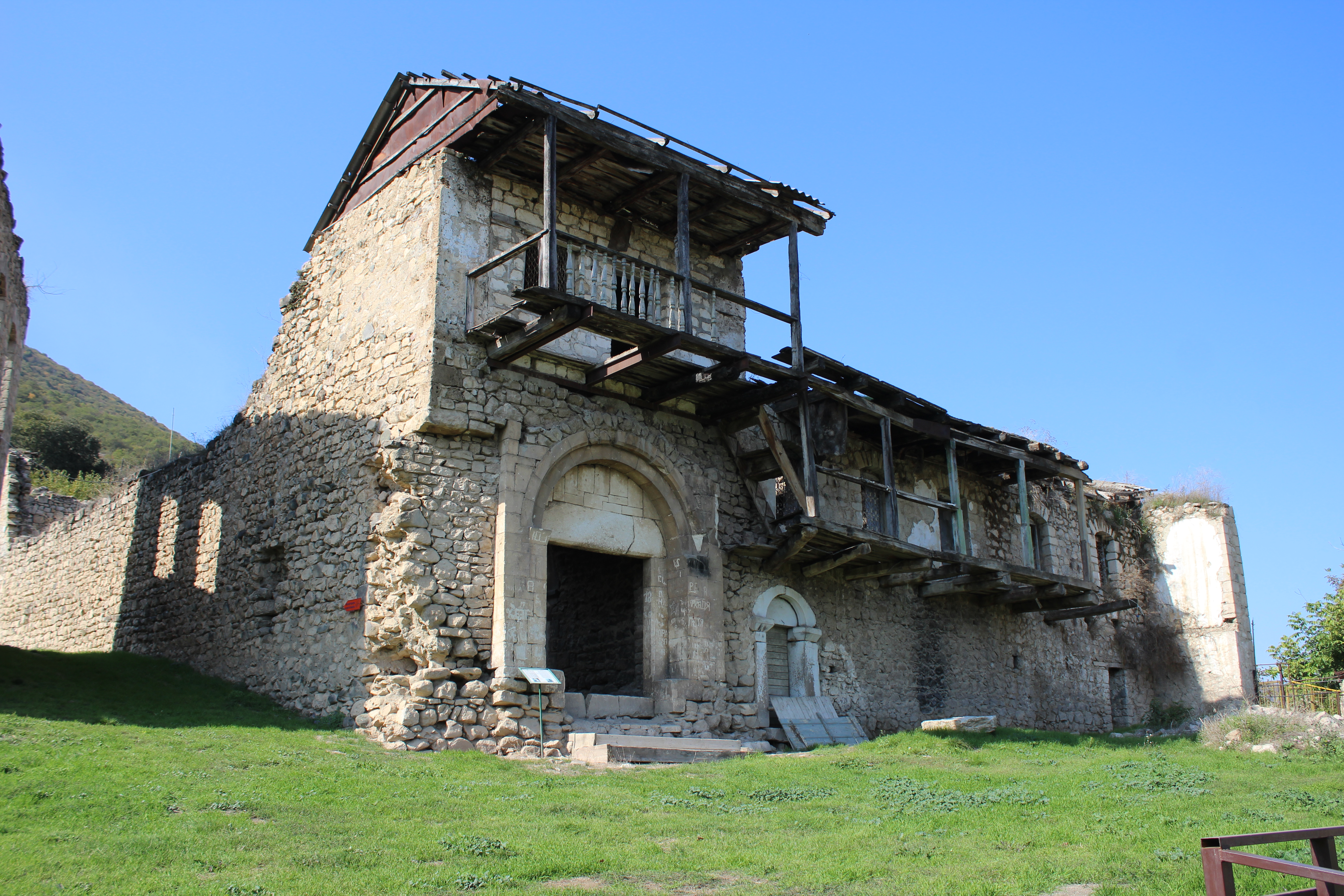
A building of the residence of the meliks of Dizak in Tugh (Togh) in Karabagh

The meliks of Karabagh saw themselves as the saw themselves as the last bastion of Armenian independence in the region and sometimes claimed to speak on behalf of the entire Armenian people in their communications with foreign rulers. The meliks played an especially prominent role in Armenian political life from 1678 until the Russian annexation of Eastern Armenia in 1828. In 1678, Catholicos Hakob Jughayetsi called a secret meeting at Etchmiadzin with leading meliks and members of the clergy, where he proposed accepting Catholicism in exchange for European protection. A delegation of meliks headed by the Catholicos set out for Rome, but the mission was abandoned after the Catholicos died on the journey. Only the young Israel Ori of the Haikazian family went on to Europe. Ori spent much of his life trying to convince a European ruler, first Johann Wilhelm, Elector Palatine and later Peter the Great, to conquer Iranian Armenia with the help of the meliks. He did not succeed, but his activities contributed to Armenian elites seeing Russia as an ally and liberator of the Armenians. The collapse of Safavid power and the Russian invasion of Iran in 1722 raised Armenian hopes of liberation from Muslim rule. The meliks of Syunik and Karabagh raised a rebellion against the local Turkic tribal lords under the leadership of Avan Yuzbashi and Davit Bek, an Armenian from Georgia of possible melik extraction. The rebels were soon faced with an Ottoman invasion, which they resisted successfully in Syunik and Karabagh at least until the deaths of Davit and his successor Mkhitar Sparapet in 1728 and 1730.

In 1735, Nader Khan Afshar drove the Ottomans out of the South Caucasus and was crowned Nader Shah the next year. Nader reconfirmed the autonomy of the meliks of Karabagh and recognized Karabagh and Zangezur as semi-autonomous regions. After Nader's death in 1747, chaos beset Iran again, allowing the Muslim khanates to reassert their power in the Caucasus. During this time, Melik Shahnazar of Varanda allied himself with Panah Khan Javanshir, the chieftain of a Turkic tribe, against other Armenian meliks, which ultimately led to the downfall of the autonomous Armenian melikdoms of Karabagh.

=== Other meliks ===
There were also melikdoms in southern Georgia: in Lori, Aghstev and Pambaki. The Armenians of Tbilisi had their own melik from the Bebutian family. There were twelve melikdoms in Nakhichevan. South of the Aras River, there were meliks in Maku, Marand, Khoy, and Karadagh and Salmast. There were at least eleven meliks in the Erivan Khanate, including those of the Aghamalians, Geghamians, Loris-Melikians, Arghutians, and so on. There were four semi-autonomous meliks in the Khanate of Ganja, who, according to Raffi, had good relations with the Khan. Further east, there was one melik each in Shaki, Shamakhi, and Baku. There were also meliks in Surmalu who claimed descent from the ancient noble house of Kamsarakan.

==== Meliks of Erivan ====
From the mid-seventeenth century until 1828, the Armenians of the province (or khanate) of Erivan were under the authority of the Aghamalian meliks of Yerevan (Erivan). Each mahal (district) of the province with a significant Armenian population had its own melik as a hereditary leader, who, along with the Armenian village headmen, answered to the melik of Yerevan. The melik of Yerevan was the most powerful non-religious leader in the province after the sardar (governor). He was appointed directly by the shah and on some occasions dealt with him directly. The meliks of Yerevan accumulated great wealth from their properties and the tribute they received from all the Armenian villages of the province. The Aghamalian meliks had full administrative, legislative and judicial powers over the Armenians under their authority save for the death penalty, which remained the sole right of the sardar. The melik also appointed the commander of the Armenian infantry units that served in the sardar's army. The Aghamalians' exact origin cannot be determined, but their high degree of authority and their high-level marriage alliances (for example, with the royal house of Georgia) strongly suggests a princely origin.

=== After Russian conquest ===
After the Russian conquest of Karabagh in 1813, the meliks of Karabagh were reduced to untitled nobles with the word "melik" incorporated into their surnames. Save for a few exceptions, the meliks were generally not officially recognized as princes in the Russian Empire. Some meliks remained on their ancestral properties after the Russian conquest. The descendants of the meliks of Karabagh formed a large part of Russian Armenian "high society" in major cities such as Baku, Tbilisi, Moscow and Saint Petersburg.

== Melik families of Eastern Armenia ==
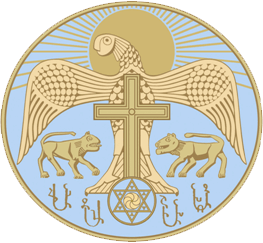
Flag of the Hasan-Jalalian family

Altogether, there were between 70 and 90 melikal houses in Eastern Armenia, mostly in the provinces of Artsakh, Gardman, Syunik, Lori, Yerevan, Nakhichevan, Kashatagh, and Karadagh. Below is the incomplete list of some of the most prominent Armenian melik houses:

(15th–19th centuries)

- Melik Hasan-Jalalian (meliks of Khachen before 1755)
- Melik-Avanian (Meliks of Dizak)
- Melik-Mirzakhanian (meliks of Khachen-Khndzristan after 1755)
- Melik-Shahnazarian (meliks of Varanda)
- Melik-Beglarian (meliks of Gulistan)
- Melik-Haykayzan (meliks of Kashatagh)
- Melik-Israelian (meliks of Jraberd before 1783)
- Melik-Alaverdian (meliks of Jraberd in 1783 - 1814)
- Melik Atabekian (meliks of Jraberd since 1814 - mid-1850s)
- Meliks of Barsum (Utik)
- Meliks of Getashen (Utik)
- Meliks of Khachakap (Utik)
- Meliks of Voskanapat (Utik)

== Prominent members of melik families ==
- Israel Ori (1658–1711)
- David Bek (d. 1728)
- Melik Shahnazar II (d. 1792)
- Avan-khan (d. 1744)
- Valerian Madatov (1782–1829)
- Count Loris-Melikov (1825–1888)

== Popular culture ==
The meliks of Karabagh and Syunik inspired the historical novel David Bek (1882) by Raffi, the opera David Bek (1950) by Armen Tigranian and the novel Mkhitar Sparapet (1961) by Sero Khanzadyan. In 1944, the film David Bek was released and in 1978, Armenfilm in association with Mosfilm produced another movie about the efforts of David Bek and Mkhitar Sparapet called Star of Hope (Huso astgh).
