= Melikdoms of Karabakh =

Armenian feudal entities

Khamsa Melikdoms Խամսայի մելիքություններ
- 1603–1822
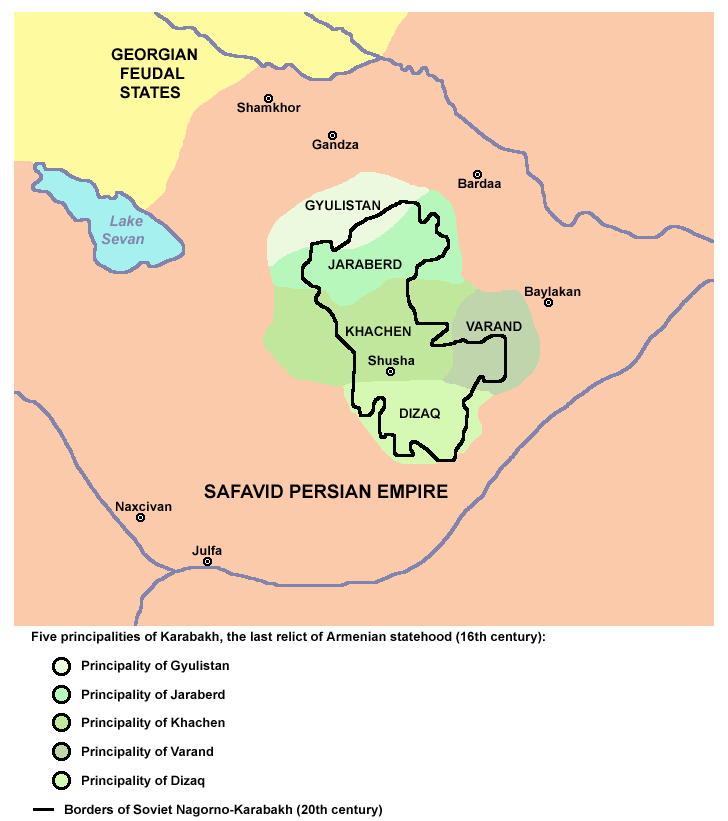
- The five principalities of Karabakh (16th century)
- Status: Principality
- Common languages: Armenian
- Religion: Armenian Apostolic
- Government: Principality (Melikdom)
- Historical era: Iranian Armenia
  - Established: 1603
  - Disestablished: 1822
Preceded by	Succeeded by
Principality of Khachen	Russian Empire
- Today part of: Azerbaijan

The Five Melikdoms of Karabakh, also known as Khamsa Melikdoms (Armenian: Խամսայի մելիքություններ, romanized: Khamsayi melikutyunner), were Armenian feudal entities on the territory of modern Nagorno-Karabakh and neighboring lands, from the dissolution of the Principality of Khachen in the 15th century to the abolition of ethnic feudal entities by the Russian Empire in 1822.

== Etymology ==
Khamsa, also spelled Khamse or simply Khams means 'five' in Arabic. The principalities were ruled by meliks. The term melik (Armenian: Մելիք) meliq, from Arabic: ملك malik ('king'), designates an Armenian noble title in various Eastern Armenian lands. The principalities ruled by meliks became known in English academic literature as melikdoms or melikates.

== History ==
=== Background ===
There were several Armenian melikates (dominions ruled by meliks) in various parts of historical Armenia: in Yerevan, Kars, Nakhichevan, Gegharkunik, Lori, Artsakh, Utik, Iranian Azerbaijan and Syunik.

The Five Melikdoms were ruled by dynasties that represented branches of the earlier Hasan-Jalalyan dynasty and were descendants of the medieval kings of Artsakh.

After the erosion of united Armenian statehood under pressure from the Seljuk Empire and Mongols, the Five Melikdoms were the most independent of all analogous Armenian principalities and saw themselves as holding onto the last bastion of Armenian independence.

=== Autonomy ===
The realm of the meliks in Karabakh was almost always semi-independent and often fully independent. The meliks had their recruit armies headed by centurions, their own castles and fortresses. The military complexes that contained recruiting organizations, fortification systems, signal beacons, and logistical support were known as sghnakhs (Armenian: սղնախ, romanized: sġnax). There were two large sghnakhs shared by all meliks of Karabakh - the Major Sghnakh and the Lesser Sghnakh. The Major Sghnakh was located in the melikdoms of Gulistan (Vardut), Jraberd and Khachen and was supported by the fortresses of Gulistan, Jraberd, Havkakhaghats, Ishkhanaberd, Kachaghakaberd and Levonaberd. The Lesser Sghnakh was located in the melikdoms of Varanda and Dizak, and was supported by the fortresses Shushi, Togh, and Goroz. Both the Lesser and Major Sghnakhs were parts of a legacy defense system that remained from the times of the Kingdom of Artsakh.

The relationship between meliks and their subordinates was that of a military commanding officer and junior officer, and not of feudal lord and a serf. Peasants were often allowed to own land, were free and owned property.

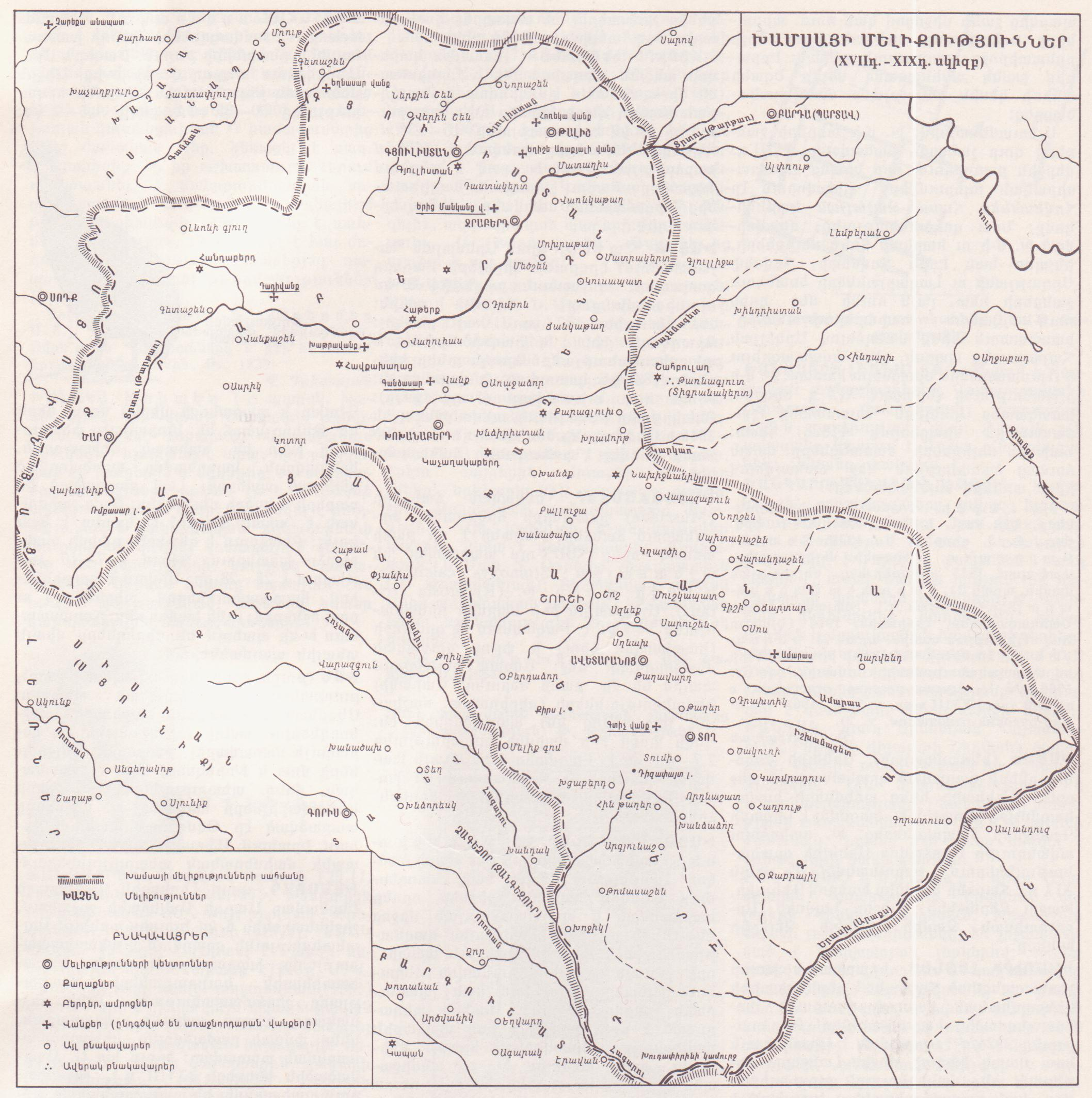
Khamsa's five principalities in the 17th—19th centuries (in Armenian).

The five Armenian principalities (melikdoms) in Karabakh were as follows:

- Melikdom of Gulistan - under the leadership of the Melik Beglarian family
- Melikdom of Jraberd - under the leadership of the Melik Israelian family, followed by the Alaverdians family in the 18th century and finally ruled by the princely house of Atabekian in the 19th century
- Melikdom of Khachen - under the leadership of the Hasan-Jalalyans (and at the end of 18th century partially ruled by melik Mirzahanyan)
- Melikdom of Varanda (until early 17th century part of principality of Dizak) - under the leadership of the Melik Shahnazarian family
- Melikdom of Dizak - under the leadership of the Melik Avanian family.

The Hasan-Jalalyans, who ruled the Principality of Khachen, were especially important and were considered the most senior of the Five Melikdoms. They symbolised the connection between patriarch Hayk, the eponymous progenitor of the Armenian people, considered as a great-grandson of Noah, and medieval monarchs that ruled Armenia in the Middle Ages.

Hasan-Jalal traced his descent to the Aranshahik, a family that predated the establishment of the Arsacid dynasty of Armenia in the region. Hasan-Jalal's ancestry was "almost exclusively" Armenian according to historian Robert H. Hewsen.

Much of Hasan-Jalal Dawla's family roots were entrenched in an intricate array of royal marriages with new and old Armenian nakharar families. Hasan-Jalal's grandfather was Hasan I (also known as Hasan the Great), a prince who ruled over the northern half of Artsakh. In 1182, he stepped down as ruler of the region and entered monastery life at Dadivank, and divided his land into two: the southern half (comprising much of Khachen) went to his oldest son Vahtang II (also known as Tangik) and the northern half went to the youngest, Gregory "the Black." Vahtang II married Khorishah Zakarian, who was herself the daughter of Sargis Zakarian, the originator of the Zakarid line of Armenian princes in Georgia. When he married the daughter of the Arranshahik king of Dizak-Balk, Mamkan, Hasan-Jalal also inherited his father-in-law's lands.

In medieval times, the Hasan-Jalalyans branched into two functionally separate but connected lines: landed princes who ruled the Melikdom of Khachen and clergymen who manned the throne of Catholicos of Aghvank at the Holy See of Gandzasar of the Armenian Apostolic Church. The clerical branch of the family was especially important. In 1441, a top military commander from the Hasan-Jalalyans in the service of the Kara Koyunlu orchestrated the return of the Holy See of the Armenian Apostolic Church from the Mediterranean town of Sis in Cilicia to its traditional location at Etchmadzin in Armenia. Shortly after the event, Grigor X Jalalbegiants (1443–1465), representing the clerical branch of the Hasan-Jalalyans, was enthroned as the Catholicos of All Armenians at Etchmadzin.

The people of the principalities of Karabakh considered themselves direct descendants of the Kingdom of Armenia, and were recognized as such by foreign powers.

The autonomous status of Armenian meliks in Karabakh was confirmed and re-confirmed by successive rulers of Persia. In 1603 Shah Abbas I recognized their special semi-independent status by a special edict.

However, instability in Safavid Iran and Armenian frustration with Islamic dominance. in the late 17th and early 18th centuries, turned Karabakh into the epicenter of plans for an independent Armenian state. This state, centered on the semi-independent Armenian principalities of Artsakh and Syunik, would be allied with Georgia and both would be protected by fellow Christian Russia and European powers. Eventually the meliks agreed to pursue such an alliance. In 1678, Catholicos Hakob Jughayetsi (Jacob of Jugha, 1655–1680) called for a secret meeting in Echmiadzin to which he invited both meliks and clergy. He offered to lead a delegation to Europe, but died shortly after, largely causing the plan to be abandoned, but for the determination of one of the delegates, a young man, the son of Melik Haikazyan of Kashatag / Khnatsakh in Zankezur / Syunik. named Israel Ori, who had served in the armies of Louis XIV of France, he tried to convince Johann Wilhelm, Elector Palatine (1658–1716), Pope Innocent XII and the Emperor of Austria, Leopold I to liberate Armenia from a foreign yoke and to send large amounts of money to the armed forces of Karabakh Armenians. Unfortunately Ori died in 1711 before securing unified support for Armenian lands. Another prominent figure from Nagorno-Karabakh who worked to establish an independent Armenian entity in his homeland was Movses Baghramian. Baghramian together with the Armenian patriot Joseph Emin (1726–1809), lobbied Karabakh's Armenian meliks to this same effect.

In the early 18th century, Persia's Nader Shah took Karabakh out of control of the Ganja khans as punishment for their support of the Safavids, and placed it under his own control in which he granted the Armenian meliks supreme command over neighboring Armenian principalities as well as Muslim khans in the Caucasus, in return for the meliks' victories over the invading Ottoman Turks in the 1720s. However, the Armenian meliks were only able to maintain autonomous control over the region until the mid-18th century.

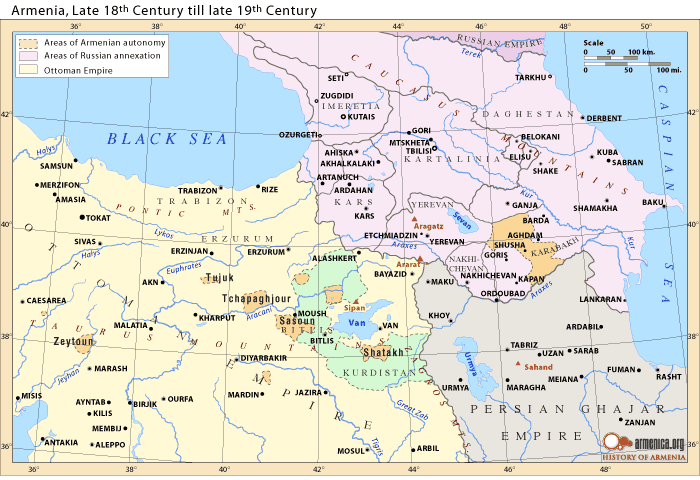
Armenian autonomy during late 18th to late 19th century in orange, including Karabakh

=== Karabakh Khanate ===
The beginning of the end of the Khamsa Melikdoms of Karabakh came in the second half of the 18th century, when Melik Shahnazar II allied himself with the Khan, Panah Ali Khan of the Javanshir clan of the Afshar-Oghuz Turkic tribe, against the other Armenian meliks which led to the disintegration of the autonomous Armenian Melikdoms of Karabakh into the de facto independent Karabakh Khanate. Melik Shahnazar II was the first to accept Panah-Ali Khan's suzerainty as the first Khan of the Karabakh Khanate and provided the latter with the strategic fortress of Shushi.

=== Dissolution and Integration into the Russian Empire ===
The region came under Russian control in 1806 during the Russo-Persian War of 1804 to 1813, and was formally annexed in 1813 following the signing of the Treaty of Gulistan. The Russian Empire recognized the sovereign status of the five Armenian princes in their domains by a charter of the Emperor Paul I dated 2 June 1799.

In 1822, the Russian Empire abolished ethnic feudal formations, and the territory previously ruled by the Five Melikdoms subsequently became part of the newly formed Elisabethpol Governorate, as part of the Elizavetpol, Jevanshir, Jebrail, and Shusha uezds ("counties"). Meliks preserved their rights and privileges after the rest of Eastern Armenia became part of the Russian Empire. Many of them became high-ranking military officers in the Imperial Russian Army.

=== Legacy ===
The name "Mountainous Karabakh" (Russian: Наго́рный Караба́х, romanized: Nagorny Karabakh) came to become the most prominent name for the region controlled by the Five Armenian Melikdoms ("Mountainous" as opposed to the lowland steppes of the Karabakh region). It maintained a strong Armenian presence and identity up into the modern age. It became the scene of several ethnic conflicts with neighboring Azerbaijanis, including the establishment of the Armenian-populated Nagorno-Karabakh Autonomous Oblast within Azerbaijan SSR under the Soviet Union in the early 20th century, and the Karabakh movement in the late 20th century which led to the First Nagorno-Karabakh War amid the dissolution of the Soviet Union, and the establishment of the Armenian Republic of Artsakh.

== Literature and art ==
The meliks of Karabakh inspired the historical novel David Bek (1882) by Raffi, the opera David Bek (1950) by Armen Tigranian and the novel Mkhitar Sparapet (1961) by Sero Khanzadyan. In 1944, David Bek the movie was filmed and in 1978, Armenfilm in association with Mosfilm produced another movie about the efforts of Davit Bek and Mkhitar Sparapet called Huso Astgh (Star of Hope).
