= Israel Ori =

Armenian diplomat

Israel Ori Իսրայել Օրի
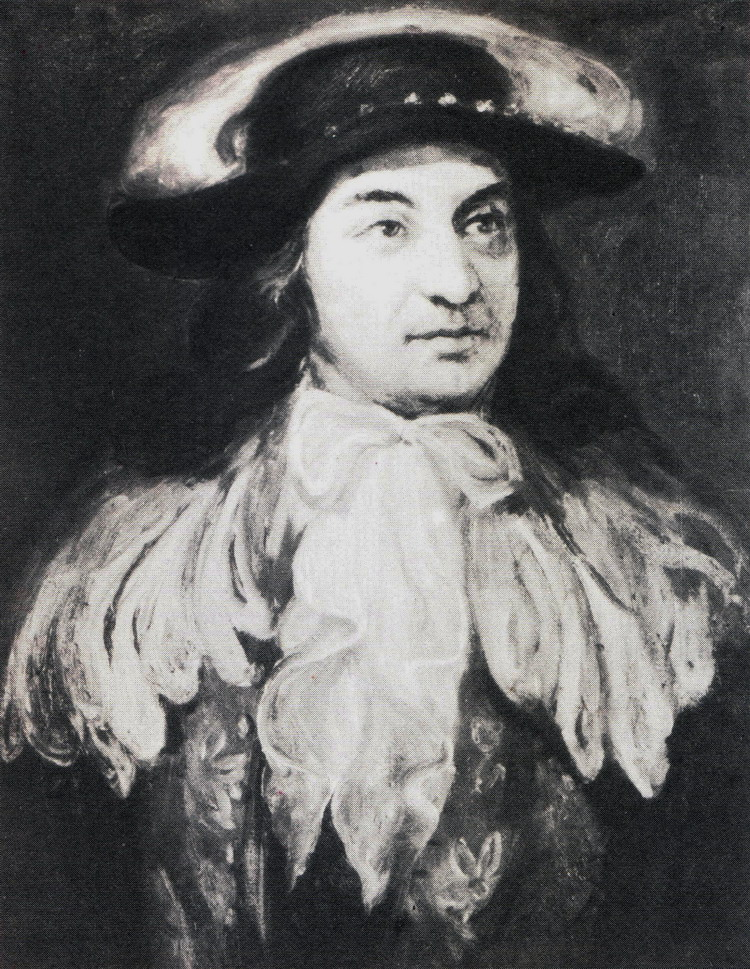
- Born: 1659; Sisian, Safavid Armenia
- Died: 1711 (aged 51–52); Astrakhan, Russian Empire
- Resting place: Astrakhan, Russian Empire

Israel Ori (Armenian: Իսրայել Օրի; (Note: Traditional orthography: Իսրայէլ Օրի) 1659–1711) was a prominent Armenian figure and diplomat who sought to liberate Armenia from Persian and Ottoman rule.

== Early life ==
Ori was born in 1659, probably in the village of Sisian or in the surrounding district of the same name. Sisian is located in the region of Syunik (modern-day southern Armenia), which was commonly known as Ghapan at the time. (Note: The place-name Ghapan (Armenian: Ղափան) was used in different senses in Ori's time and particularly in his letters. It referred to the territory of the historical Armenian province of Syunik or even one particular district within that territory. But Ghapan could also be used in a broad sense to refer to the entire mountainous region between the river valleys of the Kura and the Aras.) His father's name was Israel, which Ori placed before his given name. According to one theory, his given name was Avri (a variant of Yavri), which he rendered in French as Auri or Aury; this, in turn, transformed into Ori or Ory, according to the French pronunciation.

Ori claimed descent from the Proshian noble family. His father is identified as a melik; in Karabakh and Syunik, the meliks were hereditary rulers of autonomous or semi-autonomous Armenian principalities under Safavid Iranian suzerainty. According to historian Ashot Hovhannisian, Ori's family was caught in a struggle with the Safavid governor (khan) of Nakhichevan, who sought to reduce their authority and murdered several members of the family (including, eventually, Ori's father) to this end. Since Ori mentions no meliks in Sisian related to him after his own father, Hovhannisian concludes that the family had lost their secular authority by the late 17th century. According to Robert H. Hewsen, Ori was a member the melik family of Zangezur, a branch of which established itself as meliks of Jraberd in Karabakh in 1687.

In 1677, the Armenian catholicos, Hakob of Julfa, called a secret meeting of secular and religious leaders in Etchmiadzin with the intention of appealing to the European powers to help free Armenia from Muslim rule. The participants voted to send a delegation led by the Catholicos to Europe. Among the nobles elected to the delegation was Ori's father, Melik Israel. The delegation reached Constantinople. Melik Israel was forced by circumstances to return to Armenia, but he left with the Catholicos his twenty-year-old son, Ori. Catholicos Hakob died in Constantinople in August 1680. Rather than return home, Ori decided to continue on to Europe with the help of some Armenian merchants. He spent some time in Venice before moving on to France. There is no indication that Ori pursued any political goals during his time in Venice and France.

In France, Ori sold supplies to the French army, then entered military service himself, first as a lieutenant in the infantry and later as a cavalry captain. He fought for the French against the English from 1688 to 1695, during the Nine Years' War. He was taken prisoner in 1695, and after being released he moved to the Rhenish Palatinate. According to his later collaborator, Minas Vardapet, Ori married and had children, and another source reports that he converted to Catholicism.

== Life in Germany ==
In 1695 Ori settled in Germany, in the city of Düsseldorf, where he established connections with Johann Wilhelm, Elector Palatine. Hoping that the question of Armenia would become the object of consideration in the highest diplomatic circles of European states, German prince sent Ori with a letter of recommendation to the emperor of Austria and the ruler of Florence. However, since Ori did not have official authority from the Armenian political mainstream, his statements were disregarded. Ori departed to Armenia with the purpose to obtain the appropriate written documents from the Armenian nobility on the advice of Johann Wilhelm. In 1699 Ori, together with melik Safraz called in Angekhakot a secret conference along with eleven Syunik Meliks, where they agreed to officially ask for military aid from West European states. Ori met with Emperor Leopold I in 1700 who advised him that Russian support would be necessary for the success of his plan. Without having attained results in Germany and Austria, Ori in 1701 left for Moscow.

== The Armenia plan ==
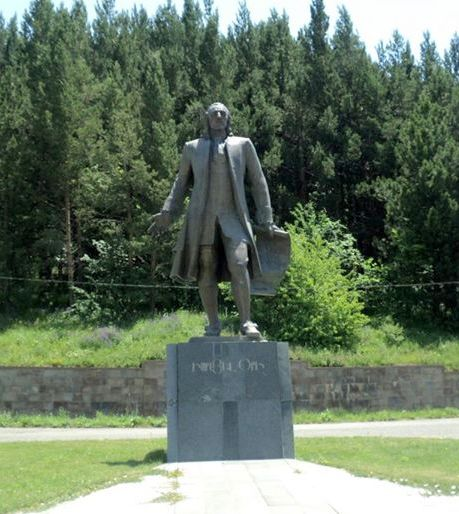
Israel Ori's statue in Jermuk, Armenia

Ori was the first to set the pro-Russian orientation of a move to liberate Armenia in the decades to come. After arriving in Moscow, Ori met Peter the Great and presented the request from the meliks of Syunik where they had written that "we do not have another hope, we hope for God and your country." Peter responded favorably. He promised to render assistance to the Armenian people after the end of Russo-Swedish War. In the meantime Ori also met with Pope Clement XI in 1704 who offered him his support. Ori proposed to the Russian court a plan, which contained the following points: for liberating the Armenian and Georgian peoples it is necessary to send via the Caucasus a twenty-five thousand strong Russian army, fifteen thousand Cossack riders and ten thousand infantrymen.

Cavalry must move to Transcaucasia with the road, which passes on the Daryal gorge, and infantry should cross from Astrakhan on the Caspian Sea. Russian troops will meet the Armenian and Georgian armed forces. Thus, even in the beginning of the 18th century within the Russian court the question about the preparation for a march in Transcaucasia was raised. It was agreed that a special envoy should be sent to Persia headed by Ori, to study the situation, the will of the locals, gather information on the fortresses and roads of the country and so forth. In order not to excite suspicions, Ori would say that he was sent by the Pope of Rome, to the court of Shah Husayn for the purpose of gathering information on the well-being of the Christians in Persia. In 1707, after the necessary preparations, Ori with the rank of the Colonel of Russian army and with the large formation solemnly went to Persia. The French missionaries in Persia attempted to prevent the arrival of Ori into Isfahan, trying to convince the Shah that Russia was intending to restore the political independence of Armenia, and that Ori intends to be the King of Armenia.

When Ori reached Shamakhi, he was forced to wait several days before being granted permission to enter Isfahan. In Shamakhi he met local Armenian and Georgian political figures, strengthening their sympathies towards Russia. In 1709 Ori arrived in Isfahan, where he again conducted negotiations with the local political figures. In 1711 Ori suddenly died in Astrakhan during the return to Russia from Persia. He appears to have been poisoned by some members of the entourage with which he visited Persia. He had acquired various goods in Persia, some of which he intended to present to Peter the Great. Some of his belongings were stolen in Isfahan, for which he arrested two members of his party, Captain Zakhar Vishtok and his wife, and sent them to Astrakhan. Instead of punishing the thieves, the governor of Kazan and Astrakhan, Apraksin, colluded with them and took actions to delay Ori's arrival in Astrakhan. In order to prevent Ori from taking action against them and to steal the rest of his goods, they poisoned him. Ori's collaborator, Minas Vardapet, referred to Ori's murder in a letter to Pope Clement XI, as did Catholicos Esayi of Aghvank in a letter to Peter the Great. (Note: In the Armenian Soviet Encyclopedia, V. Diloyan writes about Ori's death only that he "died suddenly in murky circumstances". Similarly, in a biography of Ori by A. G. Abrahamian, the author states only that Ori "died suddenly in Astrakhan".) He was buried by an Armenian church in Astrakhan, although the exact location of his grave is unknown. A local Armenian priest reportedly saw Ori's grave in 1950, at the intersection of Chetvyortaya Narodnaya and Glavnaya Prodolnaya streets; but by 1955 as a result of construction work some of the graves in that area had been moved and others had remained underground. In 1955, two Armenian scholars confirmed that there were graves at that site but were unable to conduct further excavations.

All of Ori's efforts helped to inspire Joseph Emin (1726–1809), who went on to keep the idea of the liberation of Armenia alive.
