= Zəylik, Dashkasan =

Zəylik Փիփ • Pip
- Municipality
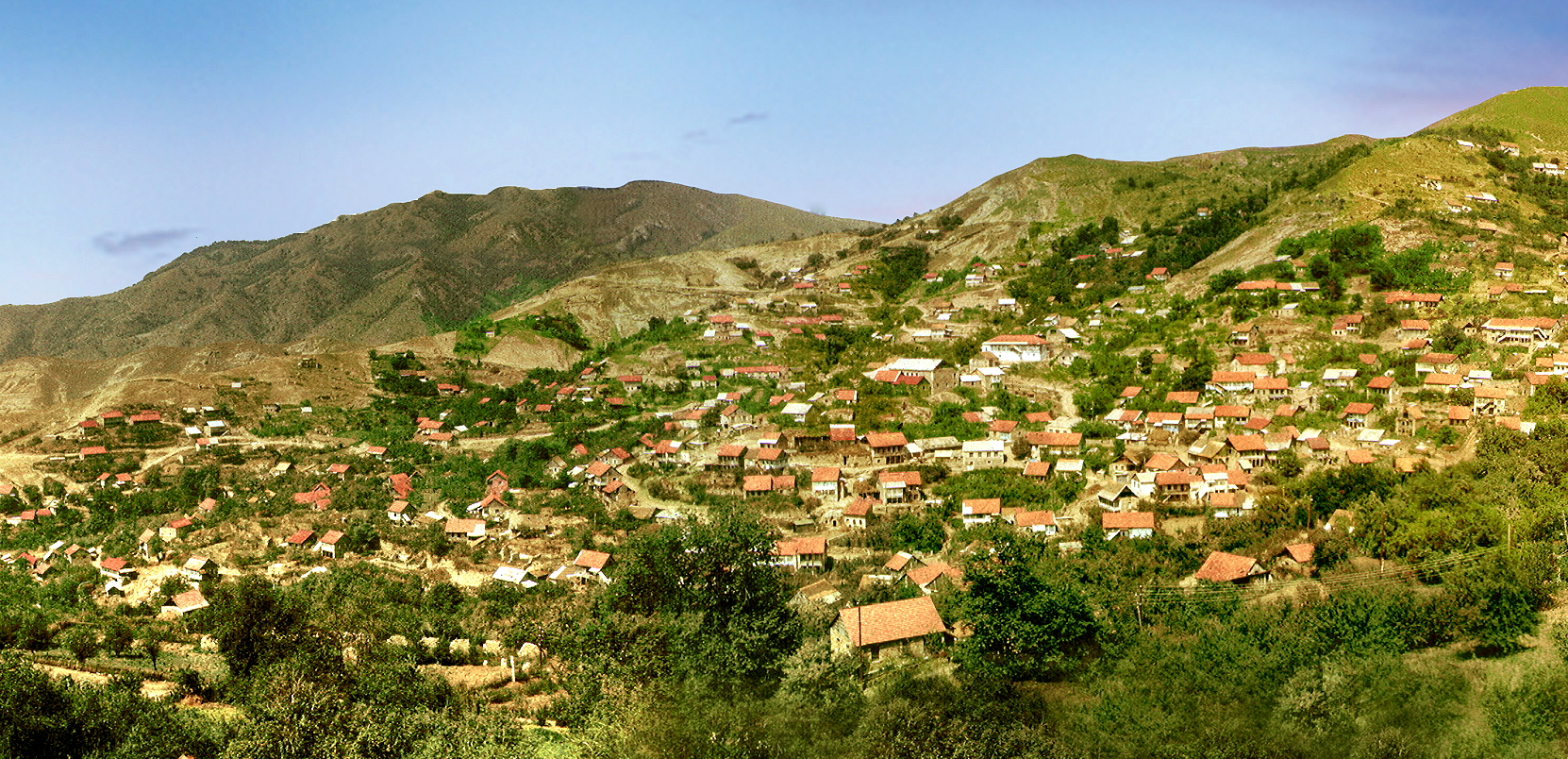

- Location within Azerbaijan
- Coordinates: 40°33′11″N 46°00′32″E
- Country: Azerbaijan
- District: Dashkasan

Population
  - Total: 357
- Time zone: UTC+4 (AZT)

Zəylik (Zaylik; Armenian: Զագլիկ, romanized: Zaglik; Armenian: Փիփ, romanized: Pip) is a village and municipality in the Dashkasan District of Azerbaijan. It has a population of 357. The village had an Armenian population before the exodus of Armenians from Azerbaijan after the outbreak of the Nagorno-Karabakh conflict. Many of the villagers settled in Pambak in Armenia.
