= Bolshaya Sala =

Bolshaya Sala Большая Сала
- Village
- Location within Vladimir Oblast Location within Russia
- Coordinates: 55°18′N 41°50′E
- Country: Russia
- Region: Vladimir Oblast
- District: Melenkovsky District
- Time zone: UTC+3:00

Bolshaya Sala (Russian: Больша́я Сала) is a rural locality (a village) in Lyakhovskoye Rural Settlement, Melenkovsky District, Vladimir Oblast, Russia. The population was 40 as of 2010. There are 3 streets.

== Geography ==
Bolshaya Sala is located 17 km (11 mi) southeast of Melenki (the district's administrative centre) by road. Domnino is the nearest rural locality.
