= Shahamir Shahamirian =

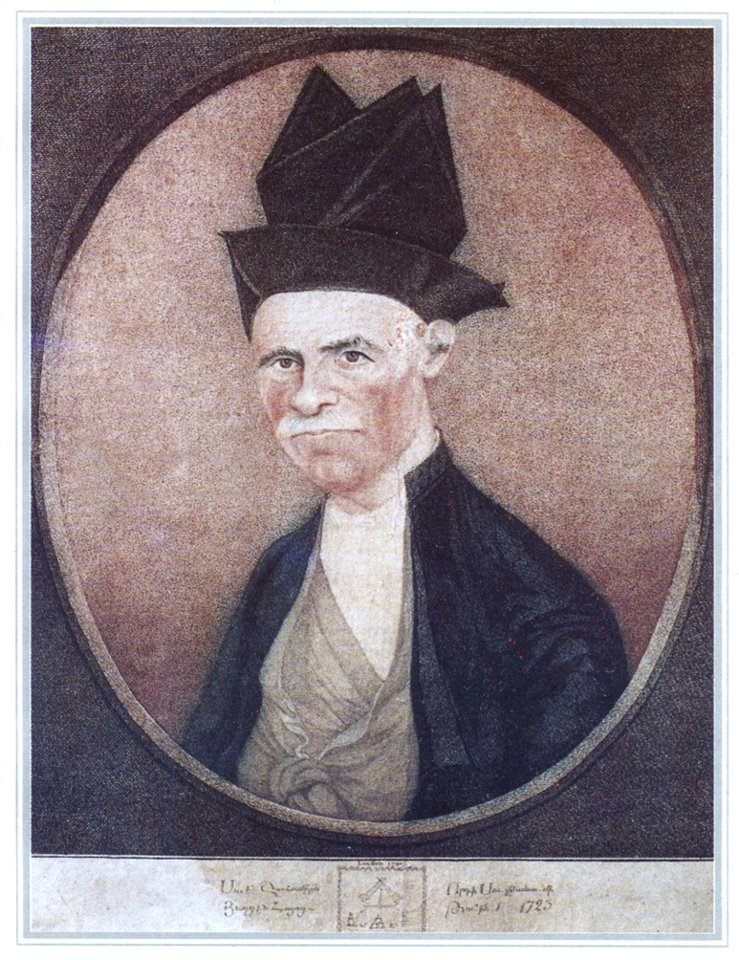
Portrait of Shahamir Shahamirian

Shahamir Shahamirian (Armenian: Շահամիր Շահամիրեան; (Note: Reformed orthography: Շահամիր Շահամիրյան) 1723–1797) was an 18th-century Armenian writer, philosopher, and wealthy merchant in Madras (modern-day Chennai, India). Born in New Julfa, Iran, he moved to India where he became an affluent merchant and an active member of the Armenian community of Madras. In 1771, Shahamirian and his collaborators founded the first Armenian printing press in Madras. In 1787/88, Shahamirian published Vorogayt Parats ("Snare of Glory," published under the name of his son Hakob Shahamirian), which contained a proposed constitution for a future independent Armenian republic. He is thus regarded as the author of the first Armenian constitution.

== Biography ==
Shahamir Shahamirian was born in 1723 in the Armenian-populated town of New Julfa in Iran. In the 1740s, he went to join his father Sultan David in Madras, India, which was already home to a prominent Armenian community. He became the wealthiest Armenian in Madras after inheriting his uncle's fortune.

One of Shahamirian's closest collaborators and sources of influence was Movses Baghramian. Shahamirian, his son Hakob, Movses Baghramian, Mikayel Khojajanian and other Armenians in Madras together formed what is known as the Madras group of Armenian intellectuals and founded a printing press there in 1771/72. The writings produced by the Madras group were the first Armenian works to express the ideals of the European Enlightenment. One of the first works published by the Madras printing press was Nor tetrak vor kochi hordorak ("New Booklet called Exhortation") by Hakob Shahamirian (or Movses Baghramian, according to some scholars), which preaches the new and revolutionary ideals of constitutional democracy. The work provided a political, rather than religious, explanation for the misfortunes of the Armenian nation and the loss of Armenian statehood and called on Armenians to engage in armed rebellion against their Ottoman and Persian overlords. Shahamir Shahamirian is best remembered today for authoring Girk anvanyal Vorogayt Parats (Armenian: Գիրք անուանեալ Որոգայթ Փառաց, "A Book called Snare of Glory"), which outlined the social, political and economic order for a future independent Armenian state. The proposed constitution in the work envisioned Armenia as a parliamentary republic with constitutionally guaranteed rights and duties for its citizens and separation of church and state. Article three of the proposed constitution reads:

Every human being, whether Armenian or of some other race, born in Armenia or having migrated there from another country, whether man or woman, shall live in equality and shall be free in all their affairs, and nobody shall have the right to rule over another person, and people's labor shall be paid for in accordance with the type of work performed, as laid down in Armenian legislation.

The title page of Vorogayt Parats dates it to 1773, but scholars have concluded that it must have been published later in 1787/88. Both Vorogayt Parats and Nor tetrak vor kochi hordorak were published under the name of Shahamir Shahamirian's son and collaborator Hakob (who died in 1774 in Malacca), but scholars now believe that Vorogayt Parats was authored primarily by Shahamir Shahamirian himself, although Hakob likely wrote the first theoretical section of the work. The issue of the authorship of Nor tetrak vor kochi hordorak is more controversial, with scholars disagreeing on whether it was written by Movses Baghramian or Hakob Shahamirian.

The activities of Shahamirian and the Madras group outraged Simeon I of Yerevan, the Armenian Catholicos in Ejmiatsin, who saw their liberal and secular ideas as a threat to the authority of the church and opposed the prospect of Armenians rebelling against Persian and Ottoman rule as too dangerous. In 1776, the Catholicos publicly condemned Movses Baghramian (who was excommunicated and forced into exile) and wrote an admonishing letter to Shahamirian ordering him to close down the Madras printing press and destroy the existing copies of Nor tetrak vor kochi hordorak, or else face excommunication. Shahamirian was forced to suppress the first part of Vorogayt Parats and send a manuscript copy of it to Simeon. The Madras group ceased its printing activities until Catholicos Simeon's death in 1780. In 1783, the Madras printing press published Shahamirian's Tetrak vor kochi nshavak ("Booklet of Aim"), which was a proposed communal constitution for the Armenian community of Madras along "republican" lines.

Shahamirian and his collaborators saw Heraclius II of Georgia and, later, the Russian Empire as potential vehicles for the liberation of Armenia from Muslim rule. For this reason, Shahamirian's proposed republican constitution specifies that a member of the old Armenian royal dynasties could be elected leader of the Armenian republic for life; Heraclius was a member of the Bagrationi dynasty, related to the Bagratunis that once reigned as kings of Armenia. Heraclius was in contact with Shahamirian and, responding to his overtures, awarded him the title of prince and granted him the region of Lori. Shahamirian saw Lori as a possible nucleus for the future Armenian republic that he and his allies envisioned. Shahamirian also established contacts with the Russian court and with Archbishop Hovsep Arghutian, the spiritual head of the Russian Armenians. He welcomed the Treaty of Georgievsk which made Georgia a protectorate of Russia, and drafted a proposal according to which an Armenian republic would be established following a Russian campaign in the South Caucasus.

Shahamirian died in 1797. He left his heirs 52 million gold francs and numerous properties, including factories and tobacco plantations in Malacca.

== Works ==
- Գիրք անուանեալ որոգայթ փառաց (Girk’ anvanyal vorogayt’ p’ar’ats’, "Snare of Glory") - 1773 (actually published in 1788-89)
- Տետրակ որ կոչի նշաւակ (Tetrak vor koch’i nshavak, "Booklet of Aim") - 1783

== See also ==
- Armenians in India
