= Pavel Chobanyan =

Armenian historian and orientalist (1948–2017)

- Պավել Աշոտի Չոբանյան
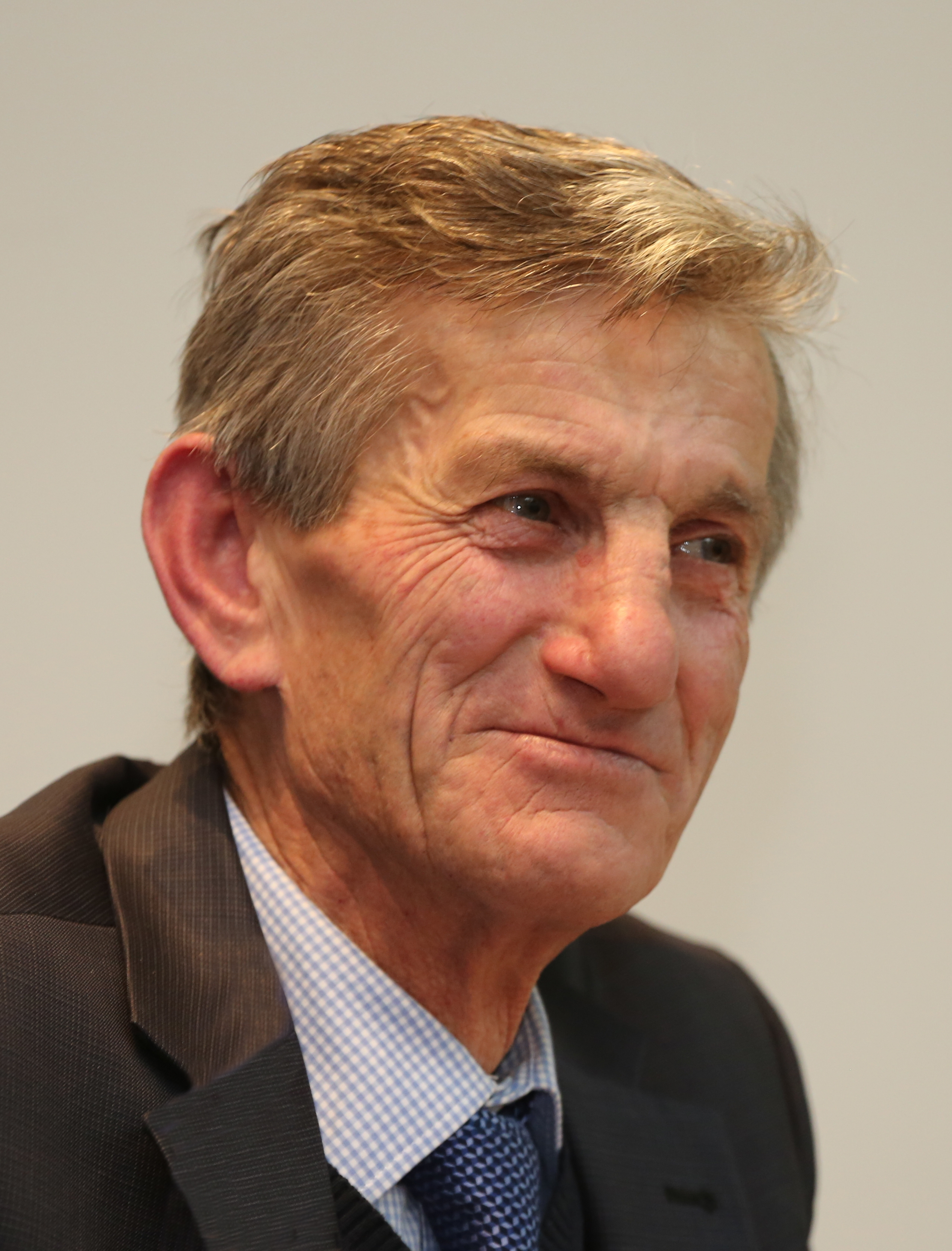
- Chobanyan in 2015
- Born: 15 March 1948; Khanlar, Goygol district, Azerbaijan SSR
- Died: 19 May 2017 (aged 69); Yerevan, Armenia
- Resting place: Yerevan, Armenia
- Occupations: Orientalist, Historian

Pavel Ashoti Chobanyan (Armenian: Պավել Աշոտի Չոբանյան, 15 March 1948 – 19 May 2017) was an Armenian historian.

== Biography ==
Pavel Chobanyan was born in the city of Khanlar (today called Goygol) in the Goygol District of the Azerbaijan SSR on March 15, 1948. His ancestors came from the village of Zaylik (Pip) in Dashkasan District. In 1973, he graduated with honors from the Department of Archeology, Ethnography and Source Studies of Yerevan State University.

From 1974 to 1976, Chobanyan undertook his PhD studies in Caucasian and Georgian Studies at the Institute of Oriental Studies of the National Academy of Sciences conducting his research at the Korneli Kekelidze Georgian National Center of Manuscripts under the supervision of the renowned Georgian studies specialist Yelena Metreveli, the head of the above-mentioned institute. In 1982, he successfully defended his dissertation titled “Armenians in the Middle East according to Georgian itineraries” and received the degree of Candidate of Sciences. In 2006, he defended his doctoral dissertation titled “Armenian-Russian-Georgian relationships in the second half of the 18th century”.

Chobanyan began his academic activity at the Institute of Oriental Studies of the Armenian National Academy of Sciences and due to his hard work he managed to become a Deputy Director of the Institute. From 1977 to 1985, he was a junior researcher of the Department of “Caucasian Byzantine Studies” and from 1995 to 1996 he was the Head of the Division “Christian Orient” at the same institute. From 1985 to 1995, he also worked at the Institute of History of NAS RA as a senior researcher. From 2002 to 2013, he was the scientific Deputy Director at the Institute of Oriental Studies of NAS RA. From 2013, till his last days Professor Chobanyan chaired Department of “Eastern Sources and Historiography” at the Institute of Oriental Studies of NAS RA.

He has been a member of several scientific and editorial boards for many years. From 1999 to 2003 he had been a deputy editor of Patma-Banasirakan Handes (Historical-Philological Journal). In those years under the consistent supervision of Academician Mkrtich Nersisyan, his goal-oriented and hard-working qualities contributed to the prosperity of Patma-Banasirakan Handes, which was very important in Armenian studies, as well as to the process of discovery and publication of ratifications of the Armenian-Russian relations.

From 2013, Pavel Chobanyan served as the editor-in-chief of the international scientific editorial board Journal of Armenian Studies. and edited eleven issues of the journal.

From 2007, as a Senior Analytical Scientist his knowledge was used at the National Defense Research University of the Ministry of Defense of Armenia. Pavel Chobanyan worked in different fields of Social Sciences. He was equally interested in Armenia’s political relations with Russia and countries in the Middle East, Armenian communities and their spiritual-cultural life, the history and bibliographic heritage of Georgia, the patterns of Armenian public life development, the contribution of Transcaucasian nations in the world history and many other issues that are reflected in his bibliography.

With the emergence of internal and external challenges connected with the newly established Republic of Armenia, there was a greater need for impartial and academically devoted researchers like Pavel Chobanyan. In 1991, he took part in the important socio-political processes of Post-Soviet era. He was included in the Pardon Committee under the RA President.

Chobanyan was also a member of the “Historian Association of Armenia” NGO.

== Academic activity ==
Chobanyan was the author of more than 150 academic publications, editor of about 20 academic articles. His academic researches were dedicated to the study of Armenian history, Armenian-Georgian and Armenian-Russian relations, Georgian travel notes.

Chobanyan translated and published A. Shanidze’s “Grammar of the ancient Georgian language” (jointly with H. Margaryan), which was very important step in the further development of Georgian studies in Armenia.

After collecting large number of sources from the archives and libraries of Tbilisi and Moscow, in 1981 he published his research titled “Georgian travel notes and their information about Armenians”. In 1990, the collection of documents titled “Armenian-Russian relationships in the second half of the 18th century (from 1760 to 1800)” was published, which was prepared with the participation of P. Chobanyan.

In 1999, Makar Barkhudaryan’s topographical works named “Artsakh” were republished with the introduction of P. Chobanyan.

Chobanyan’s academic interests were also linked with the history of Armenian communities of India, Italy and Jerusalem. He discovered and published new ratifications of 17th-18th centuries about the history of Armenia, the Armenian Church and Artsakh.

In 2006, Chobanyan’s monograph titled “Armenian-Russian-Georgian relationships in the second half of the 18th century” was published.

The skilled historian-medievalist was one of the authors of the four-volume book “History of Neighboring Countries of Armenia”, which was published by the Institute of Oriental Studies of NAS RA. He had been not only a member of the editorial board but also the responsible editor for the publication of the second volume.

In the new schoolbooks and textbooks “Armenian History” and “History of Neighboring Countries of Armenia” he authored about some issues of the history of late medieval Armenia and Eastern Transcaucasia.

His “The Phenomenon of Shushi” (2013) and “Artsakh. Demographic and Localization Issues in the context of NKR Security” (2014) are collective monographs that were published as an appendix of “Armenian Army” military journal in the special editions of “Working Notebooks” under the RA MoD National Defense Research University, where he had been as a project coordinator, academic editor and author of the major articles.

During his academic activity Chobanyan's speech was heard in many international and local conferences, where he covered the most important issues of Source Studies and the history of Transcaucasia. He took part in Livorno, Saint-Petersburg, Ashkhabad, Tbilisi, Stepanakert, Montpellier and many other academic conferences on Armenian and Oriental Studies.

== Pedagogical activity ==
Professor Chobanyan had also been engaged in pedagogical activities. He taught at David Anhaght University, Armenian State Pedagogical University after Khachatur Abovyan (from 1995 to 2008), Yerevan State University and Yerevan School of Mekhitarist Congregation.

He had prepared numerous experts in the fields of Medieval Studies, Armenology, Georgian and Caucasian Studies, who continue his legacy in universities and academic institutions Under the supervision of P. Chobanyan more than ten Candidate dissertations from Georgia, Iran, Russia and many other countries were defended. He had also been an opponent of many Candidate and Doctoral dissertations.

P. Chobanyan was both member and scientific secretary of the Specialized Council 056 of “Political Science and International Relations” at the National Defense Research University, MoD, RA. Under his supervision more than 90 Candidate and Doctoral dissertations were defended.

== Bibliography ==
- Ազատ Բոզոյան, Խոսք հայագետ-կովկասագետի հիշատակին,- «Էջմիածին», 2017, Մայիս, էջ 158-170։ (in Armenian)
- Ազատ Բոզոյան, Պավել Չոբանյանի հիշատակին. Պ. Ա. Չոբանյանի գիտական աշխատությունների մատենագիտություն ,- «Բանբեր հայագիտության», 2017, 1, էջ 222-235։ (in Armenian)

== Sources ==
- Ով ով է հայեր. Կենսագրական հանրագիտարան, հտ. 2, Երևան, Հայկական հանրագիտարան. հրատարակչություն, 2007, էջ 292: (in Armenian)
- «ԵՊՀ Պատմության ֆակուլտետի շրջանավարտներ», Երևան, 2009: (in Armenian)
