= Ghukas Karnetsi =

Armenian religious leader (1722–1799)

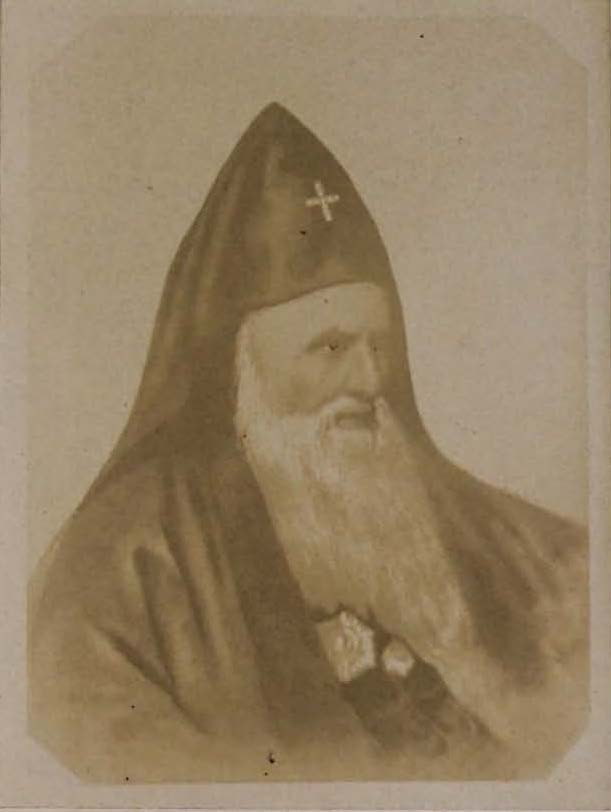
Portrait of Ghukas Karnetsi

Ghukas Karnetsi (Armenian: Ղուկաս Կարնեցի, lit. 'Luke of Karin/Erzurum'; 1722 – 28 December 1799) was Catholicos of All Armenians (head of the Armenian Church) in Etchmiadzin from 1780 to 1799. He succeeded his former teacher Simeon of Yerevan and continued many of his policies. He was catholicos during a time of economic hardship and conflict in Iranian Armenia and appealed to the Russian Empire to take Armenians under its protection. He was careful not to worsen the church's relations with Muslim rulers. He was also responsible for the renovation and decoration of Etchmiadzin Cathedral.

== Biography ==
Ghukas was born in 1722 in Kiğı in the Erzurum Eyalet of the Ottoman Empire. At the monastic school in Etchmiadzin, he was a student of future catholicos Simeon (r. 1763–1780). He was ordained a priest in 1751 and sent to the diocese of Rumelia as a legate (nvirak) of the catholicos. (Note: At the time, the diocese of Rumelia encompassed the Armenian communities of Wallachia, Moldavia, Bulgaria and Crimea.) In 1763, he was consecrated as a bishop and appointed prelate of the Armenians of Izmir. When his term as legate ended, his parishioners wrote to Catholicos Simeon asking him to allow Ghukas to remain in Izmir; Simeon agreed. In 1775, Ghukas returned to Etchmiadzin. Catholicos Simeon designated Ghukas as his successor, and he was elected catholicos after Simeon's death in 1780. As a result of the wartime conditions created by Georgian king Heraclius II's campaign against the Khan of Erivan, Ghukas's election was not preceded by the traditional consultation with the Armenians of Constantinople, who initially refused to accept him. However, the new Armenian patriarch of Constantinople recognized Ghukas as the head of the Armenian Church a year later.

Ghukas became catholicos during a difficult time in Eastern Armenia, characterized by economic hardship and conflict between local rulers in the absence of central authority. In 1782, Ghukas appealed to the Russian military command to free the Armenian people from Iranian rule. Ghukas undertook building projects, renovating Etchmiadzin Cathedral. In 1786, he hired painter Hovnatan Hovnatanian to decorate the walls of the cathedral. In 1797, Ghukas appealed to Tsar Paul I of Russia to take the Armenian people under his protection and recognize the spiritual authority of the Mother See of Holy Etchmiadzin over the Armenians living in the Russian Empire. Paul carried out Ghukas's request with a decree issued on 26 February 1798. A cautious leader, Ghukas managed to maintain good relations with the Ottomans and Iranians despite his overtures to Russia.

Ghukas divided some of his power by creating a permanent council of bishops to assist the catholicos, which, according to historian George Bournoutian, contributed to later factionalism within the church. His death was followed by significant interest by Iran and Russia in Etchmiadzin's affairs. Archbishop Hovsep Arghutian, who was elected as Ghukas's successor with Russian support, died before being consecrated. Ghukas was succeeded by Davit V Enegetsi as catholicos.

== Notes ==
Preceded by Simeon I of Yerevan	Catholicos of the Holy See of St. Echmiadzin and All Armenians; 1780–1799	Succeeded by Davit V
