= Joseph Emin =

Armenian traveler and writer (1726–1809)

Joseph Emin Յովսէփ Էմին
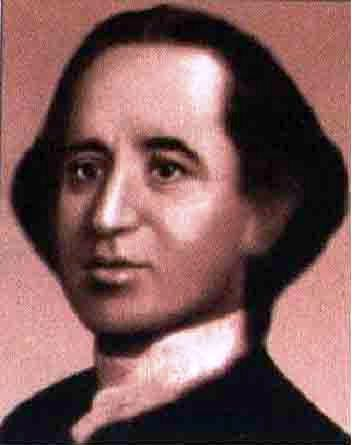
- Born: 1726; Hamadan, Iran
- Died: 2 August 1809 (aged 82–83); Calcutta, India
- Resting place: Calcutta, India
- Other name: Hoseph
- Spouse: Thangoom-Khatoon Emin
- Children: Arshak, Joseph
- Parent(s): Joseph, (Mother's name unknown)

Emin Joseph Emin (Armenian: Յովսէփ Էմին, Hovsep Emin; 1726 – 2 August 1809) was an Indo-Armenian traveler, writer and patriot who sought to achieve the liberation of Armenia from Persian and Ottoman rule. He wrote an autobiography titled The Life and Adventures of Joseph Emin the Armenian Written in English by Himself, which was first published in London in 1792.

Born in Hamadan and raised in Calcutta, he traveled to London as a young man, received a military education there, and fought in the Seven Years' War. In 1759-1760, he traveled to Armenia for the first time, preaching his ideas of liberation to Armenian villagers along the way. He then went to Russia to seek support for his program for the liberation of Armenia. In 1763 he left Russia for Georgia with a group of supporters and was received by the Georgian king Heraclius II. Emin established contacts in Ottoman Armenia, hoping to eventually raise a rebellion with Heraclius's support. However, in 1764 the Georgian king exiled Emin, who then unsuccessfully attempted to gather support for his plans among the Armenian meliks (princes) of Karabakh. Emin eventually returned to India, where he became a close collaborator of the Armenia writer Shahamir Shahamirian. From 1777 to 1783, Emin lived New Julfa, Iran and unsuccessfully tried to return to Armenia and resume his revolutionary activities. He returned to India for the last time in 1783 and spent the rest of his life there.

Emin espoused the ideas of the European Enlightenment and sought to spread these to his compatriots. Although he was criticized and persecuted by the Armenian clerical elite for his ideals and activities, he is celebrated by Armenians today as a national hero and a pioneer of the Armenian national liberation movement. He has been described as the first Asian to travel from India to Britain and to write an account of his travels in a European language.

== Early life ==
Emin was born in Hamadan, Persia in 1726 to the family of an Armenian merchant named Joseph (Hovsep). Like most Armenians in Iran, he was descended from Armenians that had been forcibly resettled in that country by Shah Abbas I in the early 17th century. Emin was born at a time when Iran was in turmoil as a result of the Afghan occupation of Isfahan and the fall of the Safavid dynasty. In the early 1730s, Emin's family moved to Baghdad, where his mother and younger brother died during the siege of the city in 1733 by Tahmasp Qoli Khan, the future Nader Shah. Emin was sent back to Hamadan by his grandfather, where he was soon joined by his father. As a child Emin had witnessed firsthand the troubles of his family and other Christians at the hands of local Muslim officials. Forced to leave Hamadan due to the abuses of the authorities there, Emin's father left for India, leaving his son in Iran. In 1744 Emin and his grandfather moved to India to join his father Joseph in Calcutta. Emin attended St. Anne's Charity School in Calcutta (now the site of St. Andrew's Church in B. B. D. Bagh), where he learned English. As a young man, not unlike Israel Ori before him, Emin resolved to dedicate his life to the liberation of Armenia. When he came into contact with the British military in Calcutta, he realized that the Armenians needed both education and skill in the contemporary Western art of warfare if they hoped to regain independence.

== Life in England ==
In 1751, against his father's wishes, Emin left for London. His first four years there were filled with misery and hard labour, and he was deprived of any financial assistance from his father. However, in 1755 Emin experienced a turning point in his life. He met and befriended Edmund Burke, the future British statesman and political writer, with whose support he gained access to the circles of British intellectuals and nobility. He received sponsorship from Hugh Percy the Duke of Northumberland and was admitted to the Royal Military Academy in Woolwich, where he remained for thirteenth months after which he enlisted as a volunteer in the British and Prussian armies during their war against France in order to gain practical experience.

== Efforts to liberate Armenia ==
Emin left London in 1759 and traveled to Echmiadzin, passing through the Armenian areas of the Ottoman Empire on his way. His initial strategy for liberating Armenia involved attempting to motivate the Catholicos of Echmiadzin (then Simeon I of Yerevan) toward the idea of first liberating Ottoman Armenia and then Persian Armenia and then proceeding to secure the cooperation of the Armenian meliks of Karabagh and King Heraclius II of Georgia, who, after the death of Nader Shah, had liberated his country from the Persian yoke and reestablished the Georgian Kingdom. However, Emin was disappointed with the ignorance of the Armenian clergy and the passive and apathetic leadership. He decided to return to London to pursue other avenues for his liberation plans.

Emin returned to England in early 1761 from where he secured passage to Russia from Prince Golitsyn, the Russian Ambassador to England. In Saint Petersburg he met with the Russian imperial chancellor Count Vorontsov, to whom he presented his plans to go to Georgia, enter the service of King Heraclius II, and help liberate Armenia. Emin entered Tiflis (now Tbilisi) in 1763 with a letter of recommendation from Count Voronstov to King Heraclius II and accompanied by a large group of Armenian volunteers who had joined him from Armenian settlements in the North Caucasus. In Tiflis, Emin stressed to the king the historical links between the Armenian and Georgian peoples and the monarch's legitimate rights to extend his rule over his ancestral lands (see Origin of the Bagratid dynasties), assuring him that a small but disciplined army could easily cross over into Armenia, where a general revolt against Persian and Ottoman rule would take place. Tens of thousands of volunteer fighters, mostly gathered by Hovhan, the head of the religious order of St. Karapet Monastery in Moush, Western Armenia, would assist him in defeating the Muslim forces, allowing the establishment of a joint Kingdom of Armenia and Georgia. While King Heraclius initially showed some interest in Emin's plans, he eventually saw Emin as a challenger and a few months after his arrival in Tiflis Emin was forced to leave Georgia and cross into the Northern Caucasus. Emin remained in the region for the following five years, spending a lot of time among the mountain tribes, with whose assistance he was finally able to reach Karabagh and the mountainous Zangezur region in Armenia where he tried to pursue his liberation plans with the local Armenian nobles and the Armenian Bishop of Gandzasar. Realizing he needed the help of the Georgian king for any hope of success, he returned briefly to Georgia again only to be ordered to leave.

== Return to India ==
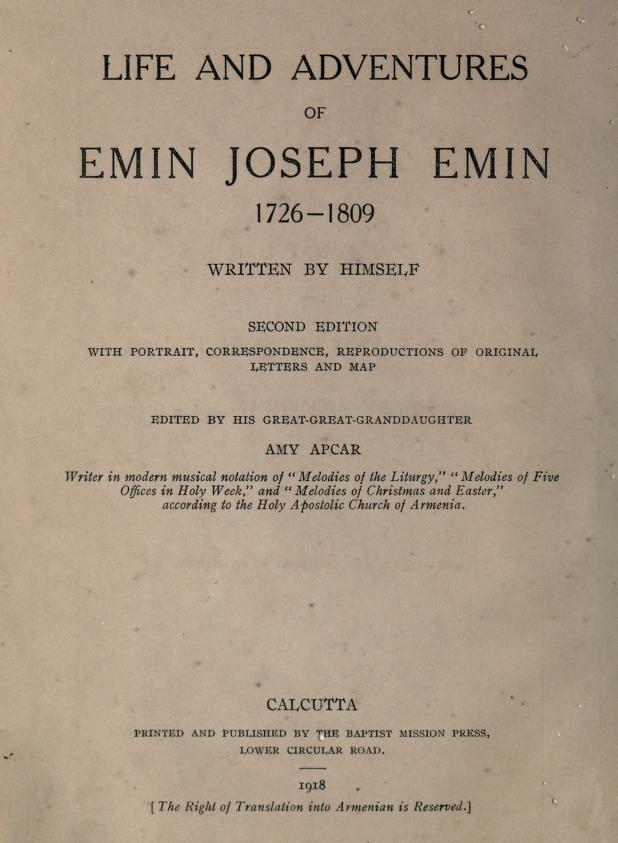
The second edition (1918) of The Life and Adventures of Joseph Emin, published by his great-granddaughter, Amy Apcar, in Calcutta, India.

After his second failed attempt to persuade King Heraclius, Emin left Georgia, and passing through Armenia and Persia, returned to India in 1770, where he tried to secure financial support from Armenian merchants to go back to Armenia to maintain a 'few troops' there. But facing clerical opposition again, he failed. Bitterly disillusioned, he rejoined the British Army under Warren Hastings. Emin remained in India for the rest of his life, and devoted his time and energy to keeping the idea of the liberation of Armenia alive. Emin wrote his memoirs where he described all his numerous and dangerous adventures. The book was entitled The Life and Adventures of Joseph Emin the Armenian Written in English by Himself, and was first published in London in 1792. A second edition was prepared and published in Calcutta in 1918 by Emin's great-great-granddaughter who added all the preserved letters written by Emin in English.

== Descendants and heritage ==
Emin's book (The Life and Adventures of Joseph Emin) was revised by his great-great-granddaughter Amy Apcar who added many letters and documents letters written by Emin. He also has descendants living in Calcutta, Russia, and London. Emin was also a descendant of Emin the First (or Emin the Great), who is thought to have held a position of considerable power in Armenia during the early 1500s. None of Emin's remaining descendants have retained the name 'Emin', and thus it has been lost.

== Bibliography ==
- Aslanian, Sebouh D. (2012). "A Reader Responds to Joseph Emin's Life and Adventures: Notes toward a "History of Reading" in Late Eighteenth Century Madras". Handes Amsorya (1–12): 363–418.
- Emin, Emin Joseph (1918). Apcar, Amy (ed.). Life and Adventures of Emin Joseph Emin, 1726–1809 (PDF) (Second ed.). Calcutta: Baptist Mission Press.
- Fisher, Michael H. (2004). Counterflows to Colonialism: Indian Travellers and Settlers in Britain, 1600–1857. Delhi: Permanent Black. ISBN 81-7824-077-7.
- Hovhannisyan, A. (1978). "Ēmin Hovsepʻ". In Simonyan, Abel (ed.). Haykakan sovetakan hanragitaran [Armenian Soviet Encyclopedia] (in Armenian). Vol. 4. Erevan: AE Publishing House. pp. 45.
- Ioannisi︠a︡n, A. R. (1989). Iosif Ėmin (in Russian). Erevan: Izd-vo AN Armi︠a︡nskoĭ SSR.
