= Kusanats Anapat =

Monastery in Azerbaijan

- Կուսանաց անապատ
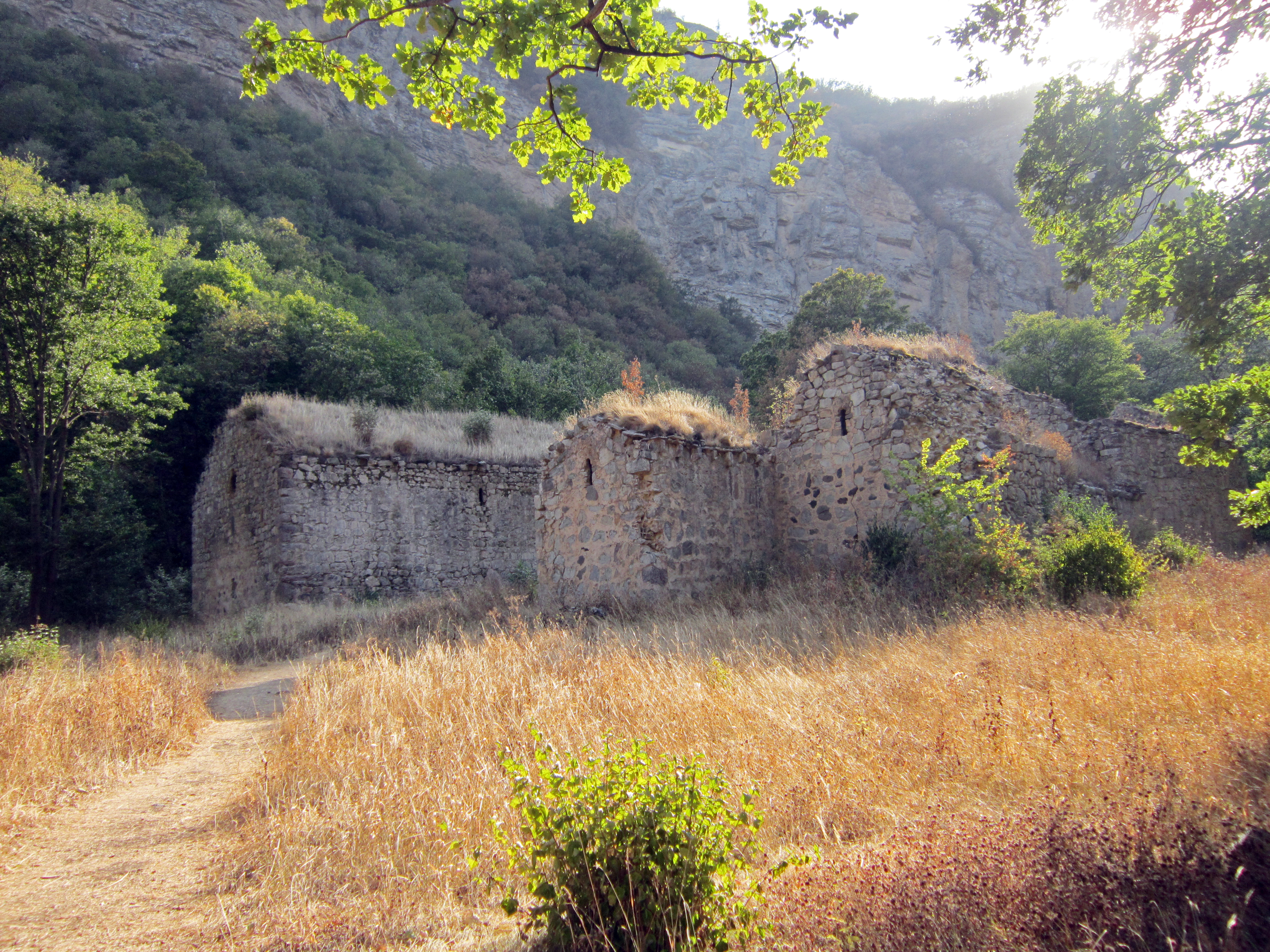

- Location within Azerbaijan Location within East Zangezur Economic Region

Religion
- Affiliation: Armenian Apostolic Church

Location
- Location: Kalbajar District, Azerbaijan
- Interactive map of Kusanats Anapat
- Coordinates: 40.171069°N 46.258621°E

Architecture
- Type: Monastery, Church
- Style: Armenian
- Completed: 12th–13th centuries

Kusanats Anapat (Armenian: Կուսանաց անապատ), or Surb Astvatsatsin (Armenian: Սուրբ Աստվածածին, lit. 'Holy Mother of God') is an Armenian monastery in the Kalbajar District in Azerbaijan, about 3 km northwest of Dadivank Monastery.

== History and architecture ==
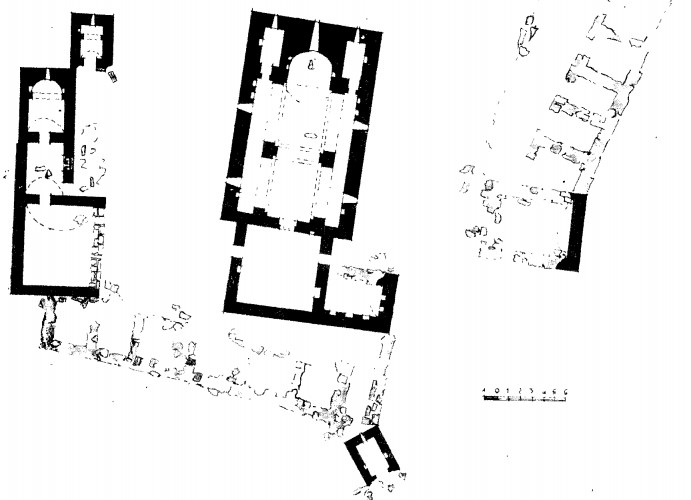
Plan of Kusants Anapat

The monastery belongs to the Artsakh Diocese of the Armenian Apostolic Church, and consists of the cathedral church of Surb Astvatsatsin and about 20 structures and rooms.

The oldest building is the church of Surb Astvatsatsin (Holy Mother of God), which has the inscription; "… princess daughter of King Kyurike… in 1174".

=== Modern period ===
According to historian Samvel Karapetyan, in front of the small eastern church, until 1989, two khachkars were placed side by side in their original place. While part of the Azerbaijani SSR, the monument suffered a lot, and an attempt was made to eliminate Armenian traces in order to present it as Caucasian Albanian. These khachkars had disappeared by the time Armenian forces took control of the region in April 1993, but the inscriptions made on them had been recorded.։

In 1994, following the end of the First Nagorno-Karabakh War, the monastery came under the control of the self-proclaimed Republic of Artsakh.

In the aftermath of the Nagorno-Karabakh war in 2020, which resulted in a ceasefire agreement stipulating an Armenian withdrawal from Kalbajar and a return of the surrounding area to Azerbaijan, the monastery was included in the territory to come under Azerbaijani control.

== Gallery ==
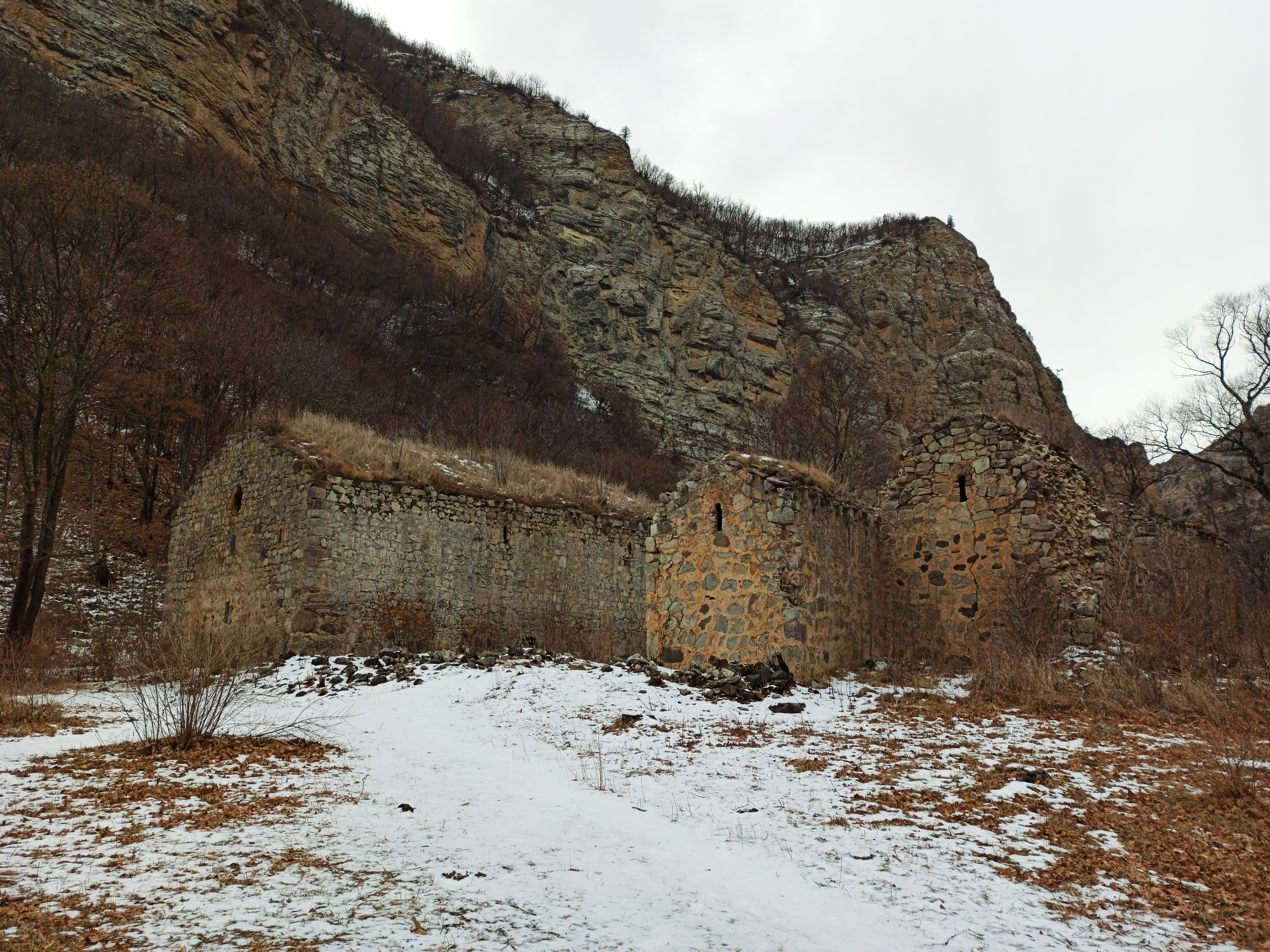

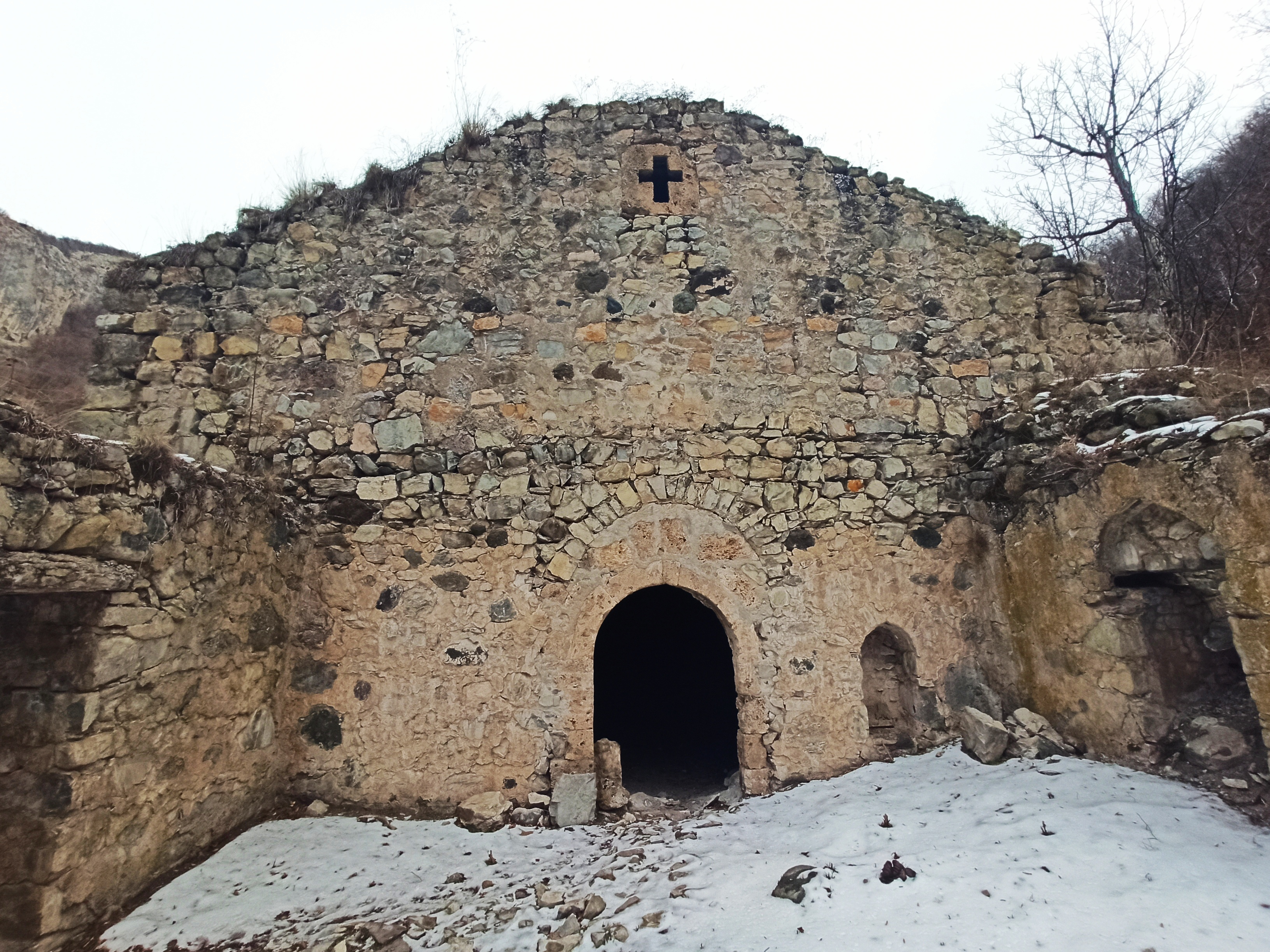

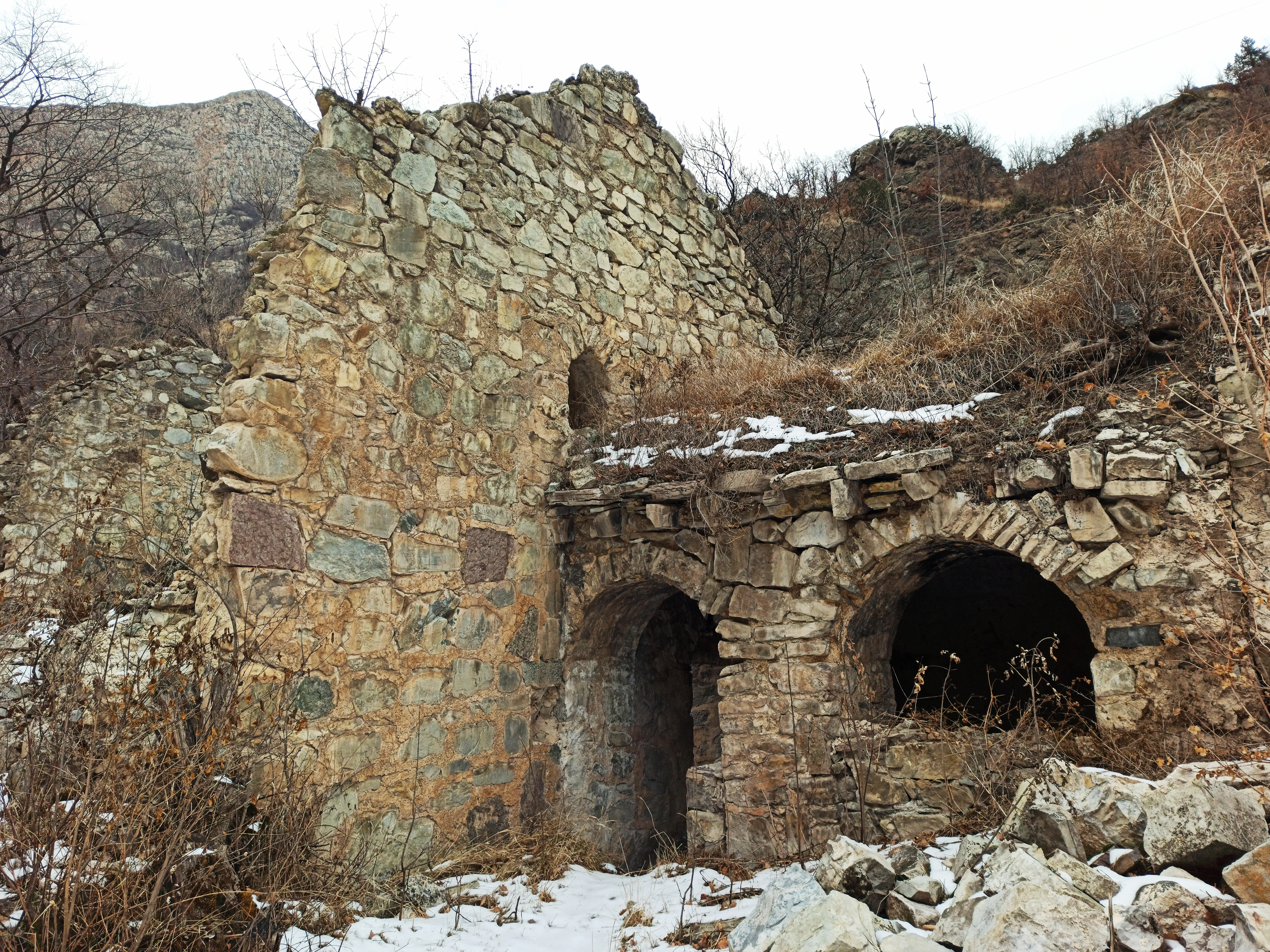

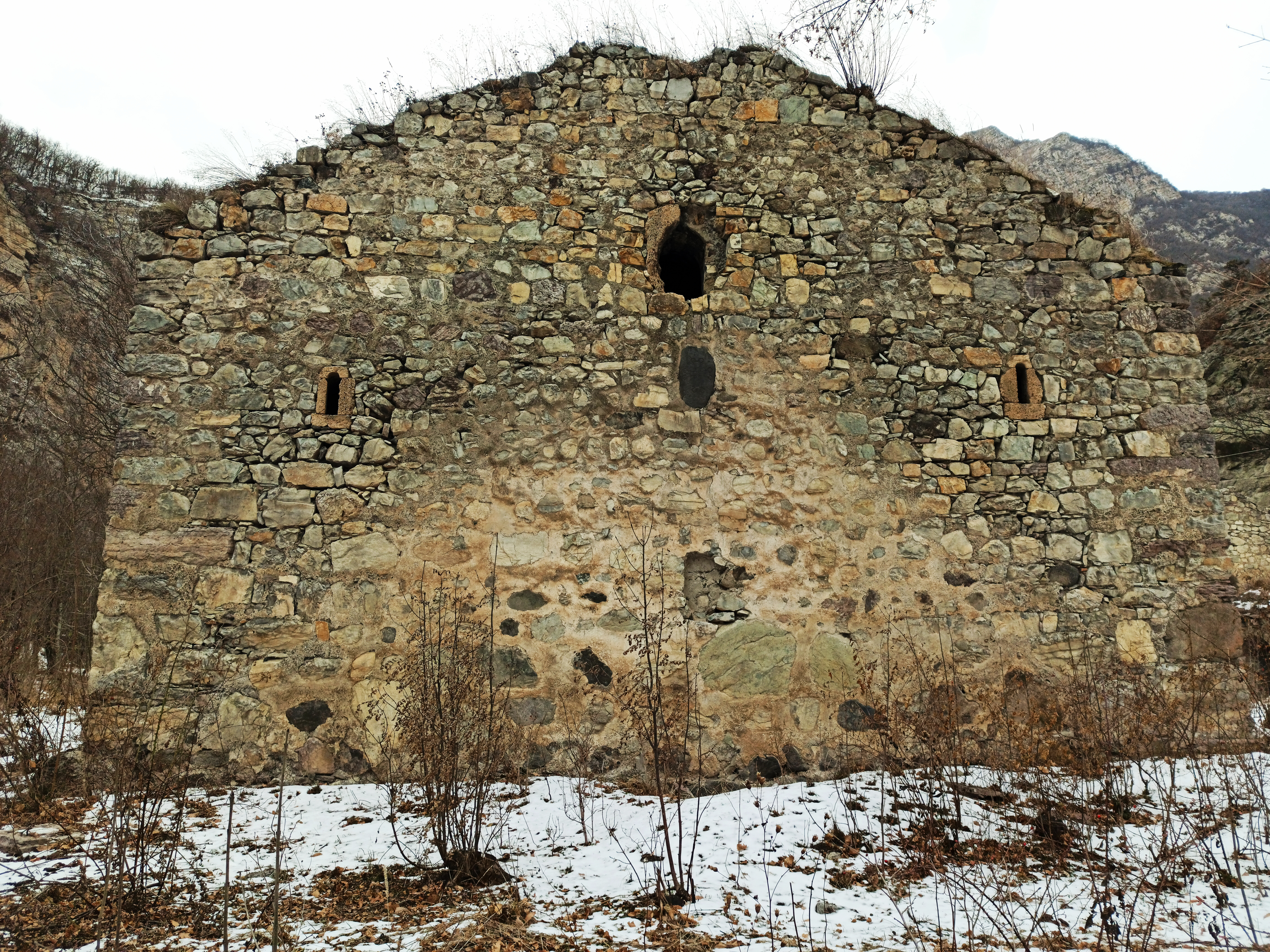

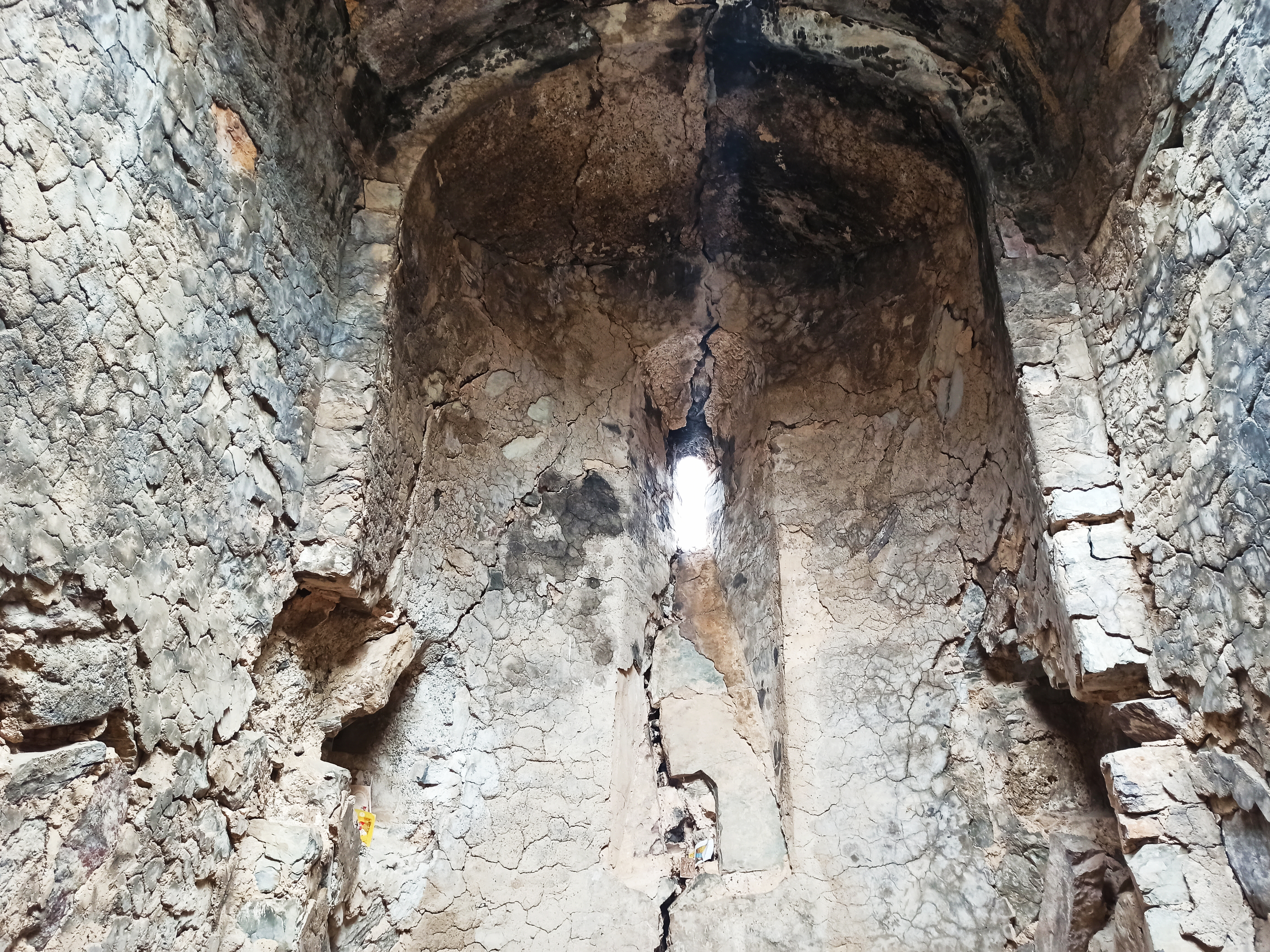

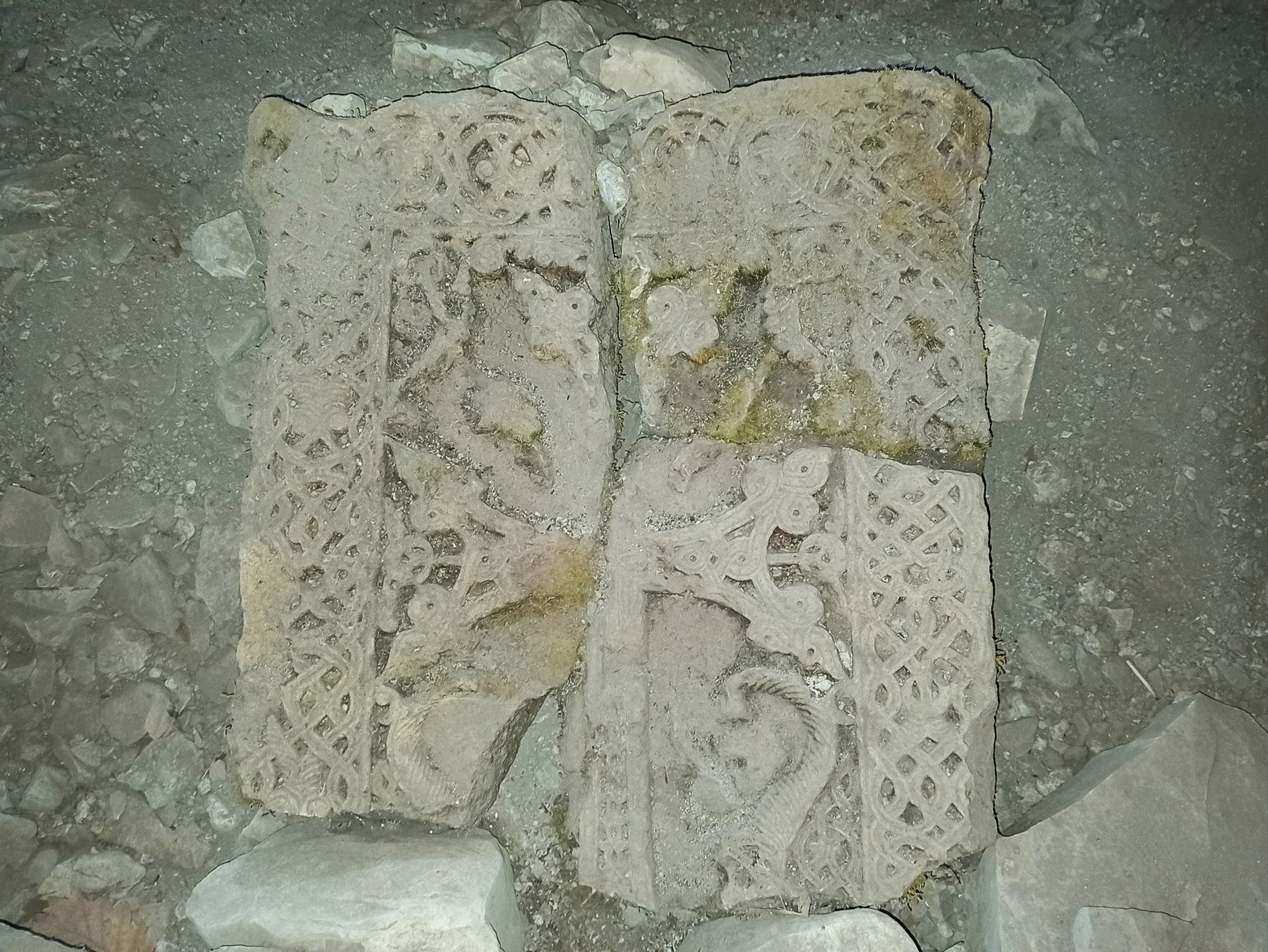

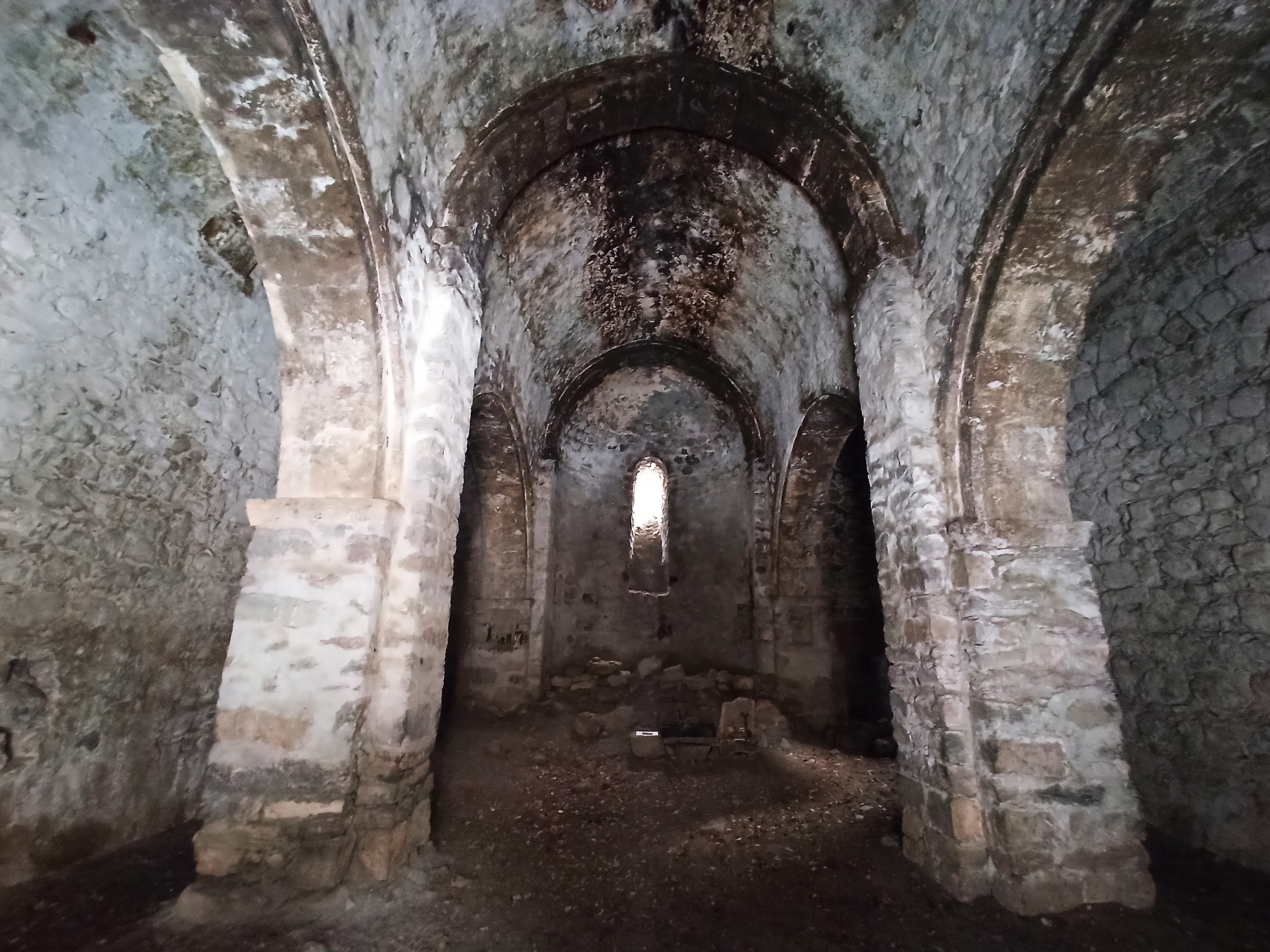

== See also ==
- Armenian architecture
- Armenian Cultural Heritage in Azerbaijan
- Christianity in Azerbaijan
- Culture of Artsakh
