= Vank =

Vank or VANK may refer to:

- VANK, the Voluntary Agency Network of Korea, a South Korean Internet-based organization
- Nederlandsche Vereeniging voor Ambachts- en Nijverheidskunst (VANK)
- Vank (վանք), the Armenian language word for monastery. By extension:
  - Vank, Armenia, a town
  - Vank, Martakert, a village in Nagorno-Karabakh
  - Vank Cathedral, an Armenian cathedral in Isfahan, Iran
- Banku (call to prayer), the Muslim call to public prayer on the Malabar Coast.

== See also ==
- Vang (disambiguation)
- Vəng (disambiguation), several places in Azerbaijan
- Wank (disambiguation)
