= Vank, Azerbaijan =

Vank, Azerbaijan may refer to:

- Vəng (disambiguation), several places in Azerbaijan
- Vəngli, Azerbaijan
