= Vanku =

Vanku or Vaanku may refer to:

- Vanku, a fictional sage from the Sanskrit poem Nava-sahasanka-charita
- Banku (call to prayer), the Muslim call to public prayer in the Malabar region
- "Vaanku", a short story by Unni R.
  - Vaanku (film), a 2021 Malayalam film based on the story

== See also ==
- Vank (disambiguation)
- Banku (disambiguation)
