= Vang =

Vang may refer to:

== People ==
Vang is a common surname among Hmong Americans, including

- Vang Pao (1929–2011), Lieutenant General in the Royal Lao Army and a leader of the Hmong American community in the United States
- Ka Vang (born 1975), writer
- Chai Vang (born 1968), convicted murderer
- Bee Vang (born 1991), actor, best known as Thao Vang Lor in Gran Torino
- Katie Ka Vang, artist, playwright
- Bora Vang (born 1987), Chinese-born Turkish table tennis player
- Lexus Vang (born 2005), singer, dancer, rapper and better known as Lexi of girl group Girlset
- Ruth Vang (born 1966), Faroese politician
- Mai Vang (born 1985), American politician

== Places ==
- Vang, Bornholm, a village on the island of Bornholm, Denmark
- Vang Municipality, a municipality in Innlandet county, Norway
  - Vang i Valdres, a village in Vang Municipality in Innlandet county, Norway
- Vang Municipality (Hedmark), a former municipality in the old Hedmark county, Norway
- Vang, a village in Ka Choun, Cambodia
- Vəng (disambiguation), a list of similarly-named places in Azerbaijan

== Other ==
- Vang (spritsail), a sailing part
- Boom vang, a sailing part
- Gaff vang, a sailing part
- D-alanine—D-serine ligase, an enzyme
