= Banku =

Banku may refer to:

- Banku (dish)
- Banku (call to prayer)
- Banku, a character in the 2008 Hindi-language film Bhoothnath

== See also ==
- Bank (disambiguation)
- Vanku (disambiguation)
