= Culture of Artsakh =

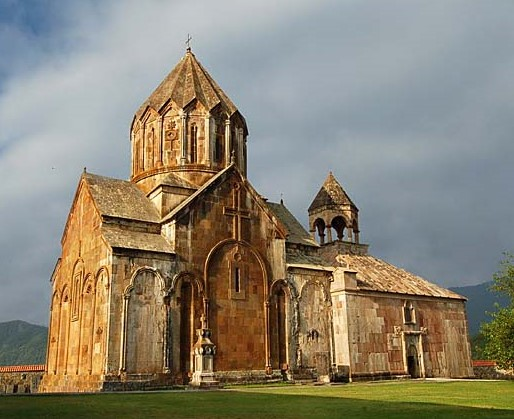
Gandzasar Monastery (1216–1238)

Culture of Artsakh (Nagorno-Karabakh) includes artifacts of tangible and intangible culture that has been historically associated with Artsakh (historic province) in the Southern Caucasus, now controlled by Azerbaijan. These include monuments of religious and civil architecture, memorial and defense structures, and various forms of art. In territory, there are around 500 historical sites with about 6000 Armenian monuments.

== General information ==
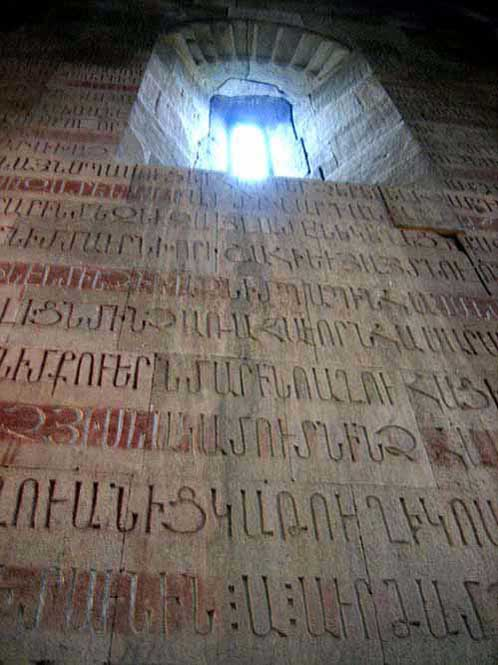
Armenian-inscribed text, Gandzasar Monastery (1216–1238)

Nagorno Karabakh and adjacent territories belonging to historical Artsakh (some of which fell under the Republic of Artsakh's control in 1992–1994) has been called an open-sky treasure-house of various forms of Armenian architecture. Overall, Nagorno-Karabakh hosts several thousand architectural artifacts and historical monuments in a larger sense. In addition to ecclesiastical structures, this number includes samples of civil architecture, ancient castles and fortresses as well as numerous khachkars.

The art and architecture created in Nagorno Karabakh has progressed through the same major stages as did Armenian art in a larger sense. They began developing in the pre-Christian times, proceeded through the adoption of Christianity early in the fourth century, and entered the era of modernity after blossoming in the Middle Ages.

The principal expression of Artsakh's art in the Middle Ages was through ecclesiastical architecture: churches, cathedrals, chapels and monasteries. Most other forms of art in that period, including illuminated manuscripts, khachkars (Armenian: խաչքար; unique-to-Armenia stone slabs with engraved crosses) and mural paintings were likewise tied to Artsakh's religious life and its primary institution—the Armenian Apostolic Church.

Works of architecture in Nagorno-Karabakh are constructed according to similar principles and with the use of the same techniques as those in the rest of Armenia. Limestone is the principal building materials that form the nucleus for the walls. They are then covered with facing and/or plated with volcanic tuff rock slabs.

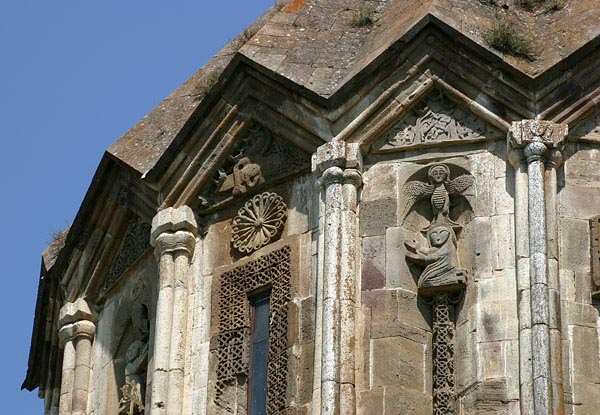
Relief sculptures on the dome of the Cathedral of St. John the Baptist of the Gandzasar Monastery (1216–1238)

In large buildings in cities or in monasteries the exterior facing can consist of carefully cut blocks of tuff. The monasteries of Gandzasar and Dadivank serve as the primary examples of that style. For more modest structures, such as parish churches in provinces, it was common to use less carefully cut stone, a practice which creates a more rustic appearance.

Names of monasteries in Nagorno Karabakh, like in the rest of historical Artsakh and Armenia, customarily include the term "vank" (Armenian: վանք), which means "monastery." Examples: Dadivank, Gtichavank, Khunisavank, Khadavank, Khatravank, Yerits Mankants Vank, etc. Monasteries are often located in or near settlements that bear the name Vank (Վանք); the most notable cases include Dadivank Monastery, Gandzasar Monastery and Spitak Khach Vank Monastery. Names of castles and fortresses in Nagorno Karabakh like in the rest of historical Artsakh and Armenia, customarily include the term "berd" (Armenian: բերդ) which means "fort." Examples: Jraberd, Handaberd, Mairaberd, Khokhanaberd, etc.

== Historical monuments of the pre-Christian era ==
The earliest monuments in Artsakh relate to the pre-Christian era when polytheism was the most widespread form of religion. The most curious art form from that time period is, perhaps, large anthropomorphic stone idols that are found in the eastern lowlands of the northern counties of Jraberd (Armenian: Ջրաբերդ) and Khachen (Armenian: Խաչեն). They date from the Iron Age.

In the northeastern outskirts of the Republic of Artsakh, and further to the east, so-called sahmanakars (Armenian: սահմանաքար, meaning "border stones") are found. They originally appeared during the reign of the Artashessian (Artaxiad) royal dynasty in Armenia (190 BC-53 AD) who used the stones, with inscriptions, to demarcate the kingdom's frontiers for travelers. In Artsakh, the tradition of marking borders with sahmanakars endured throughout the Middle Ages. The largest of such medieval markers stands near the town of Mataghes (Armenian: Մատաղես) in the Mardakert District. An inscription on the stone declares: "Here [the province of] Syunik ends."

== Monasteries, churches and chapels in and around Artsakh ==
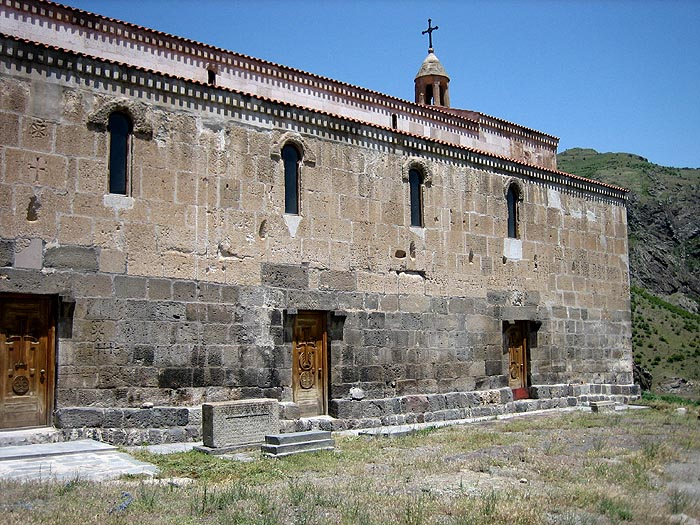
Tzitzernavank Monastery (4th century) after restoration

In the early Middle Ages, Artsakh and neighboring provinces of Utik and Paytakaran, known together as The Eastern Prefectures of Armenia (Armenian: Կողմանք Արևելից Հայոց) became a target of missionary activities of prominent religious leaders from Armenian mainland. The most distinguished of them were St. Gregory the Illuminator (Armenian: Սբ. Գրիգոր Լուսավորիչ, died circa 337 AD), who baptized Armenia into the first Christian state in 301 AD, and St. Mesrob Mashtots (Armenian: Սբ. Մեսրոբ Մաշտոց, 361–440 AD), the scholar who created the Armenian alphabet.

A number of Christian monuments that are identified with that vital period of the Armenian history belong to the world's oldest places of Christian worship. Among them is the Amaras Monastery (Armenian: Ամարասի Վանք), which, according to ancient authors, such as the forefather of Armenian history Movses Khorenatsi (approx.410–490), was founded in the 4th century AD by St. Gregory himself. The oldest part of the monastery is the martyrium of St. Grigoris (Armenian: Սբ. Գրիգորիս), St. Gregory's grandson and Bishop of Aghvank, who was killed by the pagans, around 338 AD, when teaching Gospel in the land of the Mazkuts (present-day Republic of Dagestan, in Russia). The mausoleum of St. Grigoris is a vaulted burial chamber equipped with two lateral vestibules that serves as the crypt for a church dating from a later period. Amaras is an active monastery of the Armenian Apostolic Church.

While traveling in Artsakh and the neighboring provinces of Syunik and Utik, in circa 410 AD, St. Mesrob Mashtots established a school at Amaras where the Armenian script, invented by him in 405 AD, was first introduced for teaching purposes.

For 35 years until his death in 440, Mashtots recruited teams of monks to translate the religious, scientific and literary masterpieces of the ancient world into this new alphabet. Much of their work was conducted in the monastery at Amaras ..."

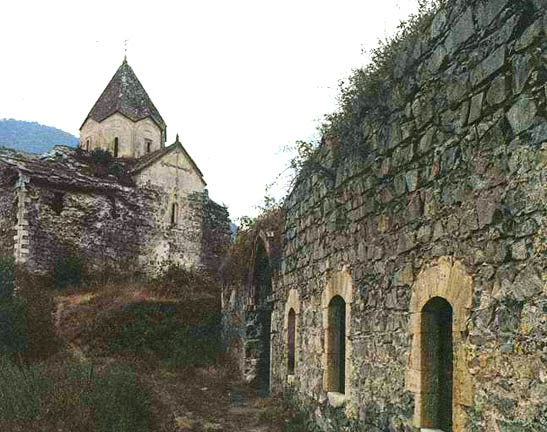
Yerits Mankants Abbey (built around 1691)

The description of St. Mesrob Mashtots' journey to Artsakh and the neighboring province of Utik is a focal point of several chapters of the "History of Aghvank" (Armenian: Պատմություն Աղվանից) written in the 7th century by one of Artsakh's most prominent natives—Armenian historian Movses Kaghankatvatsi (Armenian: Մովսես Կաղանկատվացի).

Another temple whose history relates to the mission of St. Mesrob Mashtots is the Targmanchats Monastery (Armenian: Սբ. Թարգմանչաց Վանք) near Karhat (Armenian: Քարհատ, present-day Dashkesan in Azerbaijan, to the north of the Republic of Artsakh). The word Targmanchats (Armenian: Թարգմանչաց) meaning "Saint Translators," designates both St. Mesrob Mashtots and St. Sahak Partev (Armenian: Սբ. Սահակ Պարթև), head of the Armenian Church (387–436 AD) who sponsored Mashtots' scholarly and religious expeditions. Using Mashtots' alphabet, St. Sahak Partev translated the Bible from Syriac into Armenian in 411 AD (as testified by Mashtots' pupil Koryun in his biographic work about his teacher). The main church of the monastery, reconstructed in 989, consists of one vaulted room (single nave) with an apse on the east flanked by two small rooms.

The basilica of St. Gevorg (Սբ. Գևորգ, St. George) at the Tzitzernavank Monastery (Armenian: Ծիծեռնավանք) in Kashatagh, is not only an important religious site, but is the best-preserved example of an Armenian basilica with three naves. It is a large and well-preserved structure dating probably from the fifth or sixth centuries. It stands not far from the so-called Lachin Corridor, a territory that connects Armenia with the Republic of Artsakh. The word Tzitzernavank originates from the root "tzitzern" (Armenian: ծիծեռն) meaning "little finger" in Old Armenian. This points to a period in the history of the monastery when it was believed to contain relics of St. George the Dragon-Slayer. In the past, the monastery belonged to the Tatev eparchy and is mentioned as a notable religious center by the 13th-century historian Stephanos Orbelian (Armenian: Սթեփանոս Օրբելյան) and Bishop Tovma Vanandetsi (Armenian: Թովմա Վանանդեցի) in 1655. Beginning from 1992, the Tzitzernavank Monastery underwent renovation and became a venue of autumn festivals organized annually on St. George's Day. Tzitzernavank is an active monastery of the Armenian Apostolic Church.

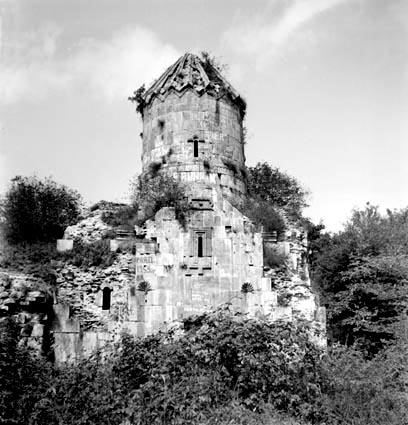
Gtichavank Monastery, 13th century, Nagorno Karabakh

Churches with a cupola built on a radiating or cruciform floor plan were numerous in Armenia during the seventh century, and are well represented in Artsakh. One example is the chapel at Vankasar (Armenian: Վանքասար) where the cupola and its drum rest on the central square of a cruciform floor plan. The chapel is located on the eastern frontier of the Republic of Artsakh, and was reputedly founded by Artsakh's celebrated monarch Vachagan II the Pious (Armenian: Վաչագան Բ Բարեպաշտ) of the early medieval Arranshahik dynasty (Armenian: Առանշահիկ). Another example is the Okhta Trne church at Mokhrenes (Armenian: Օխտը Տռնէ, "The Eight-Door Church"), probably dating from the fifth to seventh centuries. Its walls, roughly cut and bonded, enclose a quatrefoil interior with four small diagonal niches. Less common is the free cross plan with a cupola, found in the Chapel of St. Savior (Armenian: Սբ. Փրկիչ) in the Mardakert District.

Artsakh's designs at times differed from the course of the architectural evolution of mainland Armenia. Observations suggest that certain floor plans frequently employed in other regions of Armenia during the seventh century are not found in Artsakh. These include the chamber with a cupola supported by wall braces (e.g. the cathedral in Aruj, in the Aragatsotn Province of Armenia); the cruciform plan with a cupola on four free-standing pillars (e.g. St. Gayaneh Church in the Holy City of Echmiadzin, Armenia), and the radiating type with four rooms in a rectangle (e.g. St. Hripsimeh Church in the Holy City of Echmiadzin, Armenia).

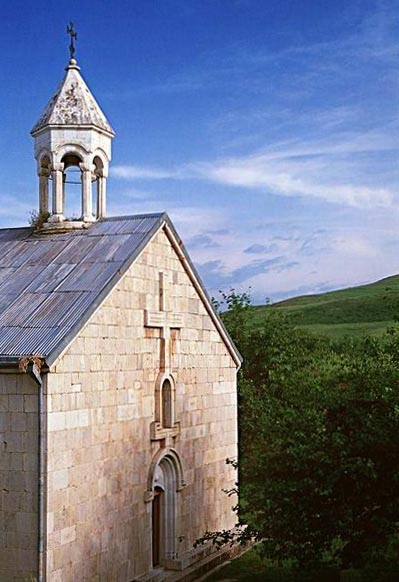
Church of St. Grigoris of the Amaras Monastery

Another peculiarity of the region is that few of Artsakh's monuments date from the post-Arab period or the rise of Armenian kingdoms (ninth to the eleventh centuries), which was a very productive artistic era in other Armenian provinces. The structures that could be attributed to that period are chapels on the cruciform plan with a cupola, such as the church at Varazgom (Armenian: Վարազգոմ) near Kashatagh, the Khunisavank Monastery (Armenian: Խունիսավանք) in Getabaks (now–Gedabey district of Azerbaijan, north to the Republic of Artsakh), and churches with a single nave, such as the church in Parissos (Armenian: Փարիսոս).

It was during the post-Seljuk period and the beginning of the Mongol period (late twelfth and thirteenth centuries) when Artsakh's architecture blossomed. Monasteries in this era served as active centers of art and scholarship. Most of them contained scriptoria where manuscripts were copied and illuminated. They also were fortified and often served as places of refuge for the population in times of trouble.

Several monastic churches from this period adopted the model used most widely throughout Armenia: a cathedral with a cupola in the inscribed cross plan with two or four angular chambers. Examples include the largest and most complex monasteries of Artsakh: Dadivank (Armenian: Դադիվանք, 1214–1237), Gandzasar (Armenian: Գանձասար, 1216–1238) and Gtichavank (Armenian: Գտիչավանք, 1241–1246). In the case of the Gandzasar and Gtichavank monasteries, the cone over the cupola is umbrella-shaped, a picturesque design that was originally developed by the architects of Armenia's former capital city of Ani, in the tenth century, and subsequently spread to other provinces of the country, including Artsakh.

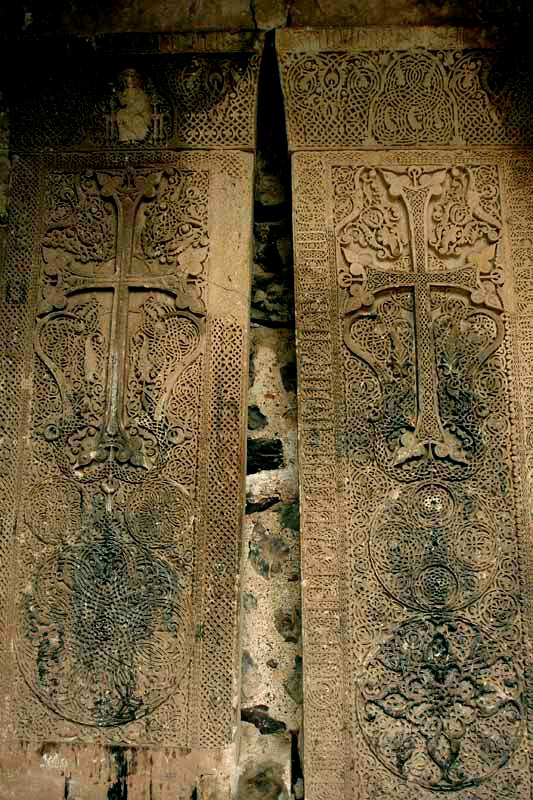
The famous 13th century Armenian-inscribed double khachkars of the Memorial Bell-Tower of the Dadivank Monastery

Like all Armenian monasteries, those in Artsakh reveal great geometric rigor in the layout of buildings. In this regard, the thirteenth century's Dadivank, the largest monastic complex in Artsakh and all of Eastern Armenia, located in the northwestern corner of the Mardakert District, is a remarkable case. Dadivank was sufficiently well preserved to leave no doubt that it was one of the most complete monasteries in the entire Caucasus. With its Memorial Cathedral of the Holy Virgin in the center, Dadivank has approximately twenty different structures, which are divided into four groups: ecclesiastical, residential, defensive and ancillary. Dadivank is an active monastery of the Armenian Apostolic Church.

A conspicuous characteristic of Armenian monastic architecture of the thirteenth century is the gavit (գավիթ, also called zhamatoun; Armenian: ժամանտուն). The gavits are special square halls usually attached to the western entrance of churches. They were very popular in large monastic complexes where they served as narthexes, assembly rooms and lecture halls, as well as vestibules for receiving pilgrims. Some appear as simple vaulted galleries open to the south (e.g. in the Metz Arrank Monastery; Armenian: Մեծառանից Վանք); others have an asymmetrical vaulted room with pillars (Gtichavank Monastery); or feature a quadrangular room with four central pillars supporting a pyramidal dome (the Dadivank Monastery). In another type of gavit, the vault is supported by a pair of crossed arches – in Horrekavank (Armenian: Հոռեկավանք) and Bri Yeghtze (Armenian: Բռի Եղցէ) monasteries.

The most famous gavit in Nagorno-Karabakh, though, is part of the Gandzasar Monastery. It was built in 1261 and is distinctive for its size and superior quality of workmanship. Its layout corresponds exactly to that of Haghbat (Armenian: Հաղբատ) and Mshakavank (Armenian: Մշակավանք)—two monasteries located in the northern part of Armenia. At the center of the ceiling, the cupola is illuminated by a central window which is adorned with the same stalactite ornaments as in Geghard (Armenian: Գեղարդ) and Harichavank (Armenian: Հառիճավանք)—monasteries in Armenia dating from the early thirteenth century.

The Gandzasar Monastery was the spiritual center of Khachen (Armenian: Խաչեն), the largest and most powerful principality in medieval Artsakh, by virtue of being home to the Katholicosate of Aghvank. Also known as the Holy See of Gandzasar, Katholicosate of Aghvank (Armenian: Աղվանից Կաթողիկոսություն) was one of the territorial subdivisions of the Armenian Apostolic Church.

Gandzasar's Cathedral of St. Hovhannes Mkrtich (Armenian: Սբ. Հովհաննես Մկրտիչ, designating St. John the Baptist) is one of the most well-known Armenian architectural monuments of all times. No surprise, Gandzasar is number one tourist attraction in the Republic of Artsakh. In its decor there are elements which relate it to three other monuments, in Armenia, from the early thirteenth century: the colonnade on the drum resembles that of Harichavank (Armenian: Հառիճավանք; built around 1201), and the great cross with a sculpture of Crucifixion at the top of the facade is also found at Kecharis (Armenian: Կեչառիսի Վանք, built around 1214) and Hovhannavank (Armenian: Հովհաննավանք, 1216–1250). Gandzasar an active monastery of the Armenian Apostolic Church.

Gandzasar and Dadivank are also well known for their bas-reliefs that embellish their domes and walls. After the Cathedral of St. Cross on the Lake Van (also known as Akhtamar-Ախթամար, in Turkey), Gandzasar contains the largest amount of sculpted decor compared to other architectural ensembles of Armenia. The most famous of Gandzasar's sculptures are Adam and Eve, Jesus Christ, the Lion (a symbol of the Vakhtangian princes (Armenian: Վախթանգյան իշխաններ) who built both Gandzasar and Dadivank), and the Churchwardens—each holding on his hands a miniature copy of the cathedral. In Dadivank, the most important bas-relief depicts the patrons of the monastery, whose stone images closely resemble those carved on the walls of the Haghbat, Kecharis and Harichavank monasteries, in Armenia.

Although in this period the focus in Artsakh shifted to more complex structures, churches with a single nave continued to be built in large numbers. One example is the monastery of St. Yeghishe Arakyal (Armenian: Սբ. Եղիշե Առաքյալ, also known as the Jrvshtik Monastery (Ջրվշտիկ), which in Armenian means "Longing-for-Water"), in the historical county of Jraberd, that has eight single-naved chapels aligned from north to south. One of these chapels is a site of high importance for the Armenians, as it serves as a burial ground for Artsakh's fifth-century monarch King Vachagan II the Pious Arranshahik. Also known as Vachagan the Pious for his devotion to the Christian faith and support in building a large number of churches throughout the region, King Vachagan is an epic figure whose deeds are immortalized in many of Artsakh's legends and fairytales. The most famous of those tells how Vachagan fell in love with the beautiful and clever Anahit, who then helped the young king defeat pagan invaders.

After an interruption that lasted from the fourteenth to the sixteenth centuries, architecture flourished again, in the seventeenth century. Many parish churches were built, and the monasteries, serving as bastions of spiritual, cultural and scholarly life, were restored and enlarged. The most notable of those is the Yerits Mankants Monastery ("Monastery of Three Infants," Armenian: Երից Մանկանց Վանք) that was built around 1691 in the county of Jraberd. The monastery was established by the feudal family of Melik-Israelians (Armenian: Մելիք-Իսրաելյան), Lords of Jraberd, with an apparent purpose to rival the Holy See of Gandzasar and its hereditary patrons—the Hasan-Jalalians, Lords of Khachen.

Artsakh's architecture of the nineteenth century is distinguished by a merger of innovation and the tradition of grand national monuments of the past. One example is the Cathedral of the Holy Savior also known as "Ghazanchetsots" (Armenian: Ղազանչեցոց Սբ. Ամենափրկիչ, 1868–1888) because it was erected in the historical Ghazanchetsots (Ղազանչեցոց) borough of Shusha. It stands in Shusha, former capital of Karabakh Khanate and is among the largest Armenian churches ever erected. The cathedral's architectural forms were influenced by the designs of the ancient cathedral of St. Echmiadzin (4th–9th centuries), center of the Armenian Apostolic Church located to the west of Armenia's capital of Yerevan. After the Karabakh War, the cathedral underwent restoration, and currently serves as an active house of worship of the Armenian Apostolic Church.

In addition to the Cathedral of the Holy Savior, Shusha hosted the Hermitage of Holy Virgins (Armenian: Կուսանաց Անապատ, 1816) and three other Armenian churches: Holy Savior "Meghretsots" (Armenian: Մեղրեցոց Սբ. Ամենափրկիչ, 1838), St. Hovhannes "Kanach Zham" (Armenian: Սբ. Հովհաննես, 1847) and Holy Savior "Aguletsots" (Armenian: Ագուլեցոց Սբ. Ամենափրկիչ, 1882).

In the nineteenth century, several Muslim monuments appear as well. They are linked to the emergence of the Karabakh Khanate, a short-lived, Muslim-ruled principality in Karabakh (1750s–1805). In the city of Shusha, three nineteenth-century mosques were built, which, together with two Russian Orthodox chapels, are the only non-Armenian architectural monuments found on the territories comprising the former Nagorno Karabakh Autonomous Region and today's Republic of Artsakh.

== Museums in Artsakh ==
Below is a list of museums that were in Artsakh, which encompasses institutions (including nonprofit organizations, government entities, and private businesses) that collect and care for objects of cultural, artistic, scientific, or historical interest and make their collections or related exhibits available for public viewing. Museums that exist only in cyberspace (i.e., virtual museums) are not included. Also included are non-profit art galleries and exhibit spaces.

List of museums in Archer - Collin counties, Texas
| Museum name | City | Notes | Refs |
|---|---|---|---|
| Martakert Historical and Geographical Museum | Martakert | Ethnography | |
| Askeran Historical-Geological Museum | Askeran | Archeology | |
| Armenian Dram Museum | Shusha | Armenian coins | |
| Berdashen History Museum | Berdashen | Archeology | |
| Geographical Museum of Kashatagh region | Berdzor Kashatagh | Archeology | |
| Artsakh State Museum | Stepanakert | Archeological and cultural history of the Artsakh people | |
| House of Khurshidbanu Natavan | Shusha | 18th or 19th-century historical and architectural monument | |
| House-Museum of Uzeyir Hajibeyov (Shusha) | Shusha | Uzeyir Hajibeyov – an Azerbaijani composer | |
| House of Nikol Duman | Tsakhkashat | 19 century reconstructed buildings | |
| Martuni Historical-Geographical Museum | Martuni | Ethnography, archeology, medieval artifacts | |
| Museum after Tevan Stepanyan in Tumi | Hadrut | Dedicated to Tevan Stepanyan | |
| State Archaeological Museum of Kashatagh | Kashatagh | Artifacts discovered during archaeological digs in the Kashatagh region. | |
| Shushi Carpet Museum | Shusha | Carpets woven from the 17th century to the beginning of the 20th century. | |
| Shushi State Museum of Fine Arts | Shusha | Showing of local artists | |
| Stepanakert Gallery | Stepanakert | Paintings of Artsakh artists | |
| Togh's Melikian Palace | Togh (Tugh) | Archeological materials unearthed during excavations in the area of the palace | |
| Museum of Fine Arts of the Republic of Artsakh | Shusha | Art Gallery of local artists | |
| State Archaeological Museum of Tigranakert | Aghdam District | Ruined city dating back to the Hellenistic period | |
| Museum to the Memory of Perished Azatamartiks | Stepanakert | Armenian War Museum | |
| Shushi Museum of History | Shusha | The museum was closed after the capture of Shusha on May 8, 1992. | |
| Azerbaijan State Museum of History of Karabakh | Shusha | Defunct | |

== Monuments of civil architecture ==
From the 17th and 18th centuries, several palaces of Armenian meliks (Armenian: մելիք, duke) should be noted, especially the Palace of the Melik-Beglarian (Armenian: Մելք-Բեգլարյան) family in Giulistan (in the Shahumian District), Palace of the Melik-Avanian (Armenian: Մելք-Ավանյան) family in Togh (in the Hadrut District), Palace of the Melik-Mnatzakanian (Armenian: Մելք-Մնացականյան) family in Getashen, Palace of the Melik-Haikazian (Armenian: Մելիք-Հայկազյան) family in Kashatagh (in the Kashatagh-Lachin District), Palace of the Melik-Dolukhanian (Armenian: Մելք-Դոլուխանյան) family in Tukhnakal (near Stepanakert) and, finally, Palace of the Khan of Karabakh in the city of Shusha. Princely palaces from earlier epochs, while badly damaged by time, are equally if not more impressive. Among those preserved is the Palace of the Dopian Princes, Lords of Tzar, near Aknaberd (in the Mardakert District).

Artsakh's medieval inns (called "idjevanatoun;" Armenian: իջևանատուն) comprise a separate category of civil structures. The best preserved example of those is found near the town of Hadrut.

Before its destruction in 1920 the main repository of the region's civil architecture was Shusha. In the late 19th century, Shusha became one of the largest cities in Caucasus. In 1913, it hosted more than 42,000 people.

Shusha's architecture had its unique style and spirit. That special style synthesized designs used in building grand homes in Artsakh's rural areas (especially in the southern county of Dizak) and elements of neo-classical European architecture. The quintessential example of Shusha's residential dwellings is the house of the Avanesantz family (19th century). Shusha's administrative buildings of note include: Royal College (1875), Eparchial College (1838), Technical School (1881) summer and winter clubs of the City Hall (1896 and 1901), The Zhamharian Hospital (1900), The Khandamirian Theater (1891), The Holy Virgin Women's College (1864) and Mariam Ghukassian Nobility High School (1894). Of these buildings, only Royal College and the Zhamharian Hospital survived the Turko-Muslim attack on the city in 1920.

The best-preserved examples of Artsakh's rural civil architecture are found in historical settlements of Banants (Armenian: Բանանց), Getashen (Armenian: Գետաշեն), Hadrut (Armenian: Հադութ) and Togh (Armenian: Տող).

== History of vandalism and destruction ==
The first record of damage to historical monuments occurred during the early medieval period. During the Armenian-Persian war of 451–484 AD, the Amaras Monastery was wrecked by Persian conquerors who sought to bring pagan practices back to Armenia. Later, In 821, Armenia was overrun by Arabs, and Amaras was plundered. In the same century, however, the monastery was rebuilt under the patronage of Prince Yesai (Armenian: Եսայի Իշխան Առանշահիկ), Lord of Dizak, who bravely fought against the invaders. In 1223, as testified by the Bishop Stephanos Orbelian (died in 1304), Amaras was looted again—at this time, by the Mongols—who took with them St. Grigoris' crosier and a large golden cross decorated with 36 precious stones. According to Orbelian, the wife of the Mongolian leader, Byzantine Princess Despina, proposed to send the cross and the crosier to Constantinople.

In 1387, Amaras and ten other monasteries of Artsakh were attacked by Tamerlane's hordes from Central Asia. According to a local Armenian legend, Tamerlane destroyed Amaras and ordered his soldiers to make up a miles-long line from the monastery all the way to the River Arax. Tamerlane's soldiers were passing on the stones of the demolished buildings from one person to another and throwing them into the water to form a bridge. But as soon as the conquerors left the region, the legend says, the region's inhabitants rushed to the river, brought the stones back and rebuilt the monastery to its original state. It must have been at that time when Amaras' famous scriptorium was established.

Shortly after the Armenian genocide and the end of the Caucasus Campaign in 1918, a Pogrom instigated by the Muslim Azerbaijani Population in 1920 resulted in the destruction of the entire Armenian quarter of the city, which had a devastating effect on cities architecture heritage and position as a major trade city and producer of silk in the 19th century. After the entry of Turko-Islamic nomads to Karabakh's highlands in the 1750s, the city became divided into two parts: Armenian and Muslim. Although the Islamic Turkic tribesmen (known since the 1930s as "Azerbaijanis") constituted a small percentage of the population of Artsakh's highlands, their largest concentration was in Shusha, where they lived in peace with the Armenian population there. However, during the early 20th century the cities cosmopolitan and tolerant attitude began to fall apart, and became a venue of sporadic inter-communal violence, but it was in March 1920 when it received the deadliest blow of all. Aided by expeditionary Ottoman forces, armed Turko-Tartar ("Azerbaijani") bands burned and destroyed the Armenian section of the city, murdering most of its Armenian residents in the process— some 20,000 people in total.

The city's three out of five Armenian churches were totally destroyed by the Turkic bands: Holy Savior "Meghretzotz" (Armenian: Մեղրեցոց Սբ. Փրկիչ, built in 1838), Holy Savior "Aguletzotz" (Armenian: Ագուլեցոց Սբ. Փրկիչ, built in 1882) and Hermitage of Holy Virgins (Armenian: Կուսանաց Անապատ, built in 1816). The Cathedral of the Holy Savior (1868–1888) was desecrated and severely damaged. With as many as 7,000 buildings demolished, Shusha has never been restored to its former grandeur. Instead, it shrank, becoming a small town populated by Azerbaijanis(14 thousand residents in 1987 versus 42 thousand in 1913). It stood in ruins from 1920 up to the mid-1960s, when the ruins of the city's Armenian half were bulldozed by orders from Baku and cheaply built apartment complexes were built on top of them.

The Karabakh War (1991–1994) likewise left its deep scars on the architectural face of Nagorno Karabakh. The Azerbaijani Army intentionally targeted Armenian Christian monuments for the purpose of their demolition, using, among a variety of means, heavy artillery and military airplanes. Both Amaras and Gandzasar monasteries suffered in the process. Robert Bevan writes: "The Azeri campaign against the Armenian enclave of Nagorno Karabakh which began in 1988 was accompanied by cultural cleansing that destroyed the Egheazar monastery and 21 other churches."

== Fortresses, castles and princely palaces ==
The fortresses of the region (called "berd" in Armenian; բերդ) were usually built on hard-to-reach rocks or on the tips of mountains, using the rugged and heavily forested terrain of the region. Some of the fortresses in Nagorno Karabakh include Jraberd (Armenian: Ջրաբերդ), Handaberd (Armenian: Հանդաբերդ), Kachaghakaberd (Armenian: Կաչաղակաբերդ), Shikakar (Armenian: Շիկաքար), Giulistan (Armenian: Գյուլիստան), Mairaberd (Armenian: Մայրաբերդ), Toghaberd (Armenian: Տողաբերդ), Aknaberd (Armenian: Ակնաբերդ), and Aghjkaberd (Armenian: Աղջկաբերդ). These Castles belonged to Artsakh's aristocratic families, safeguarding their domains against foreign invaders that came from the eastern steppes. The forts were established very early in the history of the region, and each successive generation of their custodians contributed to their improvement.

When the Principality of Khachen forged ties with the Kingdom of Cilicia (1080–1375), an independent Armenian state on the Mediterranean Sea that aided the Crusaders, a small number of Artsakh's fortifications acquired a certain Cilician look as a result.

The Handaberd Castle, the traditional stronghold of the Vakhtangian-Dopian Princes located in Karvachar (Armenian: Քարվաճառ, Azerbaijan's former district of Kelbajar), was rebuilt with a grant received from Cilicia's King Levon I; for that it was also known as "Levonaberd" (Armenian: Լևոնաբերդ).

Karabakh's most remarkable pieces of fortifications, though, are the Citadel of Shusha and Askeran Fortress. Backed by an intricate system of camps, recruiting centers, watchtowers and fortified beacons, both belonged to the so-called Lesser Syghnakh (Armenian: Փոքր Սղնախ), which was one of Artsakh's two main historical military districts responsible for defending the southern counties of Varanda and Dizak. When the Citadel of Shusha was founded by Panah Ali Khan Javanshir, the founder of the Karabakh Khanate, its walls and other fortifications were built.

== Khachkars ==
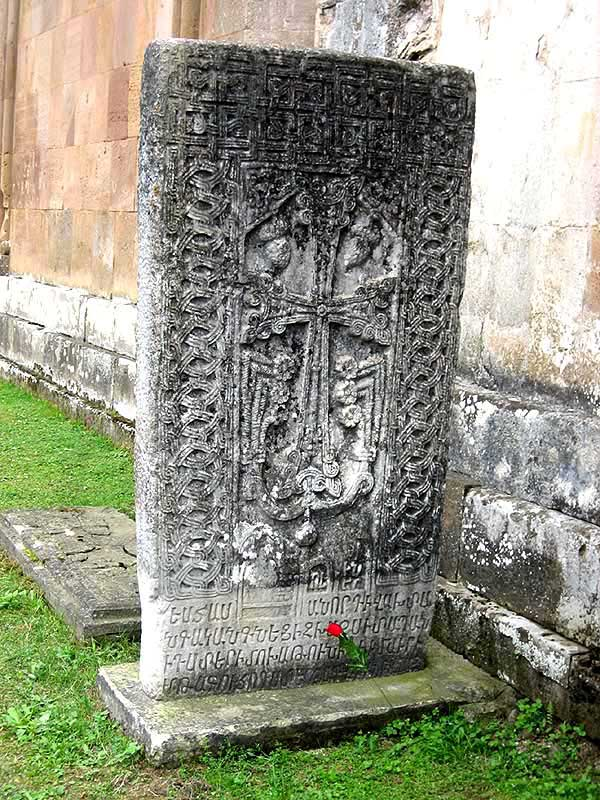
A large 13th century Armenian-inscribed khachkar outside of the Cathedral of St. John the Baptist, Gandzasar Monastery

Khachkars (Armenian: խաչքար), stone slab monuments decorated with a cross, represent a special chapter in the history of sculpture, and are unique to historical Armenia.

In the first stage of their evolution, this type of monuments already existed in Artsakh, as attested by one of the earliest dated samples found on the eastern shore of the Lake Sevan (at Metz Mazra, year 881) which at that time was part of the dominion of Artsakh's Princes of Tzar. A very large number of khachkars is also found on the territory of today's Republic of Artsakh and adjacent regions.

Several thirteenth-century examples look particularly refined, and a few of them deserve a special attention for their superior design. The two khachkars of the Gtichavank Monastery (Armenian: Գտիչավանք) dating from about 1246 (one of which is preserved at St. Echmiadzin in Armenia), show the two bishops who founded Gtichavank. There are also the two tall khachkar plaques placed inside the Memorial Bell-Tower at the Dadivank Monastery (1283), which are veritable laceworks in stone.

Artsakh's most well-known example of embedded khachkars—where khachkars standing next to each other form some kind of hooded iconostas-in-stone—is the Bri Yeghtze Monastery (Armenian: Բռի Եղծէ Վանք), in the historical country of Varanda (Armenian: Վարանդա, presently in the Martuni District of the Republic of Artsakh). The use of embedded khachkars in Bri Yeghtze is the same as in the Tzaghatz Kar Monastery (Armenian: Ցաղաղ Քարի Վանք, in Vayots Dzor Province of Armenia) and in the Horomos Monastery near Kars (Armenian: Հոռոմոսի Վանք, now in Turkey).

A large khachkar, brought from Artsakh's Metz Arants Hermitage (Armenian: Մեծ Առանց Անապատ) to St. Echmiadzin, represents a rare type of the so-called "winged crosses" which resemble Celtic cross stones from Scotland and Ireland. The largest collection of standing khachkars in Artsakh is in the area called Tsera Nahatak, near the village of Badara.

== Lapidary inscriptions ==
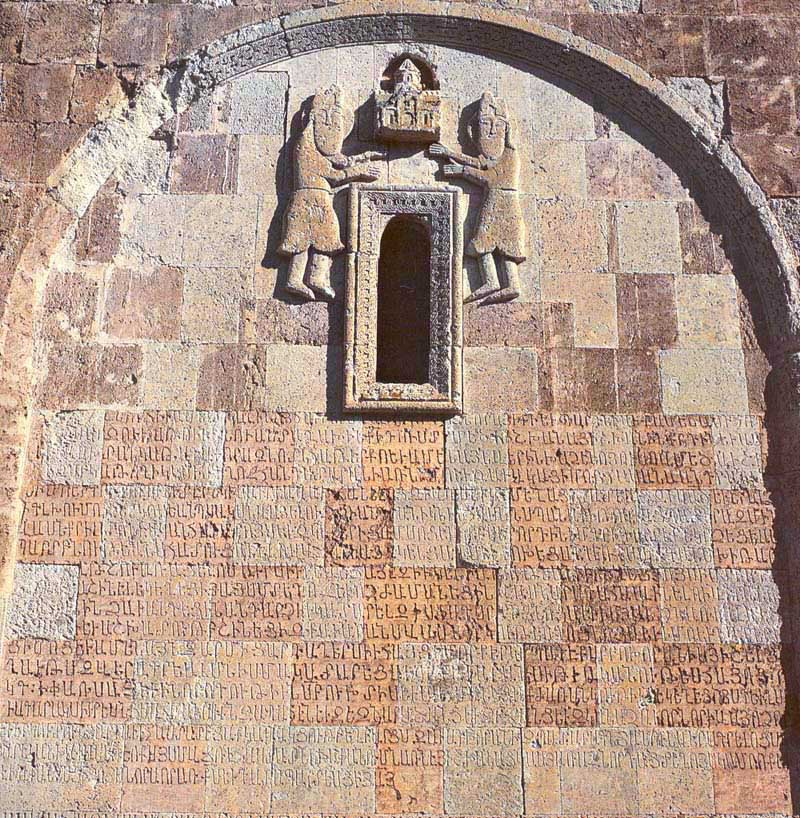
Armenian-inscribed text of Queen Arzu of Haterk, Dadivank Monastery (13th century)

In most cases, facades and walls of Artsakh's churches and monasteries contain engraved texts in Armenian that often provide the precise date of construction, names of patrons and, sometimes, even name of the architect. The number of such texts exceeds several hundred.

Covering the walls of churches and monasteries with ornamented texts in Armenian developed in Artsakh, and in many other places in historical Armenia, into a unique form of decor. Compared with other Armenian lands, Artsakh contains a very large number of Armenian lapidary (inscribed in stone) texts per unit of territory, which date from the 5th century. The most notable and extensive of those cover entire walls of the Dadivank and Gandzasar monasteries.

A prominent inscription, for instance, details the foundation of Dadivank's Memorial Cathedral; it covers a large area of the cathedral's southern facade. It begins with the following section:

"By the grace of God Almighty and his only begotten son Jesus Christ, and by the grace of the most Holy Spirit, I, Arzou Hatun, humble servant of the Christ, the daughter of the greatest prince of princes Kurt and the spouse of the Crown Prince Vakhtang, Lord of Haterk and the whole of Upper Khachen, with utmost hope have built this holy cathedral in the place of the last rest of my husband and my two sons … My elder [son] Hasan martyred for his Christian faith in the war against the Turks; and in three months my younger son Grigor died of natural causes and passed to the Christ, leaving his mother in inconsolable mourning. While [my sons] were alive, they vowed to build a church to the glory of God … and I undertook the construction of this expiatory temple with utmost hope and diligence, for the salvation of their souls, and mine and all of my nephews. Thus I plead: while worshipping before the holy altar, remember my prayers inscribed on this church … Completed in the year [modern 1214] of the Armenian Calendar…"

Another historic text inscribed in Armenian is found on the tombstone of St. Grigoris, Bishop of Artsakh, at the Amaras Monastery. St. Grigoris was St. Gregory the Enlightener's grandson who martyred preaching Gospel in the Northern Caucasus:

"The tomb of St. Grigoris, Katholicos of Aghvank, grandson of St. Gregory; born in [322 AD], anointed in the year [340 AD], martyred in the year [348 AD] in Derbend, by King Sanesan of the Mazkuts; his holy remains were brought to Amaras by his pupils, deacons from Artsakh."

== Fresco art ==
Few of Artsakh's frescoes were preserved, but those which survived are important for the history of Armenian fresco art because of their unique compositional features and color schemes. The largest collection of Artsakh's frescos are found inside the Memorial Cathedral (1214), at the Dadivank Monastery. The Memorial Cathedral was built by the orders of Queen Arzou of Haterk. The paintings depict Saint Mary, Jesus Christ and Saint Nicholas, with a group of angels and worshippers.

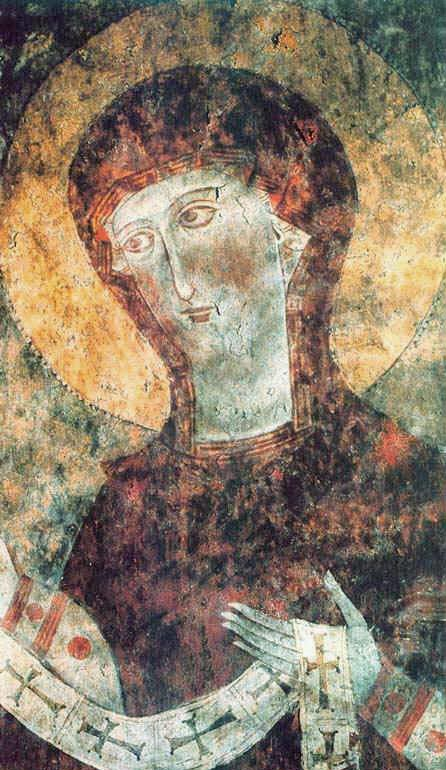
The 13th-century fresco painting of the Holy Virgin inside the Memorial Cathedral of the Dadivank Monastery

The fresco on the southern wall shows the Holy Virgin in a long robe with a red kerchief tied around her head. She is holding an oration adorned with crosses. Another fresco portrays the Christ, as he is giving the Gospel to Saint Nicholas. The fresco on the northern wall represents the birth of Jesus: Saint Joseph stands at Mary's bedside, and the three magicians kneel in adoration in front; cherubs fly in the sky above them, singing Glory in Highest Heaven. A native of Artsakh and the 13th century author Kirakos Gandzaketsi (Armenian: Կիրակոս Գանձակեցի) hints in his "History of Armenia" that Queen Arzou (Armenian: Առզու Թագուհի) and her daughters were gifted with exceptional artistic talent, so it has been theorized that they could have been among those who helped paint the murals. Other than at Dadivank, Some other frescoes are found in the main parish church of the town of Arajadzor in Mardakert District.

== Illuminated manuscripts ==
More than thirty known medieval manuscripts originate in Artsakh, Many of which are 13th and 14th century illuminated manuscripts created during the Principality of Khachen. These scripts were created in Ganja, Azerbaijan, as well as at Karabakh's monasteries of Gandzasar, Khoranashat (Armenian: Խորանաշատ), Targmanchatz, Holy Virgin of Tzar (Armenian: Ծառա Սբ. Աստվածածին) and Yerits Mankants (Armenian: Երից Մանկանց Վանք). A group of illuminated works is specific to the regions of Artsakh and Utik; in their linear and unadorned style they resemble miniatures of the Syunik and Vaspurakan schools. These compositions are simple and monumental, often with an iconography that is original and distinct from Byzantine models. Besides depicting biblical stories, several of Artsakh's manuscripts attempt to convey the images of the rulers of the region who often ordered the rewriting and illumination of the texts. Manuscript No. 115 preserved at the Matenadaran Institute of Ancient Manuscripts in Yerevan, Armenia contains a miniature portrait of Prince Vakhtang Tangik (Armenian: Վախթանգ Թանգիկ, Vakhtang the Precious) Lord of Haterk.

During the 12th–15th centuries several dozens of well-known scriptoria functioned in Artsakh and neighboring Utik. The best period of Artsakh's miniature painting may be divided into two main stages. The first one includes the second half of the 12th and the beginning of the 13th centuries. The second stage includes the second half of the 13th century to the beginning of the 14th century. Among the most interesting works of the first stage one can mention the Matenadaran manuscript no. 378, called the Gospel of Prince Vakhtang Khachentsi (produced in 1212), and the Matenadaran manuscript no. 4829, a Gospel produced in 1224 and associated with the name of Princess Vaneni Jajro.

== Carpets and rugs ==
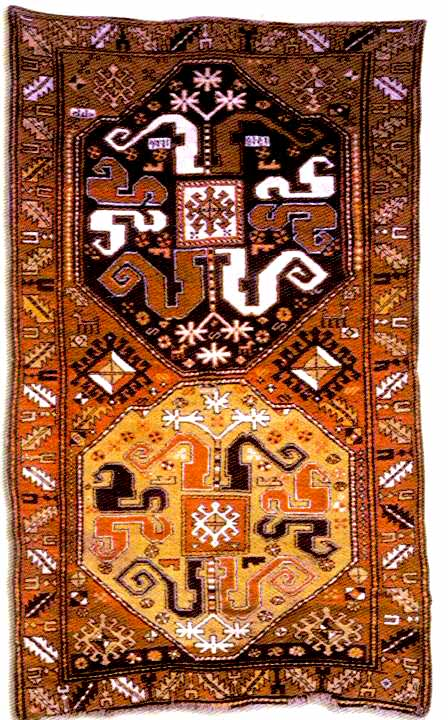
A Karabakh carpet of Malibayli sub-group. Malibayli village of Shusha, 1813)

Carpets and rugs are a form of art which is central to the artistic identity of the region. It is known that in the tenth century dyed fabrics and rugs from Artsakh were highly valued in the Arab world. Two accounts by the historian Kirakos Gandzaketsi mention embroideries and altar curtains handmade by his contemporaries Arzou and Khorishah—two princesses of the House of Upper Khachen (Haterk/Հաթերք)—for the Dadivank Monastery. In the 19th century, local rugs and samples of natural silk production became part of international exhibitions and art fairs in Moscow, Philadelphia and Paris.

The abundance of rugs produced in the modern period is rooted in this solid ancient tradition. Indeed, recent research has begun to highlight the importance of the Armenian region of Artsakh in the history of a broader group of rugs classified as "Caucasian." Woven works by Artsakh's Armenians come in several types. Rugs in an "eaglebands" (Armenian: արծվագորգ/artzvagorg) or "sunburst" (Armenian: արևագորգ/arevagorg) pattern, a sub-type of Armenian rug featuring dragons, whose manufacturing center from the eighteenth century was Artsakh's county of Jraberd, have characteristically large radiating medallions. Other rugs come with ornaments resembling serpents ("serpentbands;" Armenian: օձագորգ/odzagorg) or clouds with octagonal medallions comprising four pairs of serpents in an "S" shape, and rugs with a series of octagonal, cross-shaped or rhomboid medallions, often bordered by a red band.

Artsakh is also the source of some of the oldest rugs bearing Armenian inscriptions: the rug with three niches from the town of Banants (1602), the rug of Catholicos Nerses of Aghvank (1731), and the famous Guhar (Gohar) Rug (1700). It should also be added that most rugs with Armenian inscriptions come from Artsakh.

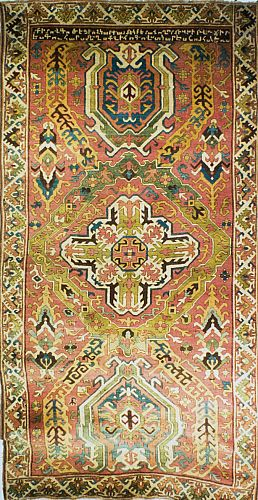
Armenian Carpet "Gohar" with Armenian inscription, 1700, Artsakh (Nagorno-Karabakh)

== See also ==
- Armenian Cultural Heritage in Azerbaijan
- Culture of Armenia

== Bibliography ==
- Armenia: 1700 years of Christian Architecture. Moughni Publishers, Yerevan, 2001
- Tom Masters and Richard Plunkett. Georgia, Armenia & Azerbaijan, Lonely Planet Publications; 2 edition (July 2004)
- Nicholas Holding. Armenia with Nagorno Karabagh, Bradt Travel Guides; Second edition (October, 2006)
