= Vəng =

Vəng may refer to:

- Vəng, Ismailli, Azerbaijan
- Vəng, Kalbajar, Azerbaijan

Veng may refer to:

- Veng (Denmark)
