= Artsakh State Museum =

Armenian Museum

Artsakh State Historical Museum of Local Lore
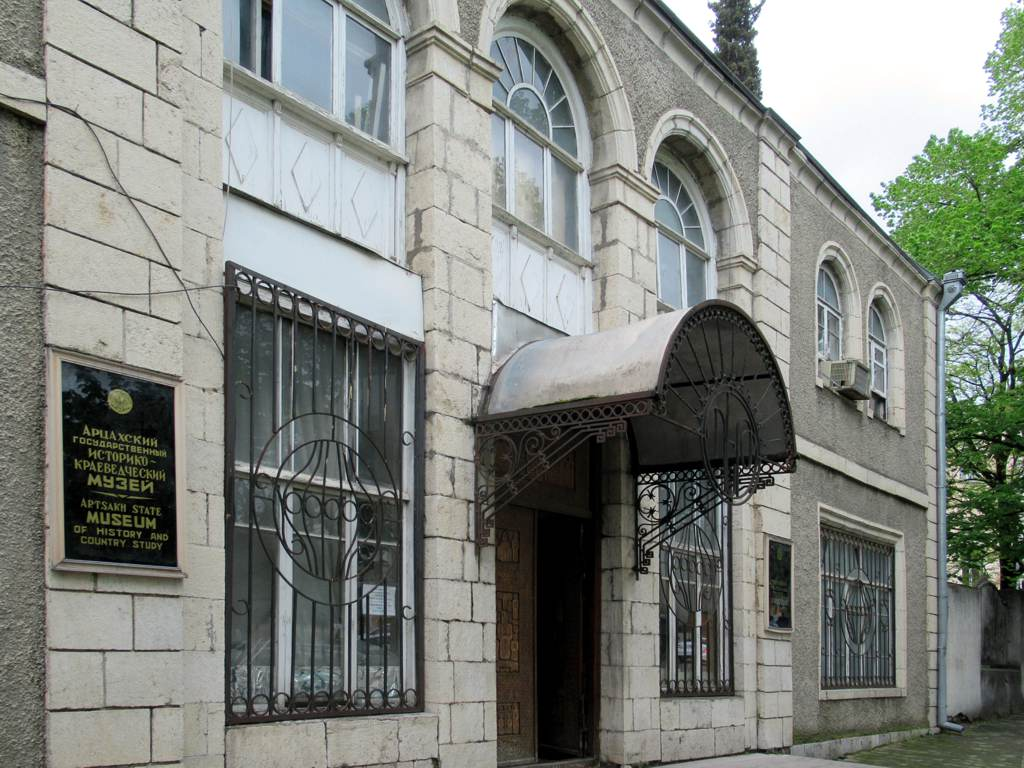
- Artsakh State Historical Museum

- Location within Azerbaijan
- Established: 1939
- Location: Stepanakert, S. Davit St., Building 4
- Coordinates: 39.81744°N 46.75436°E
- Type: Archaeological museum
- Key holdings: Origins and development of the territory and its inhabitants.
- Collection size: 50,000
- Website: https://artsakh-heritage.aua.am/artsakh-state-historical-museum-of-local-lore/

The Artsakh State Historical Museum of Local Lore was a museum in Stepanakert, Azerbaijan. The museum was founded in 1939. The museum aimed to preserve the archeological and cultural history of the Artsakh people. It boasted 50,000 historical-cultural artifacts, presenting the origins and development of the territory and its inhabitants. Recent archaeological excavation conducted in the region had provided further opportunity for the museum to enrich its collection.

Upon entering the museum, the exhibition halls started off with models demonstrating Artsakh's natural landscape. Further down was the hall of archeology where models of petrification, early implements of the Stone Age, different bronze subjects (utensils, weapons, adornments), preservations from times of the state of Urartu, amazing ornamented ceramic vessels, Armenian, Roman, Persian, Arabian silver and copper coins, and so on.

When entering the hall of the Middle Ages, the section started off with a photo and map of the first churches in Artsakh (4th century): Amaras monastery, founded by Gregory the illuminator, the first Armenian Christian philosopher. There was also a documentary available at this part of the exhibit where evidence of his propagations in South Caucasus are presented. In the department of ethnography, the gallery began with the show-case of the Artsakhian family life. Here, there were images and a diorama of a grandmother knitting with distaff while the grandfather sews leather footwear. There was also an old carpet weaving loom and samples of Artsakh weaving art- carpets of 18-20 cc. In 19c. the center of the Armenian national culture was Shoushi city; of it the old gospel, printed books and photos tell.

The halls of modern history were rich in documentary artefacts where exhibits depicting the national liberation fight of Artsakhian Armenians against Azerbaijan in 1918–21 are shown. Here the map of Armenia of 1926 was presented, fulfilled on the basis of the union treaty of the 10th of August, 1920, as well as documents confirming the tragic events in Shoushi on the 23d of March, 1920, and describing about the forced annexation of Nagorno-Karabakh to the Soviet Azerbaijan.

The last halls of the museum detailed modern-life in Artsakh and the national-liberation war, and discussed themes of broader Armenian solidarity.

There was a small gift shop in the museum, where one can buy booklets, books and photo albums dedicated to Artsakh. The museum was open every day except Sundays.

== See also ==
- List of museums in Azerbaijan
