= Vəng, Ismailli =

Village in north central Azerbaijan

Vəng
- Municipality
- Location within Azerbaijan
- Coordinates: 40°48′37″N 47°55′42″E
- Country: Azerbaijan
- Rayon: Ismailli

Population
  - Total: 400
- Time zone: UTC+4 (AZT)
  - Summer (DST): UTC+5 (AZT)

Vəng (also called Bank, Vank, and Vank Pervyy) is a village and municipality in the Ismailli Rayon of Azerbaijan. It has a population of 400.
