= Dadivank =

Medieval Armenian monastery in Azerbaijan

- Դադիվանք
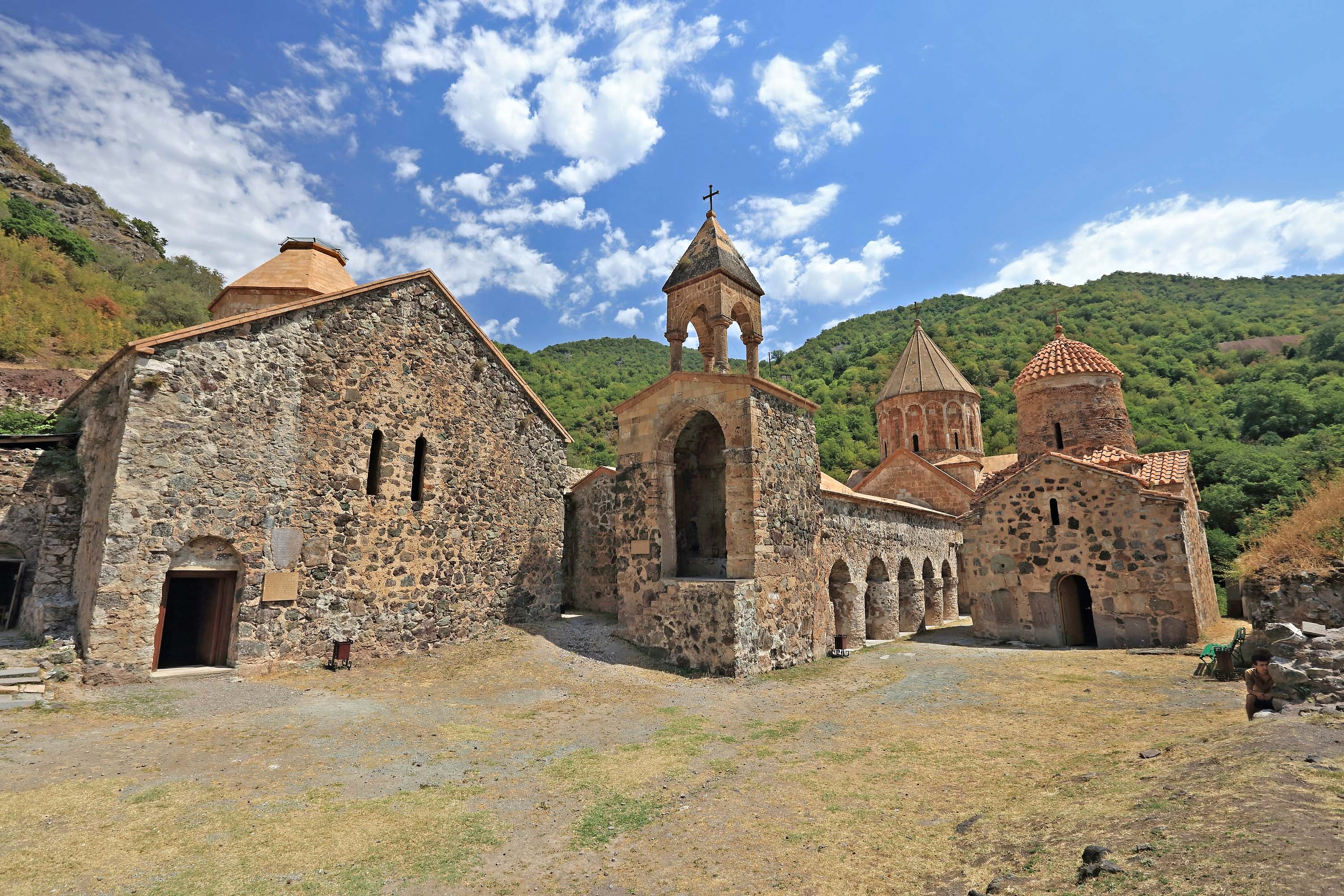
- The monastery of Dadivank

- Location within Azerbaijan

Religion
- Affiliation: Armenian Apostolic Church

Location
- Location: Vəng, Azerbaijan
- Interactive map of Dadivank
- Coordinates: 40.1616°N 46.2882°E

Architecture
- Type: Monastery, Church
- Style: Armenian
- Completed: 9th–13th centuries

Dadivank (Armenian: Դադիվանք) or Khutavank (Armenian: Խութավանք, lit. 'monastery on the hill') is an Armenian Apostolic monastery in the Kalbajar District of Azerbaijan. It was built between the 9th and 13th centuries and is one of the main monastic complexes of medieval Armenia.

In Azerbaijan, the monastery is called Dadivəng or Xudavəng. Azerbaijan denies the monastery's Armenian religious and cultural heritage, instead controversially referring to it as a "Caucasian Albanian temple."

== History and architecture ==
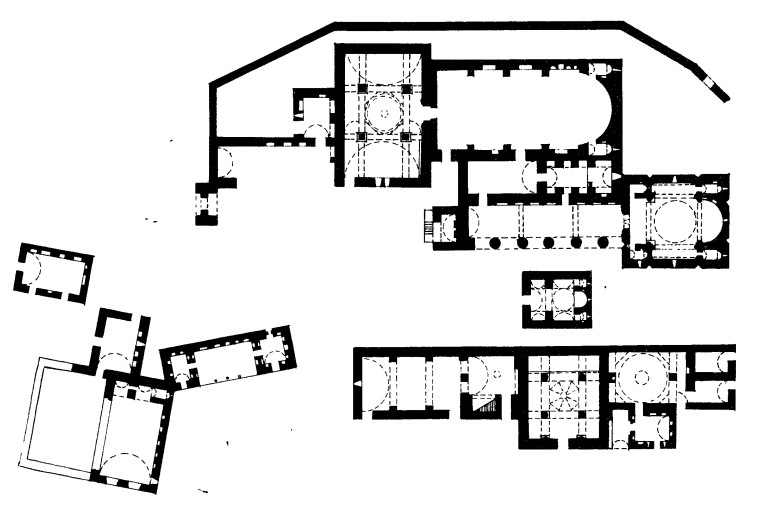
Plan of Dadivank

The monastery is said to have been founded by St. Dadi, a disciple of Thaddeus the Apostle who spread Christianity in Eastern Armenia during the first century AD. However, the monastery is only first mentioned in the 9th century. In July 2007, the grave said to belong to St. Dadi was discovered under the holy altar of the main church. The princes of Upper Khachen are also buried at Dadivank, under the church's gavit (narthex).

The monastery belongs to the Diocese of Artsakh of the Armenian Apostolic Church, and consists of the cathedral church of the Holy Mother of God, the chapel, a kitchen and refectory, and a few other buildings. The main church has Armenian script engraved into its walls, in addition to several 13th-century frescoes. The bas-relief on the south facade of the cathedral at Dadivank, built in 1214, shows the princess offering the church in memory of her sons. According to Paolo Cuneo, Dadivank is one of two monasteries along with Gandzasar where bust motifs (possibly the donors of the monasteries) are encountered. Antony Eastmond places Dadivank's construction within a wider context of examples of female patronage of ecclesiastical buildings in the thirteenth-century Near Eastern world.

=== Modern period ===
In 1994, following the end of the First Nagorno-Karabakh War, the monastery resumed service, and in 2004, a renovation process began with funding from Armenian-American businesswoman Edele Hovnanian, ending in 2005. The restoration efforts restored the cathedral, along with a chapel which was restored by Edik Abrahamian, an Iranian-Armenian from Tehran.

On 8 October 2001, a motion was proposed at the Parliamentary Assembly of the Council of Europe at the behest of sixteen parliamentary members on the "Maintenance of historical and cultural heritage in the Nagorno-Karabakh Republic." The motion cited as an example "the destruction of Zar (Tsar) monuments in the Kelbajar region, Dadivank, which the local Muslim population regarded as remnants of the Armenian Christian religion and ruined the monastery as it could".

In August 2017, Italian specialists who had previously conducted restoration operations at Dadivank returned to continue their cleaning and restoration of the monastery. They had already restored the four chapels and their frescoes and were planning to restore inscriptions and ornaments near the doors to the chapels. The entire restoration project was planned to be completed by 2020.

=== 2020 war and current status ===
In the aftermath of the Nagorno-Karabakh war in 2020, which resulted in a ceasefire agreement stipulating the withdrawal of Armenian forces from Kalbajar District and its return to Azerbaijan, the monastery was included in the territory to come under Azerbaijani control. The abbot of the Dadivank Monastery made the decision to transport the monastery's relics of significance, including bells, crosses, and khachkars, to Armenia for protection from destruction by the Azerbaijani government. Azerbaijan called it an "illegal activity" and added that it would take action to enforce legal procedures.

On 28 November 2020, the Azerbaijani Ministry of Defence released footage from inside the monastery. On 4 December 2020, representatives of the Udi community of Azerbaijan visited the monastery and performed a prayer inside. The next day, Rafik Danakari, the deputy chairman of the Udi Christian Orthodox community, was appointed preacher at the monastery.

A sale-exhibition From Dadivank to Yerevan was held on 16 December at the Museum of Folk Art in the Armenian capital. After the withdrawal of Armenian forces from the region, the monastery was placed under the protection of the Russian peacekeeping forces. In late December additional Armenian clergymen arrived at the monastery and the first wedding ceremony was performed after the war, under the protection of Russian peacekeepers.

After the 2023 Azerbaijani offensive in Nagorno Karabakh, the monastery is under Azerbaijani control and has been controversially renamed the "Xudavəng Caucasian Albanian Monastery", denying the monastery's Armenian origins.

== Gallery ==
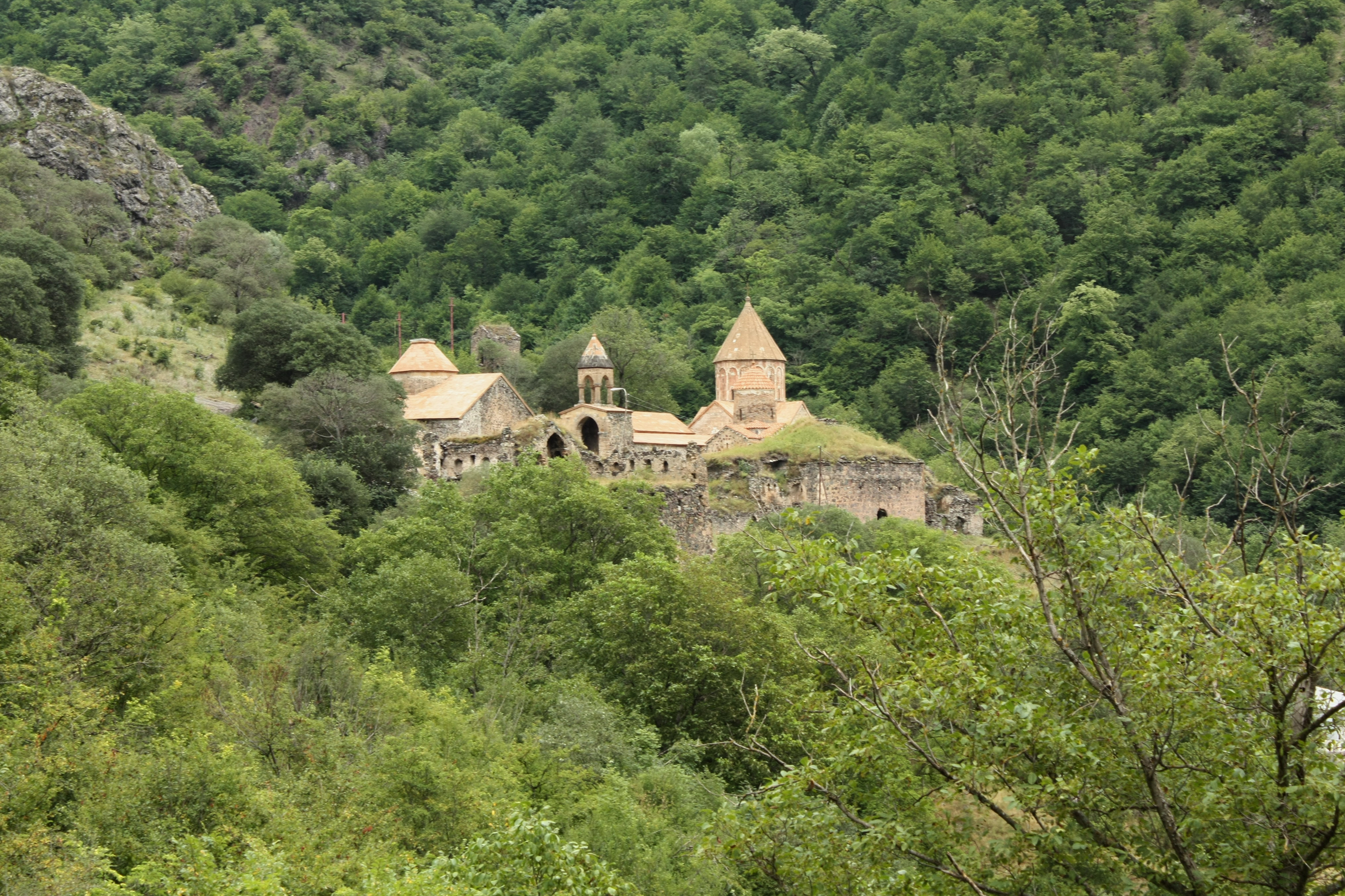
Dadivank

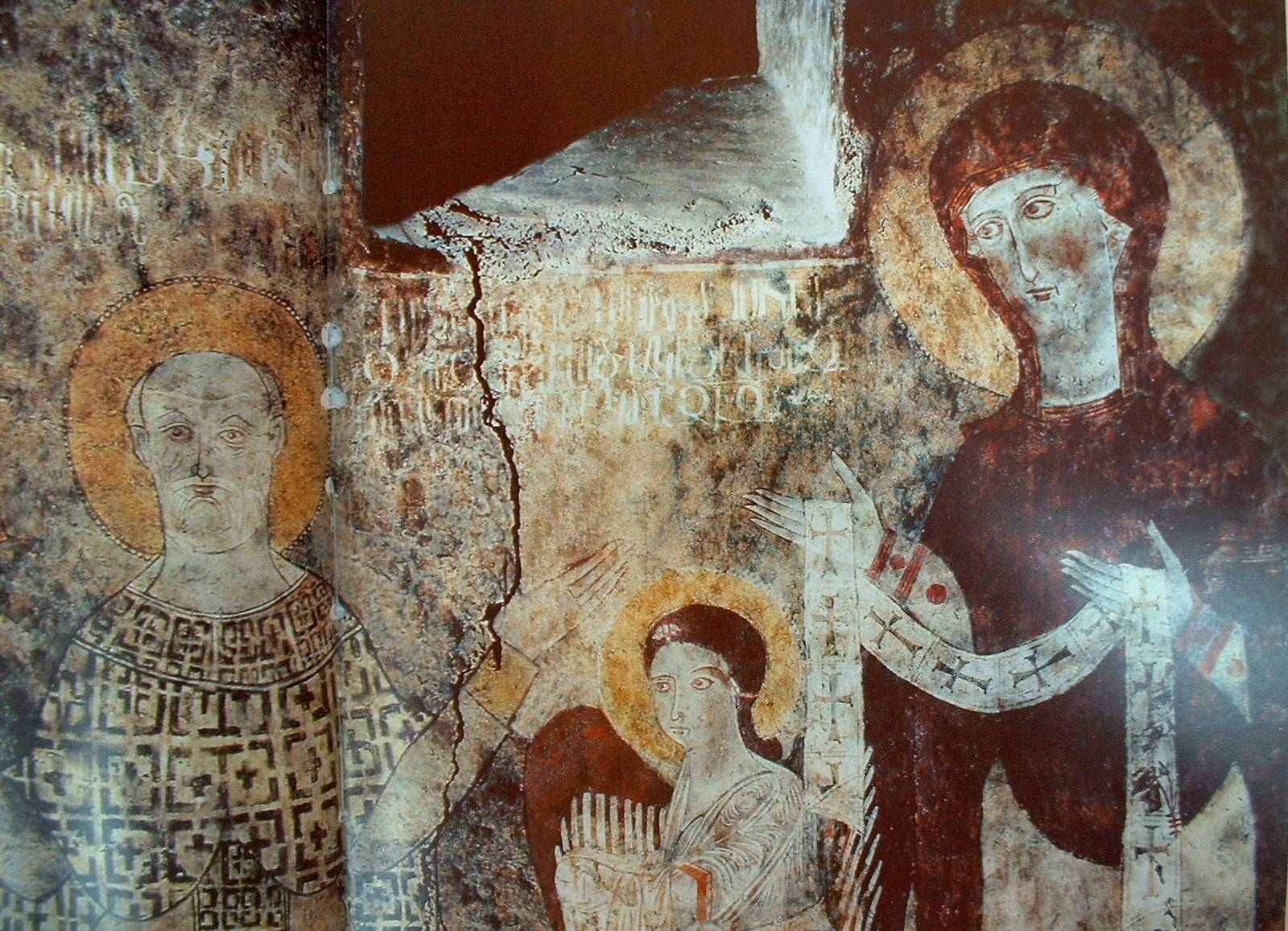
Fragment of a 13th-century fresco with Armenian inscribed text in Dadivank Monastery, a masterpiece of medieval culture of Artsakh

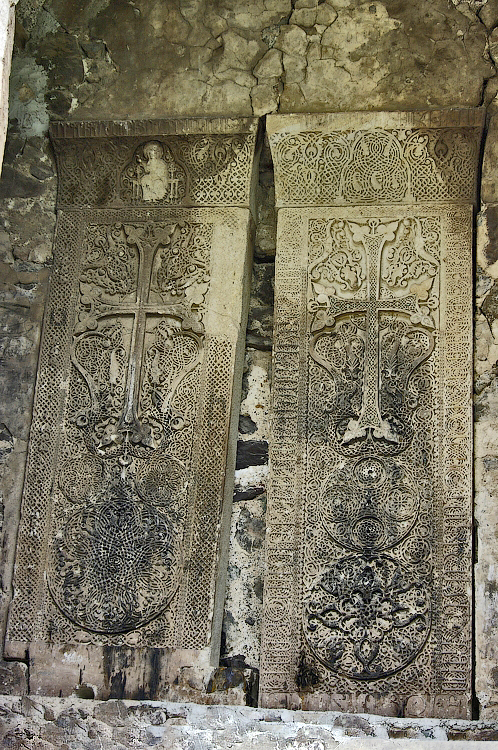
Khachkars at Dadivank

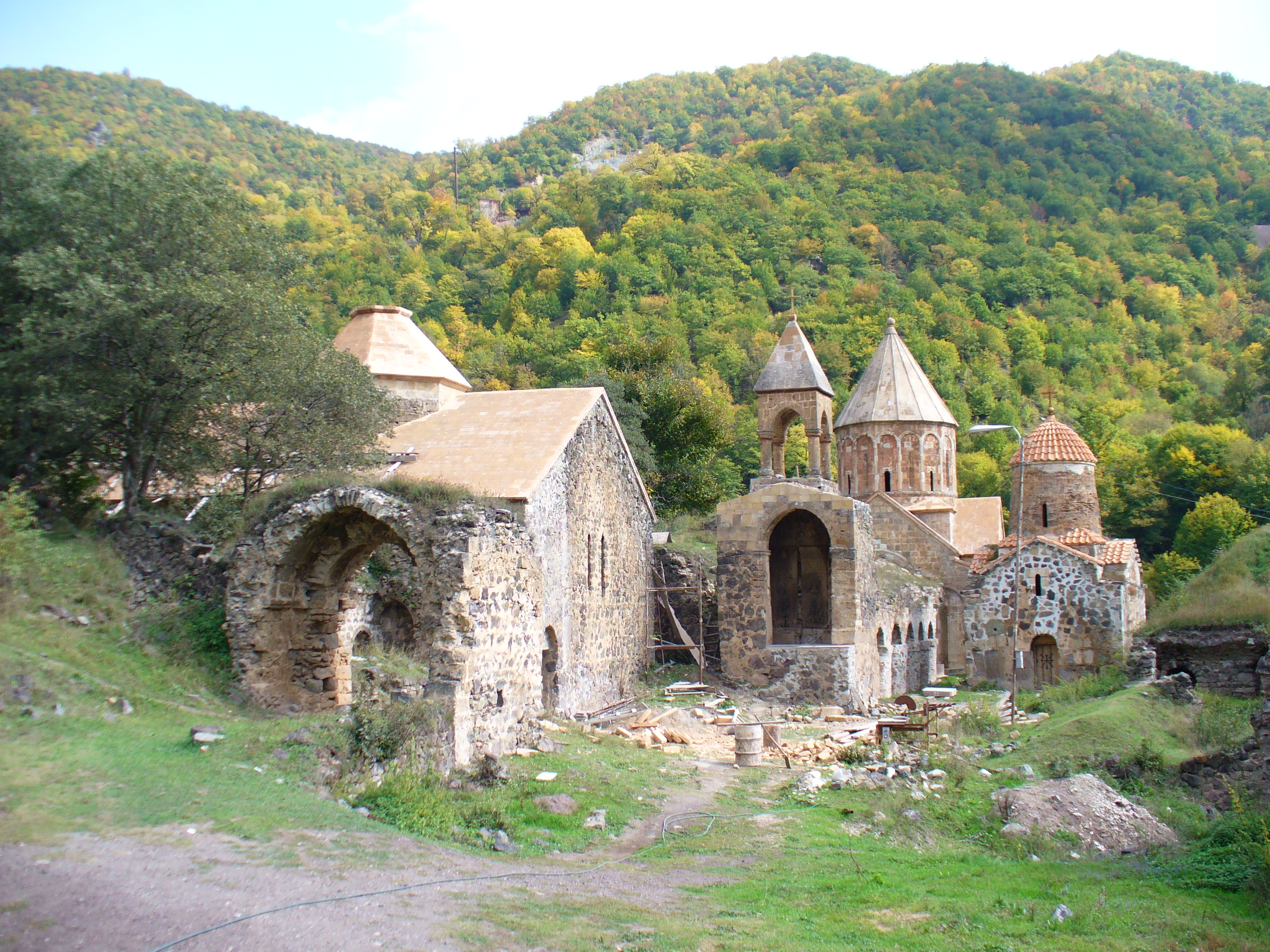
Side view

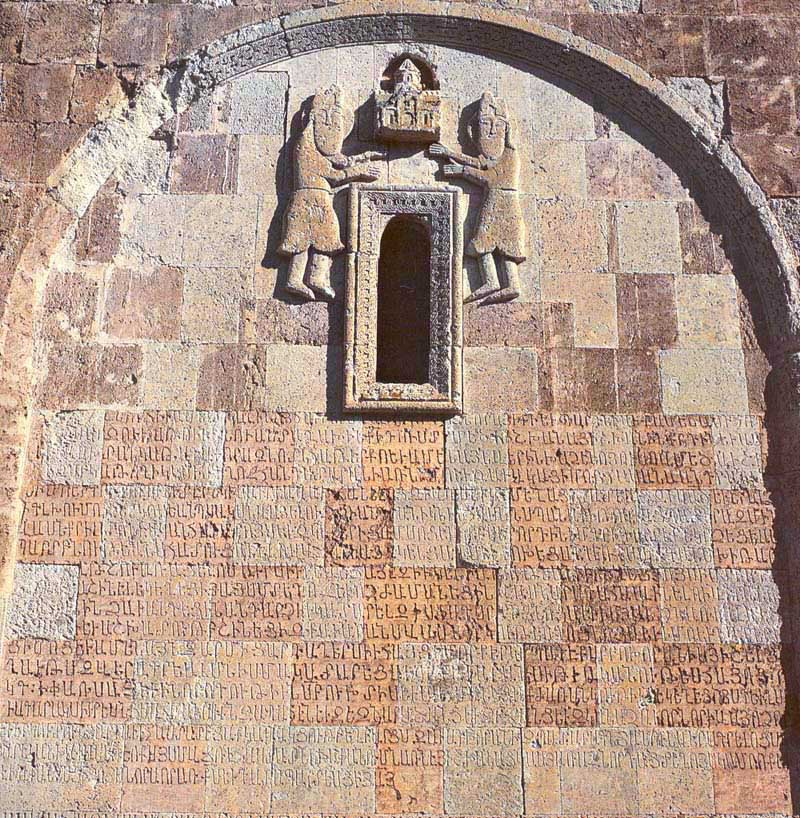
Armenian-inscribed text of Queen Arzu of Haterk, Dadivank Monastery (13th century)

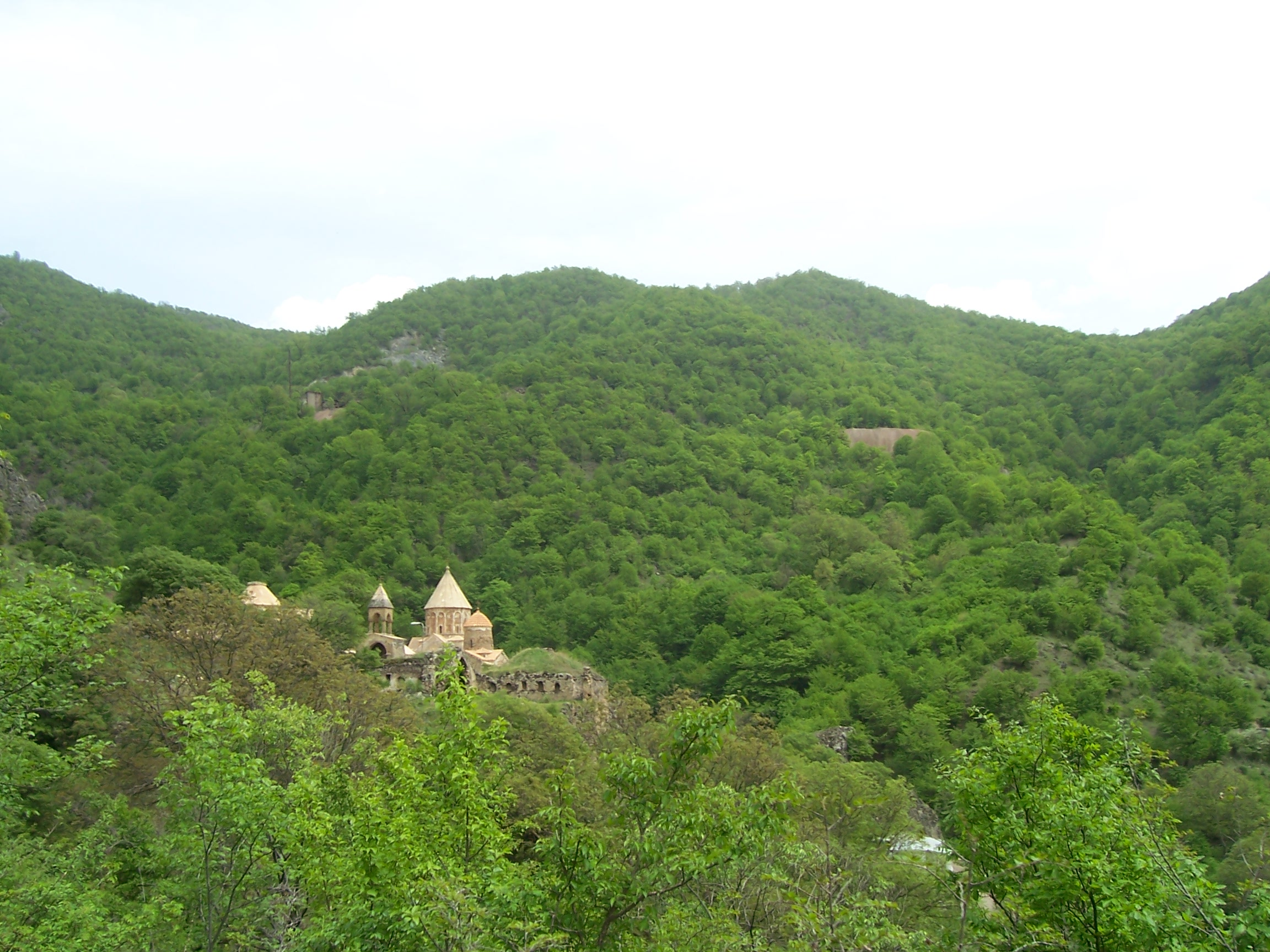
General view

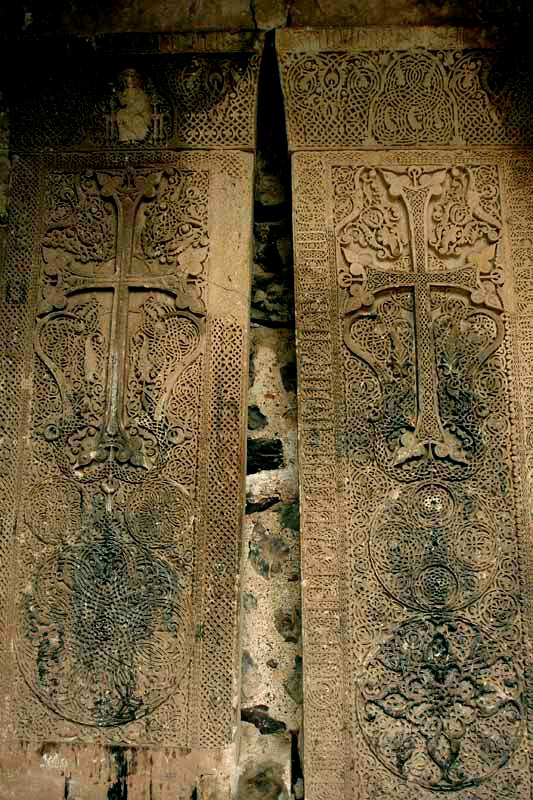
The 13th-century double khachkars of the memorial bell-tower of the Dadivank Monastery with their Armenian inscriptions

== See also ==
- Armenian architecture
- Armenian cultural heritage in Azerbaijan
- Christianity in Azerbaijan
- Culture of Artsakh
