= Vəng, Kalbajar =

Village in western Azerbaijan

Vəng
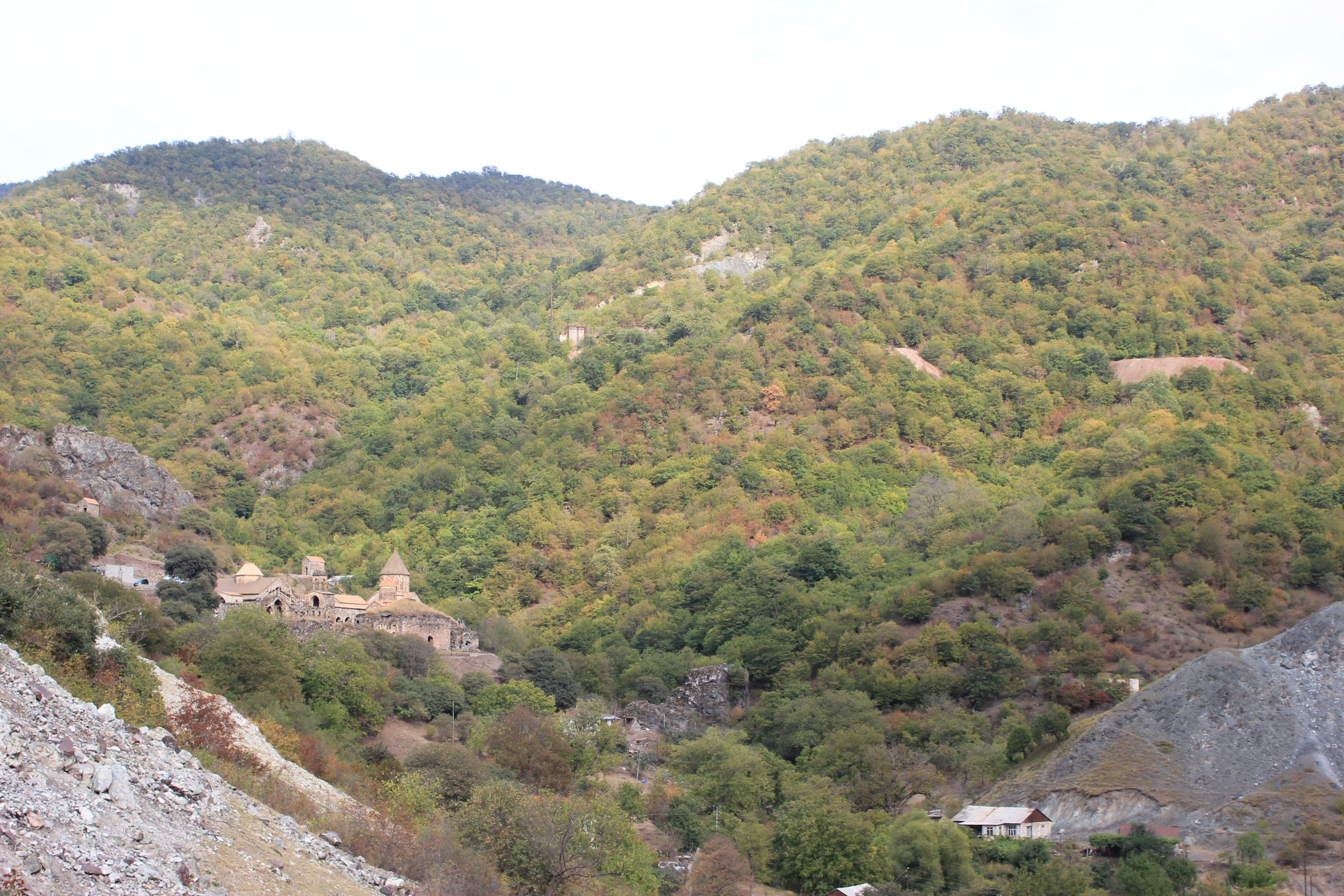
- Interactive map of Vəng
- Location within Azerbaijan Location within East Zangezur Economic Region
- Coordinates: 40°09′33.7″N 46°17′08.2″E
- Country: Azerbaijan
- District: Kalbajar

Population (2015)
  - Total: 136
- Time zone: UTC+4 (AZT)

Vang (Vəng) is a village in the Kalbajar District of Azerbaijan. The Dadivank monastery is located in the village.

== History ==
The village was located in the Armenian-occupied territories surrounding Nagorno-Karabakh, coming under the control of ethnic Armenian forces during the First Nagorno-Karabakh War in the early 1990s. The village subsequently became part of the breakaway Republic of Artsakh as part of its Shahumyan Province, referred to as Dadivank (Armenian: Դադիվանք). It was returned to Azerbaijan as part of the 2020 Nagorno-Karabakh ceasefire agreement. After the withdrawal of Armenian forces from the region, the Dadivank monastery in the village was placed under the protection of Russian peacekeeping forces.

== Historical heritage sites ==
Historical heritage sites in and around the village include the monastery of Dadivank (Դադիվանք) from between the 4th and 13th centuries, khachkars from between the 11th and 13th centuries, a winepress, chapel and fresco from the 13th century, and the 14th-century monument of St. Dadi (Armenian: Սուրբ Դադի, romanized: Surb Dadi).

== Demographics ==
The village had 94 inhabitants in 2005 and 136 inhabitants in 2015.

== Gallery ==
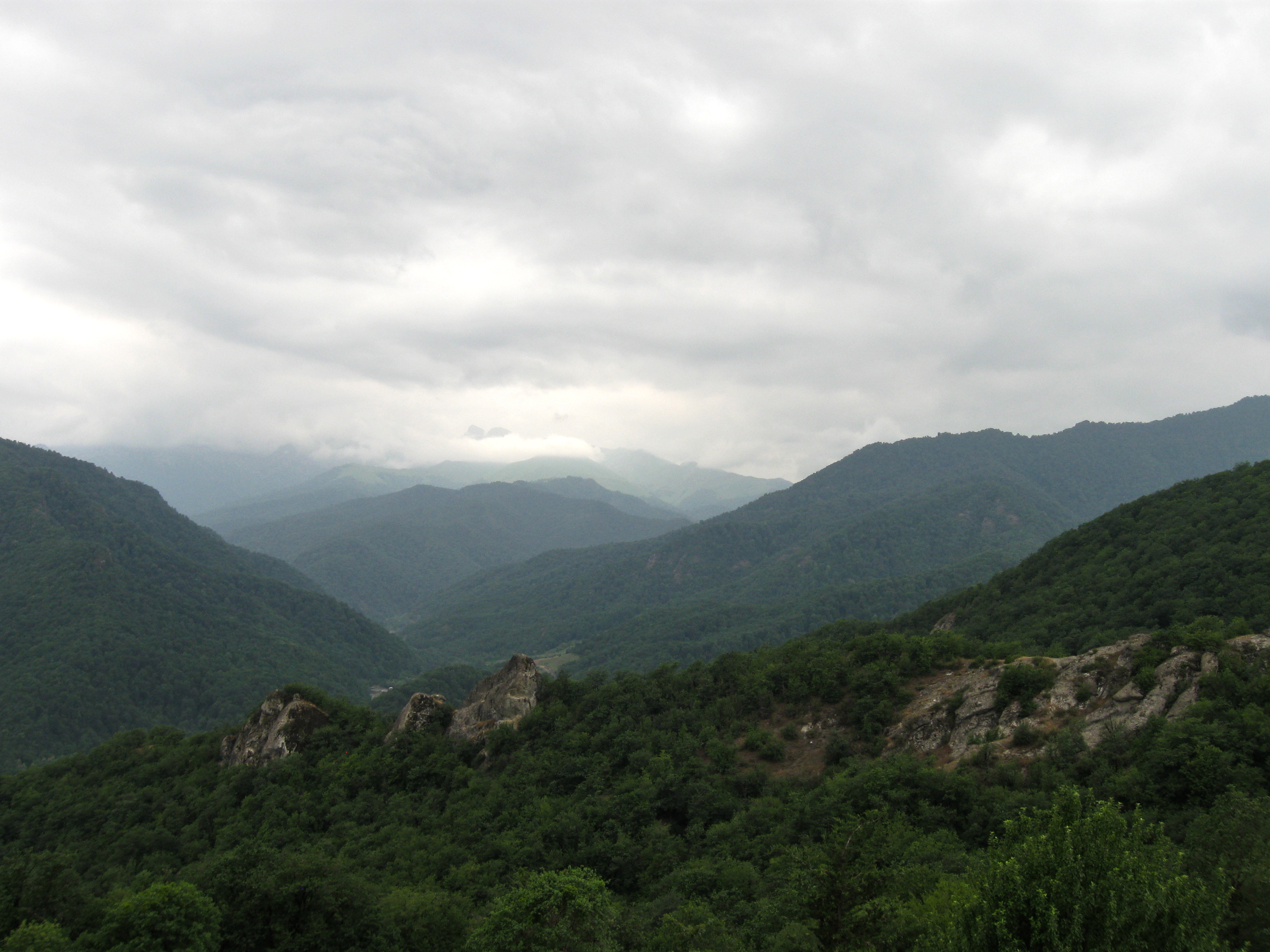
Mountains

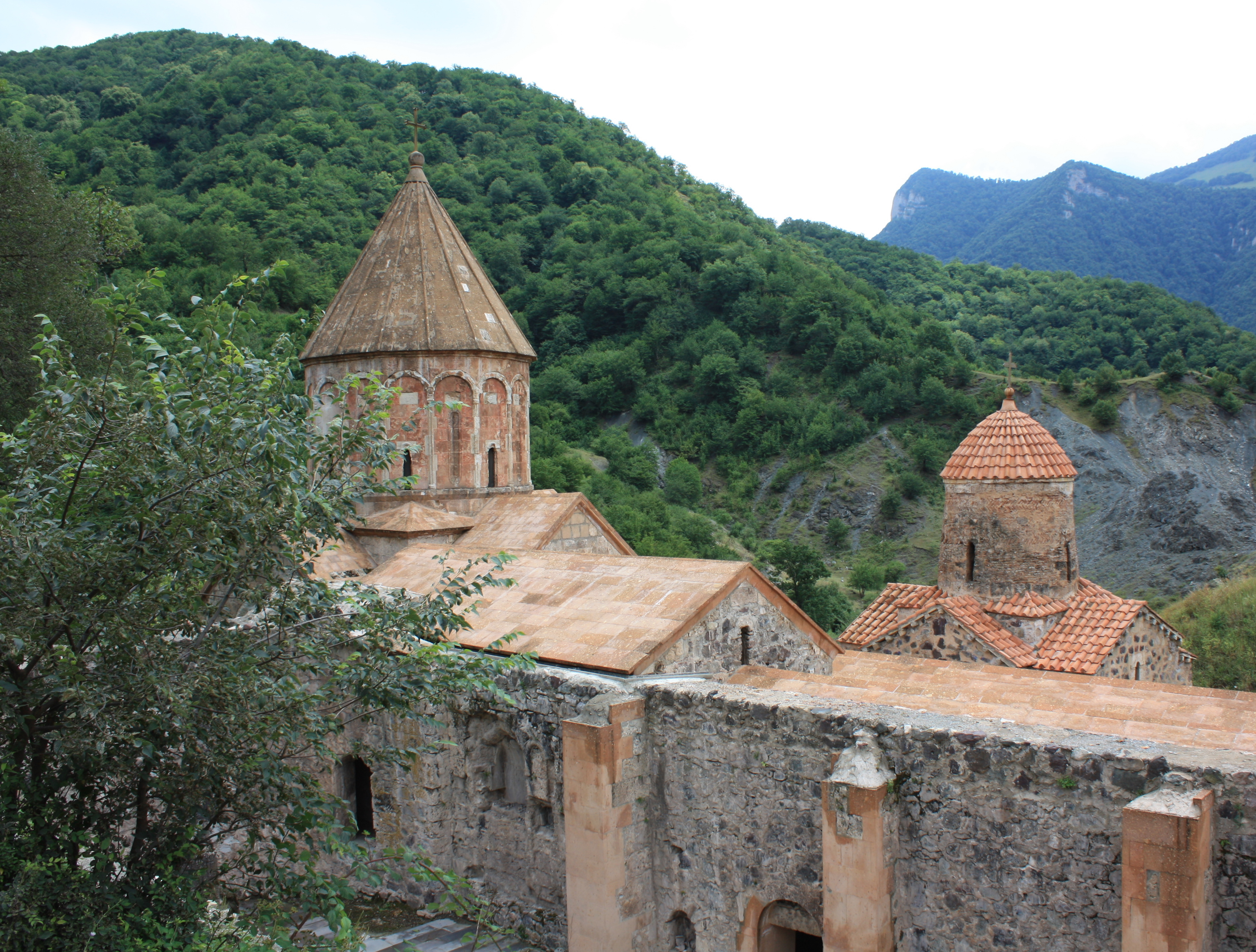
Dadivank monastery

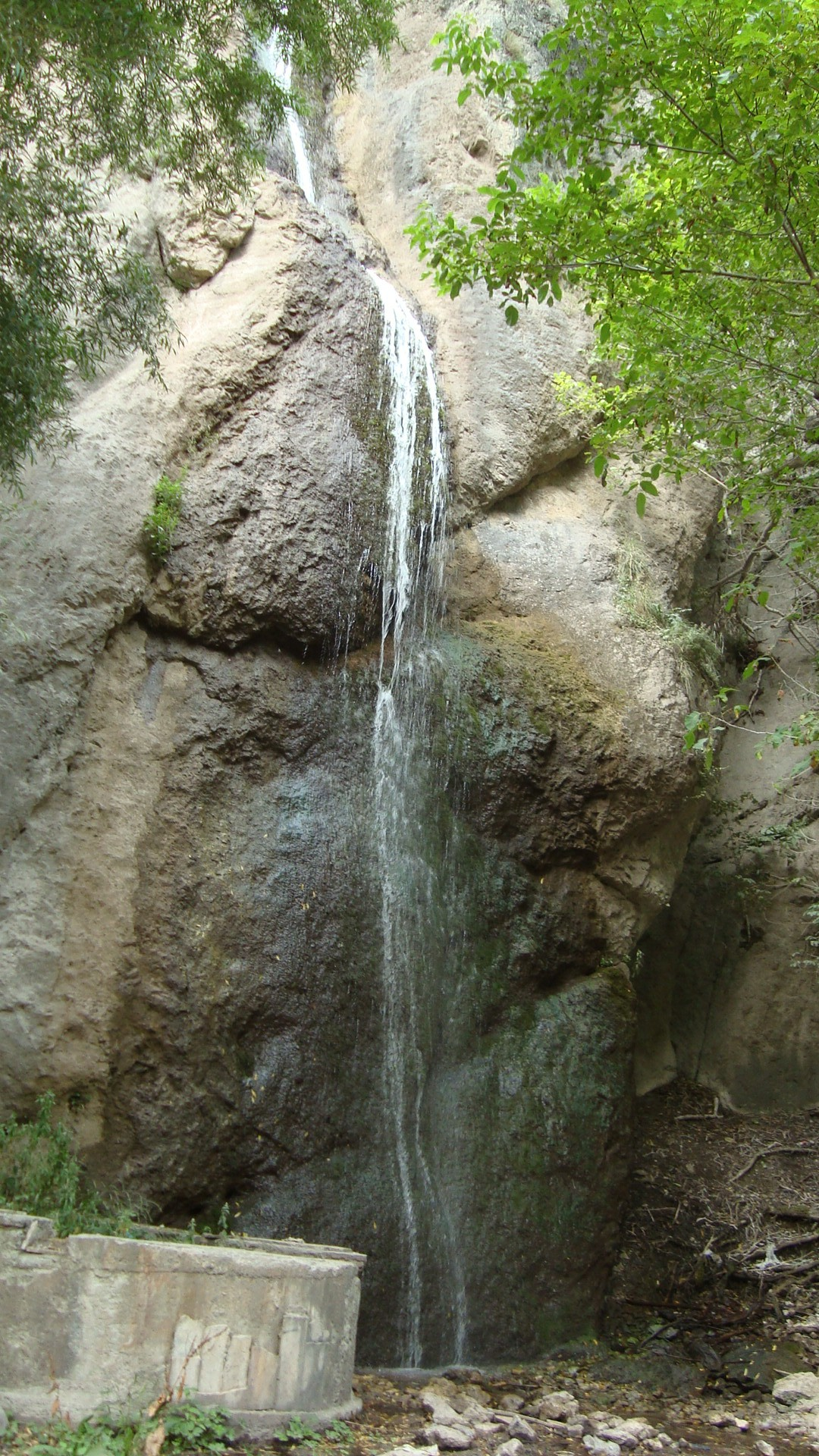
Waterfall

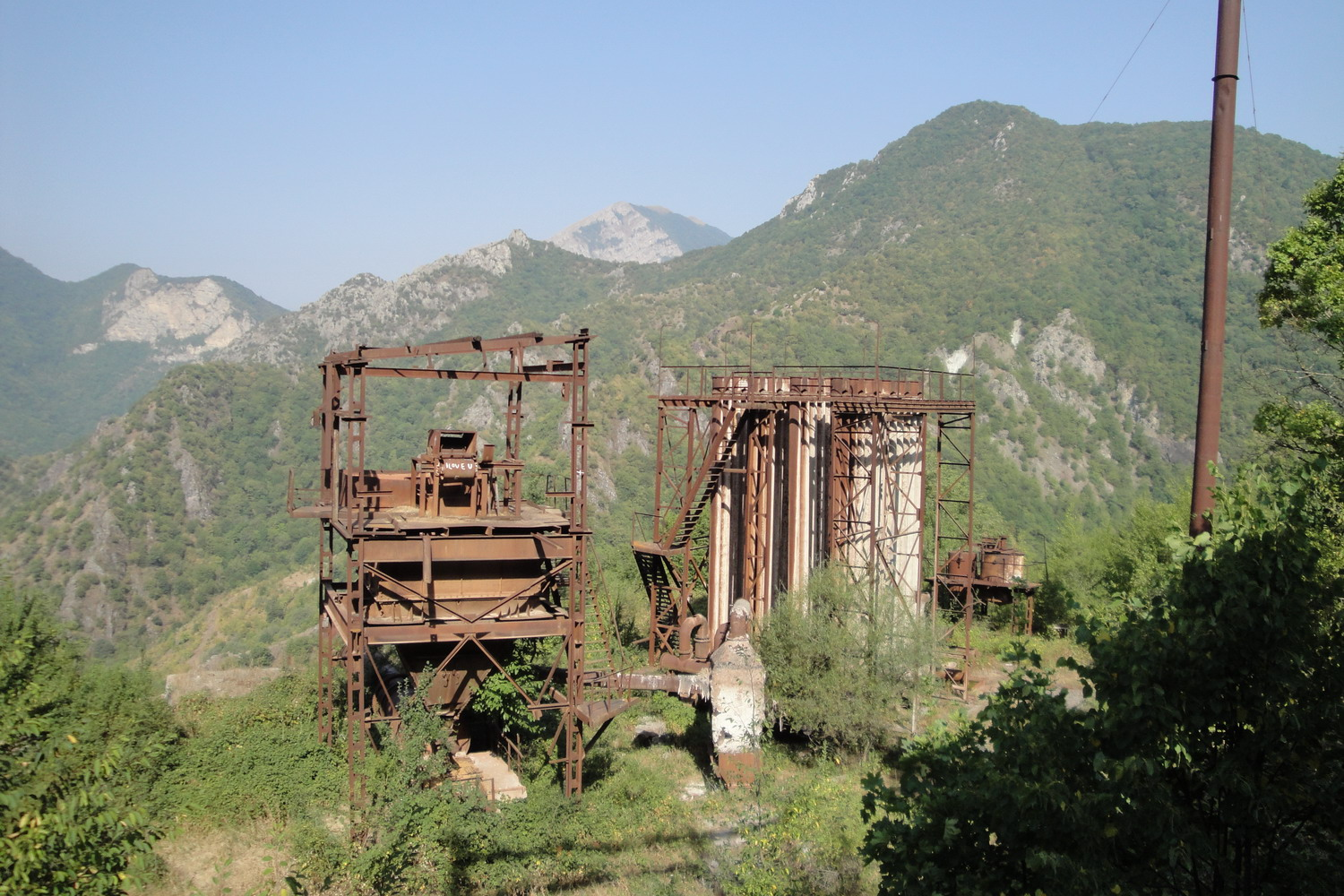
Abandoned factory

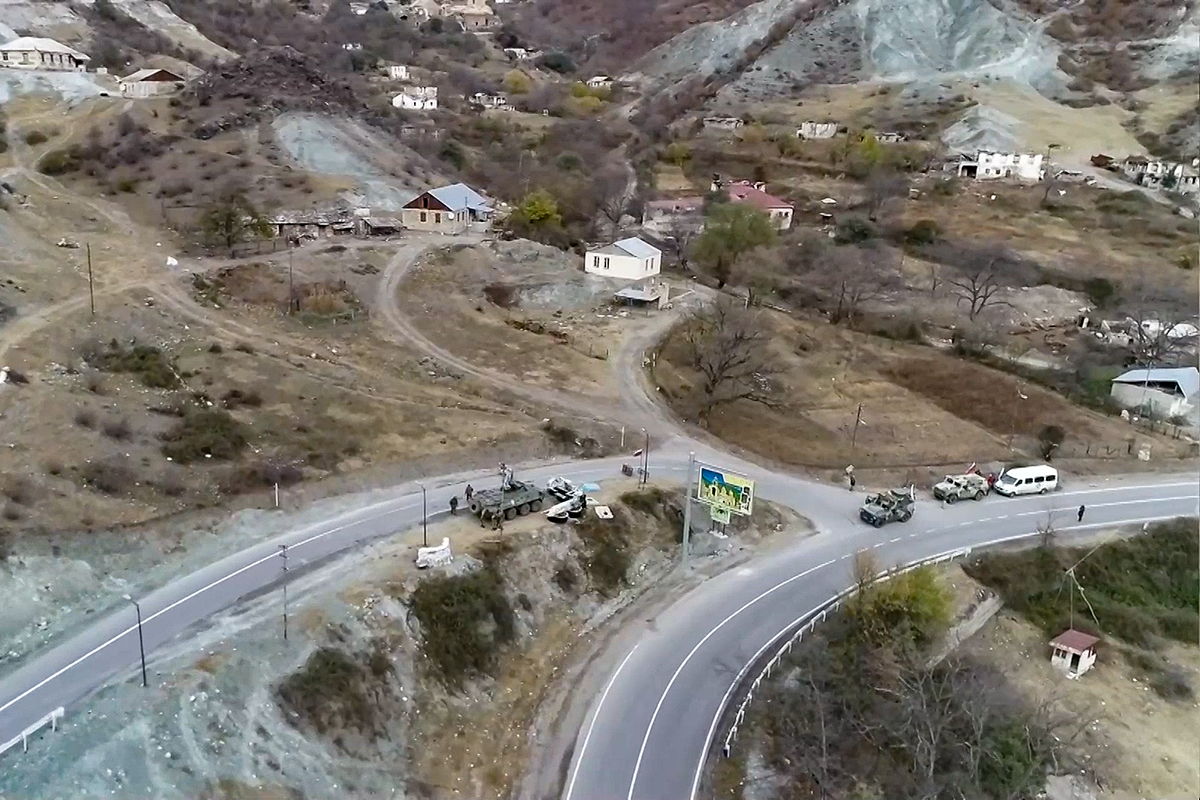
Checkpoint of Russian peacekeepers
