= Vank, Armenia =

Vank
- Location within Armenia Location within Syunik Province
- Coordinates: 39°02′54″N 46°15′04″E
- Country: Armenia
- Marz (Province): Syunik
- Time zone: UTC+4 ( )
  - Summer (DST): UTC+5 ( )

Vank (Armenian: Վանք) is a village in the Syunik Province of Armenia.
