= Gtichavank =

Armenian monastery on a mountainside

- Գտչավանք
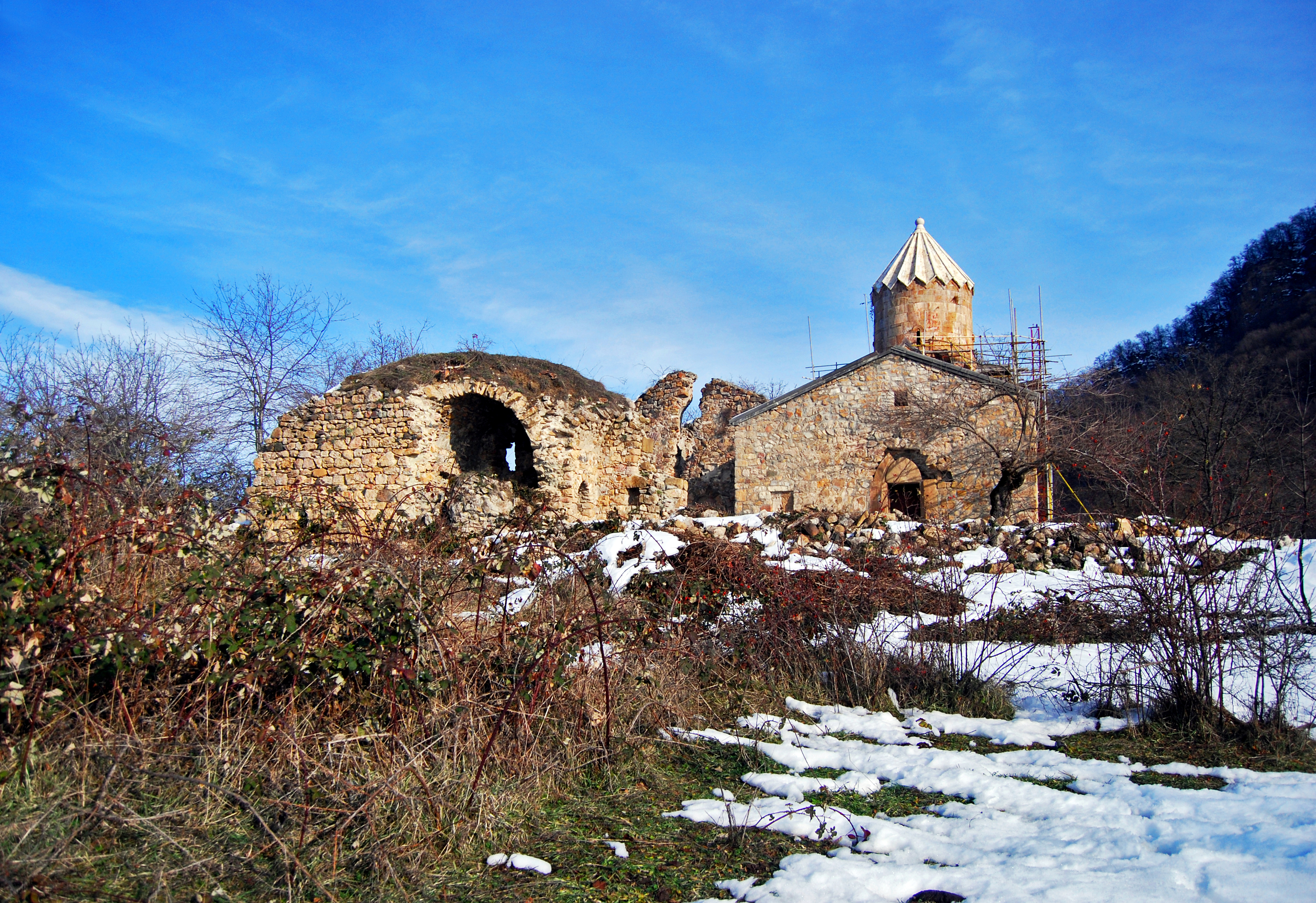

- Location within Azerbaijan

Religion
- Affiliation: Armenian Apostolic Church

Location
- Location: Togh, Nagorno-Karabakh, Azerbaijan
- Coordinates: 39.593547°N 46.941944°E

Architecture
- Style: Armenian
- Groundbreaking: 1241
- Completed: 1246

Gtichavank or Gtchavank (Armenian: Գտչավանք, romanized: Gtch’avank’; Azerbaijani: Ktişvəng or Gütəvəng) is a 13th-century Armenian Apostolic monastery, located near the village of Togh (or Tugh) in the region of Nagorno-Karabakh, Azerbaijan.

== Description ==
Gtichavank is located on the northern slope of the mountain known as Toghasar or Chgnavor in Armenian, 1.8 kilometers (1.1 mi) northwest of the village of Tugh (or Togh). It consists of two adjacent churches, a gavit’ (narthex) and living quarters. The main church has twin buttresses and a domed main hall, with a single entrance on the western side. It is made of felsite stones hewn to smoothness. Its dome is cylindrical and has a spire on top of it. It has a semi-circular raised chancel altar area with sacristies on either side.

The second, single-nave church, located to the north of the main church, is made of hewn, unsmooth basalt stones. It has a rectangular vaulted prayer hall with its entrance on the northeastern side. Its rectangular altar area is located on the eastern side of the structure. Its dual sacristies are located under the floor of the chancel, which is unusual in Armenian architecture. Its roof is collapsed and the side walls are damaged.

The gavit’ attached to the churches has a gable roof and is made of rough basalt stones like the second church. It contains a khachkar raised by Bishop Vrtanes, one of the builders of the main church. A second khachkar is now kept at Etchmiadzin. The gavit’ also served as a mausoleum for Armenian nobles. Traces of an older church are discernible next to the gavit’. The remains of living quarters and a defensive wall are visible to the west of the churches and gavit’. A mostly ruined cemetery with some fallen khachkars surrounds the monastery.

== History ==
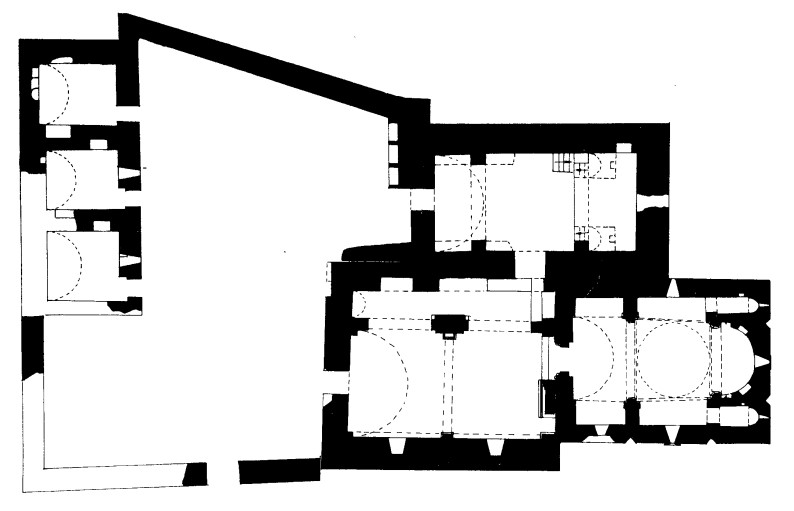
Plan of Gtichavank

Gtichavank is mentioned as the seat of a bishop starting in the 5th century. A representative from Gtichavank participated in the Armenian church council in Partaw (modern-day Barda) in 704. After the late 8th century, the monastery enjoyed the patronage of the local rulers of Dizak, who belonged to a branch of the Aranshahik dynasty. The Armenian ruler Esayi Abu-Muse had his seat at the fortress of Gtich or Ktish not far from the monastery. The primary church of the monastery was built in 1241–46 by two brothers, the bishops Sargis and Vrtanes of Amaras Monastery, as is recorded on an inscription on the northern wall of the monastery. Sargis and Vrtanes also granted the monastery extensive lands.

Gtichavank prospered in the 12th–14th centuries. In the 15th century, Gtichavank had a scriptorium; a few of the manuscripts written there have survived to the present day. It also flourished under the meliks of Dizak, particularly during the reign of Melik Yegan, who ruled over the region in the first half of the eighteenth century. In 1723, an abbot of Gtichavank was appointed at Meilk Yegan's request. In the 19th century, the abbot of the monastery was Vardapet Arakel Kostandyants, who wrote a historical work about the meliks of Karabakh which was used as a source for Raffi's study The Melikdoms of Khamsa.

The monastery has been renovated at different times. In 1717, the dome of the main church was repaired by an inhabitant of Tugh. It was especially damaged during an earthquake in 1868. The main, domed church was damaged, and the single-nave church was destroyed. After this, Gtichavank was abandoned. During the Soviet era, the main church and the gavit’ were mostly intact, although the roofs were damaged. Many visitors wrote on the interior and exterior of the complex using coal and paint. The monastery came under the control of the breakaway Republic of Artsakh in the First Nagorno-Karabakh War. In 2005–2007, restoration work was carried out at Gtchavank according to architect Mary Danielyan's plan. It was captured by Azerbaijan during the 2020 Nagorno-Karabakh war.

== Janapar Trail ==
The remains of the monastery is reachable to hikers via the Janapar Trail, a long-distance trail from Vardenis in Armenia to Hadrut in Artsakh. Another trail leading to this monastery is the Gtichavank Loop Trail starting in the village of Togh. In 2018, the trail was cleared of overgrown vegetation and was marked with red and white painted blazes by the Trails For Change NGO. From the monastery, it's possible to continue down the Gtichavank Loop Trail or to take the Janapar Trail down to Togh. From the monastery, it's possible to take either the unmarked trail behind the monastery back to Togh or the Janapar Trail.

== Gallery ==
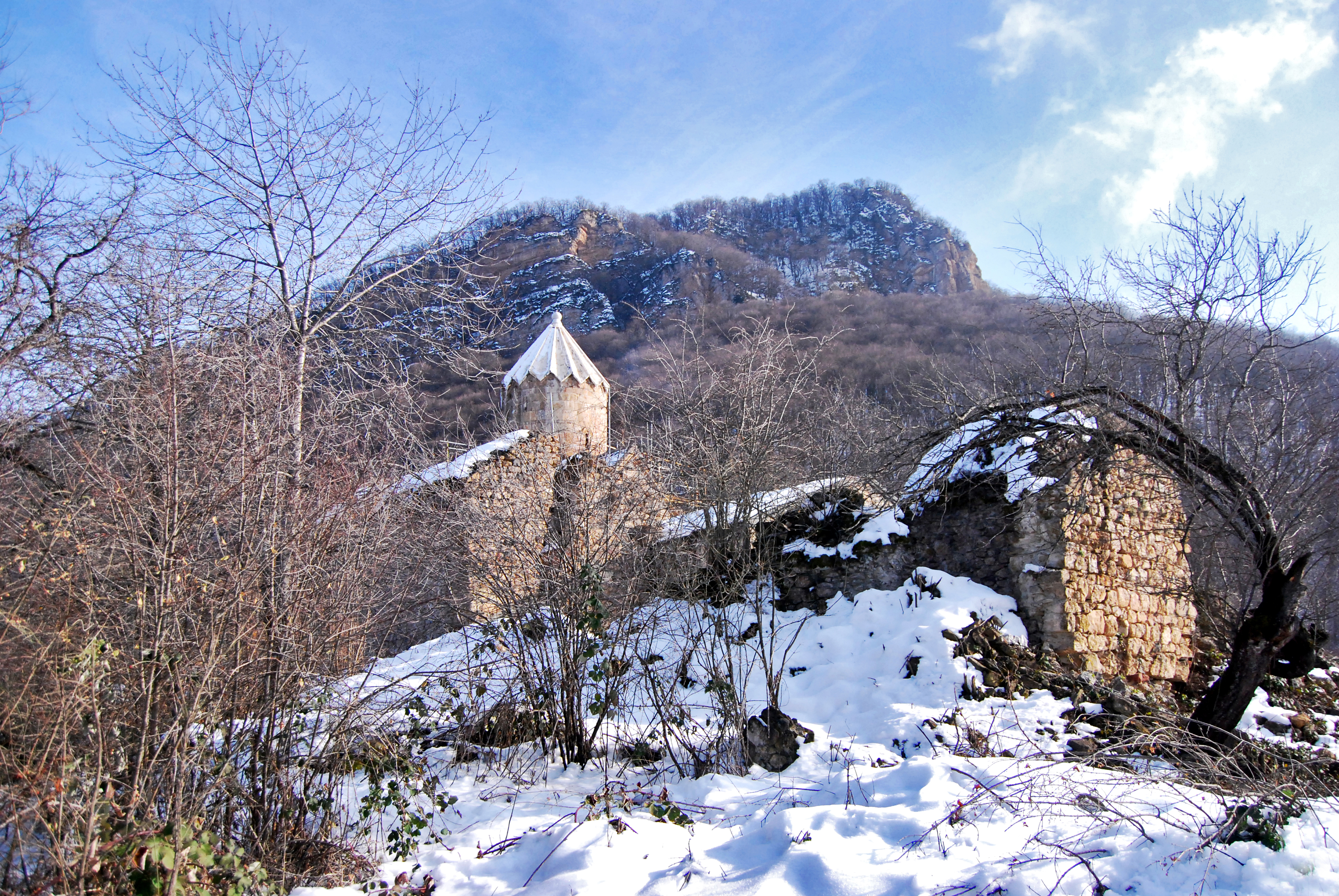

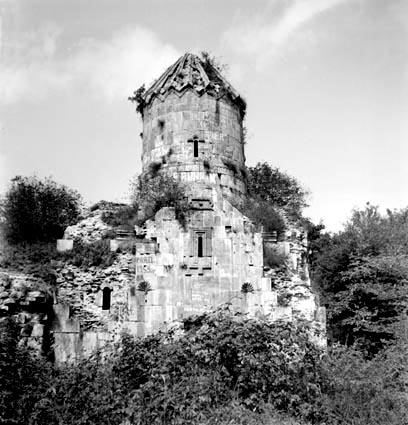

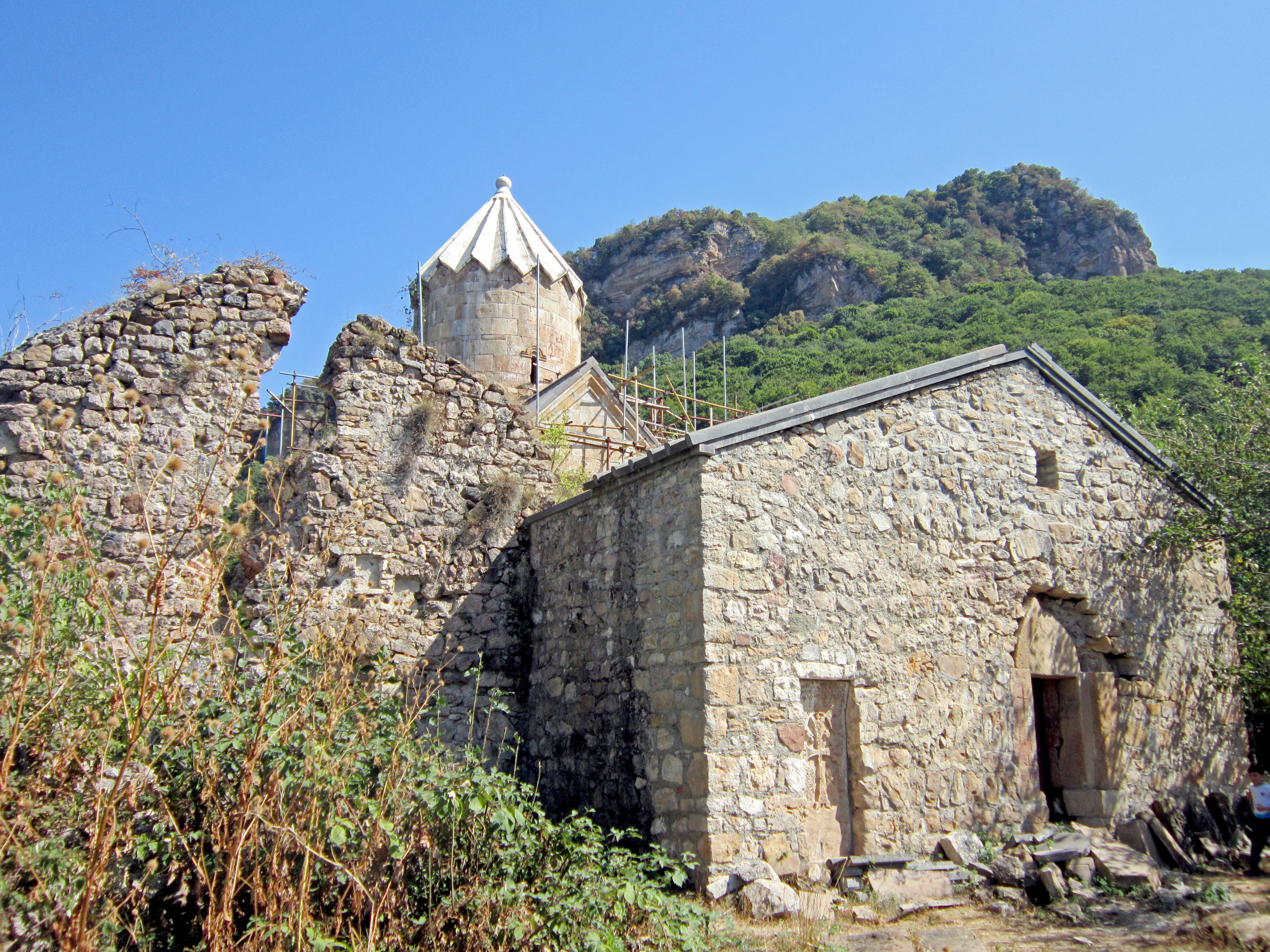

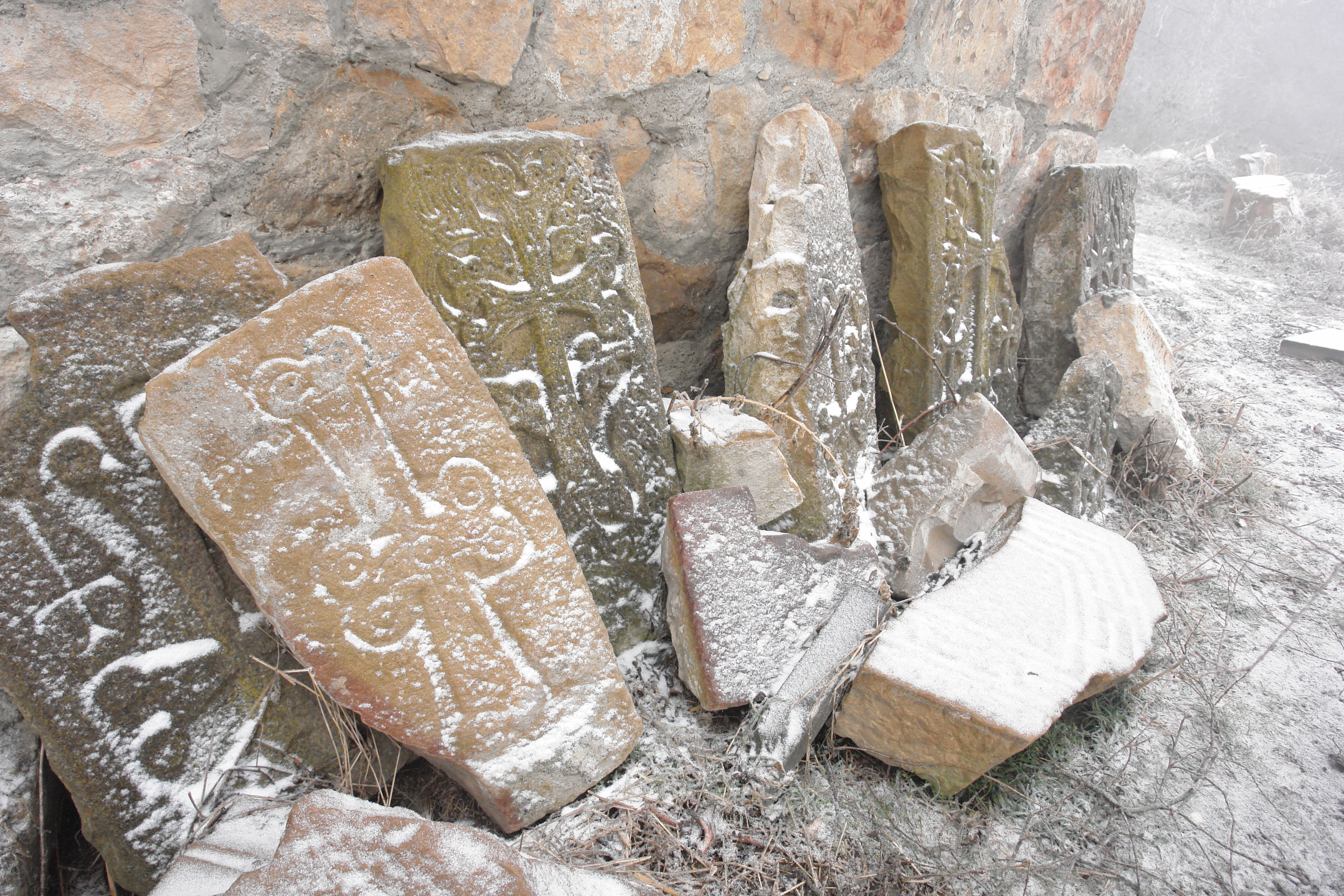

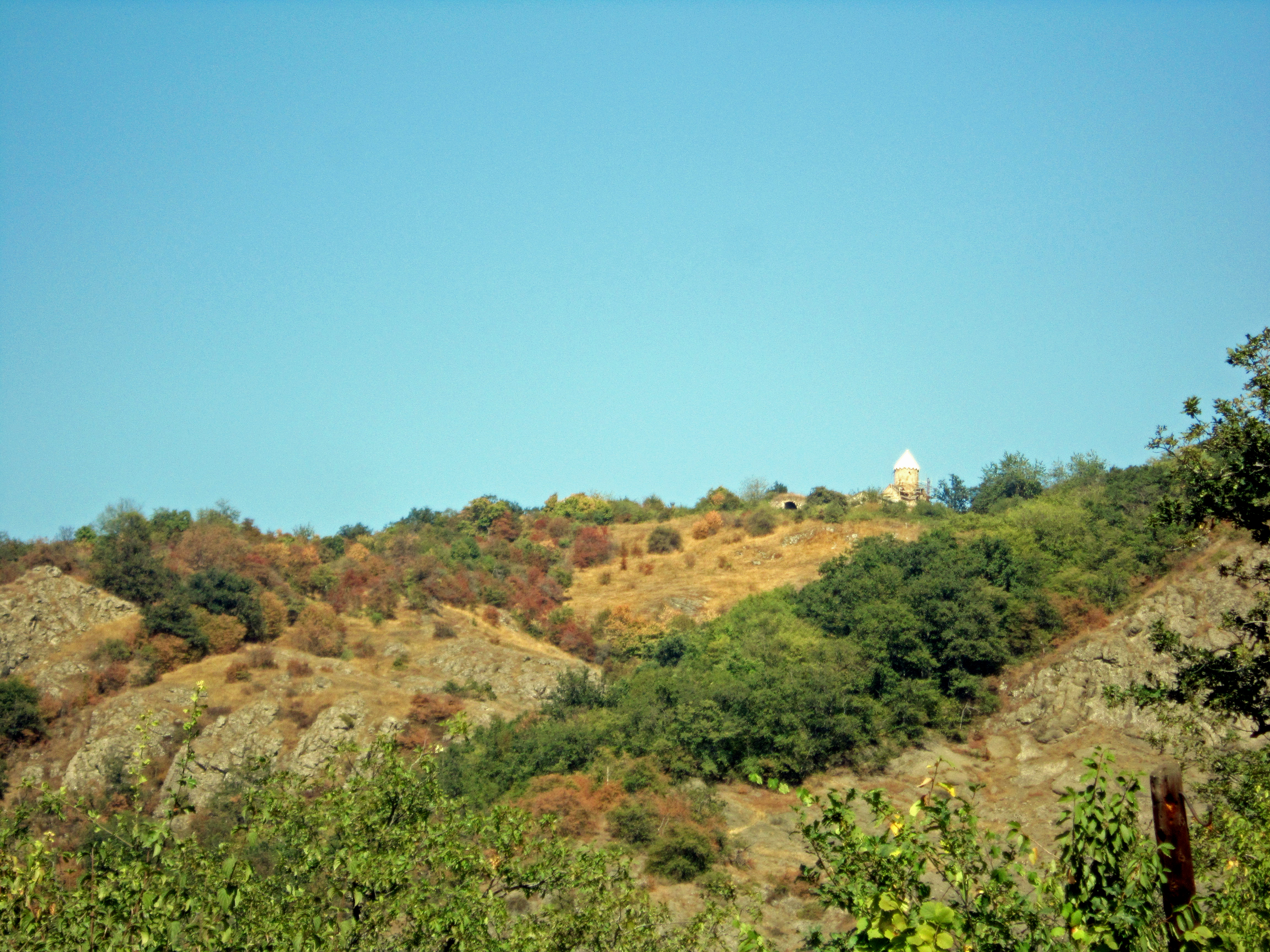

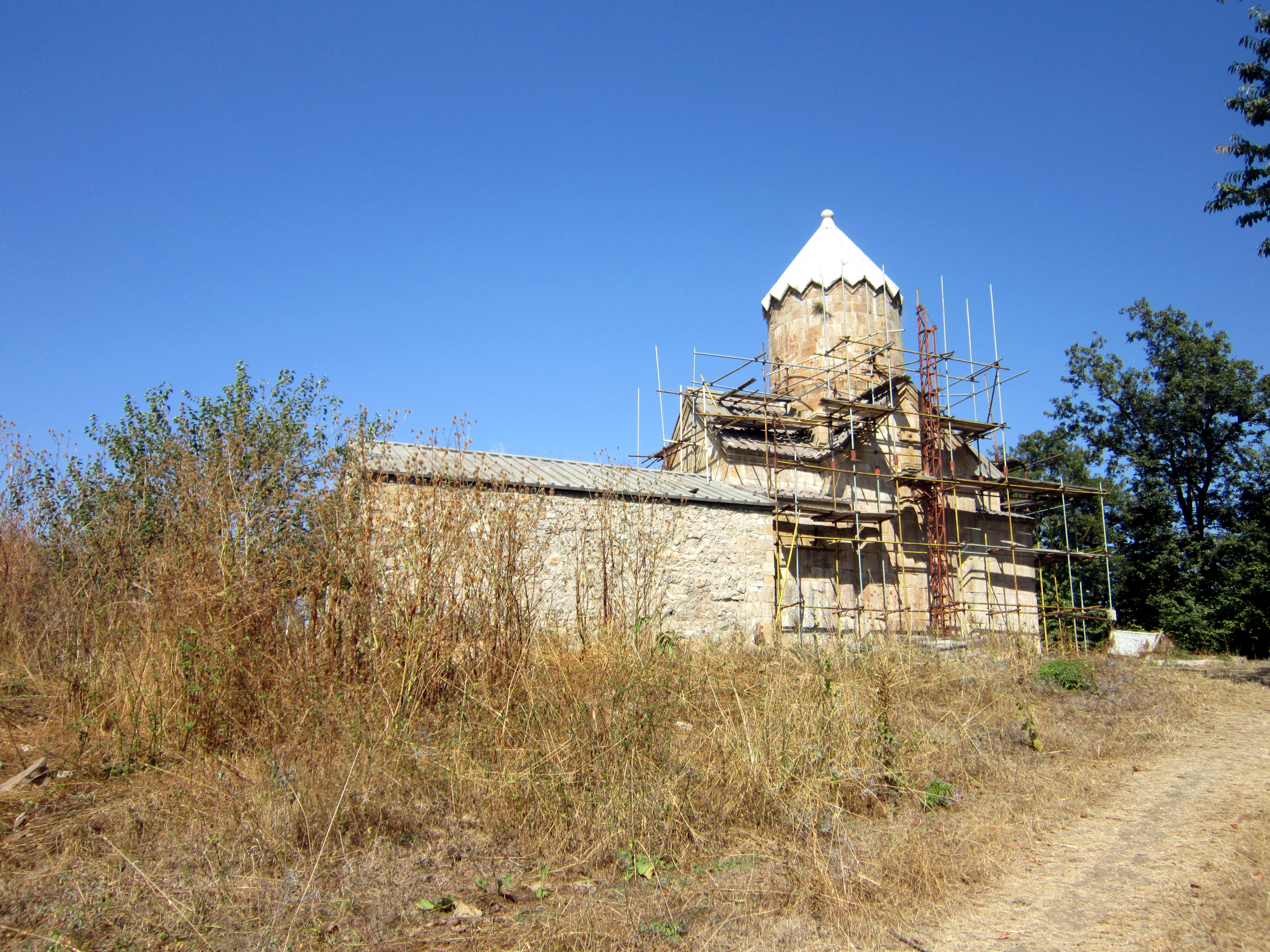

== See also ==
- Culture of Artsakh
- Architecture of Azerbaijan
