= Mir Mehdi Khazani =

Azerbaijani historian, poet and teacher

- Born: c. 1819 Məmər village, Bargyushad district of the Karabakh khanate
- Died: 1894 (aged 74–75) Tugh village, Zangezur uezd, Elizavetpol Governorate of the Russian Empire
- Notable works: Kitabi-tarihi-Garabag (The Book of the History of Karabakh)
- Children: Hamza

Mir Mehdi Khazani (c. 1819—1894) was an Azerbaijani historian, poet and teacher.

== Biography ==
Mir Mehdi was born in about 1819 in the village of Məmər of the Bargyushad mahal (district) of the Karabakh Khanate in the family of Mir Hashim Bey. He received his primary education in a madrasa. In his research, N. Guliyev, who studied the life and work of Mir Mehdi Khazani, reports that he moved to the village of Shykhymly in Karabakh in 1830, to Ganja in 1838, was engaged in teaching there, returned to Shykhymly again at the invitation of Molla Refi bey, and finally at the invitation of his son-in-law he moved to the village of Tugh in Dizak (Karabakh) in 1859.

Here he continued his teaching activities. Mir Mehdi Khazani in love with his language, wrote a work for children in the Azerbaijani language, which tells about the dogmas of Islam. This work was published in 1884.

His main work as a historian is the work “Kitabi-tarihi-Garabag” (The Book of the History of Karabakh) written after 1870. Mir Mehdi also became famous as a poet. He wrote poetry under the pseudonym Khazani.

He died in the village of Tugh in 1894 leaving one son named Hamza.

== Bibliography ==
In 1989, his works were published in book form. A few years ago, the manuscript of Mir Mehdi Khazani's collection of poems entitled "Collection of Imagination" was received at the Institute of Manuscripts named after M. Fizuli of the Azerbaijan National Academy of Sciences.
