= Mollu =

Mollu may refer to:

- Aşağı Mollu, Azerbaijan
- Yuxarı Mollu, Azerbaijan
