= Qaçaq Nəbi =

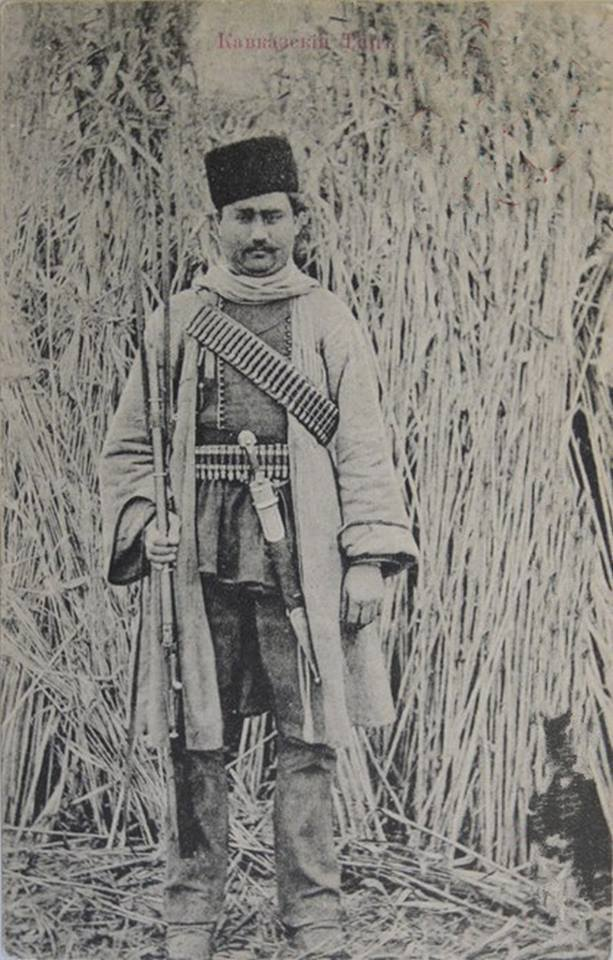
Gachaq Nabi

Gachaq Nabi (1854 – 1896) was an Azerbaijani gachaq (outlaw) from Ashaghi Mollu in the Qubadli District. He was actively involved in the Gachaq Movement in Azerbaijan during the latter half of the 19th century.

== Life ==
Gachaq Nabi was born in 1854 in the village of Ashaghi Mollu in the Zangezur District, now part of the Qubadli District. Sources vary on his ethnic background. In March 1896, while returning from Karbala, Nabi was ambushed by Russian spies in the village of Larni, situated near the border between Turkey and Iran.

Nabi was married to Hajar Khanum from Yukhari Mollu village. Both Hajar Khanum and her sister-in-law, Mehri Khanum, actively participated in the resistance alongside him.

Nabi's father, Ali, initially hired him out to a local landlord in Aşağı Mollu who sought to seize the peasants' land. Nabi opposed the landlord's actions and subsequently formed a group of local villagers to resist. They operated in the Nakhchivan and Zangezur districts, redistributing landowner property to the peasants. Hajar Khanum supported Nabi’s efforts throughout his resistance activities. On 12 March 1896, Nabi was betrayed and killed by two traitors.

== Sources ==
- Hacı Nərimanoğlu, "Elin bu günündə gələydin, Nəbi", Aydınlıq qəzeti, 1988.
- Hacı Nərimanoğlu, "Yaddaş", Gənclik jurnalı, May 1989.
- Hacı Nərimanoğlu, Qubadlısız 16 il, "Nurlan", 2009.
- Bəhlul Bəhcət, Qaçaq Nəbinin tarixi, (vəsiqə və sənədlər üzrə), Bakı, Çıraq, 2011, 288 səh
- "Qaçaq Nəbinin ölümündən 115 il ötür" məqaləsi, Bütöv Azərbaycan qəzeti. 16 March 2011. 9(97). p. 16.
- "Tarixi Xalq Qəhrəmanı – Qaçaq Nəbi" (in Azerbaijani). qubadli-ih.gov.az. Archived from the original on 2015-10-17.

== Footnotes ==
- "12 Mart Qaçaq Nəbının Ölüm Günüdür" (in Azerbaijani). mediaforum.az. 2011-03-11. Archived from the original on 2015-05-24.
- "Qaçaq Nəbı Haqqinda 1930-cu İllərdə Yazilmiș Tədqıqat İşiq Üzü Görüb" (in Azerbaijani). mediaforum.az. 2011-06-13. Archived from the original on 2015-05-24.
- Anar Tağıyev (2015-10-12). "Həcərin nəticəsi Publika.az-a danışdı: "Təəssüf ki, Qaçaq Nəbi ilə birlikdə illərlə döyüşmüş qadın..." - Fotolar" (in Azerbaijani). publika.az. Archived from the original on 2015-10-17.
