= Şıxımlı =

- Şıxımlı, Fuzuli, Azerbaijan
- Şıxımlı, Kurdamir, Azerbaijan
