= Aslan-bey Melik-Yeganyan =

Malik Aslan bey

Malik of Dizak
- Reign: 1805 – 1822
- Predecessor: Malik Abbas bey
- Successor: abolished
- Born: 1787; Tugh village, Dizak Principality, Karabakh Khanate
- Died: 1832
- Burial: Tugh village, Karabakh, Russian Empire
- Issue: sons: Shirin bey, Farhad bey, Aligulu bey, Firudin bey, Najaf bey, Abbas bey
- Dynasty: Avanids
- Father: Baghdad bey
- Religion: Islam

Malik Aslan bey (1787, Tugh—1832, Tugh) is the naib (deputy) of the Dizak region, the ancestor of the Malik-Aslanov family.

== Biography ==
He was born in 1787 the village of Tugh village of Dizak and was descended from the Avanid dynasty.

Malik Aslan bey's father Baghdad bey was converted to Islam. Under the son of the last Mehdigulu Khan (1806—1822), Malik Aslan bey served as minbashi (chief of troops).

Historian Mir Mehdi Khazani writes in his work Kitabi-tarikhi-Karabagh (History of Karabakh), "But later, during the era of the late Mehdigulu Khan and the state of Russia, Malik Aslan bey and his sons again found progress and became governors and viceroys of the districts. Sardar (commander) Paskevich spent some time with the army in Takhti-tavus in Karabakh, which is in the district of Dizak. Malik Aslan bey Dizaki has been very worthy in the service of sardar Paskevich since then. During his reign he prepared a lot of copper and supplies for the army, and satisfied the commander and the army".

Some villages in this region were also under his control. According to the inventories of 1823, 1832, 1848-1849, 1863, all the main members of the clan (meaning the descendants of Malik Aslan and his brothers) are shown among the beys.

Malik Aslan bey died in 1832 and was buried in the village of Tugh.

== Descendants ==
Malik Aslan bey's sons: Shirin bey (1803, Tugh–1863, Tugh), Hajji Farhad bey (15.06.1805, Tugh–1889, Tugh), Karbalai Aligulu bey (1810, Tugh–?), Firudin bey (15.06.1811, Tugh–27.05.1857, Tugh), Najaf bey (1816, Tugh–?), Hajji Abbas bey (1817, Tugh–1891, Tugh).

== Sources ==
- Anvar Chingizoglu. Məlik Yeqan və onun törəmələri. "Soy" elmi-kütləvi dərgi, 2011, № 3, pp. 23–34.
- State Historical Archive of the Republic of Azerbaijan (ГИААР).Ф.24.Оп. 1. Д. 142. pp. 205–207.
