= Avan-khan =

Melik of Dizak
- Died: 1744; Tugh village, Dizak Principality, Karabakh
- Wives: Khanoum-aga begum; Gohar Khanoum
- Issue: sons: Aram, Esayi, Altoukhan, Bakhtam-bey, Hovsep-bey, Bagr-bey, Arakel-bey, Safar-bey, Bagum-bey and Verdi-bey, daughters: Tavar-begum, Khan-Baji-begum, Khatun-begum and Hatay-begum
- Dynasty: Melik-Avanian
- Father: Lucas Vardapet
- Mother: Maryam
- Religion: Armenian Apostolic Church

Avan-khan III or Yegan (Armenian: Ավան խան or Մելիք Եգան) was the Armenian ruler of Dizak from 1716 to 1744 and the ancestor of Melik-Aslanyan and Melik-Yeganyan families.

== Origin ==
He was born in the village of Artu in the province of Lori in the family of vardapet Lukas from the Avanid dynasty. According to many authors Melik Avan III returned to Dizak from Lori with his father and family members after a quarrel with his relative Elizbar pertaining to some land.

Historian Mirza Adigozal bey writes: "One of these districts is Dizak. Its chieftain is called Melik Yegan. He escaped from Lori and during the reign of Nader Shah and by his command he sat on the throne of the chieftaincy and gained respect."

== Biography ==
Melik Avan moved to the village of Tugh in Dizak where he became a melik. Here his father restored the Gtich monastery. Avan erected a magnificent church in the village and fortified the settlement with circumferential walls. The Palace of Dizak Meliks he built in the same village decorated with Armenian inscriptions is still preserved today.

From 1722 to 1728, he participated in the liberation struggle of Armenians against foreign domination under the command of Davit Bek. The military talent of the ruler of the Principality of Dizak was noted by the Persian and Russian courts.

During the reign of Empress of Russia Anna Ioannovna he went with his retinue to Russia, where he met with a wonderful reception. The Russian tsarina for the services rendered by him to Peter the Great during the Persian campaigns granted melik Avan the rank of major general and various orders.

The Persian Shah Nader in 1736 appointed him khan and beylerbey of all the provinces of the Karabakh khanate. He was raised to the baronial dignity of the Holy Roman Empire by the Emperor of Austria under the name of Johann von Giovanni.

In 1741, Avan Khan at the invitation of Elizabeth of Russia attended the celebrations on the occasion of her coronation. At the festivities the khan negotiated and held a series of meetings with the queen and high-ranking officials of Russia.

After returning to his homeland in Dizak melik Avan-Khan did not live long. He died in 1744 and was buried in the tomb of the church of his fortress Tugh. An inscription on his tombstone reads:

Armenian

Այս է տապան քաջ իշխանին,
Եկան անուն մեծ Մելիքին,
Որ է որդի բարեպաշտին
Ղուկաս անուն վարդապետին․
Եղև սիրեցեալ ամենայնին
Նատիր անուն թագաւորին,
Տիրապետաց սայ ի երկրին
Ի Աղուանից ի նահանգին,
Յոյժ պատուեցաւ Պարսից ազգէն
Քան զիշխանս Հայոց երկրին․․․ ՌՃՂԳ [1744]

Transliteration

Ays ē tapan k῾aǰ išxanin,
Ekan anun mec Melik῾in,
Or ē ordi barepaštin
Łukas anun vardapetin․
Ełew sirec῾eal amenaynin
Natir anun t῾agaworin,
Tirapetac῾ say i erkrin
I Ałuanic῾ i nahangin,
Yoyž patuec῾aw Parsic῾ azgēn
K῾an zišxans Hayoc῾ erkrin․․․ ṘČŁG

English translation

This is the grave of the brave prince,
The great melik named Yegan,
Who was the son of the pious
Vardapet named Ghukas.
He was the most beloved
Of the king named Nader,
He ruled in the land
and province of Albania,
He was honored by the Persian nation
More than [all] the princes of Armenia... 1744

== Family ==
He had at least two wives. One of them was Armenian Khanum-aga begum, who is mentioned on the wall of the church of St. Hovhannes in the village of Tugh. Cyril Toumanoff mentions his wife Gohar-Khanum.

He had many sons: Aram, Esayi, Altoukhan, Bakhtam-bey, Hovsep-bey, Bagr-bey, Arakel-bey, Safar-bey, Bagum-bey, Verdi-bey, and 4 daughters: Tavar-begum, Khan-Baji-begum, Khatun-begum and Hatay-begum.

The first two sons successively inherited from their father the titles of meliks. Two other sons were forcibly held hostage at the Shah's court were converted to Islam and elevated in Iran to the rank of khan. The remaining sons and their families continued to live in Karabakh under various surnames.

== See also ==
- Dizak
- Esayi Abu-Muse
- Aslan-bey Melik-Yeganyan

== Sources ==
- Anvar Chiningizoglu. Məlik Yeqan və onun törəmələri. "Soy" elmi-kütləvi dərgi, 2011, №3, p. 23-34.
- Emïn, Joseph (1792). Life and Adventures of Emin Joseph Emin, 1726–1809. Baptist mission Press. pp. 339–341.
- Cyril Toumanoff. Manuel de généalogie et de chronologie pour l'histoire de la Caucasie chrétien (Arménie - Géorgie - Albanie). p. 258.
- Hewsen, Robert (1972). The Meliks Of Eastern Armenia I. p. 322.
- Maghalyan, Artak (2012). Art︠s︡akhskie melikstva i melikskie doma v XVII-XIX vv. Erevan. ISBN 978-9939-60-157-1. OCLC 855048091.
- Raffi; Melkonian, Ara Stepan (2010). The five melikdoms of Karabagh, (1600-1827). London: Taderon Press. ISBN 978-1-903656-57-0. OCLC 670483701.
