= Məmər =

Village in Azerbaijan

- Location within Azerbaijan Location within East Zangezur Economic Region
- Coordinates: 39°15′13.2″N 46°41′37.7″E
- Country: Azerbaijan
- District: Qubadli

Population (2015)
  - Total: 46
- Time zone: UTC+4 (AZT)

Məmər (Azerbaijani pronunciation: [mæˈmæɾ]) is a village in the Qubadli District of Azerbaijan. It is situated along the Vorotan river.

== History ==
Məmər was part of the Zangezur Uyezd of Elisabethpol Governorate during the Russian Empire. According to 1886 census data, there were 39 homes and 165 Azerbaijanis (classified as "Tatars" in the census) of the Shiite branch of Islam in Məmər. According to the 1912 "Caucasian Calendar", the village of Məmər was home to 291 people, the majority of whom were Azerbaijanis (classified as "Tatars" in the census).

Məmər was part of the Qəzyan village council in the Zangilan District of the Azerbaijan SSR during the early Soviet period in 1933. The village had 52 farms and a total population of 225 people. The population of the village council, which also included the villages of Aşağı Mollu, Hal, Yuxarı Mollu, Müskənli, Qəzyan, and Rəşidli, was 55.7 percent Azerbaijani and 43.9 percent Kurdish.

During the First Nagorno-Karabakh War in August 1993, Armenian forces occupied the village, forcing the Azerbaijani population to flee. It was later incorporated into the breakaway Republic of Artsakh as part of its Kashatagh Province, where it was known as Mamark (Armenian: Մամարք). Məmər was recaptured by Azerbaijan on 30 October 2020 during the 2020 Nagorno-Karabakh war.

== Historical heritage sites ==
The village is home to the 18th-century Mamar Mosque. The mosque was used as a warehouse during the Soviet era. After 1991, the mosque was reopened as a place of worship. Following the village's occupation, it was taken over by Armenian forces. During the occupation, the mosque was used as a pigsty, which drew criticism from Azerbaijani officials and the Organization of Islamic Cooperation, which stated that "the deliberate destruction and looting of material and spiritual artefacts, particularly the destroyed Mosque of the recently liberated Mamar village of Gubadly District as well as misappropriation and falsification of history are a clear evidence of a policy of aggression".

== Demographics ==
Year	Population	Ethnic composition	Source
1886	165	100% Tatars (i.e. Azerbaijanis)	Transcaucasian Statistical Committee
1912	291	Mostly Tatars	Caucasian Calendar
1933	225		Statistics of Azerbaijan SSR
August 1993: Occupation of Məmər. Expulsion of Azerbaijani population
2015	46	~100% Armenians	NKR estimate
