= Togh's Melikian Palace =

Togh’s Melikian Palace
- Armenian: Տողի մելիքական ապարանք
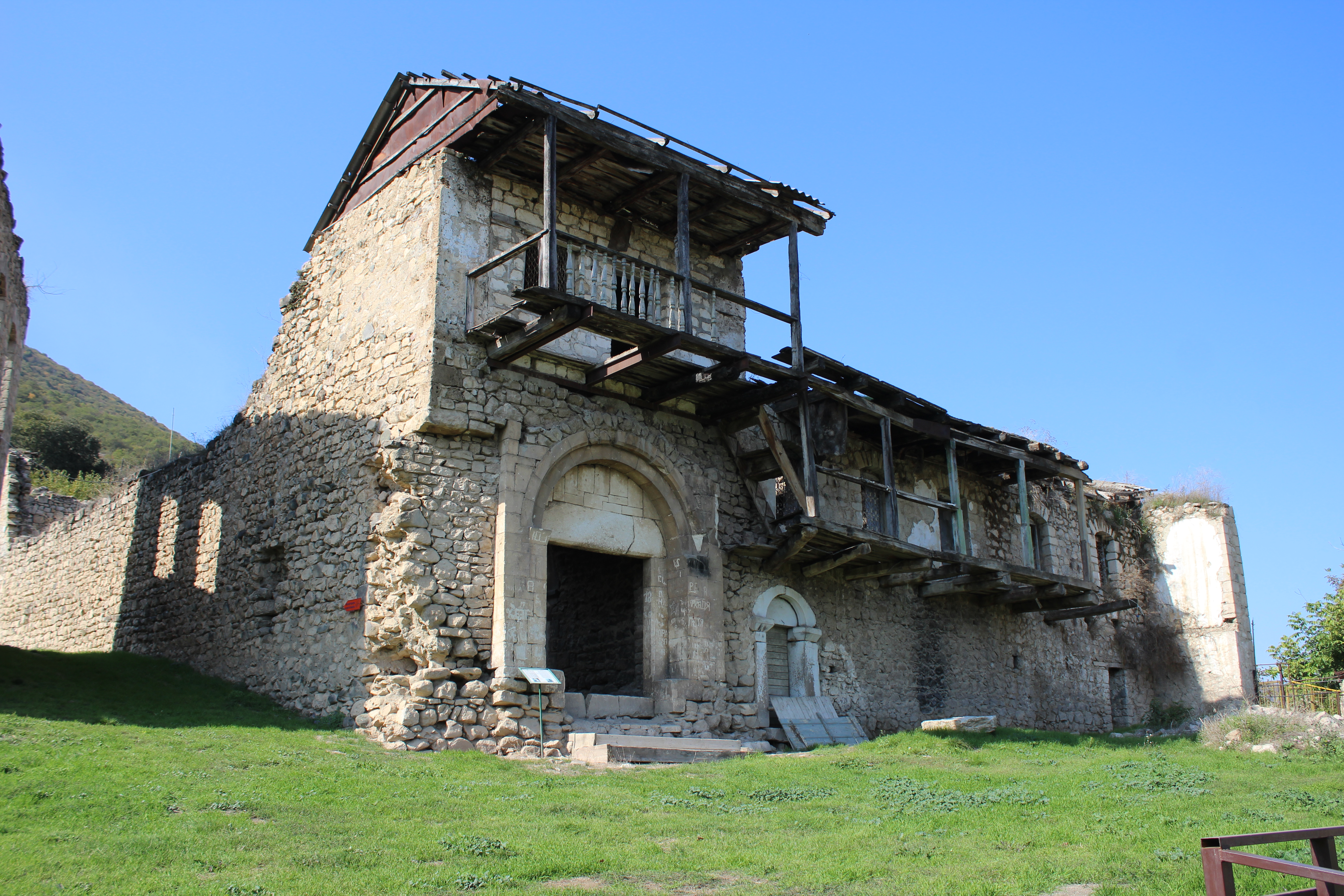
- One of the buildings of the palace
- Alternative names: Azerbaijani: Dizaq məliklərinin sarayı

General information
- Architectural style: Armenian
- Location: Togh (Tugh), Nagorno-Karabakh, Azerbaijan
- Coordinates: 39.588069°N 46.96465°E
- Construction started: 18th century

Togh's Melikian Palace (Armenian: Տողի մելիքական ապարանք, romanized: Toghi Melikakan Aparank), also known as the Palace of Melik Yegan or the Palace of Dizak Meliks (Azerbaijani: Dizaq məliklərinin sarayı) is an 18th-century palace, located in the central part of the village of Togh (Tugh), in the formerly disputed region of Nagorno-Karabakh. According to an inscription in the palace buildings, the structure was built in the early 1700s by Melik Yegan, an Armenian melik of Dizak. Prior to the 2020 Nagorno-Karabakh war, the property was maintained by a descendant of Melik Yegan, Alexander Yeganyan.

== History ==
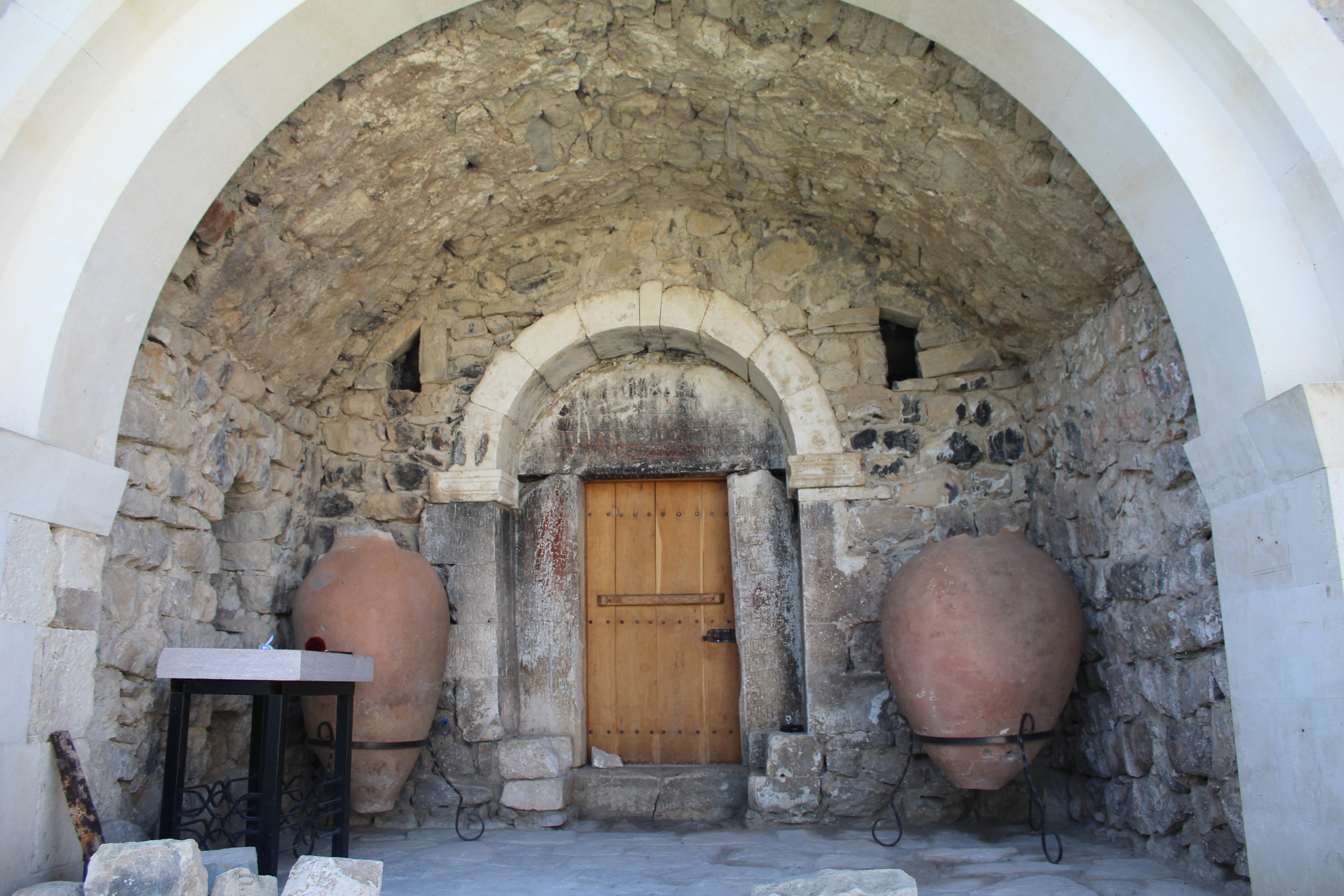
Portal to reception room

The artistic and architectural features of the buildings included in the complex, as well as epigraphic samples show that different parts of it were built at different times. According to Mkrtchyan, who studied the monument, the first floor of the main palace building was built in the 20s and 30s of the 18th century, and the second floor in the early 19th century.

It is written in the book placed on the portal on the entrance door of the reception room:

Summer of 1737 . This reception room is a memory. That's what happened. I, the son of King Yegan of Vardapet Gukas, was elected leader by the people. During the turmoil in the country, I served Shah Sultan Hussein and Tsar Tahmasib, and he confirmed me as king . Then the Ottomans came and took the throne from him. I also served him, and when it came to Dizaka, I did not allow him to be taken prisoner in Armenia. The mighty Tsar Nadir Shah, who came to Artsaka, came with his army and took the country from the Ottomans. I served him, and he made me a Christian province of 6 - Talysh, Chilaburt, Cross, Varanda, Kocis, Dizag- He honored him by declaring him khan and prince. Whoever reads what is written later and knows what our deeds are, let him say at least once: have mercy, father. The end. Amen.

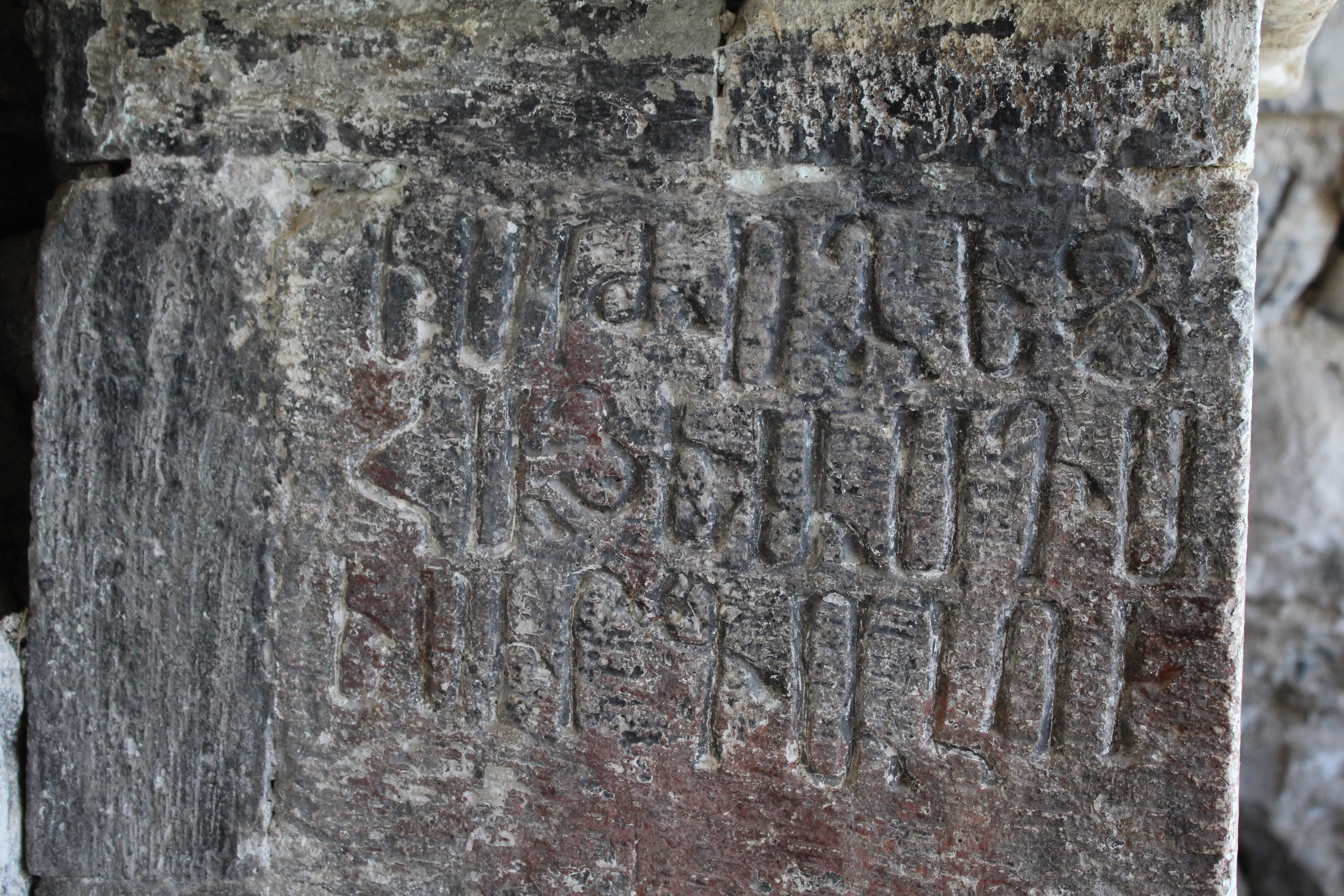
Armenian inscription on the palace

What is mentioned in the book is also confirmed in the Persian, Turkish and Armenian language sources of that time. The inscription on the tombstone of Malik Yegan reads :

This is the tomb of a brave prince named Yegan, the son of Momin Vardapet. He was loved by everyone, including Nadir Shah . He ruled in the Artsak region of Aluank. Summer of 1744.

== Architecture ==
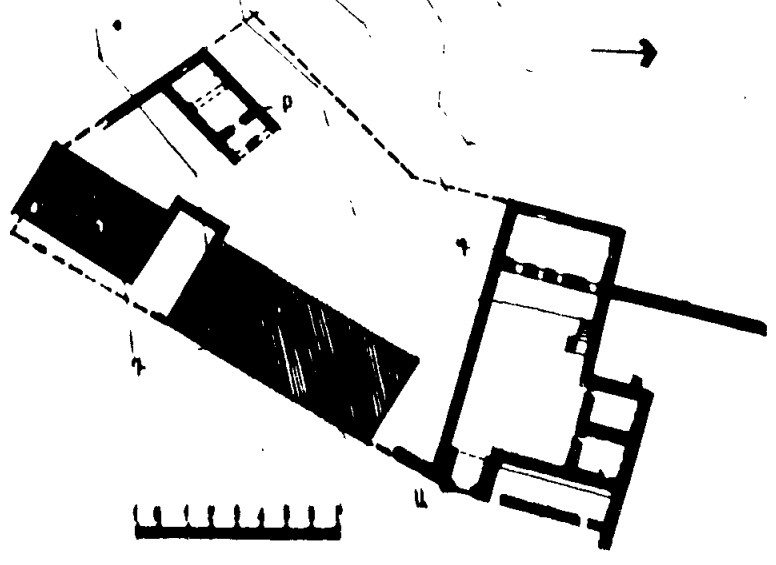
General plan of the palace

Located in the center of Togh, the complex measures 38 x 13.24 meters and has a rectangular shape. On the north and south-east sides of the palace, the remains of thick walls protruding from the perimeter of the castle walls remain.

Despite some minor changes, the royal palace's original appearance has largely been preserved. The guest and living rooms of the palace are grouped in three directions. Some of the rooms open directly into the courtyard of the palace. On the first floor of the north-eastern part of the palace there are two rooms. Above them, on the second floor, there is a large hall with a balcony. The rooms on the first floor are the oldest parts of the palace, and are reminiscent of arched houses. Each of the rooms on the first floor has a window, and window and door spaces are stone-framed. There are niches in the interiors of the rooms.

On the west side of the rectangular courtyard there is a building with a façade covered with well-hewn stones and a balcony with columns. With the exception of the east wall, the other three walls of this building are a continuation of the castle walls. The columnar balcony also had an additional functional feature; The balcony, which was higher than the courtyard and connected to the courtyard by a stone staircase, and became a stage during palace events. The fireplaces and deep niches in the rooms on the first floor indicate that the building was secular in nature. Although the main entrance is on the west side of the building, the stone stairs descending from the balcony on the second floor connect it with the palace courtyard.

The largest hall of the palace building is located to the right of the parade stairs, on the south–north axis. The hall has three doors. The main door is on the west wall and the other two doors are on the east. The palace's living room is located above the parade stairs and is the tallest of all the buildings. From the balcony of the room there is a scenic view of all the surrounding areas. The palace, located in the center of Togh, has been described to occupy a connection between the secular and religious buildings of the village.

The rooms on the second floor were built later and are reminiscent of Togh's traditional houses in terms of layout. Similar features of the second floor with the older part of the palace are wide window frames, wide and multi-column balconies. During the construction of the palace complex, white and yellowish limestone from the stone quarry in the Fuzuli region, as well as well-cut gray basalt stones were used.

Malik Yegan's two-storey reception room is located in the southern part of the palace, 25 meters from the castle walls. The room's original appearance has been preserved. The reception room is small, has a balcony and a double front. The entrance tympanum is built of well-hewn stones and has an inscription.

The first floor of the reception room is completely underground and connects the palace with the garrison via an underground passage. The second floor of the reception room is located at ground level. In the 19th century, city-type living rooms with balconies on three sides were built above the reception room.

== Gallery ==
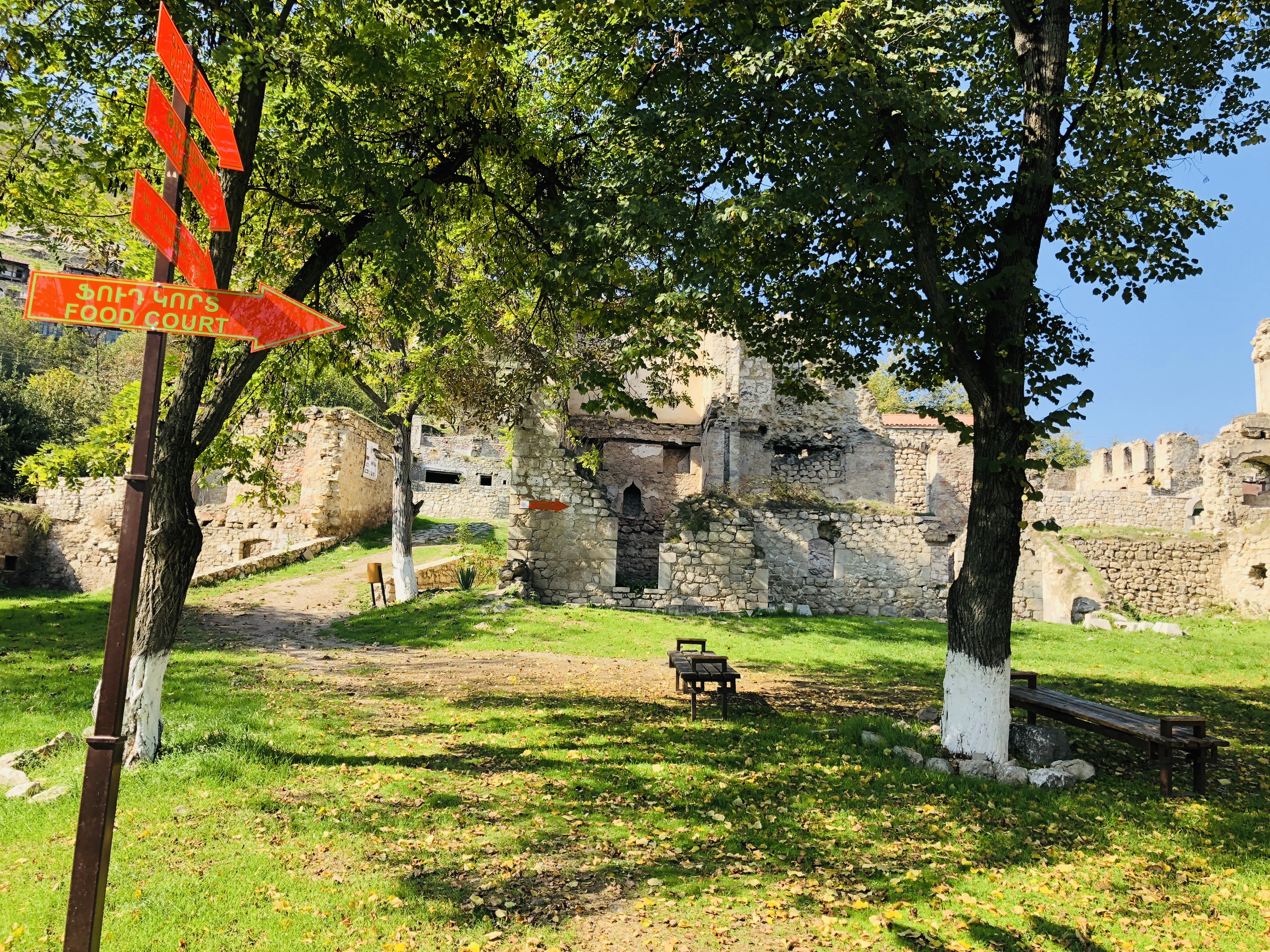

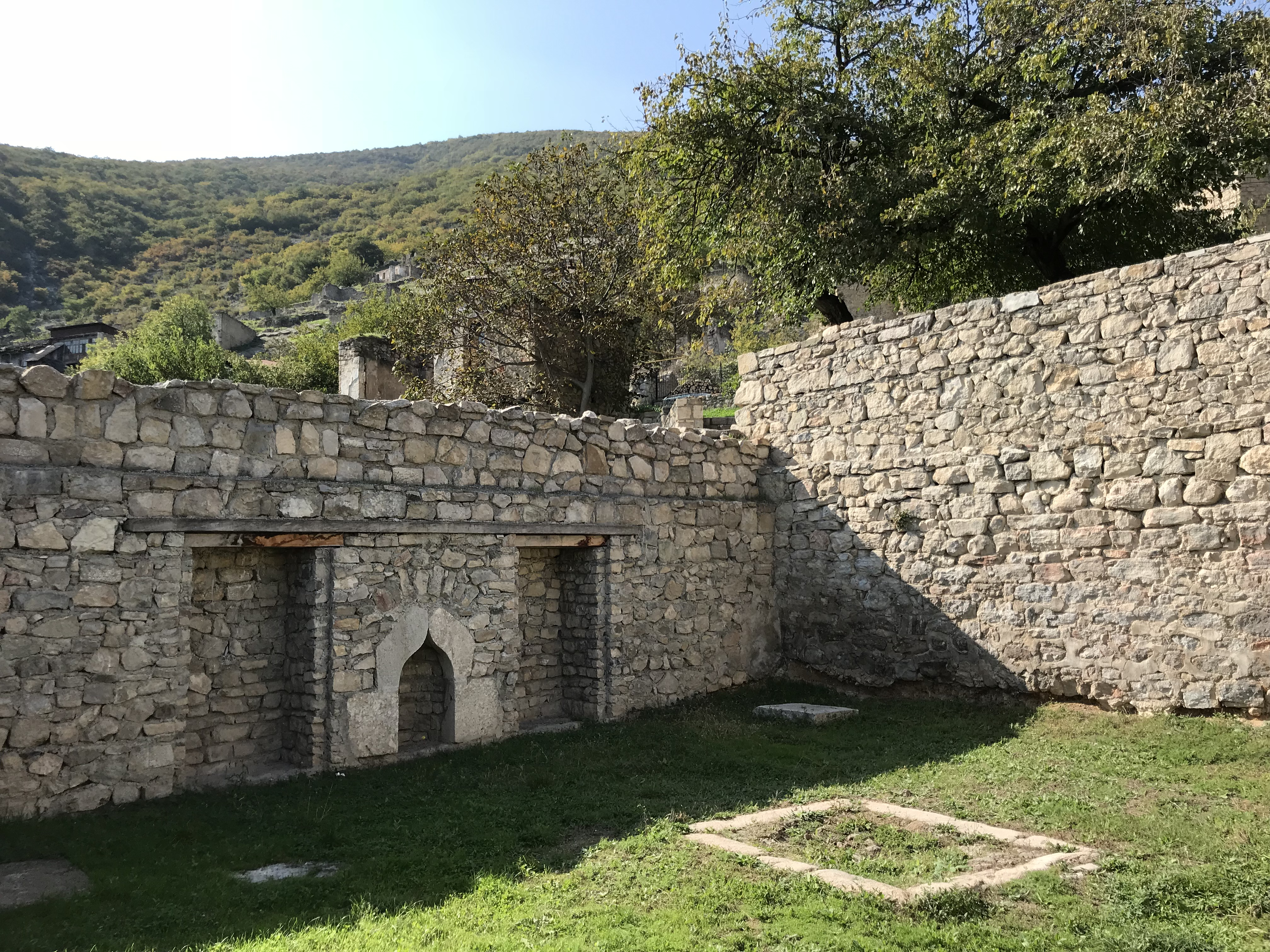

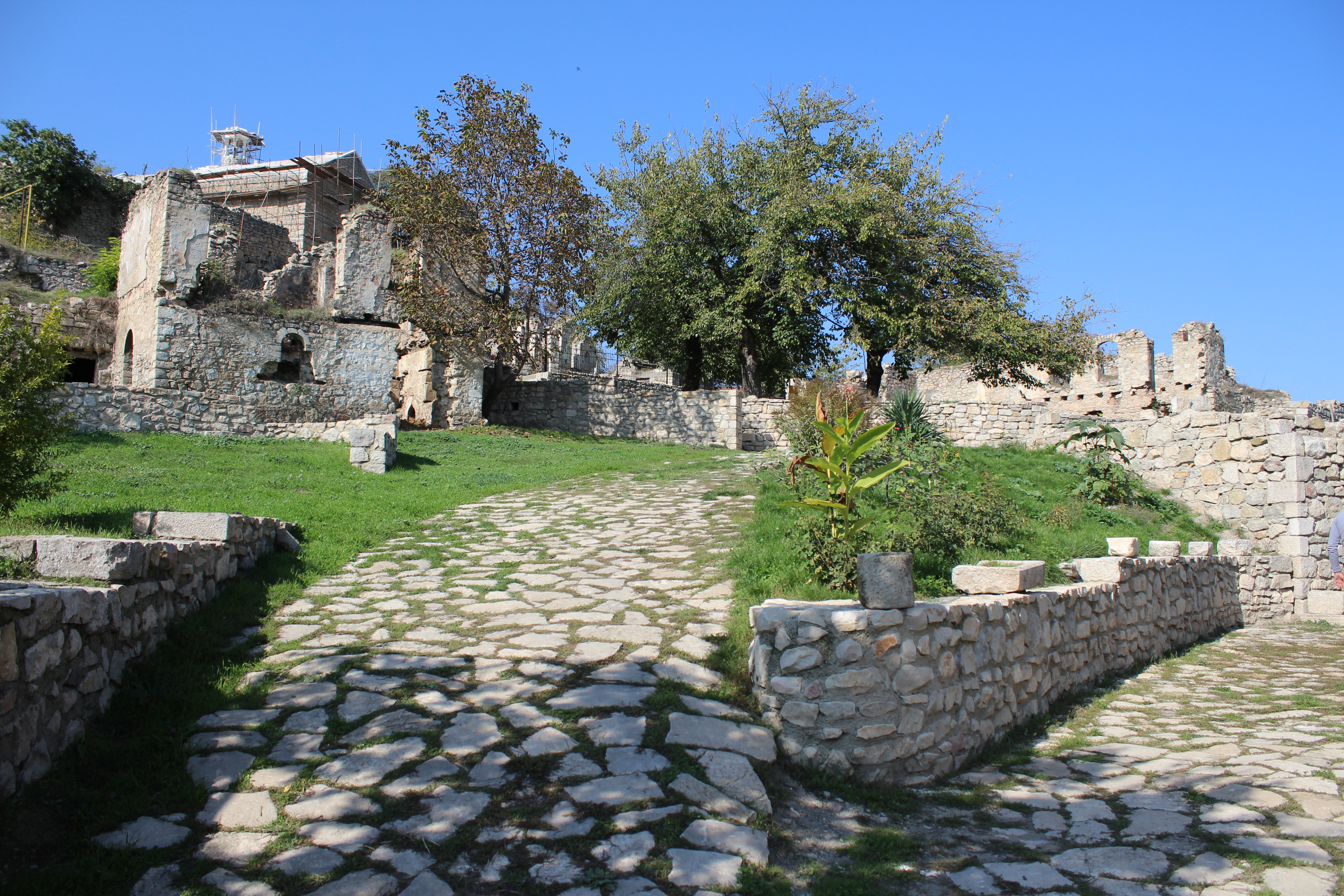

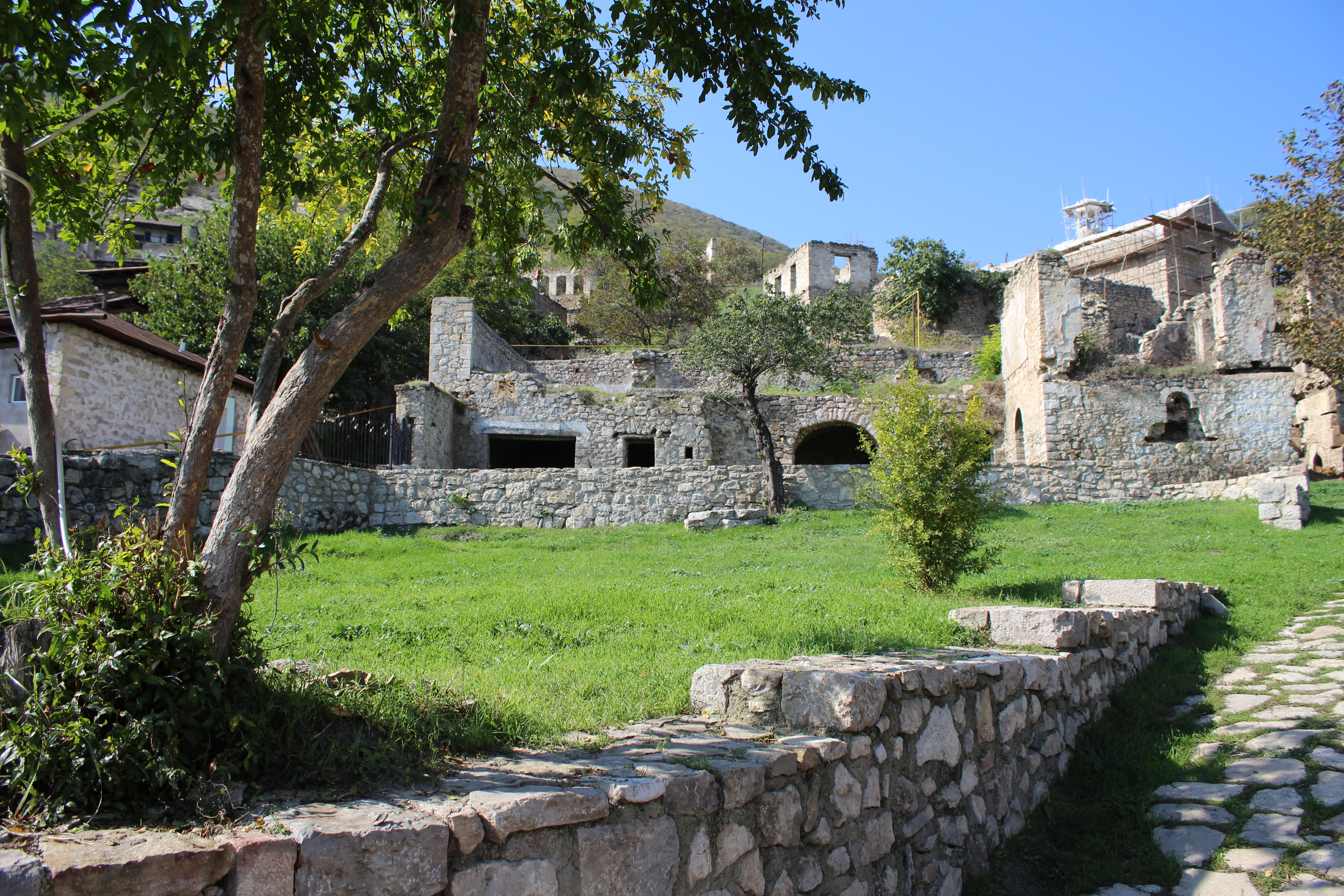

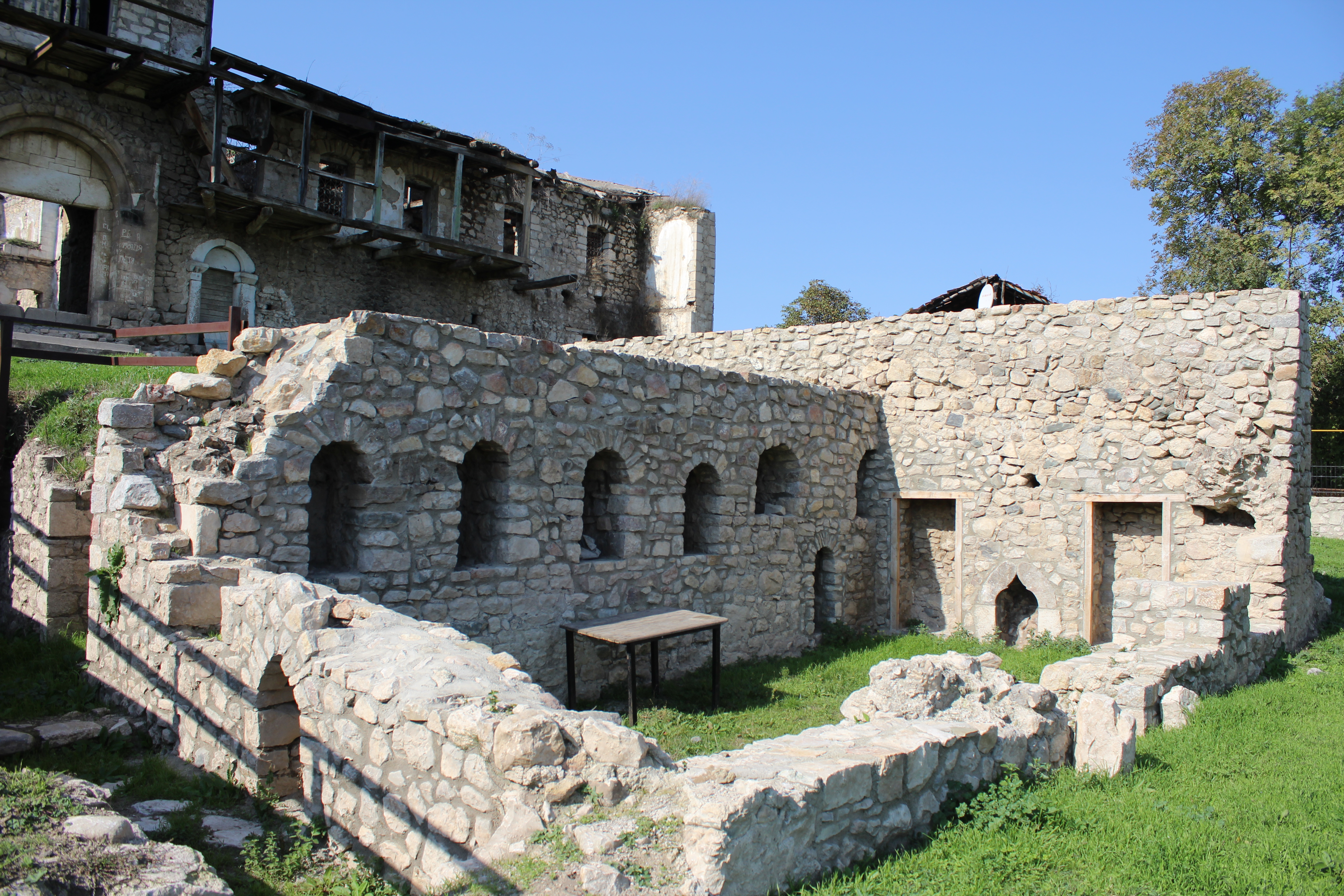

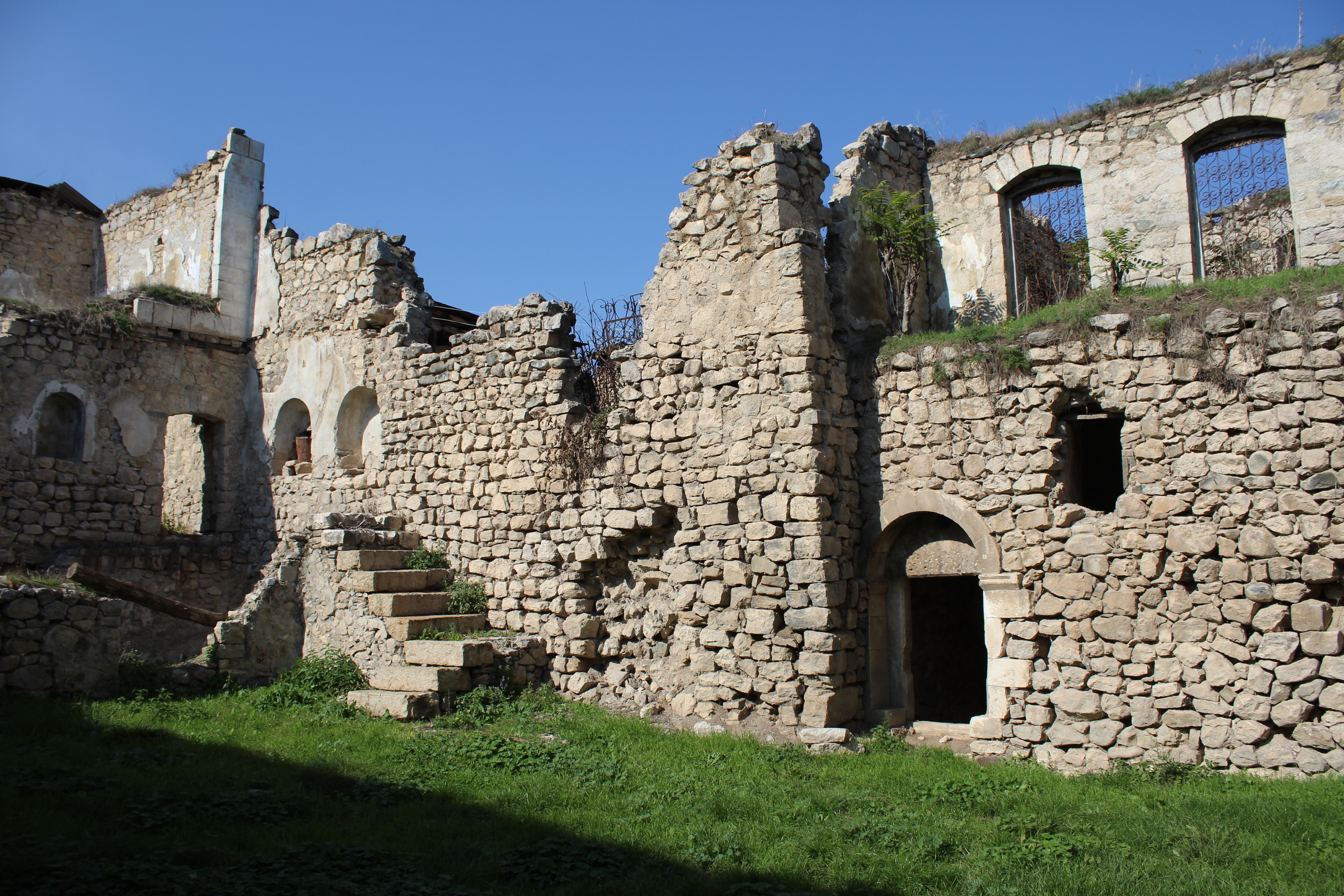

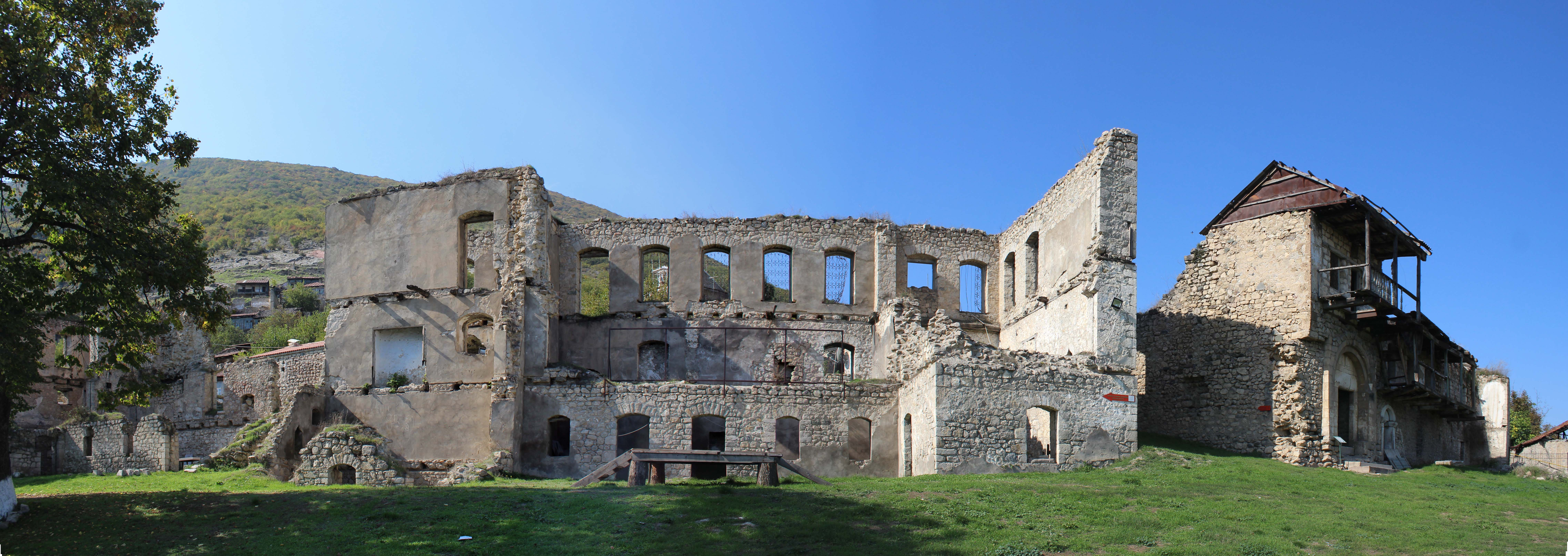
