= Mamar Mosque =

Former mosque in Qubadli, Azerbaijan

- Azerbaijani: Məmər Məscidi
- Location of the former mosque in Azerbaijan

Religion
- Affiliation: Islam (former)
- Ecclesiastical or organisational status: Mosque (18th century–1928); Profane use (1928–1991); Mosque (1991–1993); Profane use (1992–2020)
- Status: Abandoned (ruinous state)

Location
- Location: Məmər, Qubadli District
- Country: Azerbaijan
- Coordinates: 39°15′08″N 46°41′44″E

Architecture
- Type: Mosque architecture
- Completed: 18th century

The Mamar Mosque (Azerbaijani: Məmər Məscidi) is a former mosque and historical architectural monument located in the village of Məmər (Mamar) in the Qubadli District of Azerbaijan.

Built in the 18th century, the former mosque was included in the list of immovable historical and cultural monuments of local importance by the decision No. 132 of the Cabinet of Ministers of the Republic of Azerbaijan, dated August 2, 2001.

== About ==
The Mamar Mosque was built in the 18th century in the village of Məmər in the Qubadli District of Azerbaijan.

After the Soviet occupation in Azerbaijan, an official campaign against religion began in 1928. In December of that year, the Central Committee of the Communist Party of Azerbaijan transferred many mosques, churches, and synagogues to clubs for educational purposes. While there were 3,000 mosques in Azerbaijan in 1917, this number decreased to 1,700 by 1927, 1,369 by 1928, and just 17 by 1933. The Mamar Mosque was also closed for worship during this period, and the building was used as a storage facility.

Mosque sustained major damage after occupation of Gubadly district by Armenain forces when its roofing was torn down. From October 2009 until the 2020 Nagorno-Karabakh War, the mosque building remained in this damaged condition. Videos post-dating the war show that while the area was under Armenian administration, the remaining structure was used for keeping animals.

== See also ==
- Islam in Azerbaijan
- List of mosques in Azerbaijan
