= Şıxımlı, Kurdamir =

Şıxımlı
- Municipality
- Location within Azerbaijan
- Coordinates: 40°22′54″N 48°11′41″E
- Country: Azerbaijan
- Rayon: Kurdamir
- Time zone: UTC+4 (AZT)
  - Summer (DST): UTC+5 (AZT)

Şıxımlı (also, Shikhimly and Shykhymly) is a village and municipality in the Kurdamir Rayon of Azerbaijan.
