= Şıxımlı, Fuzuli =

Şıxımlı
- Location within Azerbaijan Location within Karabakh Economic Region
- Coordinates: 39°36′08.6″N 47°03′43.8″E
- Country: Azerbaijan
- District: Fuzuli
- Time zone: UTC+4 (AZT)
  - Summer (DST): UTC+5 (AZT)

Şıxımlı (Shykhymly) is a village in the Fuzuli District of Azerbaijan.
