= Esayi Abu-Muse =

Esayi Abu-Musa (Armenian: Եսայի Աբու-Մուսե or Ապումուսէ; in Arabic sources: Isa ibn-Istifanus) was an Armenian prince of southern Artsakh who ruled over a significant part of Arran (called Ałuankʻ in Armenian sources) in the mid-9th century and is considered the founder of the Principality of Dizak.

== Name and origins ==
Abu-Musa means "father of Musa" (Moses) in Arabic, in Armenian sources he is surnamed "the Priest's son". Arabic sources also call him Isa ibn-Yusuf (son of Hovsep) or Isa ibn-ukht-Istifanus (nephew of Stepanos), the latter being a reference to his maternal uncle Stepanos-Ablasad, who according to the historian Leo was a Mihranid whose fiefs succeeded to Esayi Abu-Muse after his murder in 831. Leo identifies Esayi Abu-Muse as a member of the local Arran dynasty of Aranshahik.

== Reign ==
Esayi's succession took place in ca. 841 and he remained in power for 13 years. Most of his domains included the cantons of Artsakh, which previously had offered a strong resistance against Babak Khorramdin. Esayi's seat was Ktish (Dogh), another important stronghold was Goroz. The ruins of this castles today lie near the villages Toumi and Togh in the disputed region of Nagorno-Karabakh.

The Armenian historian Movses Kaghankatvatsi, who described Esayi Abu-Isa as a "man of peace", wrote that he ruled the following cantons:

- Verin-Vaykunik, Berdzor, Sisakan — western cantons of Artsakh bordering Syunik to the west.
- Haband, Amaras, Pazkank, Mkhank — southern cantons of Artsakh bordering the river Araxes to the south.
- Tri-Gavar — a south-eastern canton of Utik bordering the river Kur to the north-east.

== Resistance at Ktish ==
In 854, Dizak was invaded by an Abbasid army, commanded by Bugha al-Kabir al-Sharabi, who previously had captured princes Atrnerseh of Khachen, Ktrij of Gardman and Kon-Stepanos Sevordiats of Utik. Esayi was besieged in his castle of Ktish, but remained victorious in 28 battles. According to the historian Tovma Artsruni, the Abbasid army had a strength of 200,000 men. He described Esayi's heroic resistance against Bugha al-Kabir's storming of Ktish. Mushegh Bagratuni (the son of Smbat Sparapet, who was forced to join the Abbasid army) recited a poem to this battle, comparing it with the second coming of Christ.

The resistance of Ktish endured for more than a year. Esayi wrote to the caliph protesting against the attack and after receiving a guarantee of safe passage from him, he went to Bugha for peace talks. Bugha however treacherously captured him. In 855, Esayi Abu-Muse, along with him all the princes of Armenia who were captured by Bugha, were exiled to Samarra in Mesopotamia.

== Offspring ==
- 1. Esayi Abu-Muse
- 1.1 Movses-Muse
- 1.1.1 King Gagik of Dizak
- 1.1.2 Princess Sophy
- 1.1.3 Lord Vachagan of Goroz (Vashaqan ibn-Muse in Arab sources)

Princess Sophy left an Armenian inscription in the "Red Church" of Toumi, which dates back to 1000, presently preserved in the Artsakh State Museum.

== See also ==
- Sahl Smbatean
- Dizak
