= Tugh (village) =

Tugh / Togh Tuğ / Տող

- Location within Azerbaijan Location within Karabakh Economic Region
- Coordinates: 39°35′06″N 46°57′55″E
- Country: Azerbaijan
- District: Khojavend
- Elevation: 800 m (2,600 ft)

Population (2015)
  - Total: 756
- Time zone: UTC+4 (GMT)

Tugh (Azerbaijani: Tuğ) or Togh (Armenian: Տող) is a village in the Khojavend District of Azerbaijan, in the region of Nagorno-Karabakh. The village had a mixed Armenian-Azerbaijani population before the First Nagorno-Karabakh War, the Azerbaijani inhabitants fled the fighting in 1991, and the Armenian population fled the village during the 2020 Nagorno-Karabakh war.

== History ==
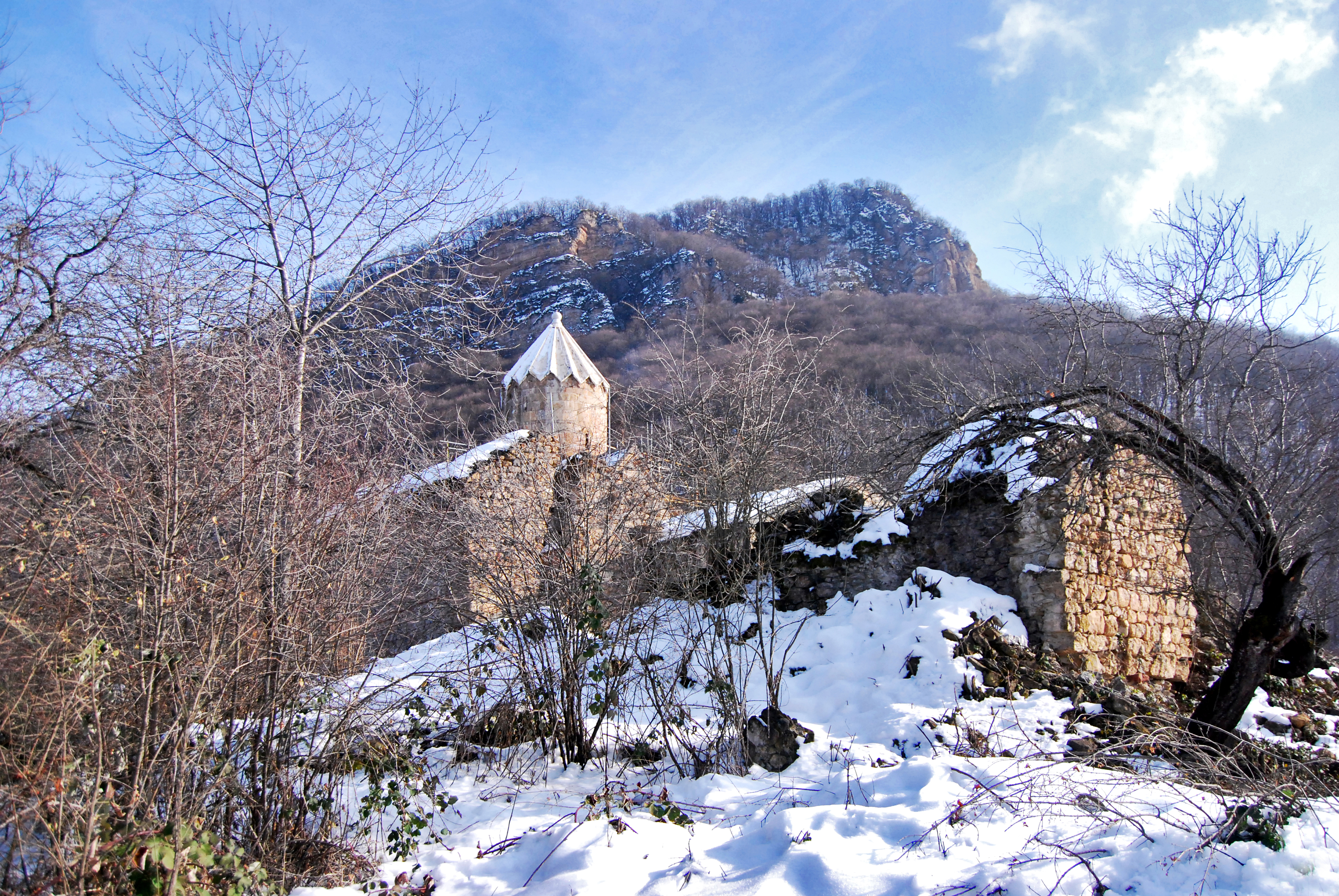
The 13th-century monastery of Gtichavank

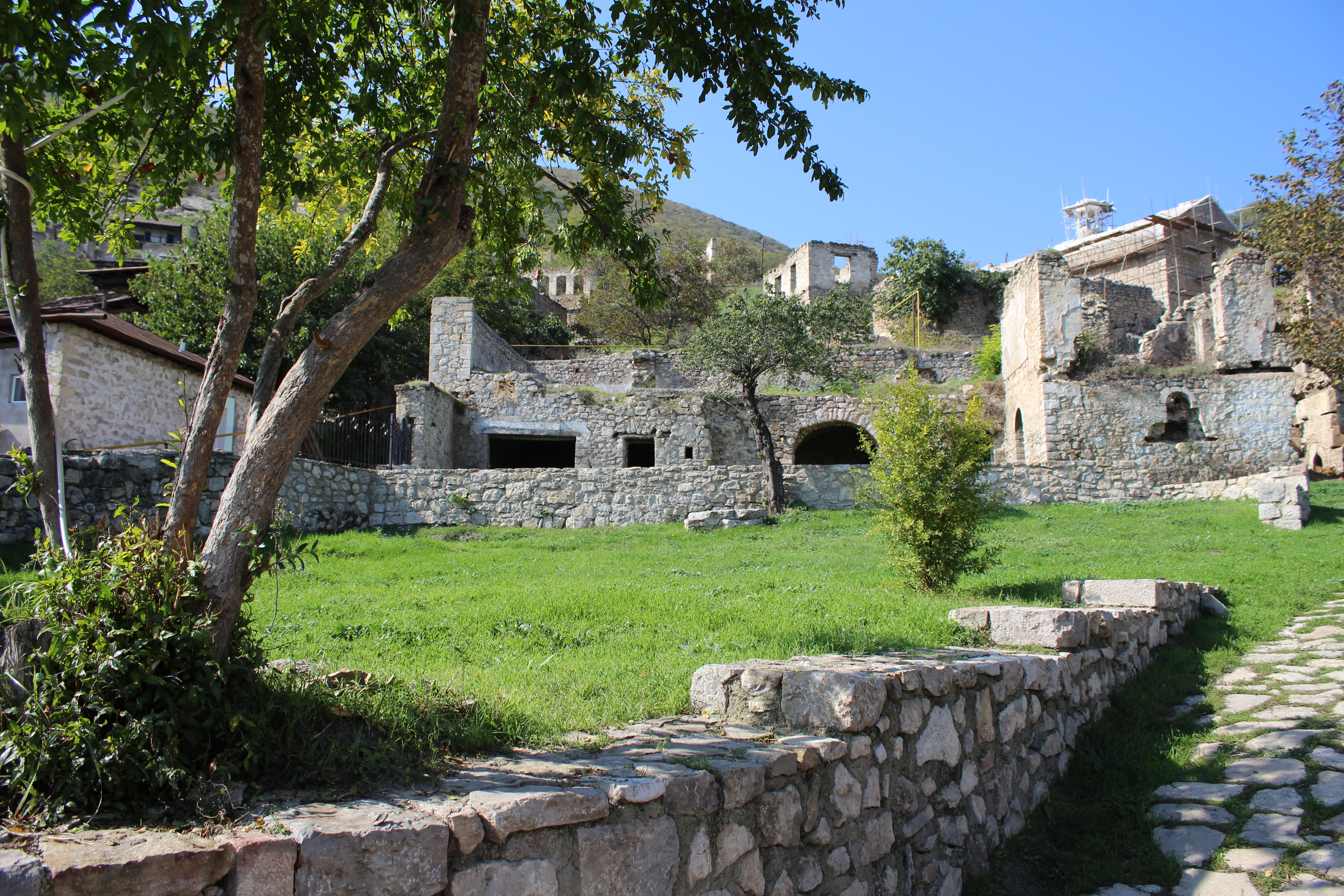
Preserved buildings of Togh's Melikian Palace, built in the early 1700s

The village and the neighboring fortress of Ktish (Armenian: Քթիշ) are first mentioned in the 9th century, as the capital of the Principality of Dizak. In 854, Esayi Abu-Muse, the Prince of Dizak, resisted an Abbasid army under the command of Bugha al-Kabir at Ktish for more than a year. Ktish began to be called Togh starting in the 15th century.

The 13th-century monastery of Gtichavank, and ruins of some churches including the 13th-century St. Stepan Church are located near the village. The village church is named St. Hovhannes (John's) and was built in 1736. A few of the Yeganyan meliks are buried in the yard of St. Hovhannes Church.

In 1737, Armenian prince (melik) Yegan built Togh's Melikian Palace here. The principality survived until the last prince, Yesayi Melik-Avanian, was killed by Ibrahim Khalil Khan in 1781, after a long-lasting resistance in the fortress of Ktish. The village was a part of the Karabakh Khanate until 1822, when it was annexed by Russia and became part of the Elisabethpol Governorate.

In 1903, a hospital was built and three years later a village school was opened which has functioned as a middle school in the present-day. A new school was built in 1978, which was renovated for the first time in 2008 by the Armenia Fund. The village also has a house of culture, a movie theater and a library.

During the Soviet period, the village was part of the Hadrut District of the Nagorno-Karabakh Autonomous Oblast.

During the First Nagorno-Karabakh War, in March 1988, Armenian armed militia detachments were formed to defend the village from Soviet and Azerbaijani attacks. The village came under Armenian control on 30 October 1991. As a result of the war, local Azerbaijani villagers were forced to flee and many settled in the Beylagan District of Azerbaijan. After the First Nagorno-Karabakh War, the village was administrated as part of the Hadrut Province of the breakaway Republic of Artsakh.

The village's Armenian population was displaced due to its capture by Azerbaijan on 9 October 2020, during the 2020 Nagorno-Karabakh war. The Artsakh Human Rights Ombudsman stated that there were reports of two civilians that had been killed, with one of them having been beheaded.

== Historical heritage sites ==
Historical heritage sites in and around the village include the fortress of Ktish (Armenian: Քթիշ, also Ktishberd, Քթիշբերդ) from between the 9th and 13th centuries, a 12th/13th-century khachkar, the monastery of Gtichavank (Armenian: Գտչավանք) built between 1241 and 1246, a cemetery from between the 17th and 19th centuries, St. John's Church (Armenian: Սուրբ Հովհաննես եկեղեցի, romanized: Surb Hovhannes Yekeghetsi) built in 1736, Togh's Melikian Palace (Armenian: Տողի մելիքական ապարանք, romanized: Toghi Melikakan Aparank) built in 1737, and St. Stephen's Church (Armenian: Սուրբ Ստեփանոս եկեղեցի, romanized: Surb Stepanos Yekeghetsi) built in 1747.

== Economy and culture ==
In 2015, the population was mainly engaged in agriculture and animal husbandry, and the village had a municipal building, a house of culture, a secondary school, a kindergarten, an art school, and a medical centre. The Kataro winery was opened by the Avetisyan family in 2010 in the village.

== Demographics ==
According to the Russian Empire census in 1897, where the village was mentioned as Tug (Russian: Тугъ), it had a population of 1,728 consisting of 1,482 Armenian Apostolics and 246 Muslims. The village had 857 men and 871 women.

In 1921, the village had 1,589 Armenian inhabitants. In 1974, there were 1,228 inhabitants, and in 1987 there were 1,421 inhabitants.

The Azerbaijani inhabitants of the village, as well as the inhabitants of the village of Salaketin in the Hadrut District, were forced to flee their homes as a result of Armenian armed formations' hostilities during the First Nagorno-Karabakh War.

In 2005, the village had an Armenian-majority population of 679 inhabitants, and in 2015 there were 756 inhabitants.

== Gallery ==
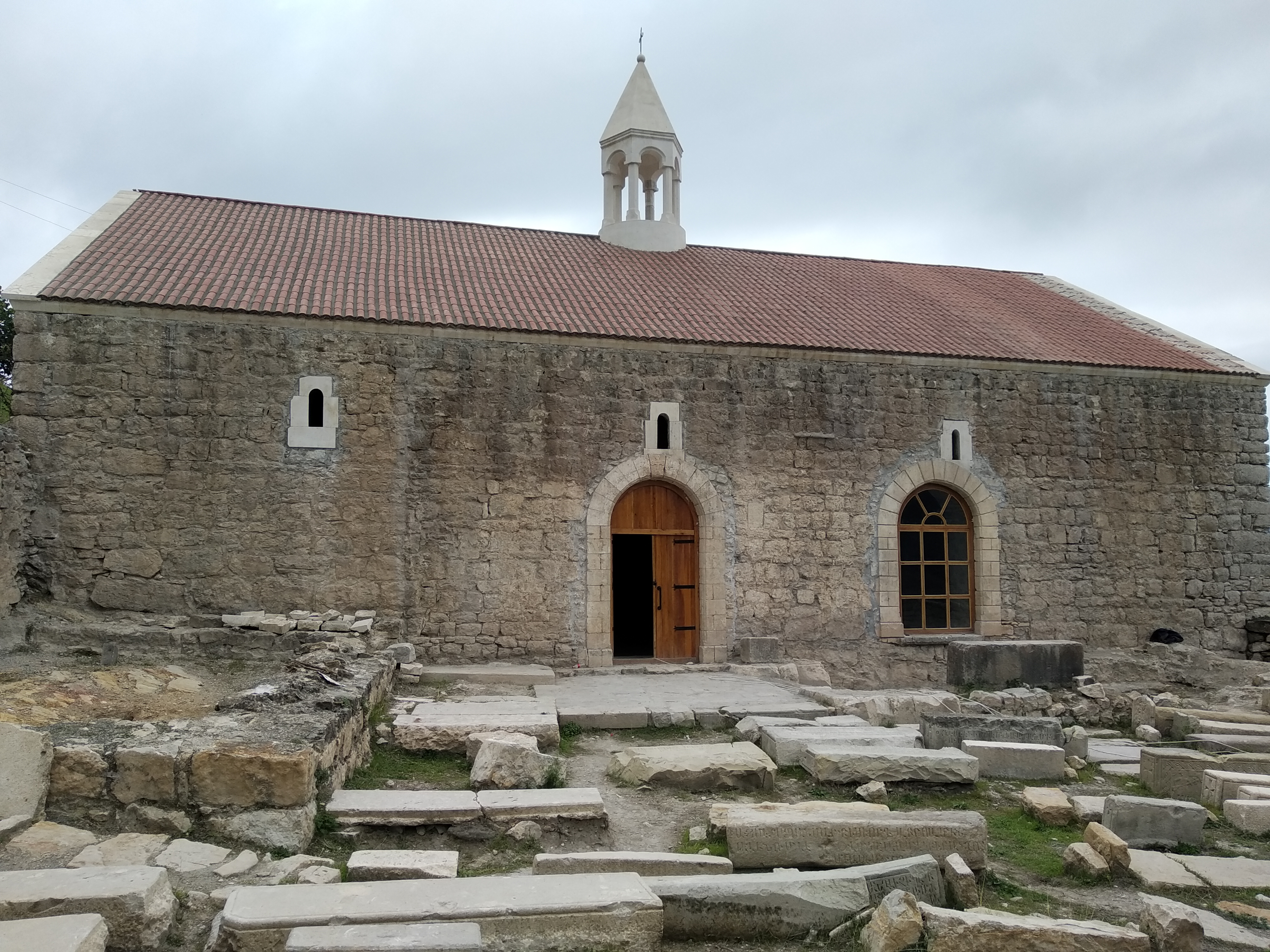
18th-century St. John's Church

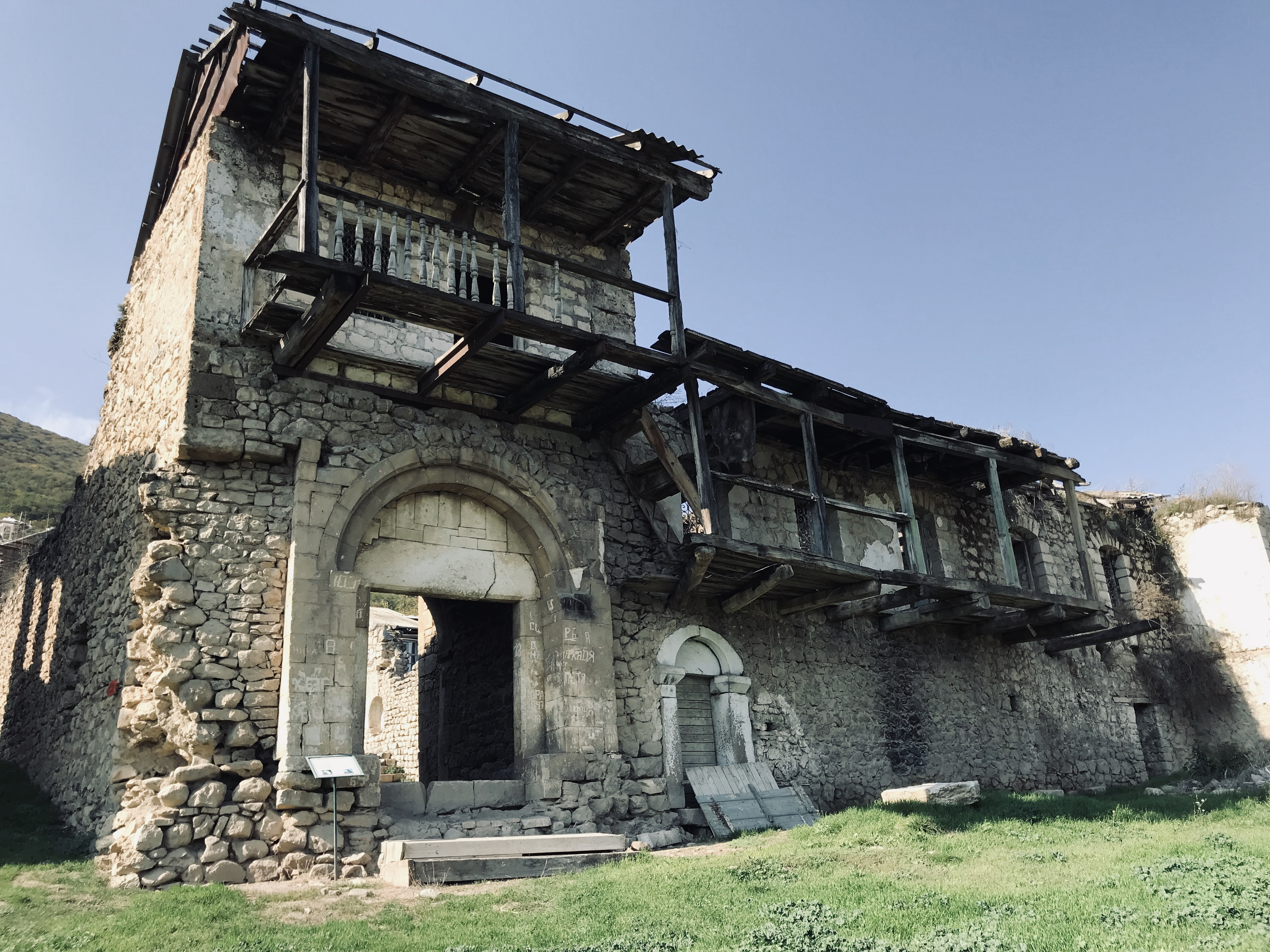
Buildings of Togh's Melikian Palace

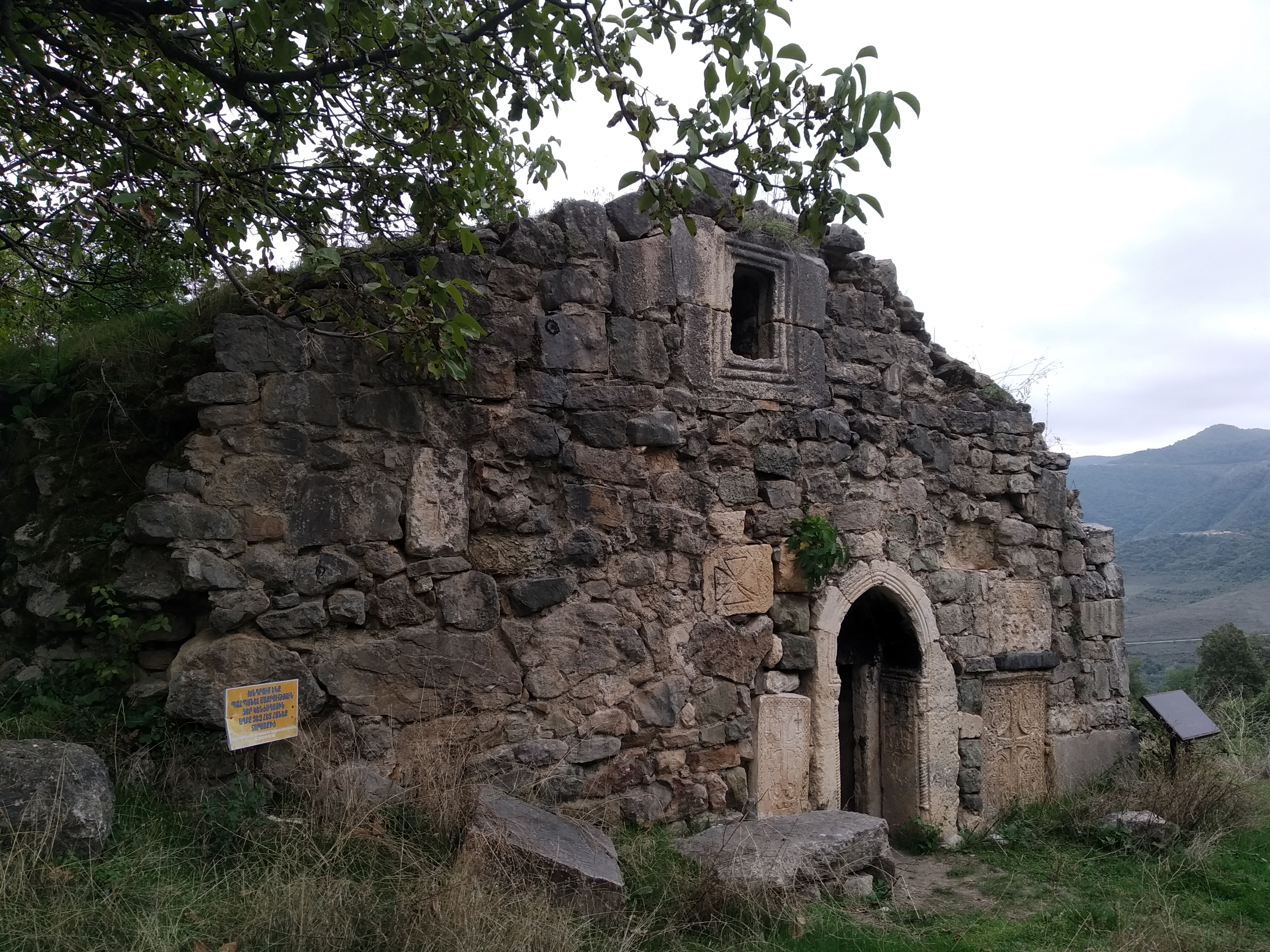
18th-century St. Stephen's Church

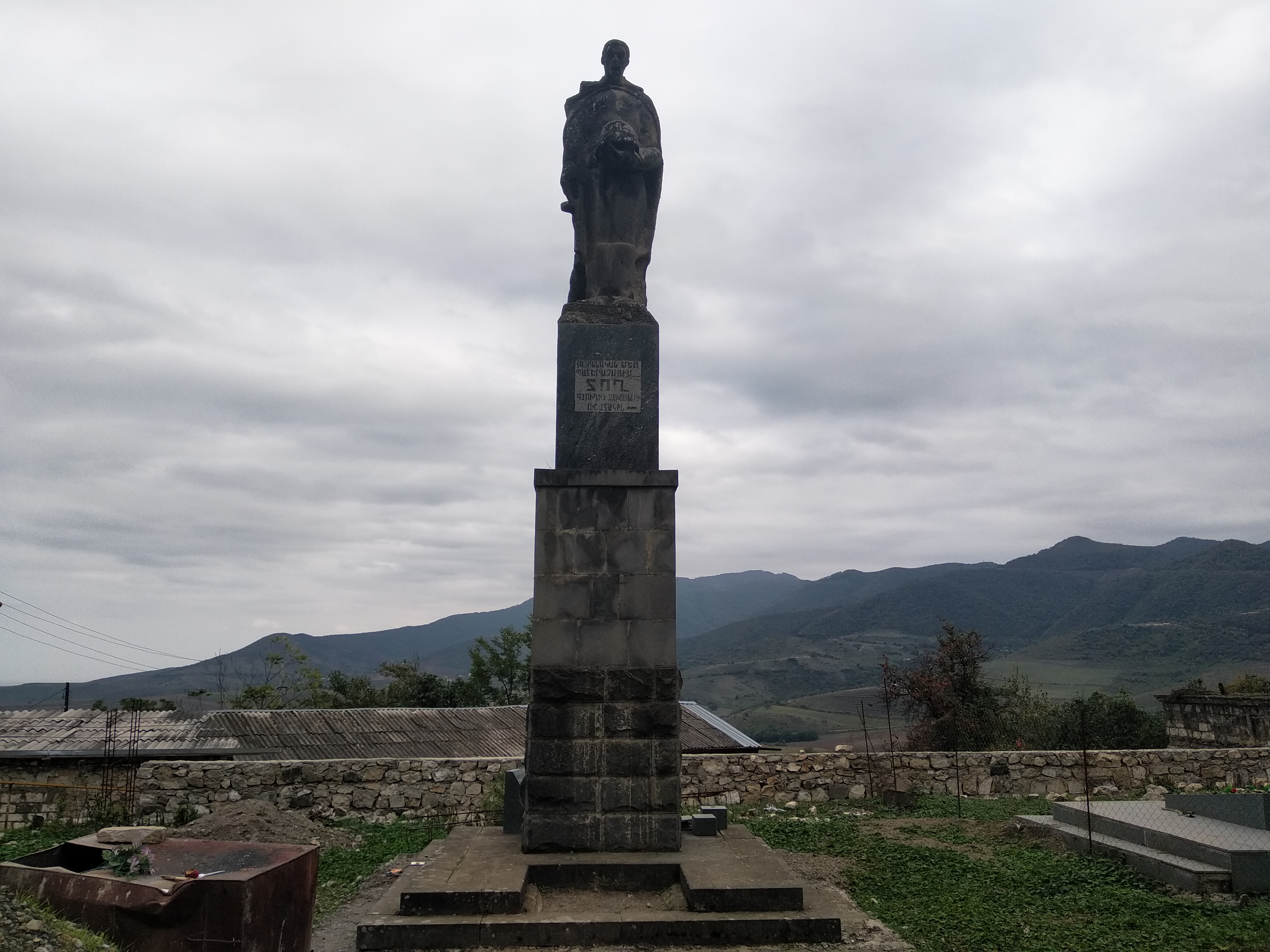
WWII monument

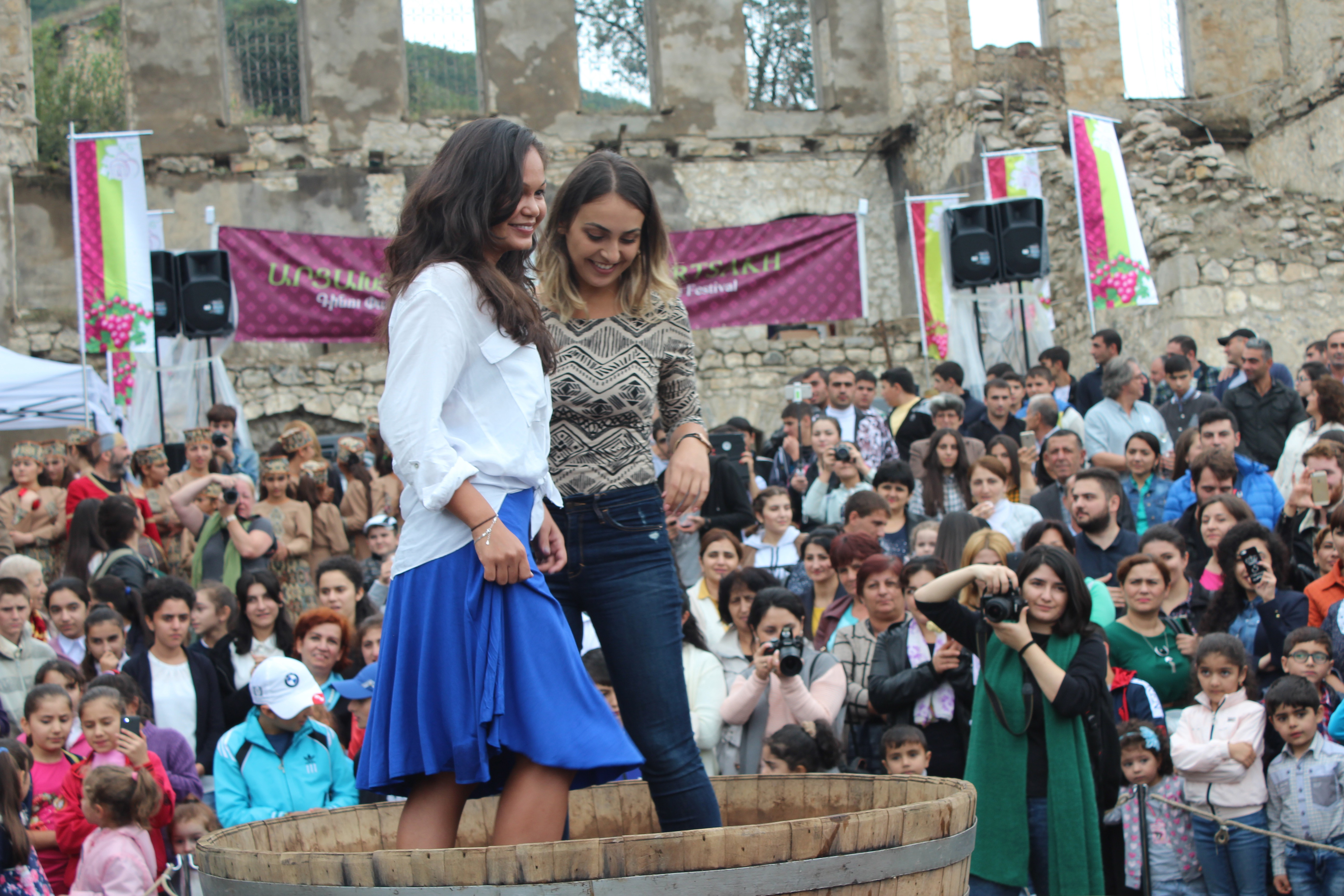
Third Annual Artsakh wine festival in the village

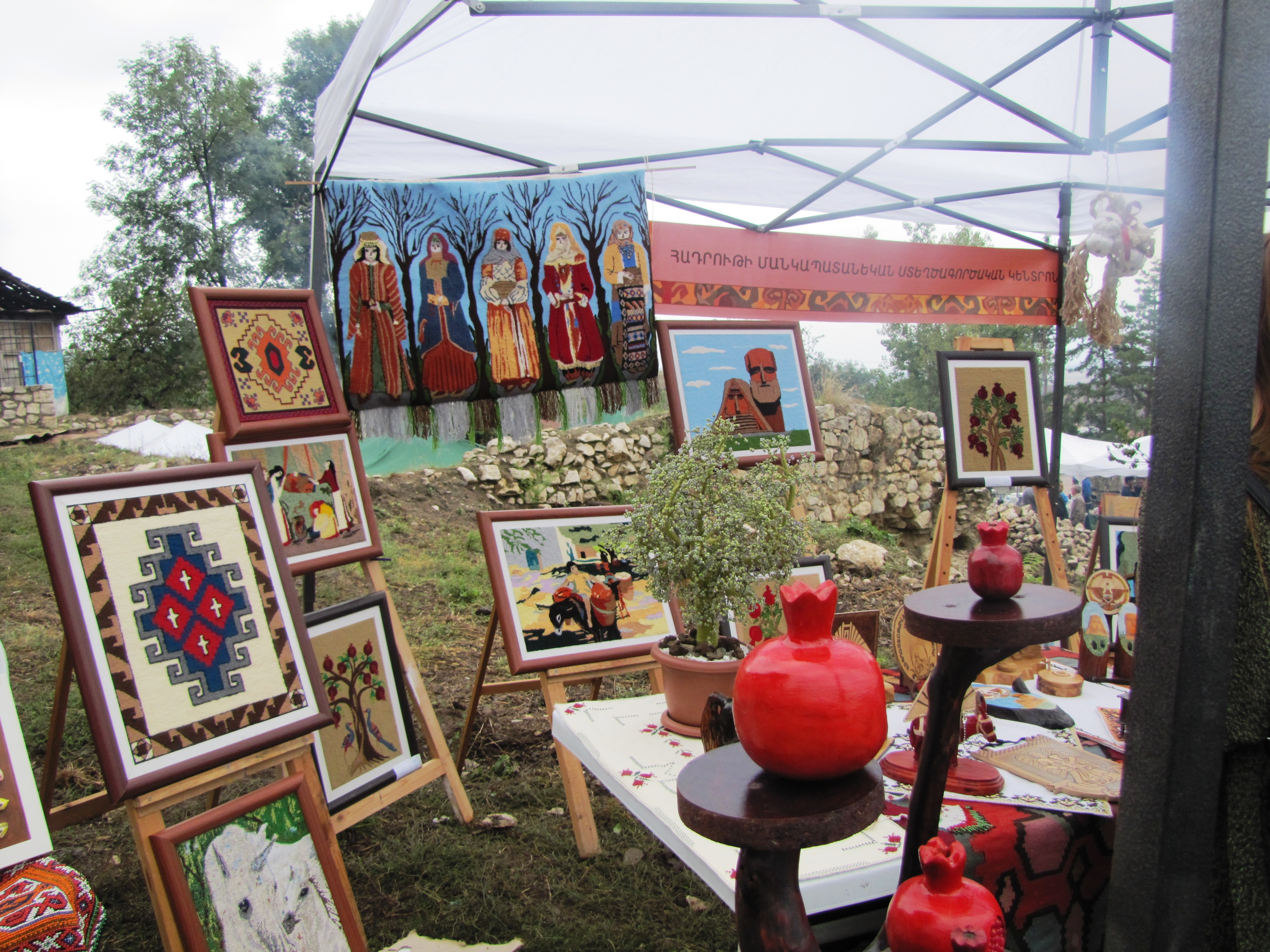
Exhibition of artworks at the Artsakh wine festival in the village

== Notable people ==
- Javad Malik-Yeganov - Azerbaijani Governor-General of Lankaran
- Aslan Mukhtarov - Azerbaijani scientist, recipient of the USSR State Prize.
- Ayriev Armen Tevanovich - Armenian Hero of the Soviet Union
- Vigen S. Grigoryan - Armenian battalion commander during the First Nagorno-Karabakh War
