= Aşağı Mollu =

- Location within Azerbaijan
- Coordinates: 39°18′11″N 46°41′54″E
- Country: Azerbaijan
- Rayon: Qubadli
- Time zone: UTC+4 (AZT)
  - Summer (DST): UTC+5 (AZT)

Aşağı Mollu (also, Ashagy-Mollu, Ashaga Molly, and Molly) is a village in the Qubadli Rayon of Azerbaijan.

Aşağı Mollu is the Azeri village in Qubadli.
