= Dizak =

Medieval Armenian principality

Coordinates: 32°36′46″N 62°31′25″E

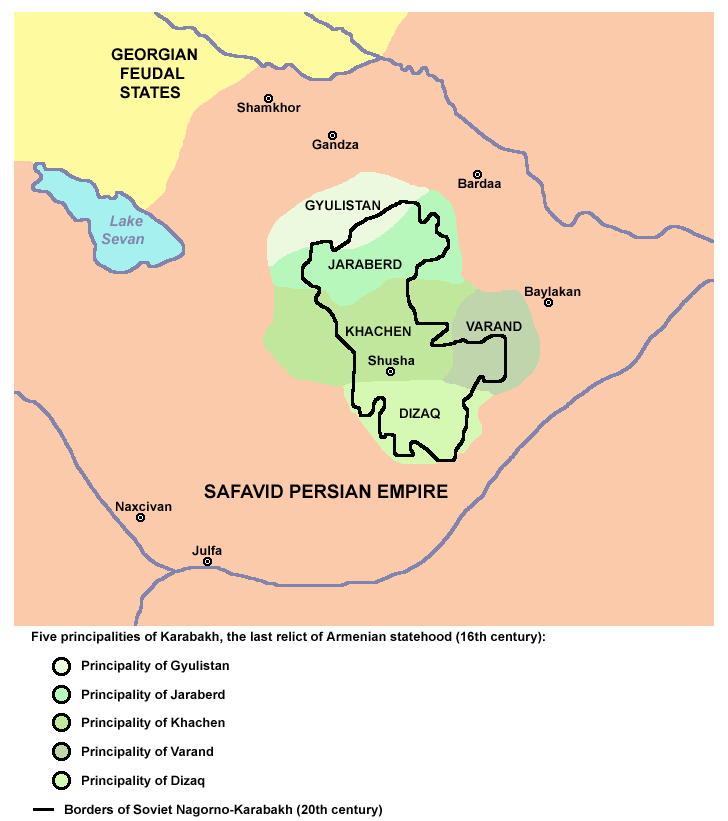
Principalities of Karabakh (16th century)

Dizak (Armenian: Դիզակ), also known as Ktish after its main stronghold, was a medieval Armenian principality in the historical province of Artsakh and later one of the five melikdoms of Karabakh, which included the southern third of Khachen (present-day Nagorno-Karabakh) and from the 13th century also the canton of Baghk of Syunik. The founder of this principality was Esayi Abu-Muse, in the 9th century. In the 16th-18th centuries, Dizak was ruled by the Armenian Melik-Avanian dynasty, a branch of the House of Syunik-Khachen. The seat of the princes of Dizak was the town of Togh (or Dogh) with the adjacent ancient fortress of Ktish. One of the last princes of Dizak, Esayi Melik-Avanian, was killed by Ibrahim Khalil Khan in 1781, after a long-lasting resistance in the fortress of Ktish.

Today the name "Dizak" is often used to refer to the Hadrut Province of the Republic of Artsakh.

== See also ==
- Esayi Abu-Muse
- Avan-khan
