= Armenian–Azerbaijani war (1918–1920) =

1918–20 conflict between Armenia and Azerbaijan

- Part of the Caucasus campaign of World War I, the Southern Front of the Russian Civil War, and spillover of the Eastern Front of the Turkish War of Independence
Date	30 March 1918 – 28 November 1920 (2 years, 7 months, 4 weeks and 1 day)
Location	South Caucasus
Result	Inconclusive
Territorial changes	Soviet invasion of Armenia and Azerbaijan; Disputes over Karabakh and Nakhchivan settled in favor of Soviet Azerbaijan; Most of Zangezur gained by Soviet Armenia

Belligerents
(First Republic of Armenia) Armenia; Special Striking Division	(Azerbaijan Democratic Republic) Azerbaijan; Ottoman Empire; Republic of Aras (1918–1919)	Russian SFSR; (Azerbaijan Soviet Socialist Republic) Azerbaijani communists; (Armenian Soviet Socialist Republic) Armenian communists; (Ottoman Empire) Turkish revolutionaries

Commanders and leaders
(First Republic of Armenia) Drastamat Kanayan; (First Republic of Armenia) Hamazasp Srvandztyan; Andranik Ozanian (Note: Andranik condemned and refused to fight for the First Republic of Armenia.)	(Azerbaijan Democratic Republic) Samedbey Mehmandarov; (Azerbaijan Democratic Republic) Khosrov bey Sultanov; (Ottoman Empire) Cevat Pasha; Jafargulu Khan Nakhchivanski	(Russian Soviet Federative Socialist Republic) Anatoliy Gekker; (Russian Soviet Federative Socialist Republic) Boris Kamkov; (Russian Soviet Federative Socialist Republic) Ivan Tyulenev; (Ottoman Empire) Muzaffer Kılıç

Strength
(First Republic of Armenia) 60,000 (6,000 mobilized guards); ~1,500	(Azerbaijan Democratic Republic) 50,000 (Ottoman Empire) 36,000; 10,000	(Russian Soviet Federative Socialist Republic) 70,000 (Ottoman Empire) 13,000

The Armenian-Azerbaijani war (Note: Azerbaijani: Azərbaycan-Ermənistan müharibəsi; Armenian: Հայ-ադրբեջանական պատերազմ, romanized: Hay-adrbeǰanakan paterazm; Russian: Армяно-азербайджанская война, romanized: Armi͡ano-azerbaĭdzhanskai͡a voĭna.) was a conflict that took place in the South Caucasus in regions with a mixed Armenian-Azerbaijani population, broadly encompassing what are now modern-day Azerbaijan and Armenia. It began during the final months of World War I and ended with the establishment of Soviet rule.

The conflict took place against the backdrop of the Russian Civil War and the partition of the Ottoman Empire. Mutual territorial claims, made by the newly formed Azerbaijan Democratic Republic and the Republic of Armenia, led to their respective support for Azerbaijani and Armenian militias in the disputed territories. Armenia fought against Azerbaijani militias in the Erivan Governorate of the former Russian Empire, while Azerbaijan fought Armenian claims to the Karabakh region. The war was characterized by outbreaks of massacres and ethnic cleansing (such as the March Days, the September Days, the Shusha massacre, and more broadly, the massacres of Azerbaijanis in Armenia), which changed the demographics of the region.

Hostilities broadly came to an end when the Soviet 11th Army invaded and occupied both Azerbaijan and Armenia.

== Background ==
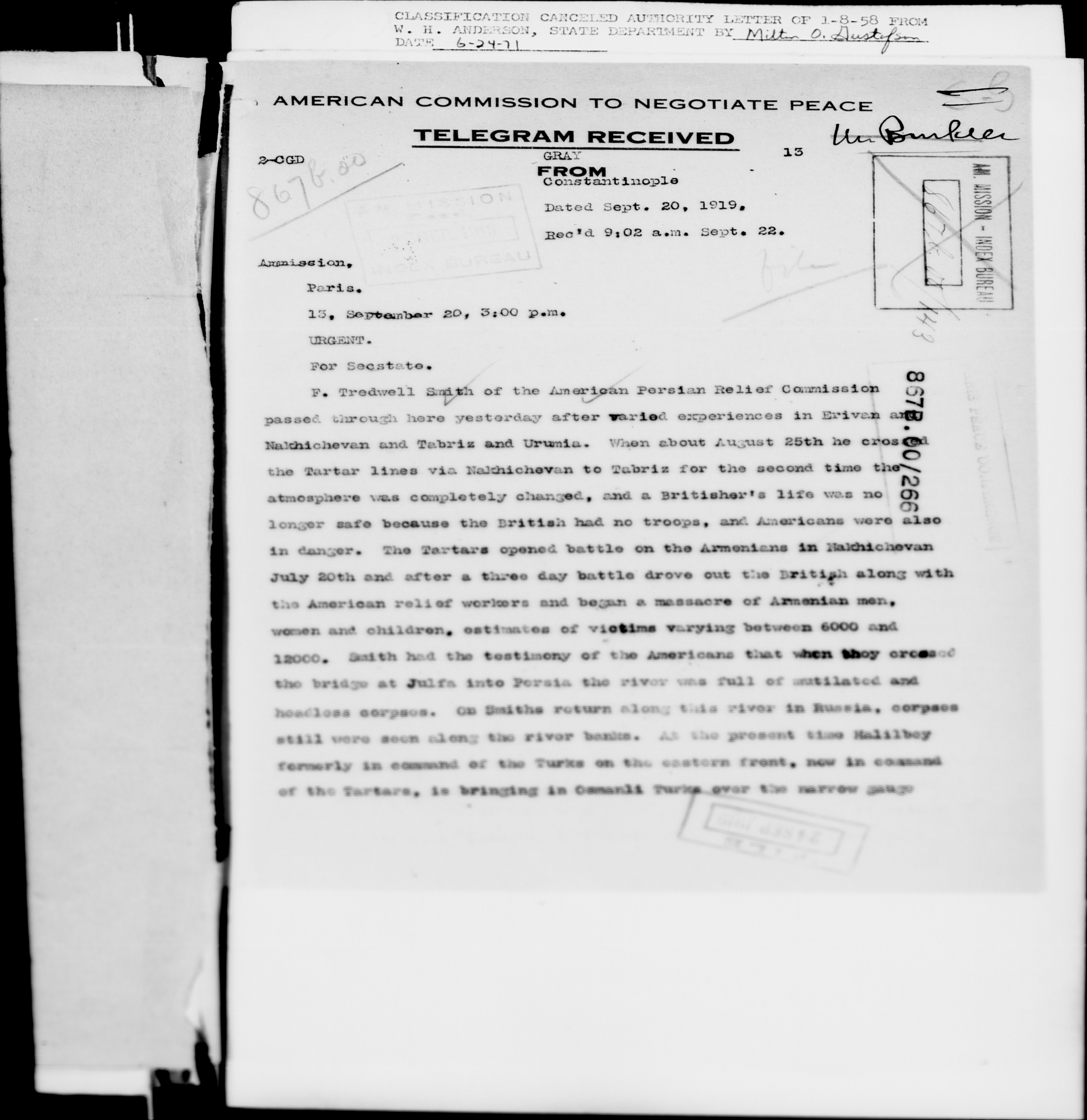
American Commission to Negotiate Peace telegram describing massacres around Nakhichevan

== War proper ==
On 30 March 1918, the Soviets, based on the unsubstantiated report that the Muslim crew of the ship Evelina was armed and ready to revolt against the Soviets, disarmed the crew, which tried to resist. This led to three days of fighting, resulting in the death of up to 12,000 Azerbaijanis.

=== Fight for Baku and Karabakh, 1918–1919 ===
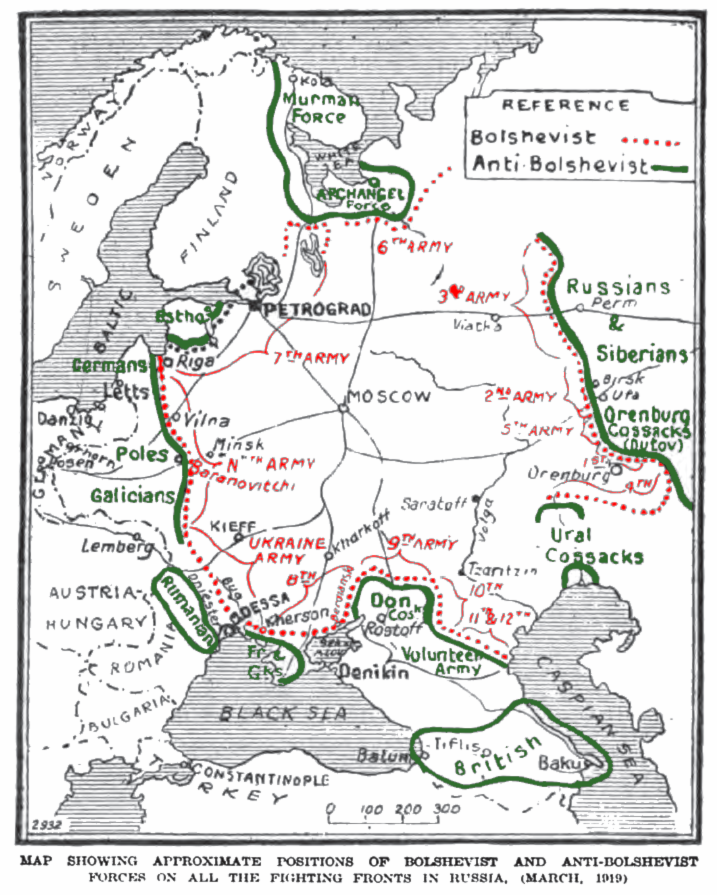
Place of British forces after Armistice

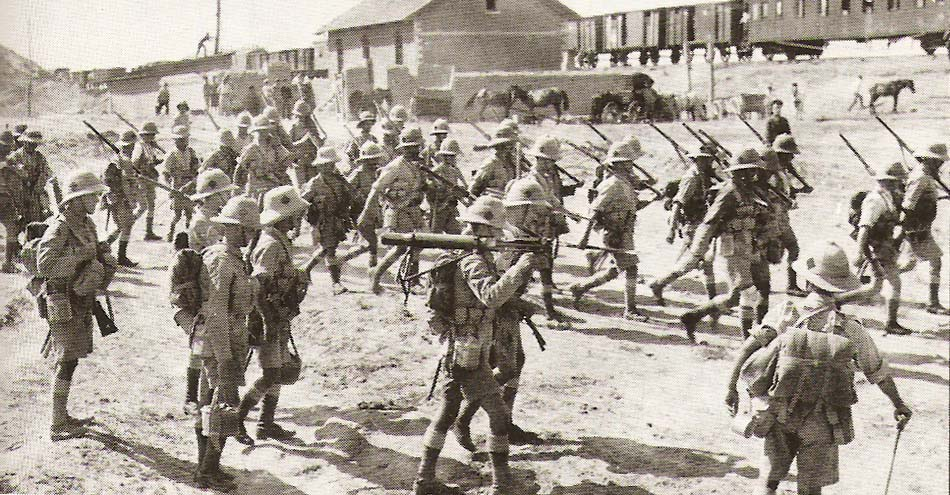
British forces in Baku

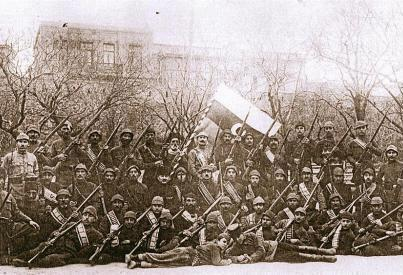
Soldiers and officers of the army of Azerbaijan Democratic Republic in 1918

At the same time the Baku Commune was involved in heavy fighting with the advancing Caucasian Ottoman Army in and around Ganja. The Ottoman Empire's Enver Pasha began to move forward with the newly established Army of Islam. Major battles occurred in Yevlakh and Agdash.

British General Lionel Dunsterville ordered the evacuation of the city on 14 September, after six weeks of occupation, and withdrew to Iran; most of the Armenian population escaped with the British forces. The Ottoman Army of Islam and its Azerbaijani allies, led by Nuri Pasha, entered Baku on 15 September and killed between 10,000 and 20,000 Armenians in retaliation for the March massacre of Muslims. The capital of Azerbaijan was finally moved from Ganja to Baku. However, after the Armistice of Mudros between the United Kingdom and the Ottoman Empire on 30 October, Turkish troops were replaced by the Triple Entente. Headed by British Gen. W. Thomson, who had declared himself the military governor of Baku, 1,000 Commonwealth soldiers arrived in Baku on 17 November 1918. By Gen. Thomson's order, martial law was implemented in Baku.

The Armenian government tried several times to seize Shusha militarily. In 1918, the Karabakh Council was declared in the region. However, throughout the summer of 1918 Armenians in the mountainous Karabag region, under the leadership of Andranik Ozanian, resisted the Ottoman 3rd Army. After the Armistice the Ottoman Empire began to withdraw its forces and Armenian forces under Andranik seized Nagorno-Karabakh. Armistice of Mudros brought Gen. Andranik the chance to create a base for further expansion eastward and form a strategic corridor extending into Nakhichevan.

In January 1919, Armenian troops advanced towards Shusha. They captured nine Azerbaijani villages on their way. Just before the Armistice of Mudros was signed, Andranik Ozanian was on his way from Zangezur to Shusha to take control of the main city of Karabakh. In January 1919, with Armenian troops advancing, the British military command asked Andranik to return to Zangezur with the assurances that this conflict could be solved at the Paris Peace Conference. Andranik pulled back his units, and the British command at Baku gave control to Khosrov bey Sultanov, a native of Karabakh and "ardent pan-Turkist", who was appointed the general-governor of Karabakh and ordered by the British to "squash any unrest in the region". Sultanov ordered attacks on Armenian villages the next day, increased the sizes of Azerbaijani garrisons in Shusha and Khankendi and drew up plans to destroy several Armenian villages to sever the link between Armenians in Karabakh and the region of Zangezur.

=== Fight for Nakhichevan, 1919–20 ===
In response to a British border proposal that would have assigned Nakhichevan to Armenia, Azerbaijanis of Nakhichevan revolted under the leadership of the local landowner Jafargulu Khan Nakhichevanski in December 1918 and declared the independent Republic of Aras, with its capital in Nakhichevan. The republic, which was essentially subordinate to Azerbaijan, continued to exist until mid-June 1919, when Armenian troops led by Drastamat Kanayan advanced into it to gain control over the region. They managed to capture the city of Nakhichevan in June 1919 and destroy the Republic of Aras, but afterwards fought combined regular Azerbaijani and Ottoman troops, who reinstated Azerbaijani control over the city in July. On 10 August 1919, a ceasefire was signed.

An American Commission to Negotiate Peace telegram, speaking on the conflict, stated:

F. Tredwell Smith of the American Persian Relief Commission passed through here yesterday after varied experiences in Erivan and Nakhichevan and Tabriz and Urumia. When about August 25th he crossed the Tartar lines via Nakhichevan to Tabriz for the second time the atmosphere was completely changed, and a Britisher's life was no longer safe because the British had no troops, and Americans were also in danger. The Tartars opened battle on the Armenians in Nakhichevan on July 20th and after a three-day battle drove out the British along with the American relief workers and began a massacre of Armenian men, women and children, estimates of victims varying between 6,000 to 12,000.

Fighting resumed in March 1920 and continued until the Sovietization of Nakhichevan in 1920 by the 11th Red Army, now including former Azerbaijan Democratic Republic troops.

=== Fight for Zangezur / Syunik, November 1919 ===
Following the controversial withdrawal of British forces from the Transcaucasus in mid-1919 and the subjugation of the Karabakh Council to Azerbaijan in August 1919, Dr. Khosrov bey Sultanov beseeched his government to help him "overcome 'the Armenian bandits' blocking the routes to the summer grazing lands and to convert his titular position as governor-general of Karabagh and Zangezur / Syunik into reality." His call for assistance was also prompted by the antagonizing reports of Muslim villages in Zangezur / Syunik being pillaged by irregular Armenian forces and their inhabitants fleeing into Azerbaijan as refugees. Accordingly, the Azerbaijani army began to plan its invasion of Zangezur with the strategic objective of reaching the rebelling Nakhichevan and Sharur-Daralagez uyezds and incorporating them into Azerbaijan.

On 3 November 1919, the Azerbaijani army, supplemented by auxiliary Kurdish cavalry, launched a full-scale attack into the Armenian-controlled section of Zangezur / Syunik, and was successful in briefly occupying some bordering Armenian villages before being decisively defeated and forced out by the local Armenians, led by partisan commanders Colonel Shahmazian and Garegin Nzhdeh. A notable historian on the topic, Hovannisian, describes the conflict:

Preliminary skirmishes involving the Kurdo-Tatar partisans of Haji-Samlu were followed by a general Azerbaijani offensive at dawn on November 4. Under cover of a dense fog, the advancing regiments flanked the Armenian forward trenches and captured the first line of defense. By the next afternoon Bayandur, Khnadsakh, Korindzor, and Tegh had fallen, Khoznavar was in flames, and Azerbaijani artillery was bombarding the heights (Kechel-dagh) overlooking Goris. At nightfall Azerbaijani crescent-shaped fires burned on these heights. Elsewhere, Muslim bands from Sharur-Nakhichevan invested Nors-Mazra and other villages near Sisian, and two Turkish-officered platoons cut across the rugged Zangezur mountains from Ordubad into the Muslim stronghold of Okhchichai. Throughout Zangezur the imperiled Muslim population took heart in anticipation of liberation by the Azerbaijani army.

Such hopes were cut short, however, by the counterattack Shahmazian mounted on November 6 after concentrating all available units on the Goris front. Artillerymen ... made direct hits on the Azerbaijani positions on Kechel-dagh, which was recaptured by Armenian companies ... The Kurdish irregulars were the first to break ranks and scatter into the mountains around Minkend, while the Azerbaijani regulars withdrew toward Tegh and the vale of Zabukh. Having gained the initiative, the Armenians charged the Azerbaijani lines, decimating Edigarov's cavalry regiment in cross fire, reportedly inflicting several hundred casualties on the infantry, capturing 100,000 rounds of ammunition and six machine guns near Khoznavar, and putting two cannons and more than twenty machine guns out of commission. By November 9 the Azerbaijani army was retreating in disarray toward Zabukh and the northern mountainous bypaths to Karabagh. Within a week after the invasion began, the Armenians of Zangezur were celebrating an impressive victory.

=== Fight for Karabakh, early 1920 ===
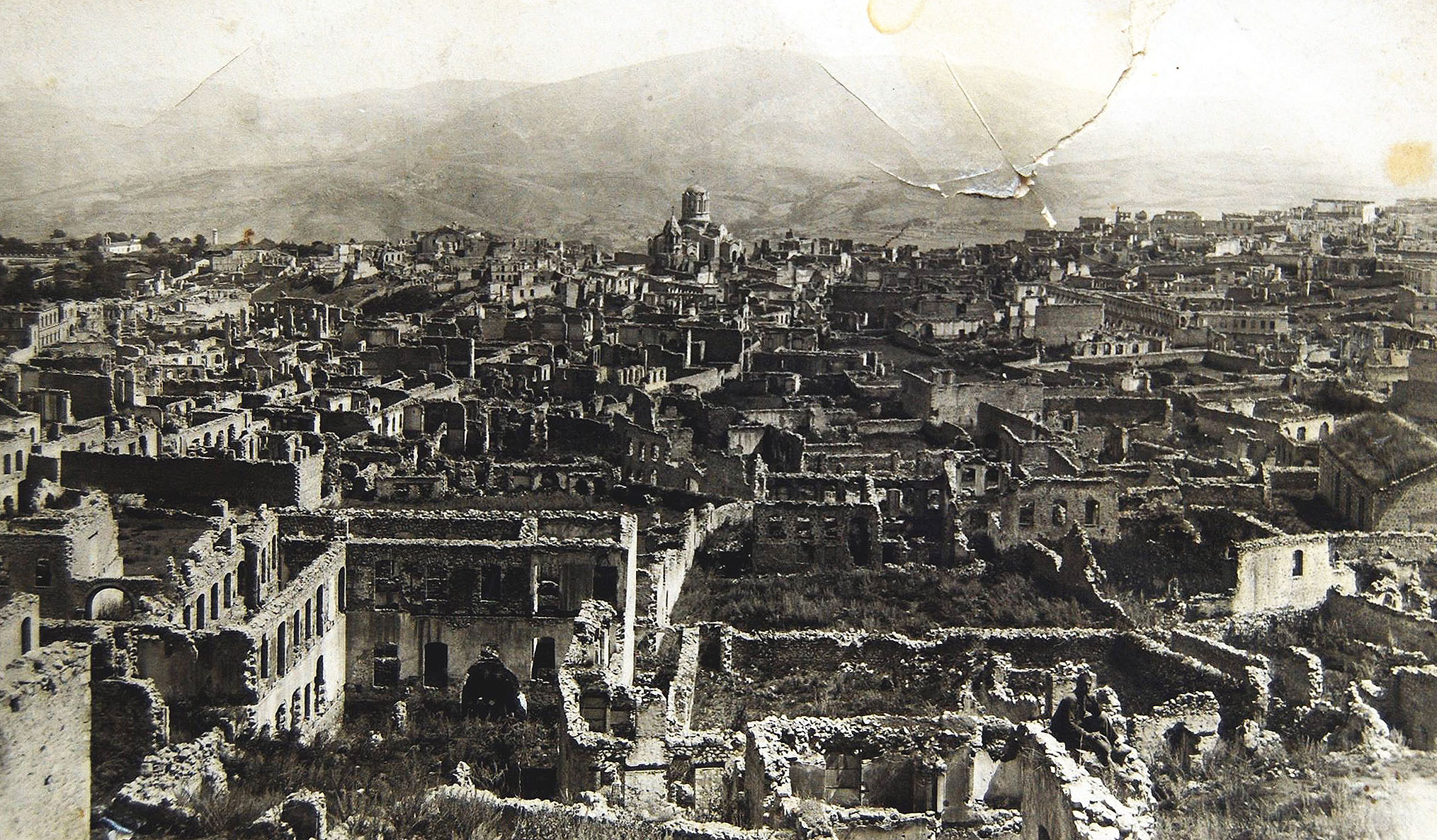
Aftermath of the Shusha massacre of the city's Armenian population: Armenian half of Shusha destroyed by Azerbaijani armed forces in 1920, with the defiled Armenian Cathedral of the Holy Savior on the background.

The largest escalation of the Armenian-Azerbaijani conflict occurred in mid-March 1920 during the botched Karabakh uprising culminating in the massacre and expulsion of Shushi's majority Armenian population. Through 1918–1919, the area of Mountainous Karabakh was under the de facto administration of the local Armenian Karabakh Council, which was supported by the region's overwhelmingly Armenian population. During this period, Azerbaijan attempted several times to assert its authority over the region, backed by the British governor of Baku, Lieutenant General Thomson, who appointed Dr. Khosrov bey Sultanov as governor-general of Karabakh and Zangezur with the intention of annexing the Karabakh Council into Azerbaijan. In 1919, under threat of extermination (demonstrated by the Khaibalikend Massacre), the Karabakh Council was forced to sign an agreement to provisionally recognize and submit to Azerbaijani jurisdiction until its status was decided at the Paris Peace Conference.

Ending in early 1920, the Paris Peace Conference was inconclusive regarding the resolution of the Transcaucasian territorial disputes, and therefore Armenia, by this time in a much stronger position to assert itself, took it upon itself to emancipate the Armenians of Karabakh from their callous Azerbaijani governor. Subversive preparations began for a staged uprising in the region of the Karabakh Council, timed to coincide with Azerbaijani Novruz celebrations. The uprising, due to its poor coordination, was unsuccessful in ousting the Azerbaijani garrisons from Shushi and neighboring Khankend, resulting in a pogrom in Shusha, in which Azerbaijani soldiers and residents burned and looted half of the city, murdering, raping and expelling its erstwhile majority Armenian inhabitants.

After the uprisin, the forces of Garegin Nzhdeh and Dro Kanayan were ordered by the Armenian government to assist the Karabakh rebels, while Azerbaijan moved most of its army westward to crush the Armenian resistance and cut off any reinforcements, despite the threat of the approaching 11th Red Army of Bolshevik Russia from the north. By Azerbaijan's Sovietization barely a month after the uprising began, Azerbaijani forces were able to maintain control over the central cities of Karabakh, Shusha and Khankend, whilst its immediate surroundings were under the control of local partisans supplemented by Armenian army reinforcements. Since Dro had been explicitly ordered by the Armenian Government not to engage the Red Army, he was unable to execute the attack to capture Shusha, whose Azerbaijani defenders had been supplanted by the Red Army. The situation persisted until the overwhelming Bolshevik army drove out the Armenian army detachments from the region, after which the fears of the Armenians of Karabakh were alleviated by virtue of returning to the stability of Russian control.

=== Fight for Kazakh, early 1920 ===
On 5 April 1920, skirmishes began along the Armenian–Azerbaijani border as the governor and commander of Kazakh (Qazax) increased security forces in the region, expecting that the Armenian army would create a diversion to relieve pressure on Karabakh. Azerbaijani forces occupied the heights above the villages of Tatlu (Tatlı) and Paravakar, prompting Armenian residents to dislodge the Azerbaijanis and sparking the two weeks of border battles that saw Azerbaijan capture Kalacha (Berdavan) and Kotkend (Koti) while attacking Tasalu, Dvegh (Dovegh), Koshkotan (Voskevan), and Barana (Noyemberyan) on 7 April. While a cease-fire was negotiated on 9 April, the Azerbaijani army subsequently invaded Tatlu and Lalakend, burning the Armenian villages of Badakend (Ələsgərli) and Chardakhlu (Çardaqlı) on the Azerbaijani side of the border. Azerbaijani Prime Minister Fatali Khan Khoyski accused Armenia of violating the truce by attacking the Azerbaijani settlements of Upper Askipara and Lower Askipara, Salakhli, and 6 other Azerbaijani settlements on April 12. Tensions along the border were ultimately relieved on 18 April when officials from Dilijan and Kazakh agreed on an 11-point ceasefire agreement that included the repatriation of all displaced residents and the restoration of the former boundary.

== Aftermath ==
=== Sovietization of Azerbaijan, April 1920 ===
In early April 1920, the Republic of Azerbaijan was in a very troubled condition. In the west the Armenians still controlled large parts of the territory claimed by Azerbaijan; in the east, local Azerbaijani communists were rebelling against the government; and to the north the Russian Red Army was steadily moving southward, having defeated Denikin's White Russian forces.

On 27 April 1920, the government of the Azerbaijan Democratic Republic received notice that the Soviet Army was about to cross the northern border and invade Azerbaijan. Faced with such a difficult situation, the government officially surrendered to the Soviets, but many generals and local Azerbaijani militias continued resisting the advance of Soviet forces, and it took a considerable time for the Soviets to stabilize the newly proclaimed Azerbaijan Soviet Socialist Republic, headed by the leading Azerbaijani Bolshevik Nariman Narimanov.

While the Azerbaijani government and army were in chaos, the Armenian army and local Armenian militias used the opportunity to assert their control over parts of Azerbaijani territory, invading Shusha, Khankendi, and other important cities. By the end of April, Armenian forces were controlling most of western Azerbaijan, including all of Karabakh and surrounding areas. Other occupied areas included all of Nakhichevan and much of the Kazakh-Shamshadin district. In the meantime, Armenian communists attempted a coup in Armenia, but ultimately failed.

=== Soviet takeover, May 1920 ===
In 1920–21, the only solution to this dispute could come either by military victory—as basically happened in Anatolia, Zangezur and Nakhichevan—or by the imposition from above of a new structure by an imperial power. After the British failed to impose a settlement, the imperial arbiters turned out to be the Bolsheviks, whose 11th Army conquered Karabakh in May 1920. On 5 July 1921, the Bolsheviks' Caucasian Committee, the Kavbiuro, under the chairmanship of Joseph Stalin decided that the mountainous part of Karabakh would remain under the jurisdiction and sovereignty of Azerbaijan. In July 1923, the Nagorny (or Mountainous) Karabakh Autonomous Region (NKAO) was established within Azerbaijan, with borders that gave it an overwhelming Armenian majority of 94% of the total inhabitants.

=== End of hostilities, September–November 1920 ===
In late November there was yet another Soviet-backed communist uprising in Armenia. On 28 November, blaming Armenia for the invasions of Şərur on 20 November 1920 and Karabakh the following day, the 11th Red Army under the command of Gen. Anatoliy Gekker, crossed the demarcation line between First Republic of Armenia and Soviet Azerbaijan. The second Soviet-Armenian war lasted only a week.

=== Sovietization of Armenia, December 1920 ===
On 4 December 1920, when the Red Army entered Yerevan, the government of the First Republic of Armenia effectively surrendered. On 5 December, the Armenian Revolutionary Committee (Revkom), made up of mostly Armenians from Azerbaijan, also entered the city. Finally, on 6 December, Felix Dzerzhinsky's dreaded secret police, the Cheka, entered Yerevan, thus effectively ending all existence of the First Republic of Armenia.

The Armenian Soviet Socialist Republic was then proclaimed, under the leadership of Gevork Atarbekyan. On 18 February 1921, a national revolt against the Bolsheviks started. Gen. Garegin Nzhdeh, commander Garo Sasouni and the last Prime Minister of independent Armenia Simon Vratsyan took the lead of the anti-Bolshevik rebellion and forced out the Bolsheviks from Yerevan and other places. By April, the Red Army reconquered most part of Armenia. However, Atarbekyan was dismissed and Aleksandr Miasnikyan, an Armenian high-ranking Red Army commander, replaced him. Garegin Nzhdeh left the Zangezur mountains after the Sovietization of Armenia was finalized in July 1921, leaving Azerbaijani-populated villages cleansed of their population. Persuaded by Soviet leadership, Zangezur had already been ceded by Azerbaijan to Armenia in November 1920 as a "symbol of friendship".

=== Treaty of Kars, 23 October 1921 ===
The violence in Transcaucasia was finally settled in a friendship treaty between Turkey and the Soviet Union. The peace Treaty of Kars was signed in Kars by representatives of the Russian SFSR, Azerbaijan SSR, Armenian SSR, Georgian SSR and Turkey. Turkey had another agreement, the "Treaty on Friendship and Brotherhood", also called the Treaty of Moscow, signed on 16 March 1921 with Soviet Russia.

By this treaty, Nakhichevan was granted the status of an autonomous region under Azerbaijan's protectorate, on the condition that the rights for the protectorate would never be transferred to a third state. Turkey and Russia became guarantors of Nakhichevan's status. Turkey agreed to return Alexandropol to Armenia and Batumi to Georgia.
