= 2012 Armenian local elections =

Local elections were held in Armenia on 12 February and 9 September 2012.

== February elections ==
The February elections saw the ruling Republican Party of Armenia retain control of thirty cities.

== September elections ==
The September local elections were held in 438 municipalities, including Gyumri where Samvel Balasanyan of Prosperous Armenia was elected mayor. Voter turnout averaged 49.52%, ranging from 15% in Gai to 93.8% in Aravus.

A total of 716 candidates contested the mayoral positions, of which 342 were members of the Republican Party, 289 were independents, 48 were members of Prosperous Armenia, 20 were members of the Armenian Revolutionary Federation and twelve were from the Rule of Law party.

=== Gyumri ===
Candidate	Votes	%
Samvel Balasanyan	27,500	64.91
Hovsep Simonyan	10,281	24.27
Andranik Avetisyan	2,458	5.80
Spartak Petrosyan	2,130	5.03
Invalid/blank votes	3,359	–
Total	45,728	100
Registered voters/turnout	125,657	36.39
Source: Caucasus Election Watch
