= Sevada Grigoryan =

Armenian artist

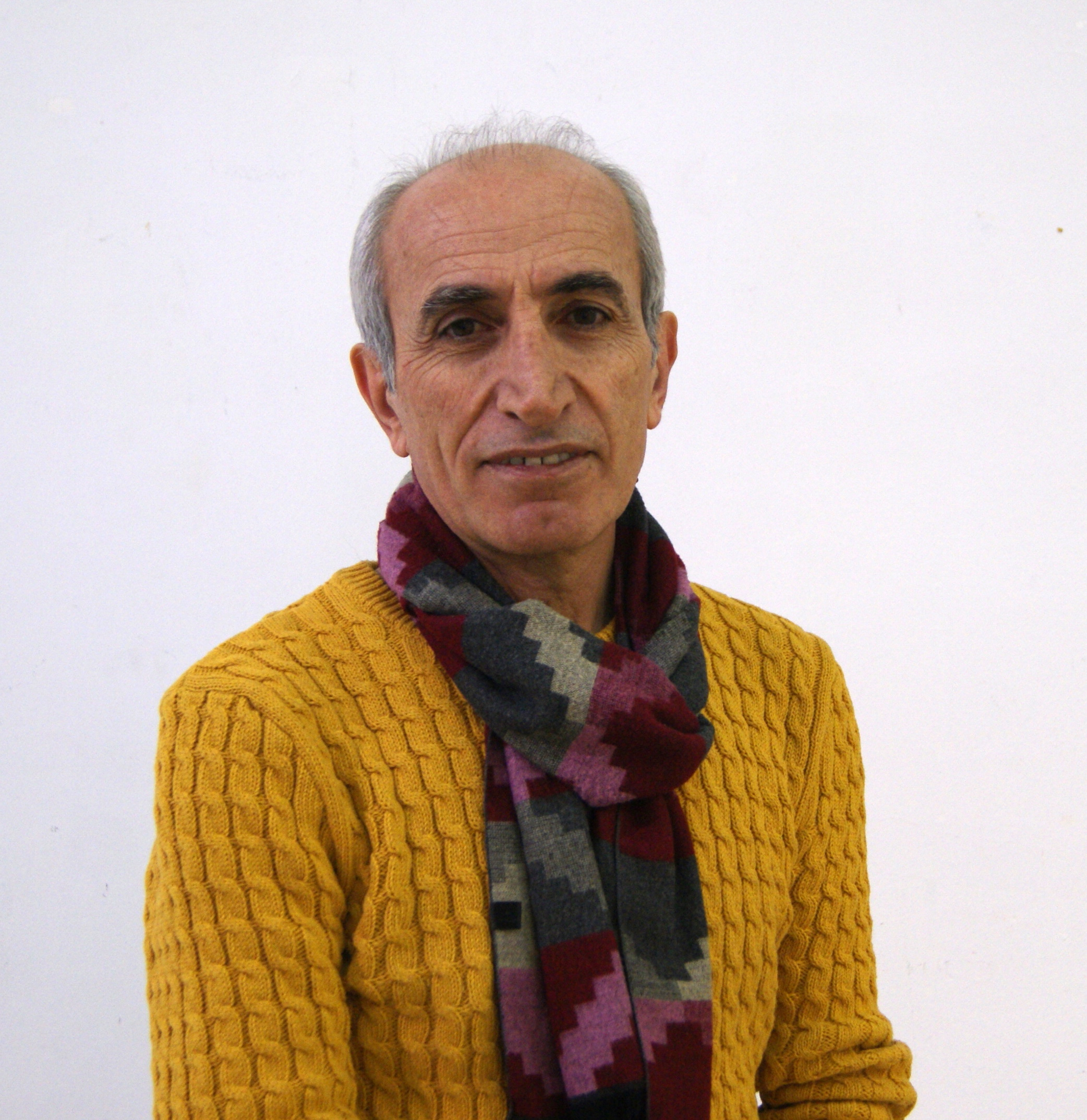
- Born: September 13, 1959 (age 66); Karashen, Goris, Armenia
- Known for: Painter www.sevada.am

Sevada Grigoryan (Armenian: Սևադա Գրիգորյան; born September 13, 1959, in the village of Karashen in Goris), is an Armenian artist. He is known for his colorful and detailed paintings of figurative folk compositions.

== Biography ==
=== Early life ===
Sevada was born in the southern village of Karashen in Goris, Armenia. Although in his early childhood, his family moved to the mountain resort town of Jermuk, Sevada still spent most of the summer vacations in the village with his grandparents.

=== Education ===
Sevada started drawing from his school years. He earned his degree in painting from Yerevan State Pedagogical University after Kh. Abovyan. On his own initiative, he later attended painting courses at Riga State Academy of Fine Arts. After returning to his hometown, Sevada was granted a private studio by the Municipality of Jermuk. Parallel to his painting career, Sevada taught at the town's Art School for 10 years.

== Experience ==
Sevada Grigoryan is a member of Armenian Artists' Union since 1992 and a member of "UNESCO" International Federation of Artists in France since 1995.

== Exhibitions ==
Sevada broke into the international art scene in 2004, when his painting "Madonna with the Child" was exhibited in Hyogo Prefectural Museum of Art in Kobe, Japan. The painting was one of the hundred selected artworks from a pool of 8000 submitted works by 3000 artists from 81 countries.

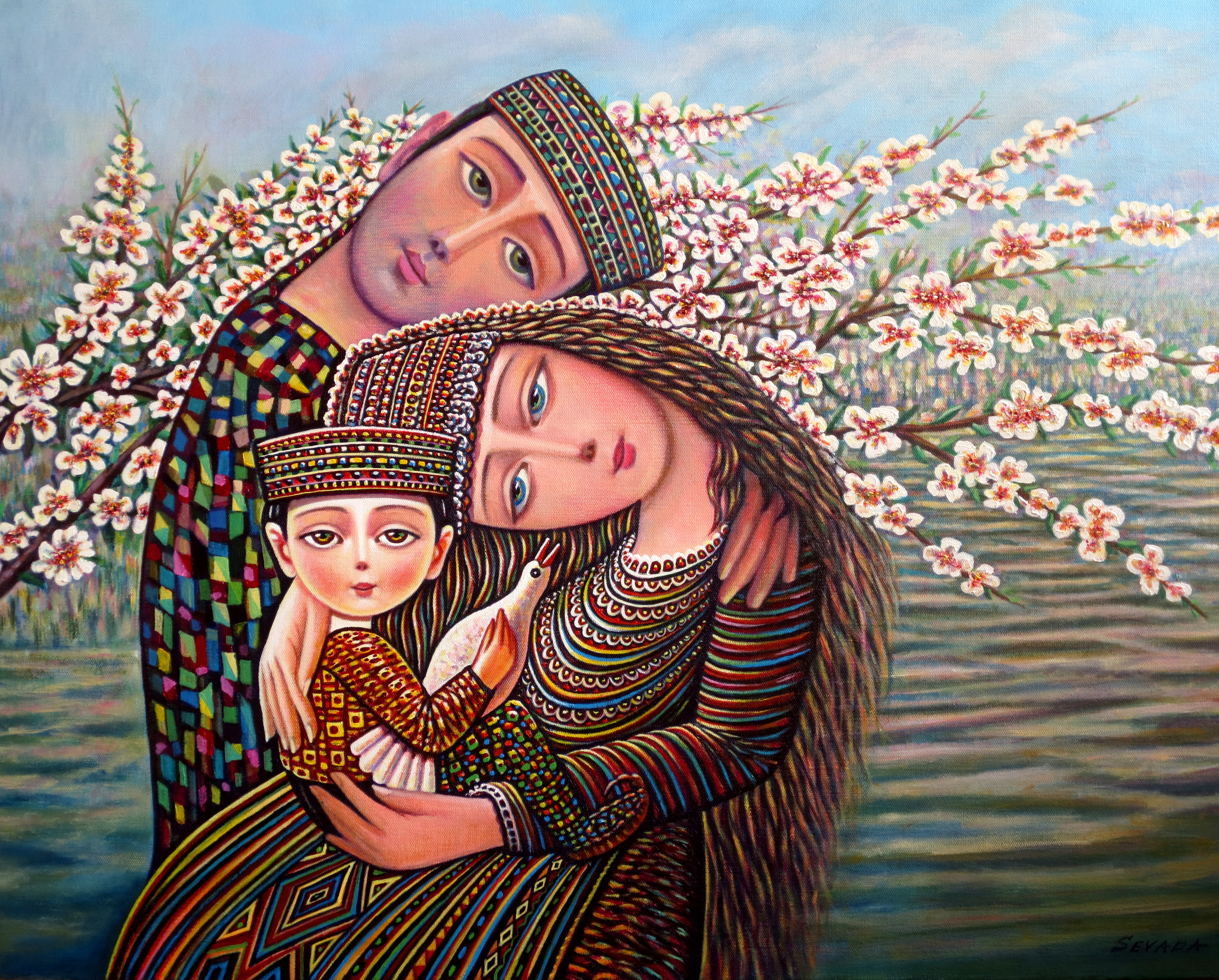
The Apricot has Blossomed

Sevada Grigoryan has held exhibitions throughout Russia, China and the US at venues such as the Central House of Artist in Moscow and "Datian Art" Gallery at M50 art district in Shanghai, China.

== Collections ==
Some of Sevada's paintings are kept in public collections, among them Sandy Education District in Salt Lake City, Russian Embassy in Armenia, Municipality of Karlovy Vary in Czech Republic, Armenia's United Nations Dining Hall, Armenian Apostolic Church in Pyatigorsk, Russia and Jermuk City Municipality.

== Style ==
Sevada's early paintings touched upon many genres: landscape, still life, portraits, religious themes and more. He mainly used oil paints, also occasionally pastel and gouache. Those older paintings featured thicker layers of oil paints that signified his laborious and detailed style that is still present in his works today.

The current style, which Sevada is most famous for, was only developed in the 2000s. The shift came after he found interest in acrylic paints. As the artist often recalls: “Oil paints dried slowly, which increased the waiting period for putting the next stroke. And I couldn’t wait… I was too impatient.” Thus, with the fast drying characteristic and the brighter colors of acrylic paints, Sevada found a new medium that could better express his vision. Subsequently, the layers were reduced, giving space to more detailed patterns. His new affinity for acrylic paint would lead to changes in Sevada's thematic compositions.

== Themes ==
Sevada's paintings are often symbolic in nature, which he accomplishes through representational compositions that resemble a fairy tale or epic story. One of the central subjects of Sevada's paintings is family. Sevada believes that harmony in the family should be similar to that of nature. Sevada's love of nature is seen in many of his paintings, where various nature scenes with different birds and animals co-exist with his characters. Sevada also devotes a substantial portion of his paintings to religious themes. He strongly believes that the beauty along with faith will save the world. Sevada's artworks are filled with elements of regional folk culture. The influence of Armenian miniature painting can also be found in his paintings. Sevada puts a significant emphasis on the dresses and costumes of his characters, which always contain highly intricate details and patterns. Sevada himself recalls his creative process in the following way: “Through the years, various memories, events, and impressions go through a process of crystallization inside of me, and eventually pass to another state of existence: my artworks.”

== Fashion ==
Sevada's paintings have also found their way into the fashion industry. Since 2014, German-based ethnic street wear fashion brand SINOIAN has been producing a special line of T-shirts named the "Sevada Collection". The T-shirts feature various cropped out characters and details from Sevada's paintings.

== 2014 – present ==
In 2014 Dong Dong and LuLu artist residency invited Sevada Grigoryan to live in Nanjing, China. He accepted the invitation and has since participated in multiple exhibitions in cities throughout China, including Shanghai, Ningbo, Changsha and Jiashan. Sevada is currently living in China, where he continues to paint and regularly participate in local and international exhibitions.

== See also ==
- List of Armenian artists
- List of Armenians
