= Samvel Balasanyan =

Armenian politician

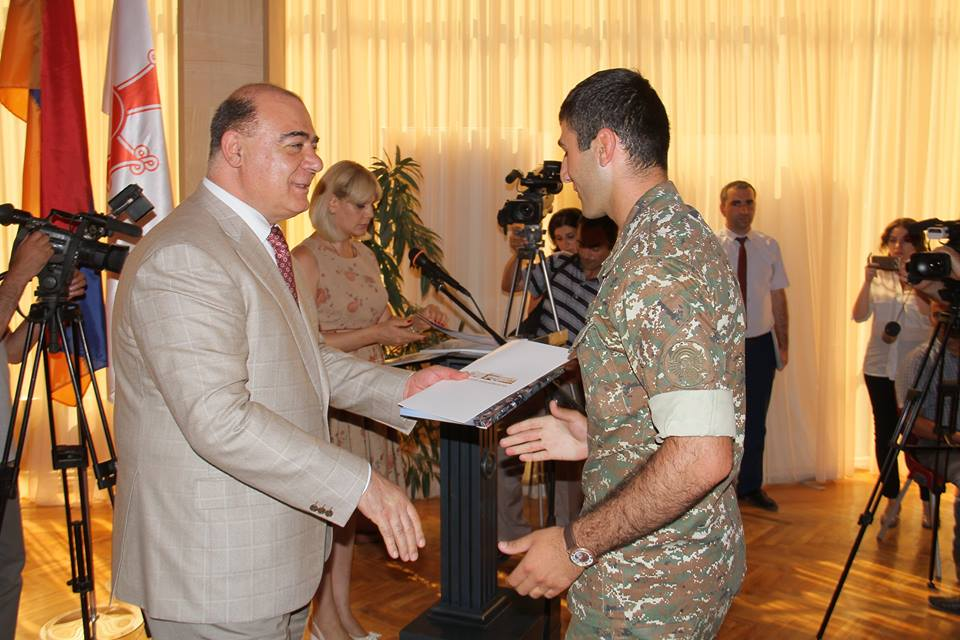
Image of Samvel

Samvel Balasanyan is an Armenian politician. He was the mayor of Gyumri and a former Deputy Speaker of National Assembly of Armenia.

== Early life ==
Balasanyan was born on October 12, 1954, in Gyumri, which was named Leninakan at the time. Mr. Balasanyan graduated from Leninakan Nalbandyan State Pedagogical Institute in 1976 and the Moscow Food Production Institute in 1983.

== Career ==
From 1976 to 1977, he served in the Soviet Army. In 1977, he started his career as a worker in the Leninakan Beer Factory and in 1978 was appointed as a technologist at the Confectionery Factory. From 1992 to 1999, he served as the appointed director of the Beer Factory.

=== Political activity ===
1999-2003 was his first term as a deputy in the National Assembly (electoral district # 63) where he served first on the NA Standing Committee on Social, Health Care and Environmental Protection Affairs and later on the National Assembly Standing Committee on Foreign Relations. He was first a member of the Stability Deputy Group and later People's Agricultural and Industrial Union.

From 2003 to 2007 he was a deputy in the NA (electoral district #49). He was a member of the NA Standing Committee on Financial-Credit, Budgetary and Economic Affairs. Head of the Ad-hoc Committee on Determining the Options for the Savings Deposits of Citizens of the Republic of Armenia in “Armsberbank.” He was the head of the Rule of Law Faction.

In 2006, he was awarded the Medal of Honour of the National Assembly of Armenia. On May 12, 2007, he was elected to the National Assembly from electoral district #35. He is the Deputy Head of the "Prosperous Armenia" party. On October 7, 2010, he was elected vice president of the National Assembly.

On September 9, 2012, having more than 60% of the votes, he was elected as the mayor of the second largest city in Armenia - Gyumri.

On March 5, 2015, he announced that he will no longer be a member of the "Prosperous Armenia" party.

Balasanyan is a key figure within the Balasanyan Alliance Social Party.

== Personal life ==
Mr. Balasanyan is married and has three children. Besides his career as a politician, he is also a teacher, mathematician and food technologist.
