= SINOIAN =

Armenian fashion brand

- SINOIAN | More than fashion
- Product type: Ready-to-wear; Clothing; Accessories
- Current owner: Emin Bolbolian
- Country: Germany
- Introduced: 2013
- Markets: Worldwide
- Tagline: More than fashion
- Website: www.sinoian.com

SINOIAN is an Armenian luxury fashion brand established in Germany in 2013. It is the first Armenian streetwear brand focussing on creating high-end ready-to-wear streetwear fashion based on Armenian design elements.

Notable celebrities who have worn SINOIAN clothing in public or got to know the brand include Charles Aznavour, Ontronik Khachaturian, Genealogy, Vahe Tilbian, Armenchik, Lilit Hovhannisyan and Vahe Berberian. SINOIAN has created and established the abbreviation "YRVN" for Armenia's capital Yerevan through its fashion pieces.

== History ==
The brand was founded by Armenian designer Emin Bolbolian who was born in Wuppertal, Germany. Bolbolian graduated from the renowned Folkwang University of the Arts and came up with the idea of a modern Armenian themed ready-to-wear fashion brand in early 2012. SINOIAN designs visually combine traditional cultural design elements of the Armenian nation with modern fashion trends; with a fresh, contemporary feel. The brand stands for quality, style and class and is a fashion label that extends beyond aesthetics by combining tradition, fashion and art. SINOIAN appeals to the conscience of the people. At a time when nations are growing apart from each other SINOIAN is building a bridge between tradition and the modern age.

== Eurovision ==
In May 2015 SINOIAN was chosen to represent Armenia at the first-ever Eurovision fashion show "Fashion For Europe" in Vienna. The SINOIAN fashion house successfully presented eight pieces of its new collection during the show. Other participants were amongst others Michael Michalsky for Germany, Galia Lahav for Israel, Ivana Helsinki for Finland, Agnesa Vuthaj fashion for Albania, Calzedonia for Italy and more. The fashion show was televised and attracted up to 10.000 visitors.

== Collaboration ==
In an exclusive collaboration with renowned Armenian artist Sevada Grigoryan his paintings have become fashion pieces for the very first time. The "Sevada Collection" by SINOIAN is based on the paintings of Sevada Grigoryan. The collection consists of six designer T-shirts, both for women and men.
