= Tegh Municipality =

Tegh Տեղ
- Rural Community
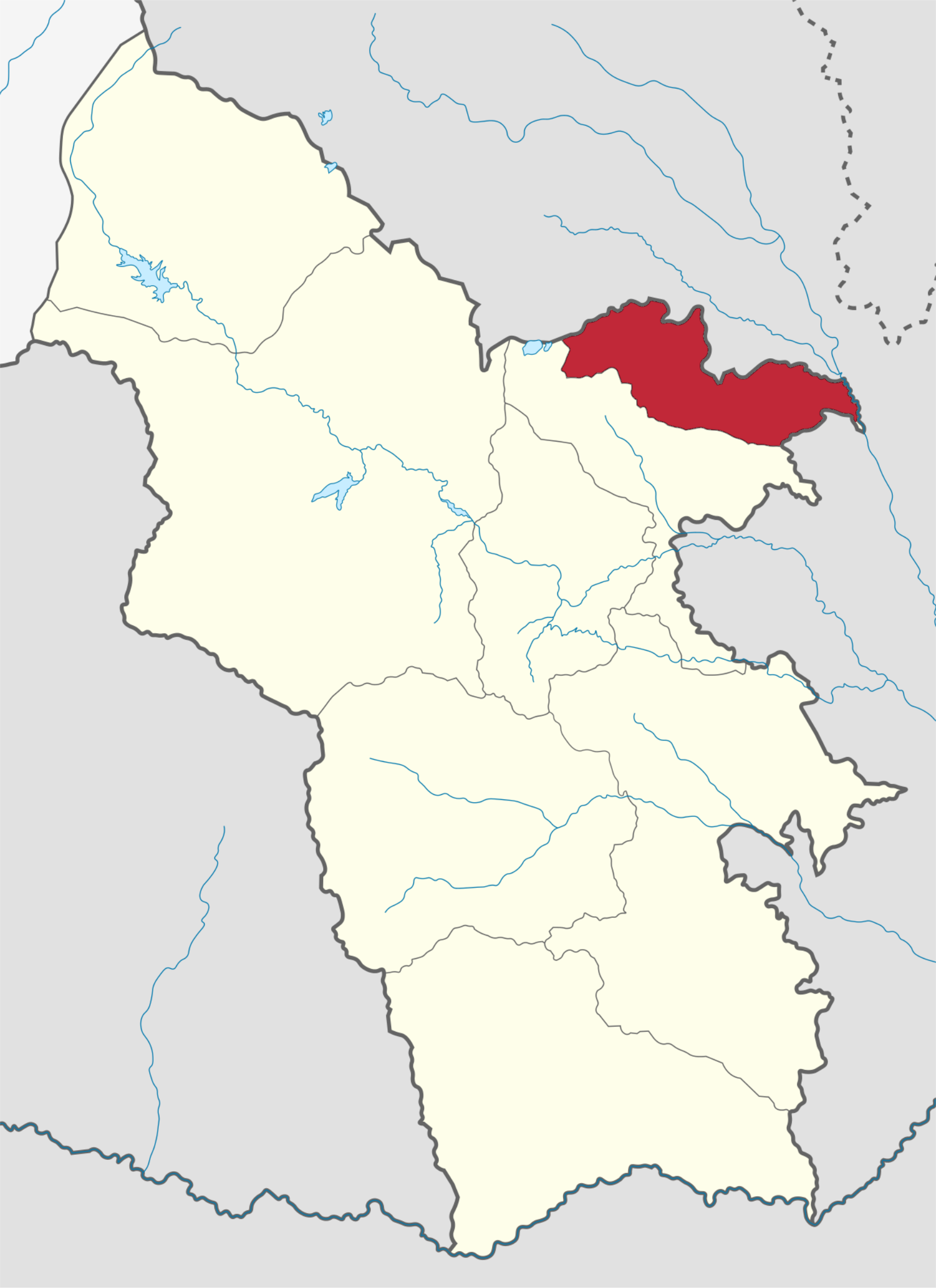
- Coordinates: 39°35′N 46°26′E
- Country: Armenia
- Province: Syunik
- Formed: 17 June 2016
- Administrative centre: Tegh

Government
  - Mayor: Davit Ghulunts

Population (2011 census)
  - Total: 5,994
- Time zone: AMT (UTC+04)
- Postal code: 3201–3519
- ISO 3166 code: AM-SU
- FIPS 10-4: AM08

Tegh Municipality, referred to as Tegh Community (Armenian: Տեղ Համայնք Tegh Hamaynk), is a rural community and administrative subdivision of Syunik Province of Armenia, at the south of the country. Consisted of a group of settlements, its administrative centre is the village of Tegh.

== Included settlements ==
Settlement	Type	Population (2011 census)
Tegh	Village, administrative centre	2,443
Aravus	Village	171
Karashen	Village	550
Khnatsakh	Village	998
Khoznavar	Village	396
Kornidzor	Village	1,100
Vaghatur	Village	336

== Politics ==
Tegh Municipal Assembly (Armenian: Տեղի համայնքապետարան, Teghi hamaynqapetaran) is the representative body in Tegh Municipality, consisting of 15 members which are elected every five years. The last election was held in October 2021. Davit Ghulunts of Civil Contract was elected mayor.

Party	2021	Current Municipal Assembly
**Civil Contract**	**10**	
Country of Living	**5**	
Total	15	

Ruling coalition or party marked in bold.

== See also ==
- Syunik Province
