= Balasanyan Alliance Social Party =

Balasanyan Alliance Social Party Բալասանյան դաշինք
- Leader: Samvel Balasanyan
- Founded: 2016
- Headquarters: Gyumri

Website
- Facebook page

The Balasanyan Alliance Social Party, also known as the Balasanyan Alliance (Armenian: Բալասանյան դաշինք) is an Armenian political party.

== History ==
The Balasanyan Alliance Social Party was founded in 2016 and is led by Misak Balasanyan and his father, Samvel Balasanyan who is a former member of Prosperous Armenia.

In September 2016, the party participated in municipal elections in Gyumri, winning 34.75% of the popular vote.

On 17 October 2021, the party participated in municipal elections in the city of Gyumri. The party won 14 seats on the Gyumri city council. The party's mayoral candidate was Vardges Samsonyan, who became mayor of Gyumri on 4 November 2021. Prior to the election, the party decided not to form any political alliances with any of the other participating forces. However, following the elections both the Civil Contract Party and the National Christian Party offered support in order to form a majority in the city council.

The party has never participated in national elections.

== Ideology ==
The party supports the sustainable development of Gyumri and improving infrastructure and roads in the city.

== See also ==
- Programs of political parties in Armenia
