= Karashen =

Karashen Քարաշեն
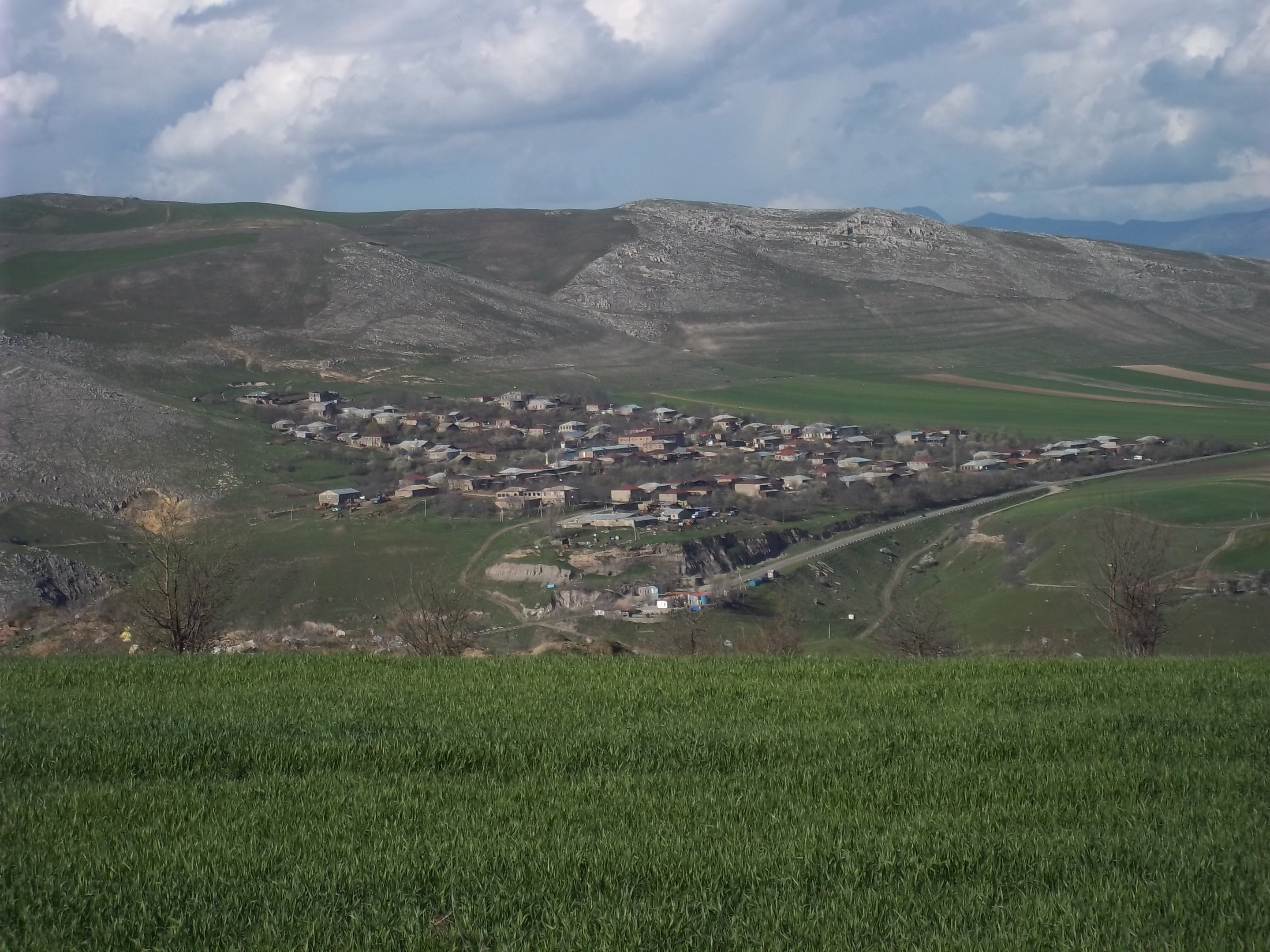

- Location within Armenia Location within Syunik Province
- Coordinates: 39°32′24″N 46°24′29″E
- Country: Armenia
- Province: Syunik
- Municipality: Tegh

Area
  - Total: 13.82 km^{2} (5.34 sq mi)

Population (2011)
  - Total: 550
  - Density: 40/km^{2} (100/sq mi)
- Time zone: UTC+4 (AMT)

Karashen (Armenian: Քարաշեն) is a village in the Tegh Municipality of the Syunik Province in Armenia.

== Geography ==
The village is located in the central-eastern part of the province, a short distance from the Vorotan River – a tributary of the Aras River, which, in turn, is a tributary of the Kurá – and the border with Azerbaijan.

== Demographics ==
The Statistical Committee of Armenia reported its population was 640 in 2010, up from 576 at the 2001 census.

== Gallery ==
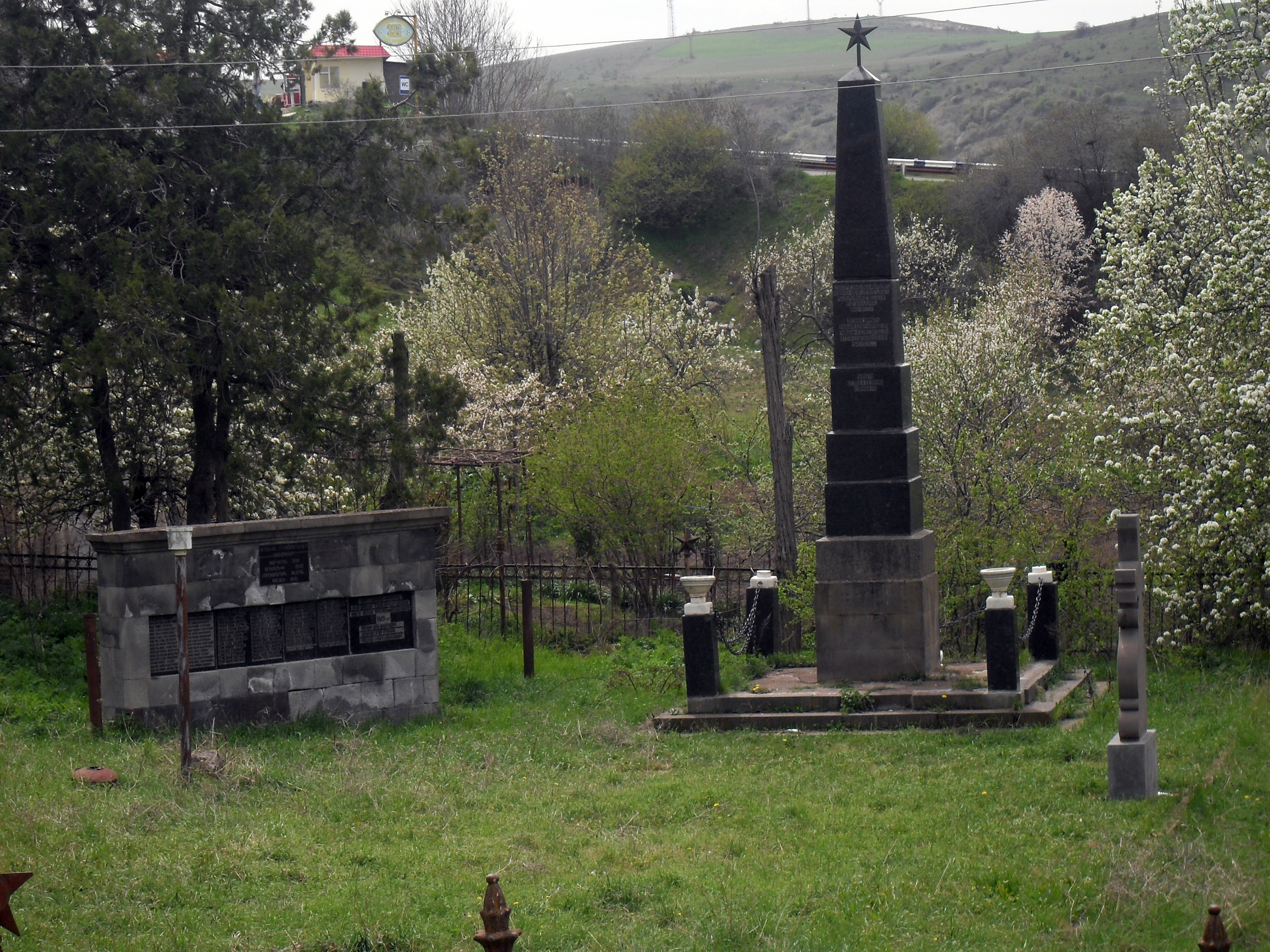
WWII monument in Karashen
