= Vaghatur =

Vaghatur Վաղատուր
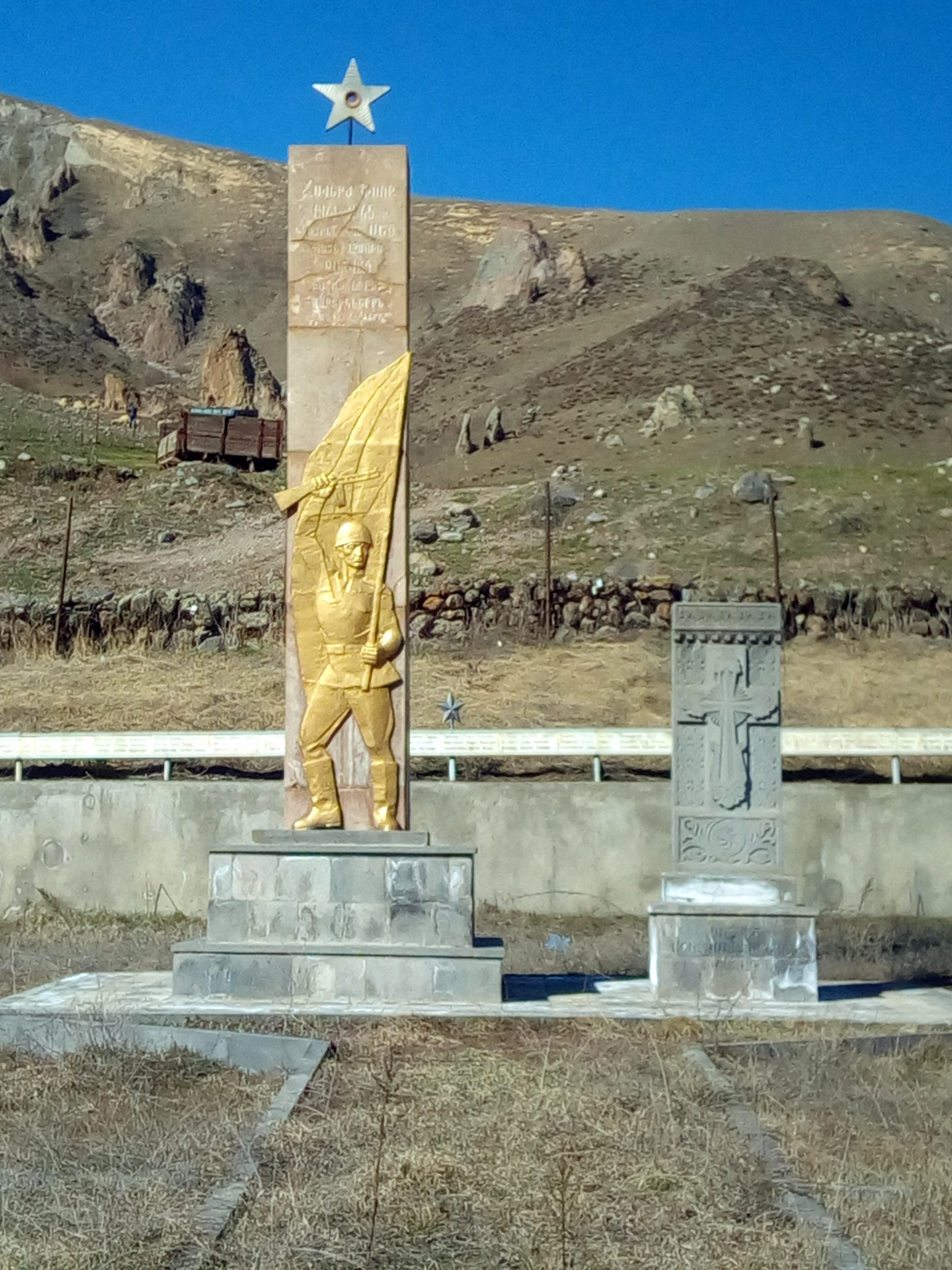
- WWII monument in Vaghatur

- Location within Armenia Location within Syunik Province
- Coordinates: 39°36′12″N 46°22′05″E
- Country: Armenia
- Province: Syunik
- Municipality: Tegh

Area
  - Total: 17.15 km^{2} (6.62 sq mi)

Population (2011)
  - Total: 336
  - Density: 19.6/km^{2} (50.7/sq mi)
- Time zone: UTC+4 (AMT)

Vaghatur (Armenian: Վաղատուր) is a village in the Tegh Municipality of the Syunik Province in Armenia.

== Toponymy ==
The village was previously known as Bayandur, a tribal name which originates from Bayandur tribe of Oghuz Turks.

== Geography ==
It is located in the central-eastern part of the province, a short distance from the Vorotan River – a tributary of the Aras River, which, in turn, is a tributary of the Kurá – and the border with Azerbaijan.

== Demographics ==
The Statistical Committee of Armenia reported its population was 476 in 2010, up from 458 at the 2001 census.

== Gallery ==
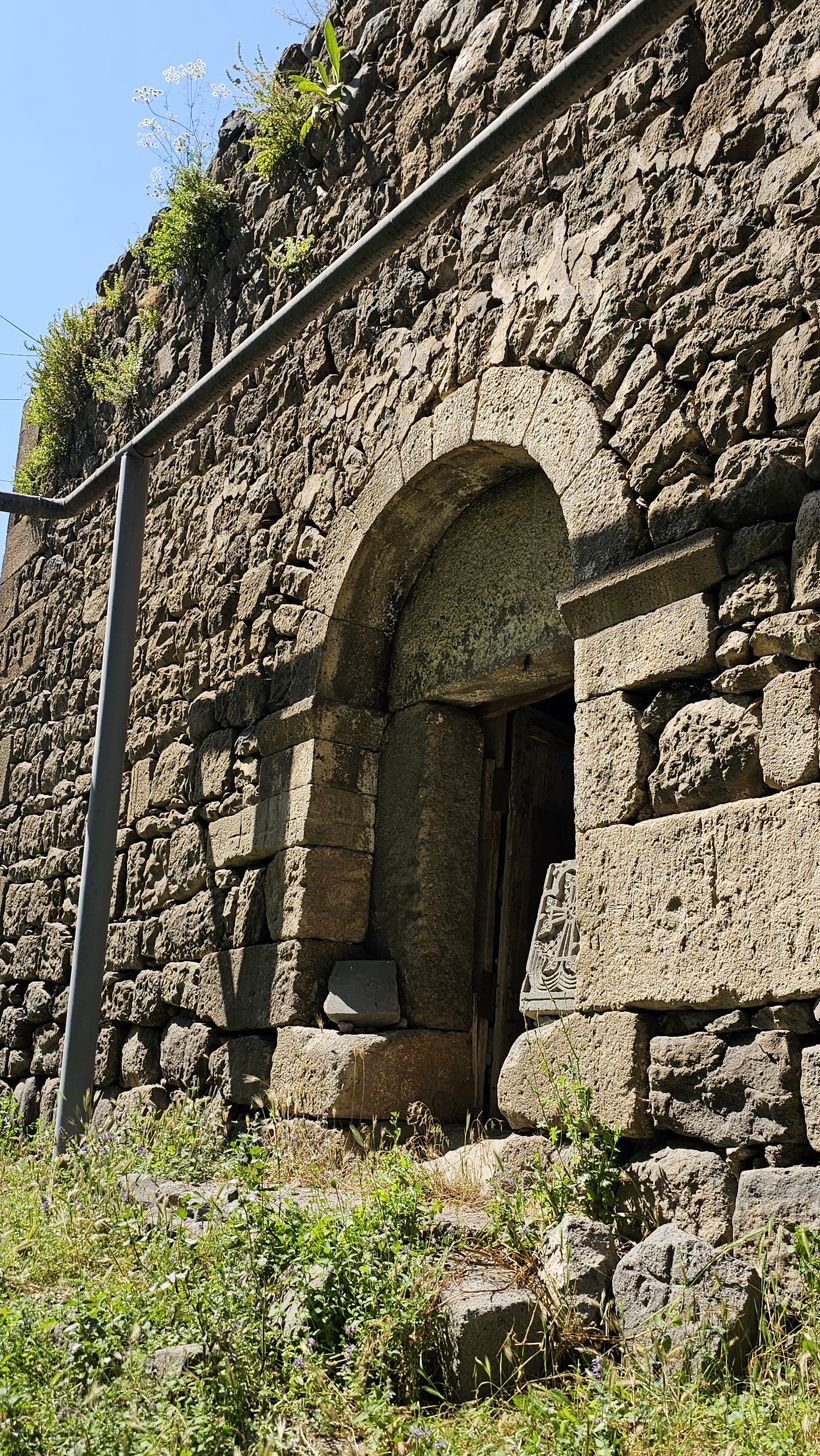

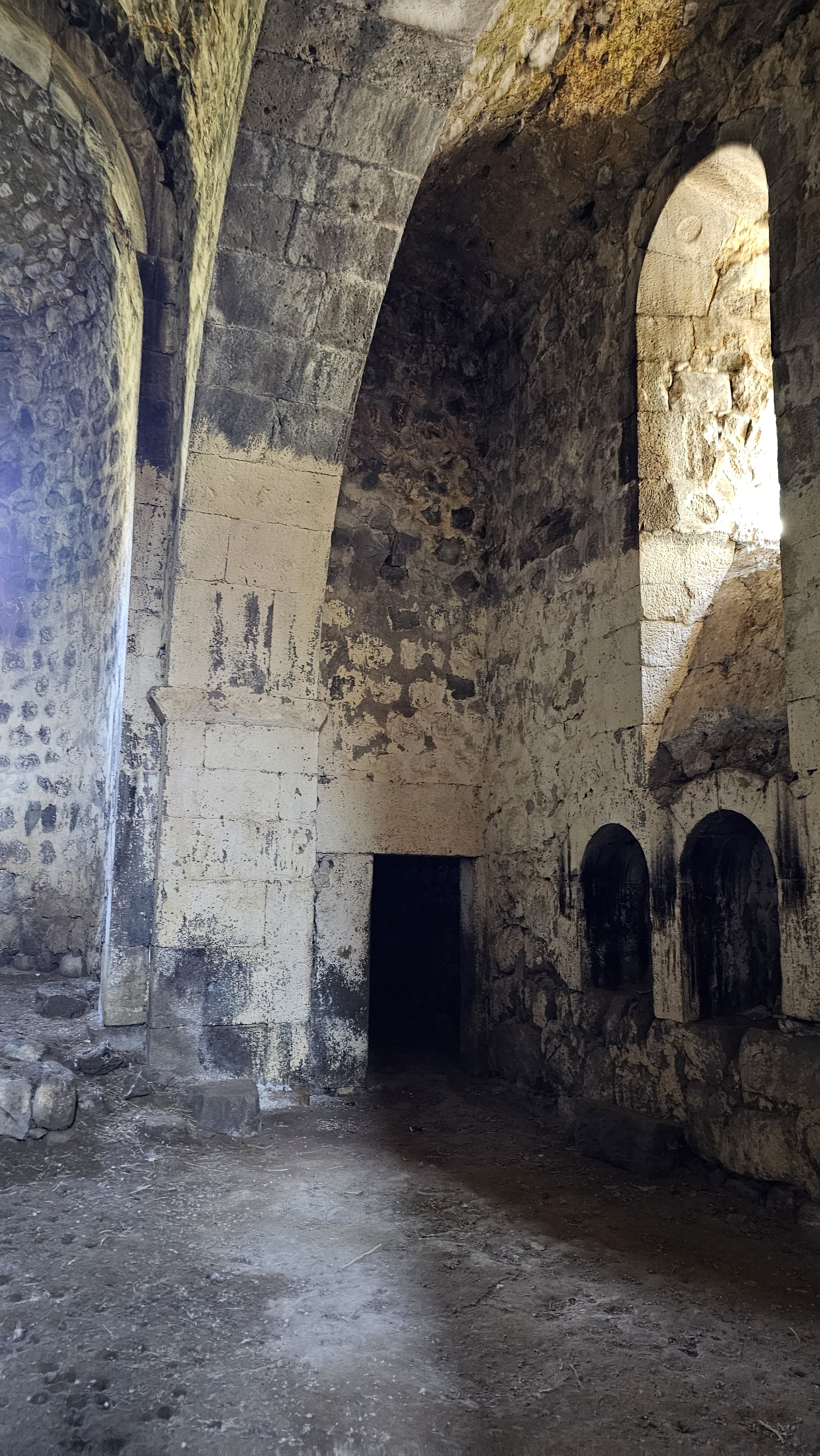
