= Khoznavar =

Khoznavar Խոզնավար
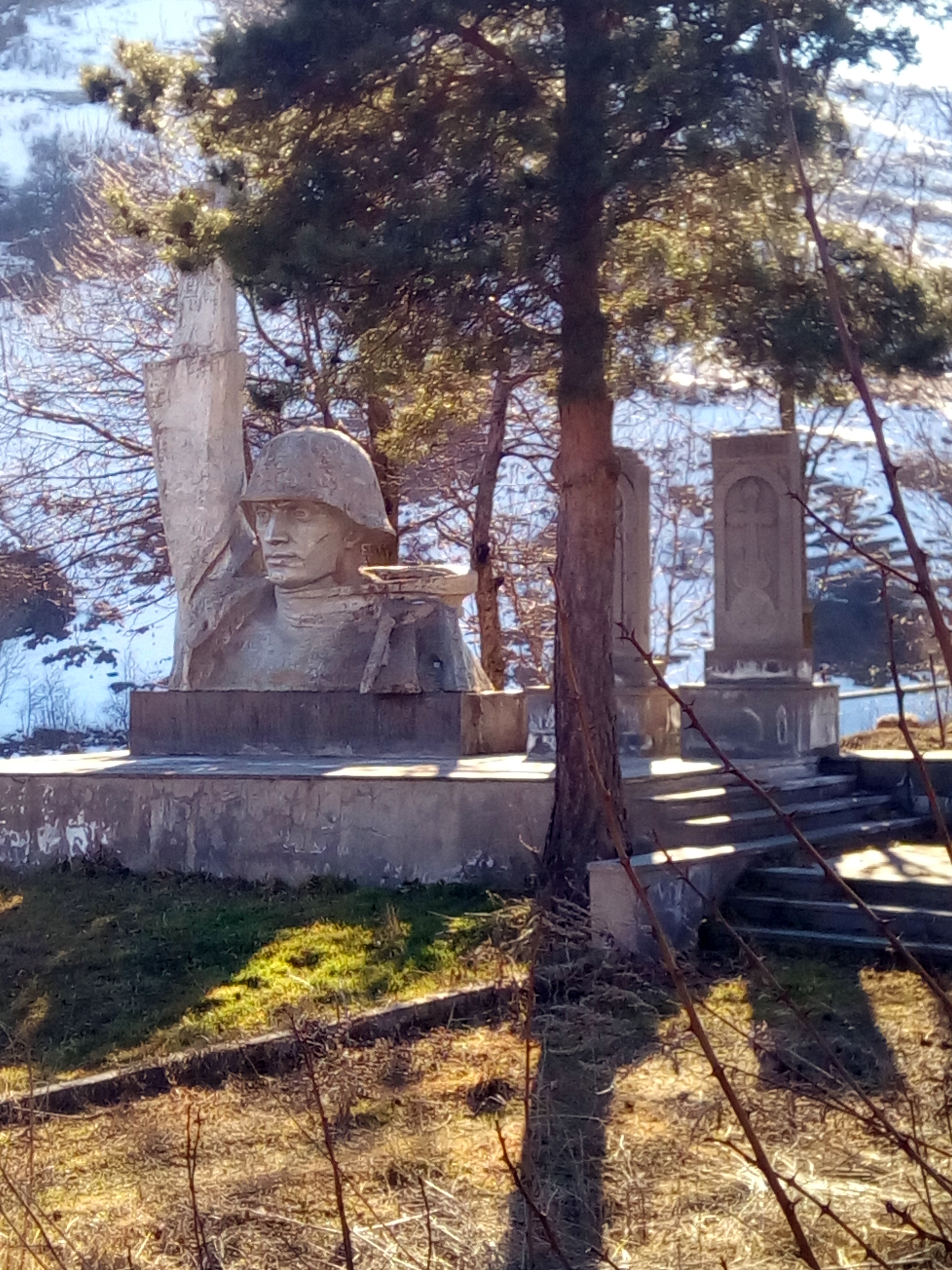
- WWII monument in Khoznavar

- Location within Armenia Location within Syunik Province
- Coordinates: 39°37′17″N 46°21′21″E
- Country: Armenia
- Province: Syunik
- Municipality: Tegh

Area
  - Total: 16.22 km^{2} (6.26 sq mi)

Population (2011)
  - Total: 396
  - Density: 24.4/km^{2} (63.2/sq mi)
- Time zone: UTC+4 (AMT)

Khoznavar (Armenian: Խոզնավար) is a village in the Tegh Municipality of the Syunik Province in Armenia.

== Demographics ==
The Statistical Committee of Armenia reported its population as 407 in 2010, down from 458 at the 2001 census.
