= Aravus =

Aravus Արավուս
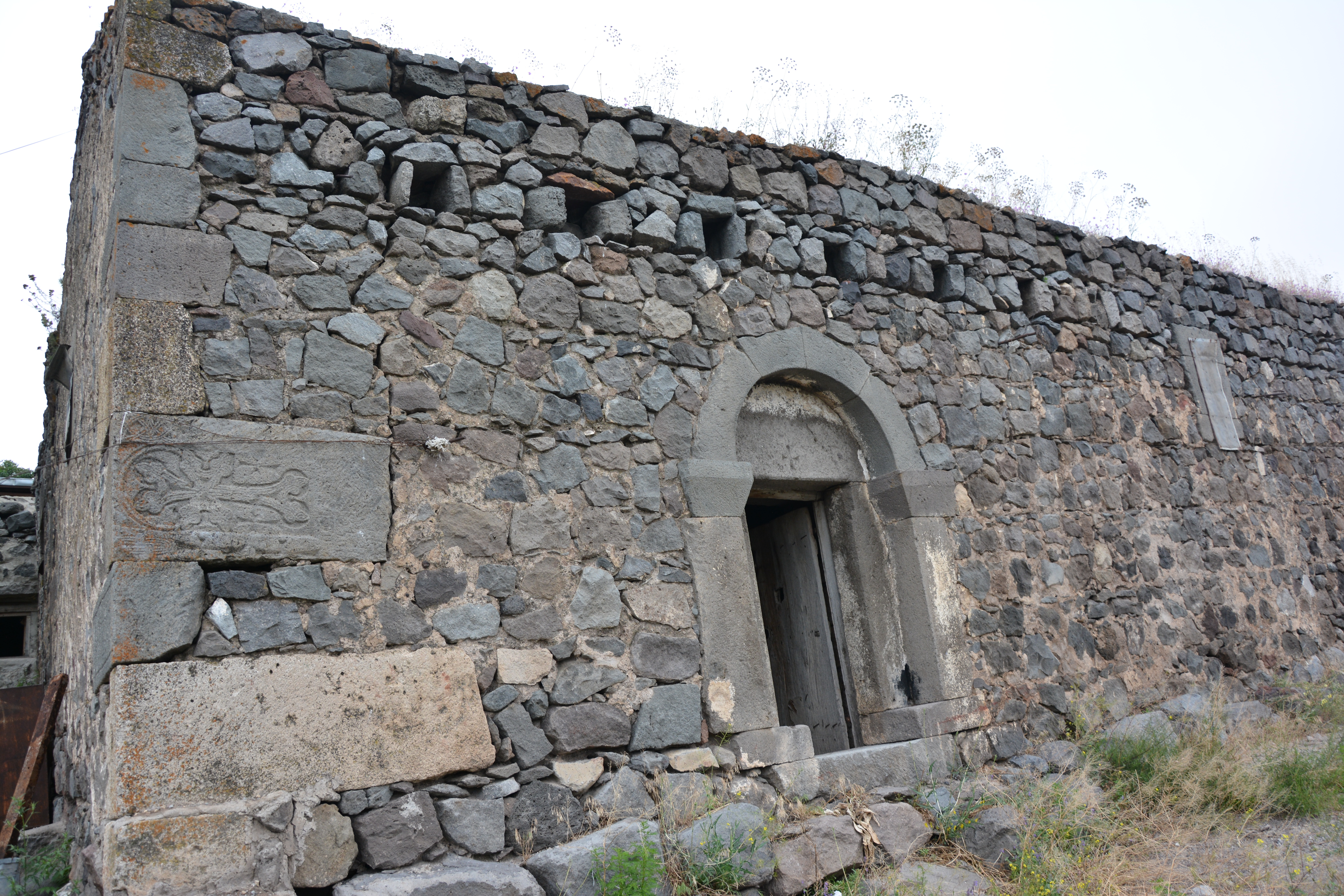
- Church in Aravus

- Location within Armenia Location within Syunik Province
- Coordinates: 39°33′46″N 46°28′02″E
- Country: Armenia
- Province: Syunik
- Municipality: Tegh

Area
  - Total: 4.43 km^{2} (1.71 sq mi)

Population (2011)
  - Total: 171
  - Density: 38.6/km^{2} (100/sq mi)
- Time zone: UTC+4 (AMT)

Aravus (Armenian: Արավուս) is a village in the Tegh Municipality of the Syunik Province in Armenia.

== Demographics ==
The Statistical Committee of Armenia reported its population as 227 in 2010, an increase from 168 at the 2001 census.
