= Tegh =

Tegh Տեղ
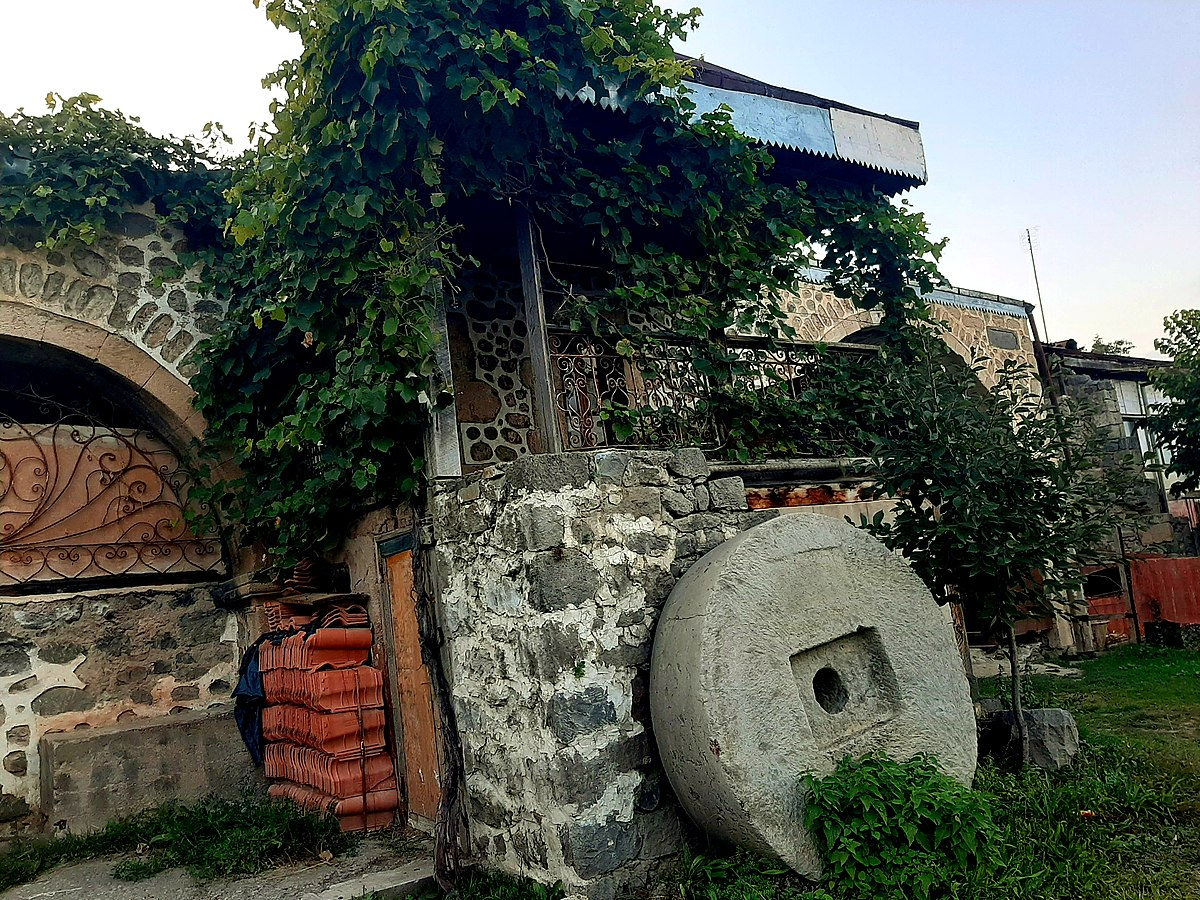
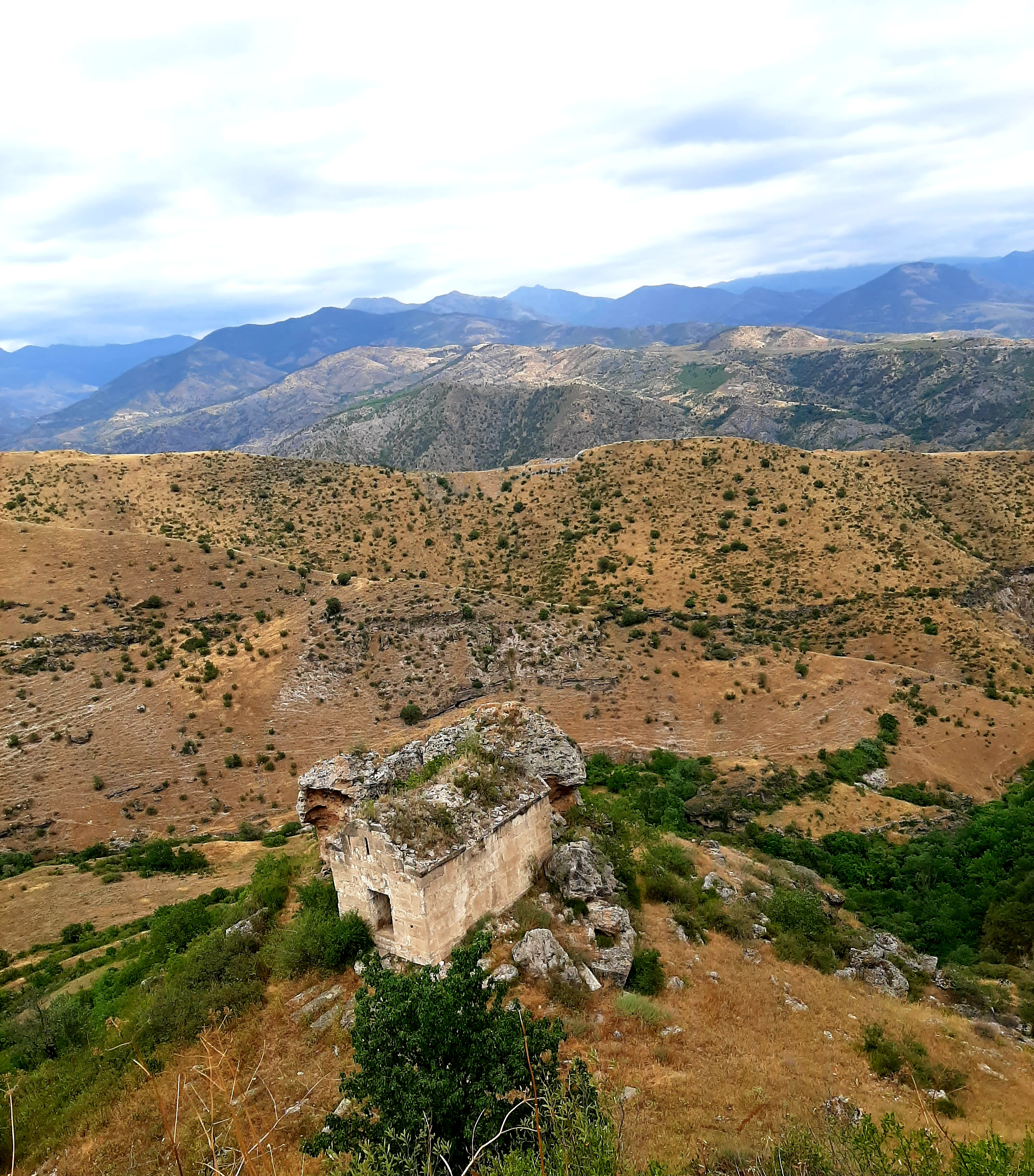
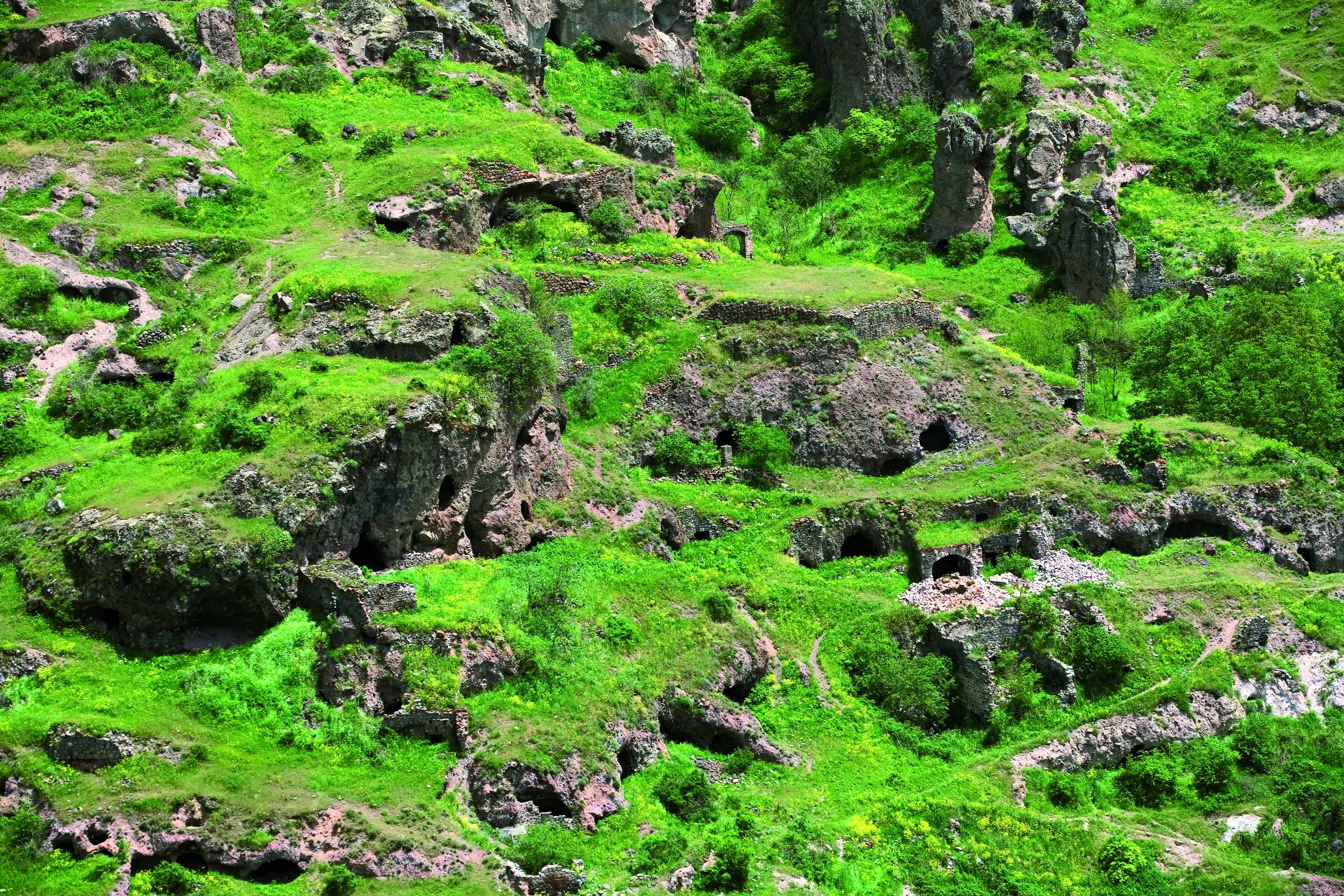
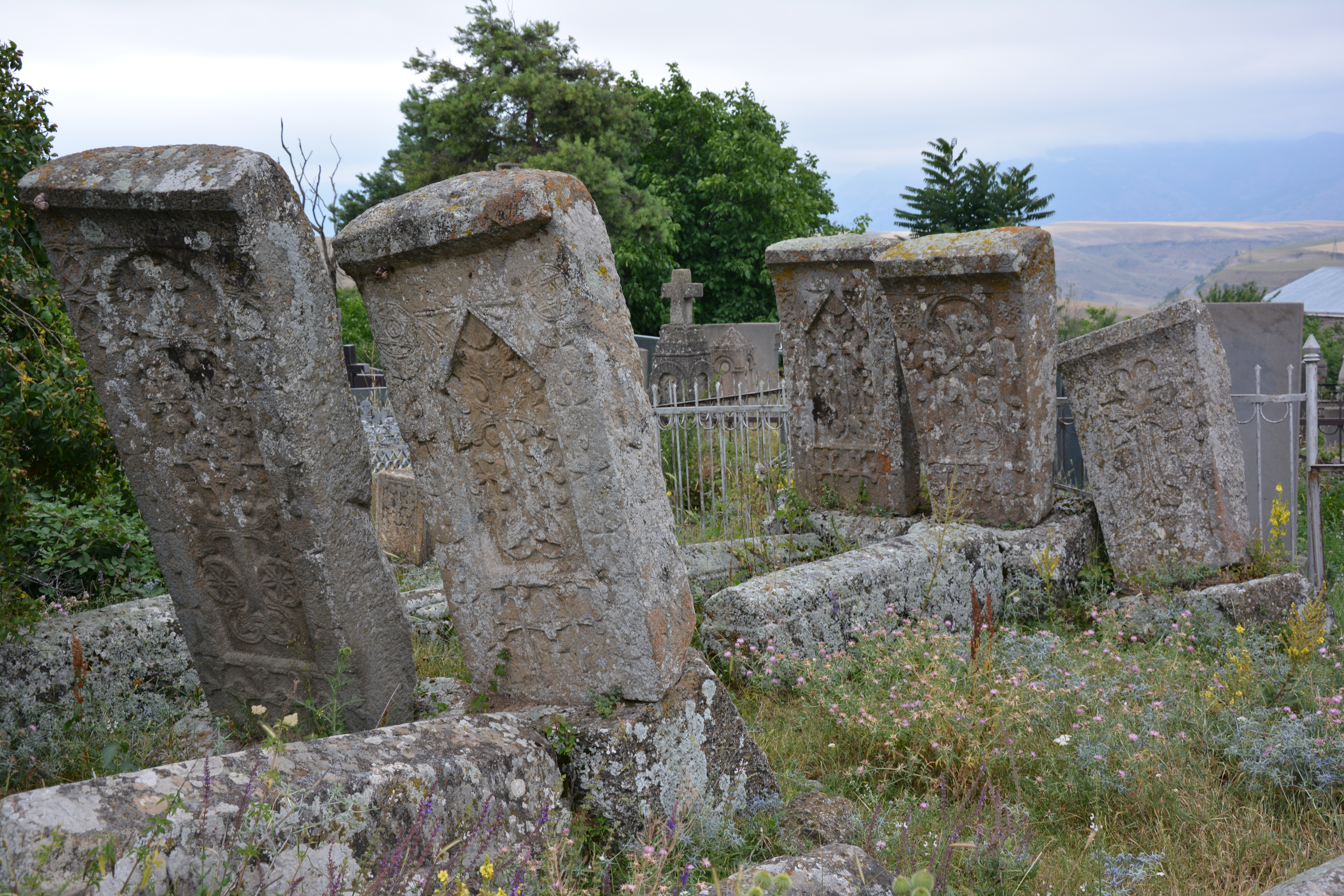
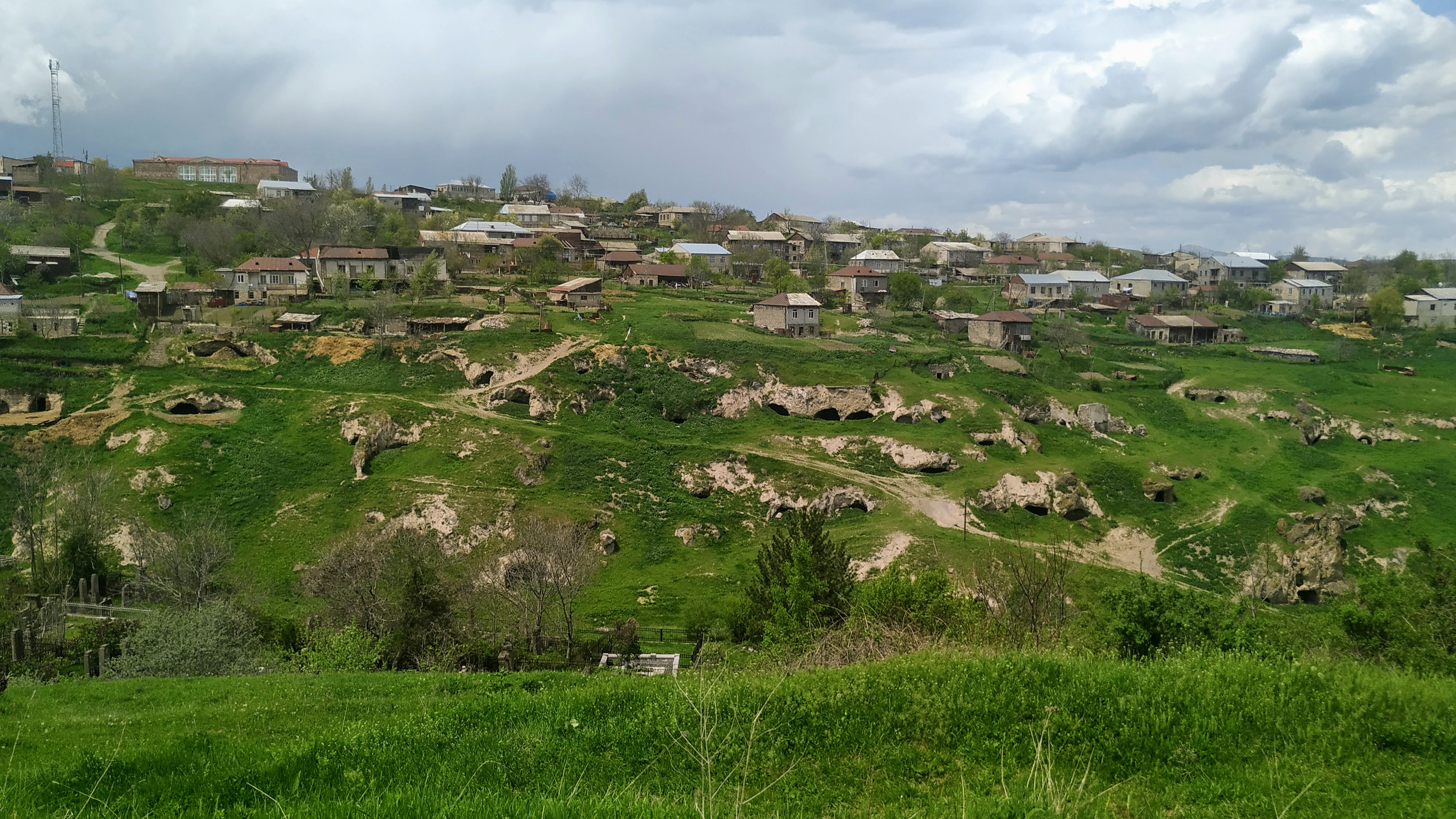
- Amarath Palace House of Movses Khorenatsi Cave city Medieval Khachkars View of Tegh skyline and landscape

- Location within Armenia Location within Syunik Province
- Coordinates: 39°33′17″N 46°28′33″E
- Country: Armenia
- Province: Syunik
- Municipality: Tegh

Population (2011)
  - Total: 2,443
- Time zone: UTC+4 (AMT)

Tegh (Armenian: Տեղ) is a village and the center of the Tegh Municipality of the Syunik Province in Armenia.

Of significance in the village, are the dozens of visible caves present near Tegh. The village is underlaid by a soft stone layer of porous rock, replete with rows of caves that were once used for human habitation, now largely used for animals. There are also some very large ones facing highway M12. Rows of them are visible from the highway while driving east.

The surrounding areas of the village are currently being occupied by Azerbaijan as of 31 March 2022.

== Toponymy ==
The name of the village comes from its Old Armenian name of Տեղ (Teł), first mentioned by Stepanos Orbelian in the 11th century, which evolved into its modern name of Տեղ (Teġ). It is an Armenian word meaning place or locality (see տեղ for further etymological development). In certain Turkic and Russian sources of the 19th century, the name is spelled Dyg, which is the turkicized pronunciation of the native Armenian name.

== History ==
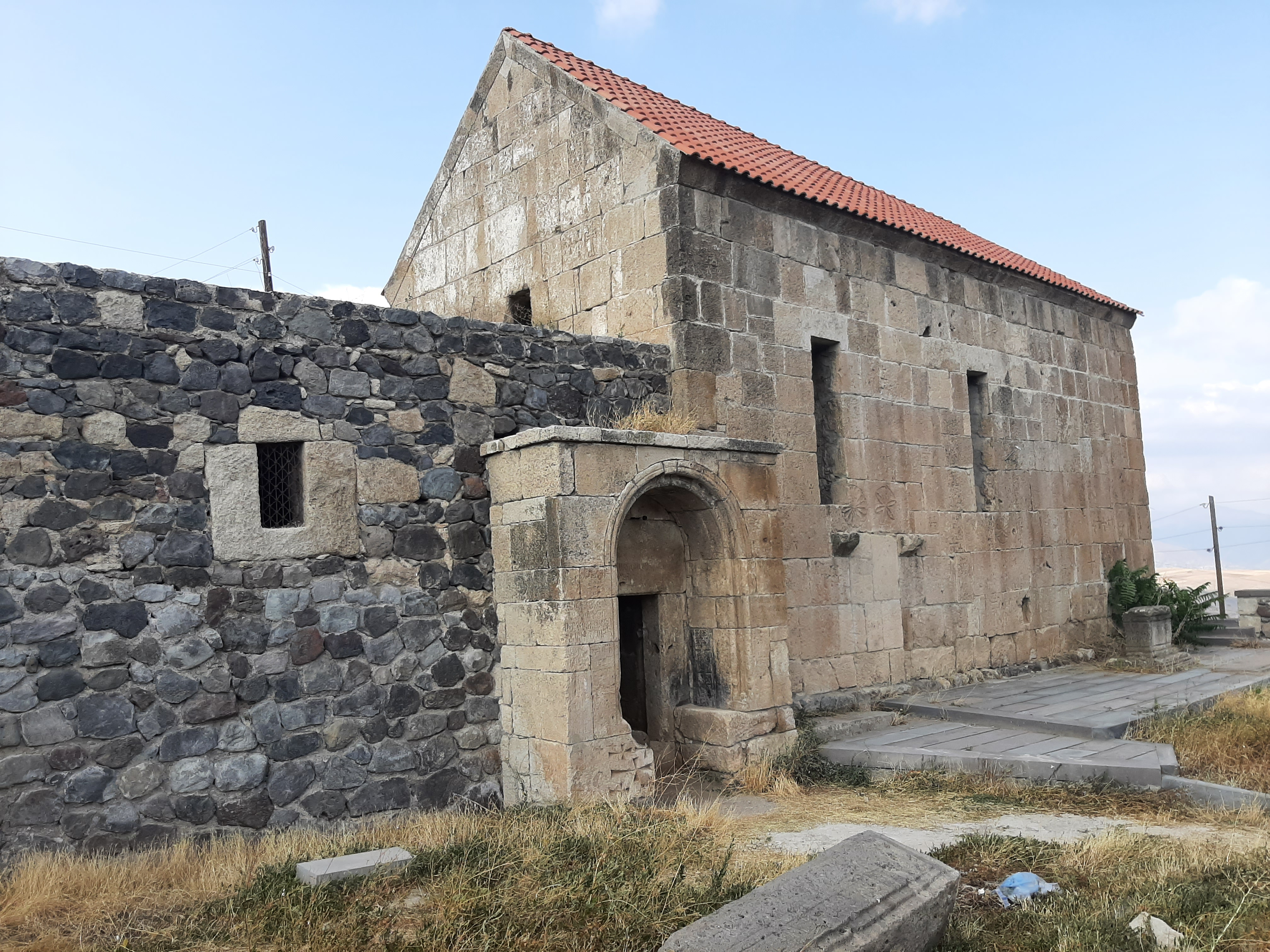
St. Gevorg Church in Tegh (4th-5th centuries)

The oldest structure of the village is the St. Gevorg Church, an Armenian Apostolic church built partly in the 4th-5th centuries while the rest was built in 1737. The settlement of Tegh was originally part of the Haband gavar (district) of the historical Syunik province of the Kingdom of Armenia. According to medieval Armenian historian and Syunik native Stepanos Orbelian, the village was founded by Armenian Queen Shahandukht, ruler of the lands of Syunik, who gifted it to the Tatev Monastery in 998 AD in honor of her late husband, King Smbat of Syunik. Tegh is mentioned in the old tax records of the 13th century as paying 12 units (drams) to the Tatev Monastery.

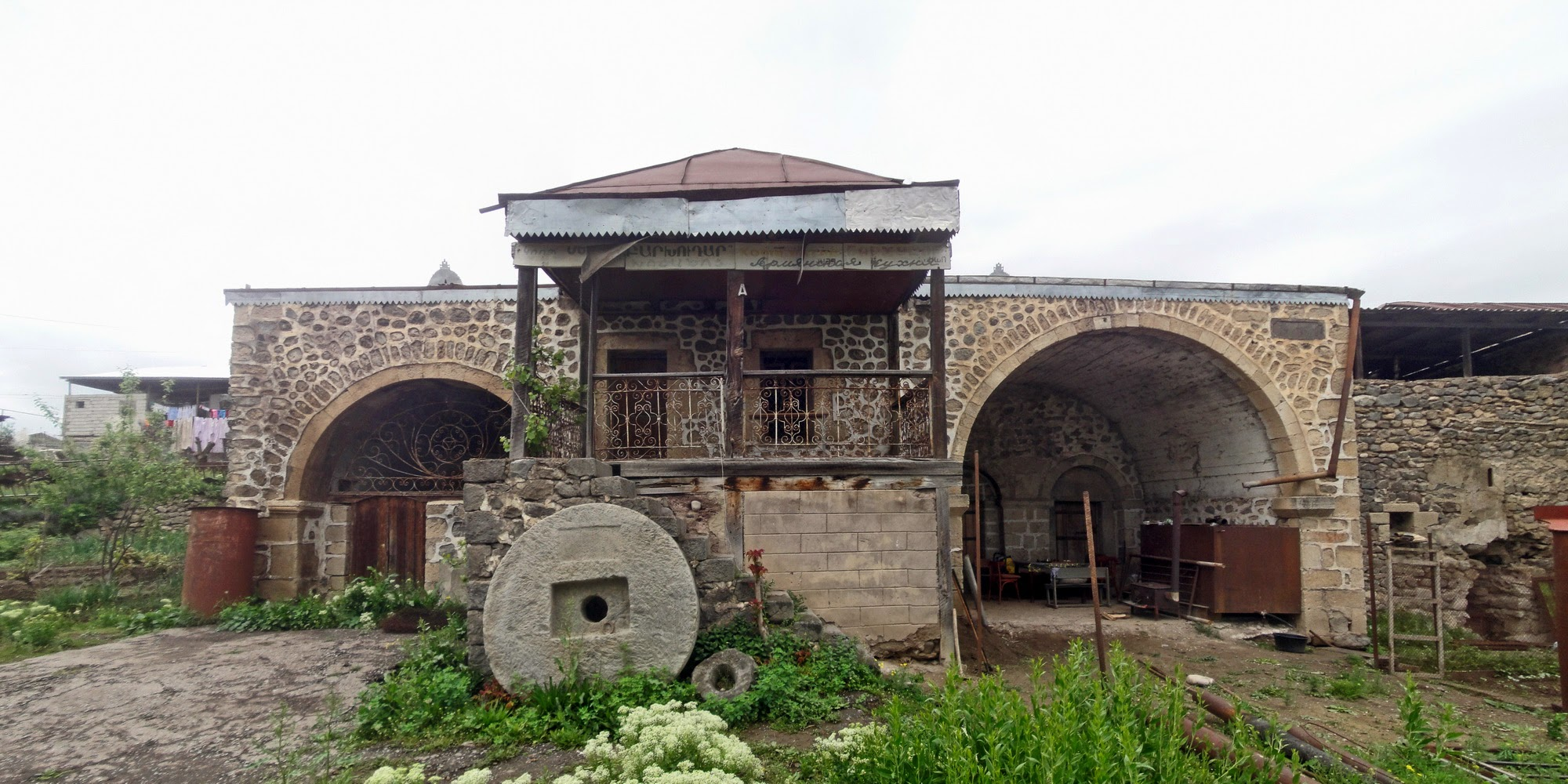
Amarath palace of the Melik-Barkhudaryans (1783)

At the beginning of the 18th century, the region was the centre of the Armenian liberation campaign led by David Bek against Safavid Persia and the invading Ottoman Turks. Due to the Syunik rebellion, Tegh again returned to Armenian rule under the Principality of Kapan (1722-1730). In particular, Tegh was the birthplace of Melik (prince) Barkhudar, the prince of Tegh and an Armenian commander at the forefront of the Armenian liberation movement alongside David Bek. In 1748, Melik Barkhudar’s son, Davit Bek Melik-Barkhudaryan, named after his fathers comrade, succeeded his father to the Melik throne and continued to locally rule Tegh until the end of the century. By 1750, the region again fell under Iranian suzerainty as part of the newly-formed Karabakh Khanate. The local prince Davit Bek Melik-Barkhudaryan built his palace in the village of Tegh in 1783 from where he ruled the village and its surroundings. The Armenian inscription on the palace reads:

ԹՎ ՌՄԼԲ (1783) Ի վաելուսն Մէլիք Բարխուդարի որթի Դավիթ Պէկս Շինեցի այս ամարաթս Իբրայիմ խանի ժամանակօվ [TV RMLB (1783) I Melik Barkhudar's son, Davit Bek, built this Amarath in the time of Ibrahim Khan.]

At the turn of the century, Tegh became part of the Russian Empire as a result of the Treaty of Gulistan signed on 24 October 1813 between Russia and Qajar Iran following the Russo-Persian War of 1804–13. In 1823, Russian general Aleksey Petrovich Yermolov mentions Tegh in his description of the Karabakh province as an ethnically Armenian village with 111 tax-paying households. In the middle of the 19th century, the village was one of the largest in the province. The settlement at that time had 1,454 residents. The village itself had 240 courtyards, an Armenian church, and an oil mill. By 1893, the settlement had 472 households, and the population, entirely consisting of Armenians, numbered 3,159 inhabitants. Following the dissolution of the Russian empire, the region of Syunik was under dispute between the first republics of Armenia and Azerbaijan. On April 27, 1921, the region of Syunik was declared part of the Republic of Mountainous Armenia during the 2nd Pan-Zangezurian conference held in Tatev. However this republic was short-lived and by July of that year it was incorporated into the Soviet Union with the promise that it would become part of Soviet Armenia. While it was under Soviet rule, Tegh was part of the Goris district of the Armenian SSR. It was a center of industry and carpet making, being home to one of the Haygorg carpet factories of Armenia. Following the dissolution of the Soviet Union, Tegh is now part of the Syunik Marz of the Republic of Armenia.

== Geography ==
The village is located in the central-eastern part of the province, a short distance from the Vorotan River – a tributary of the Aras River, which, in turn, is a tributary of the Kurá – and the border with Azerbaijan. Tegh is the last village on the Goris-Stepanakert Highway before passing the border with Azerbaijan.

== Demographics ==
The Statistical Committee of Armenia reported its population was 2,520 in 2010, up from 2,333 at the 2001 census.

== Gallery ==
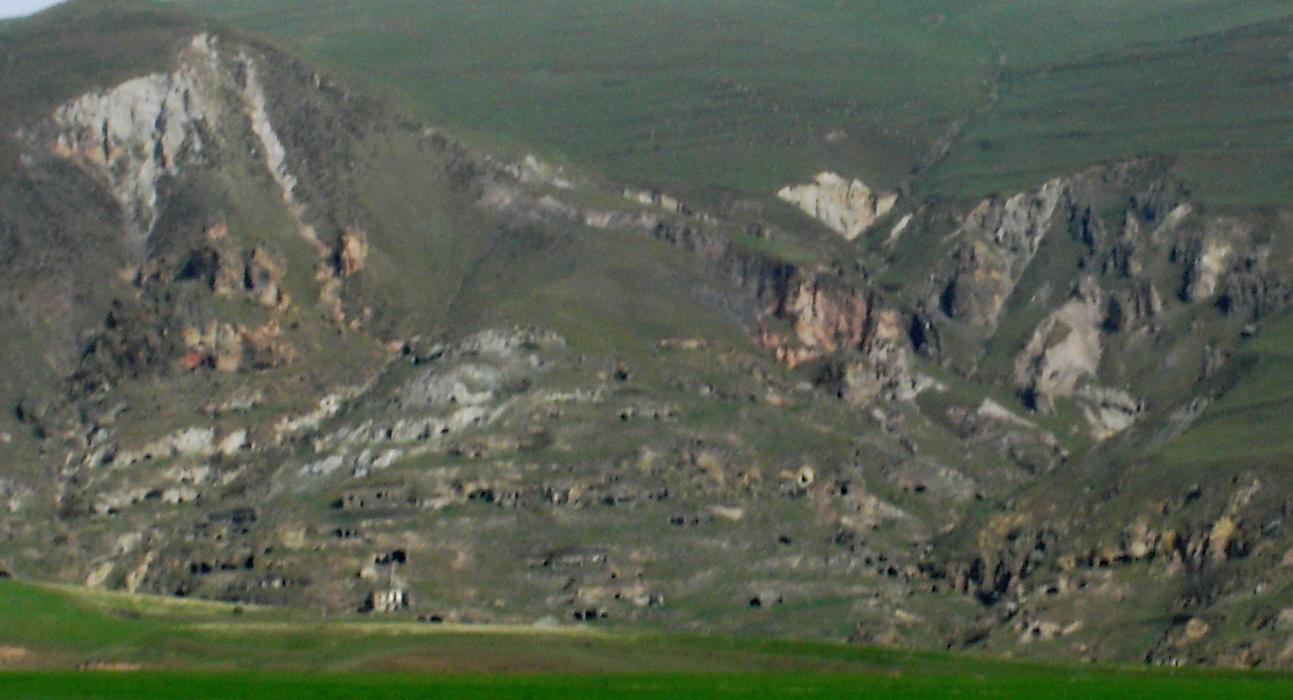
"Cave City" in Tegh

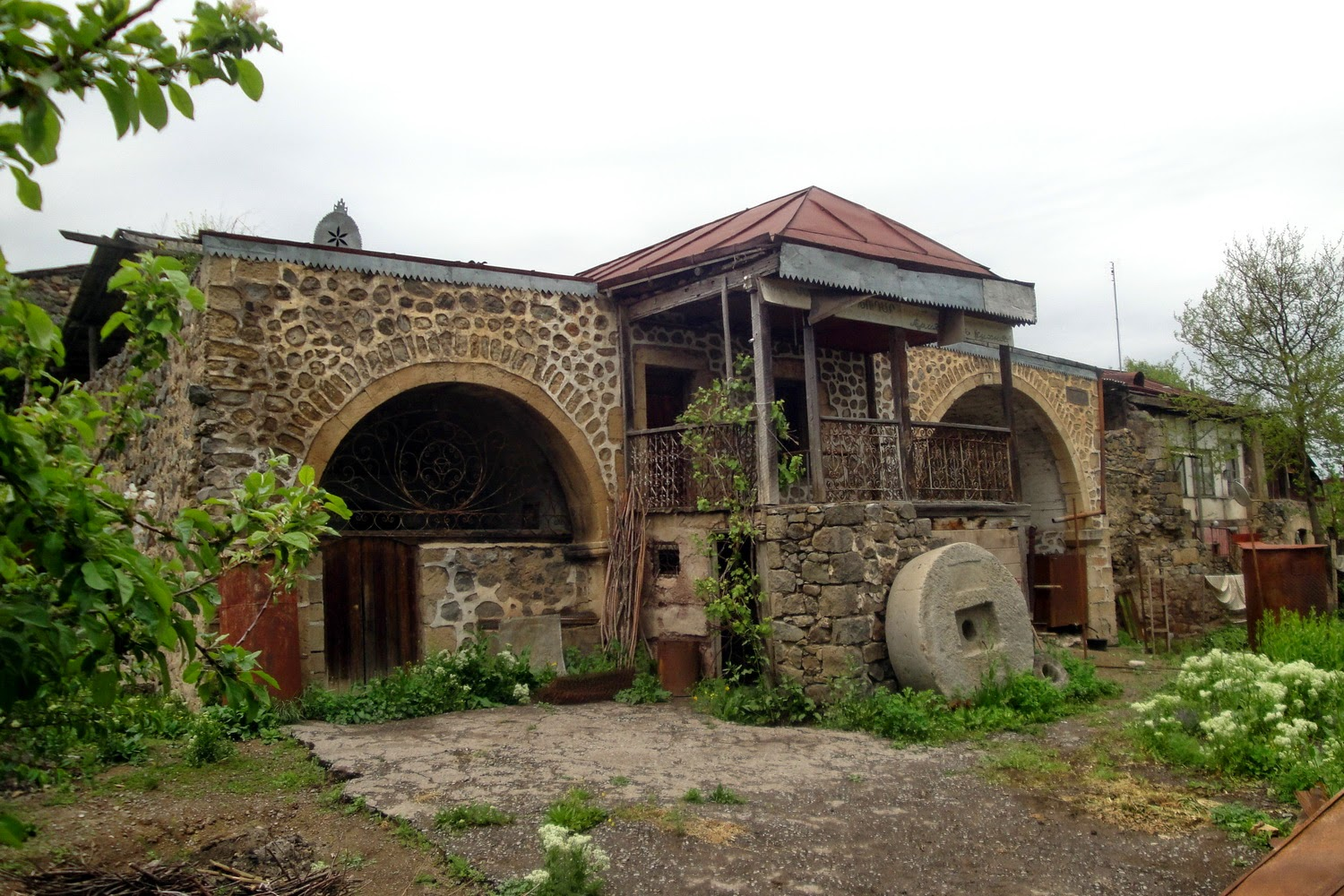
Residential complex "Amarath" of the Melik-Barkhudaryans (1783)

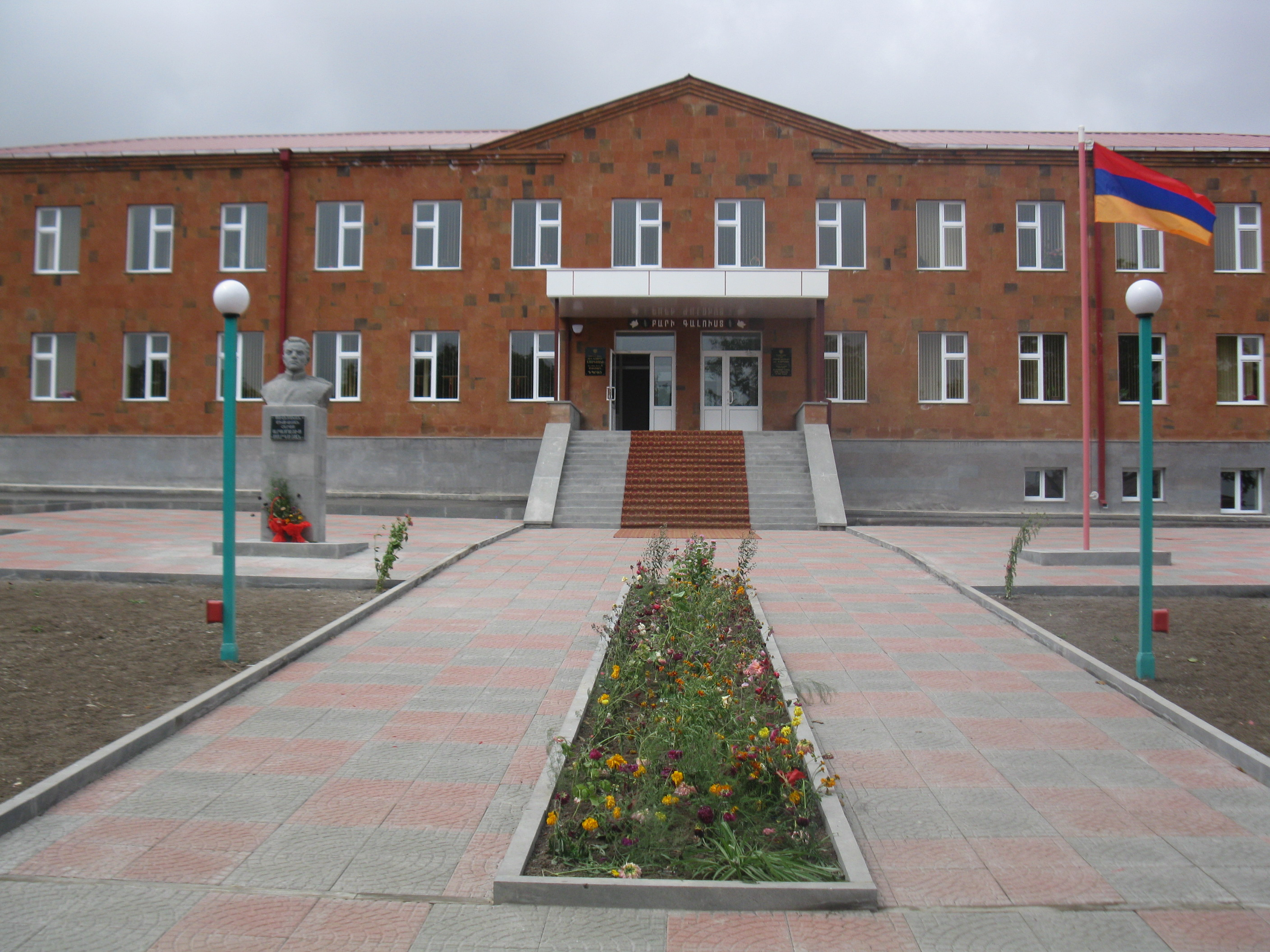
School in Tegh

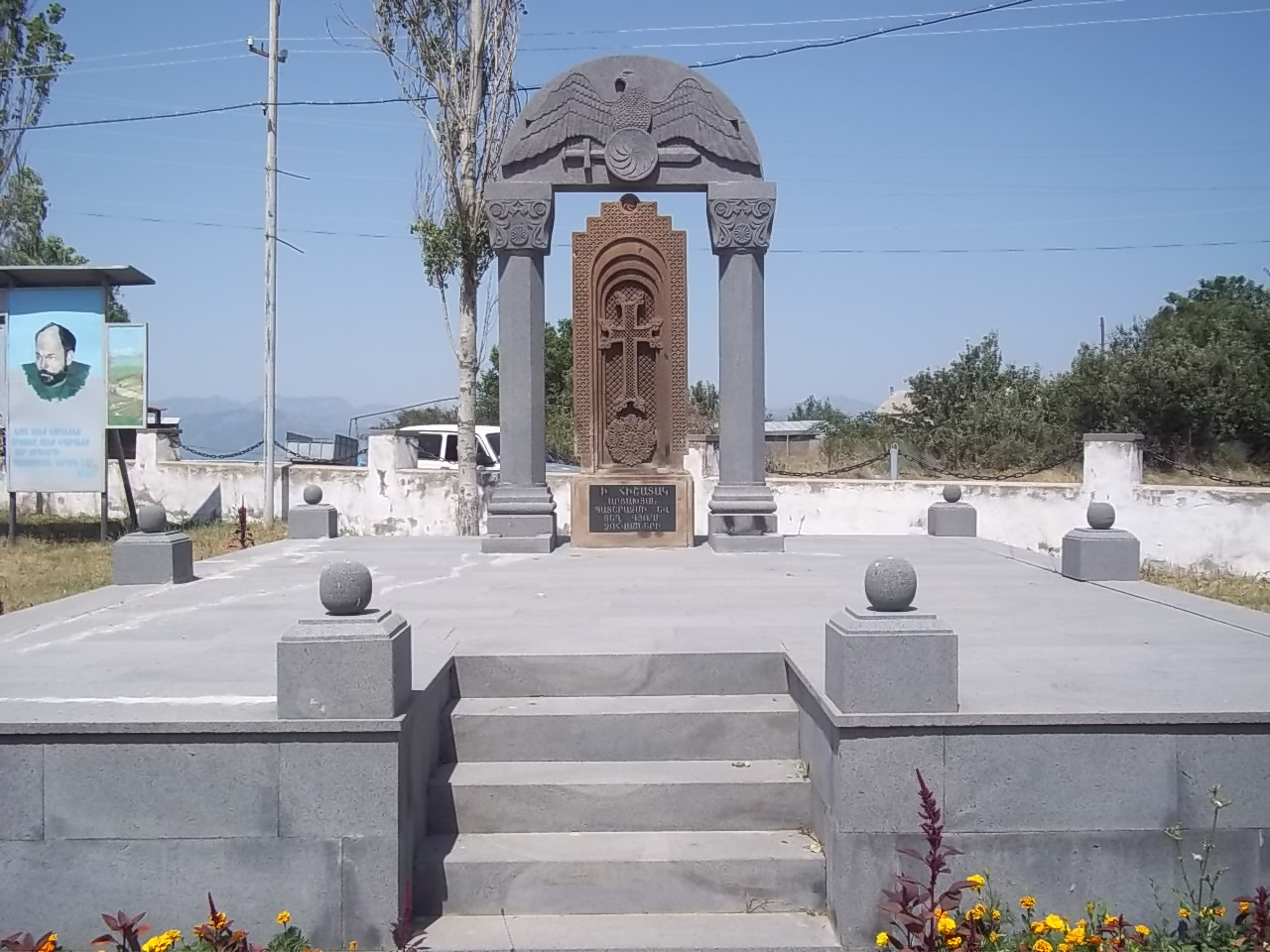
Khachkar monument in memory of the victims of the First Nagorno-Karabakh War

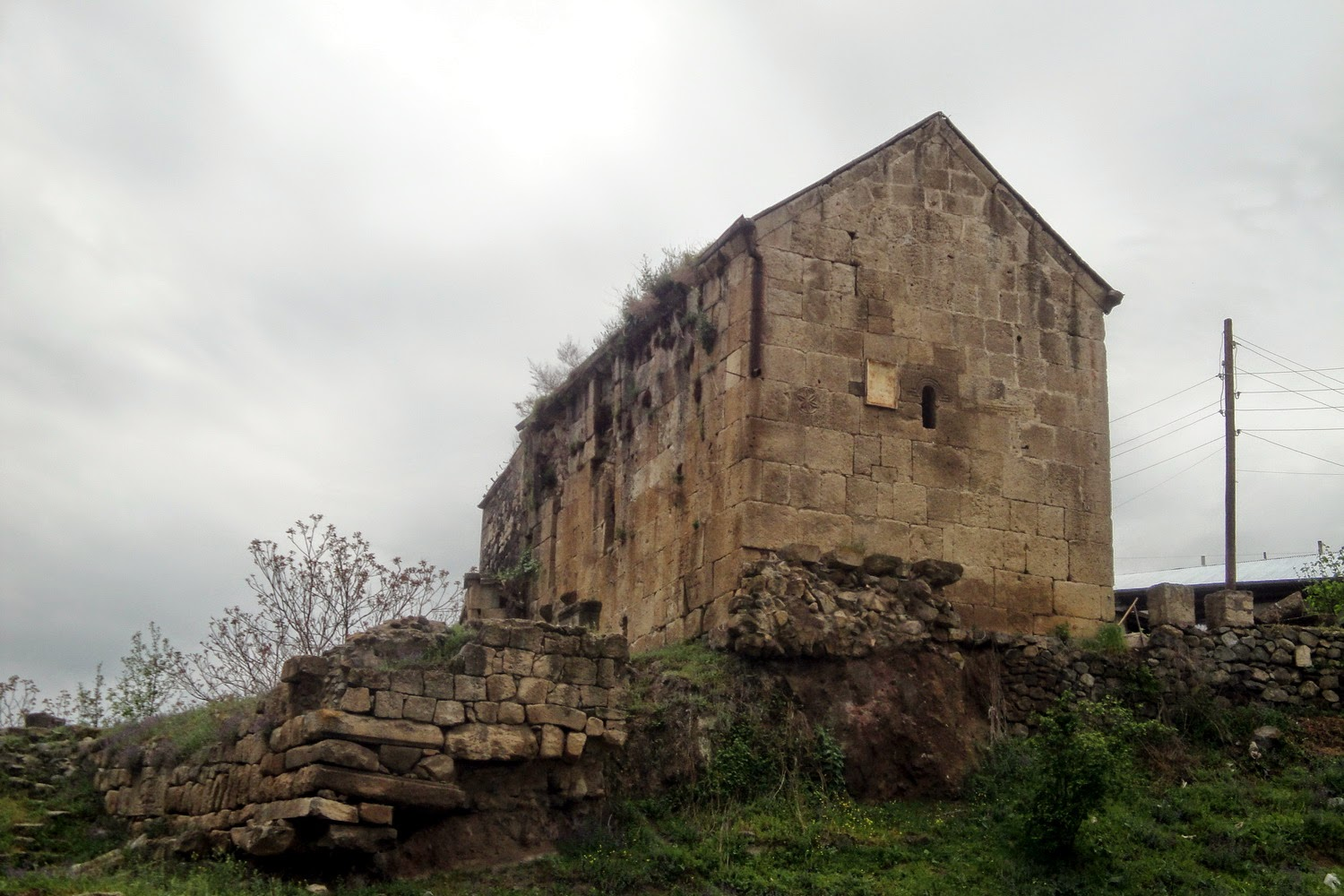
Saint George's Church in Tegh
