= Kornidzor =

Kornidzor Կոռնիձոր
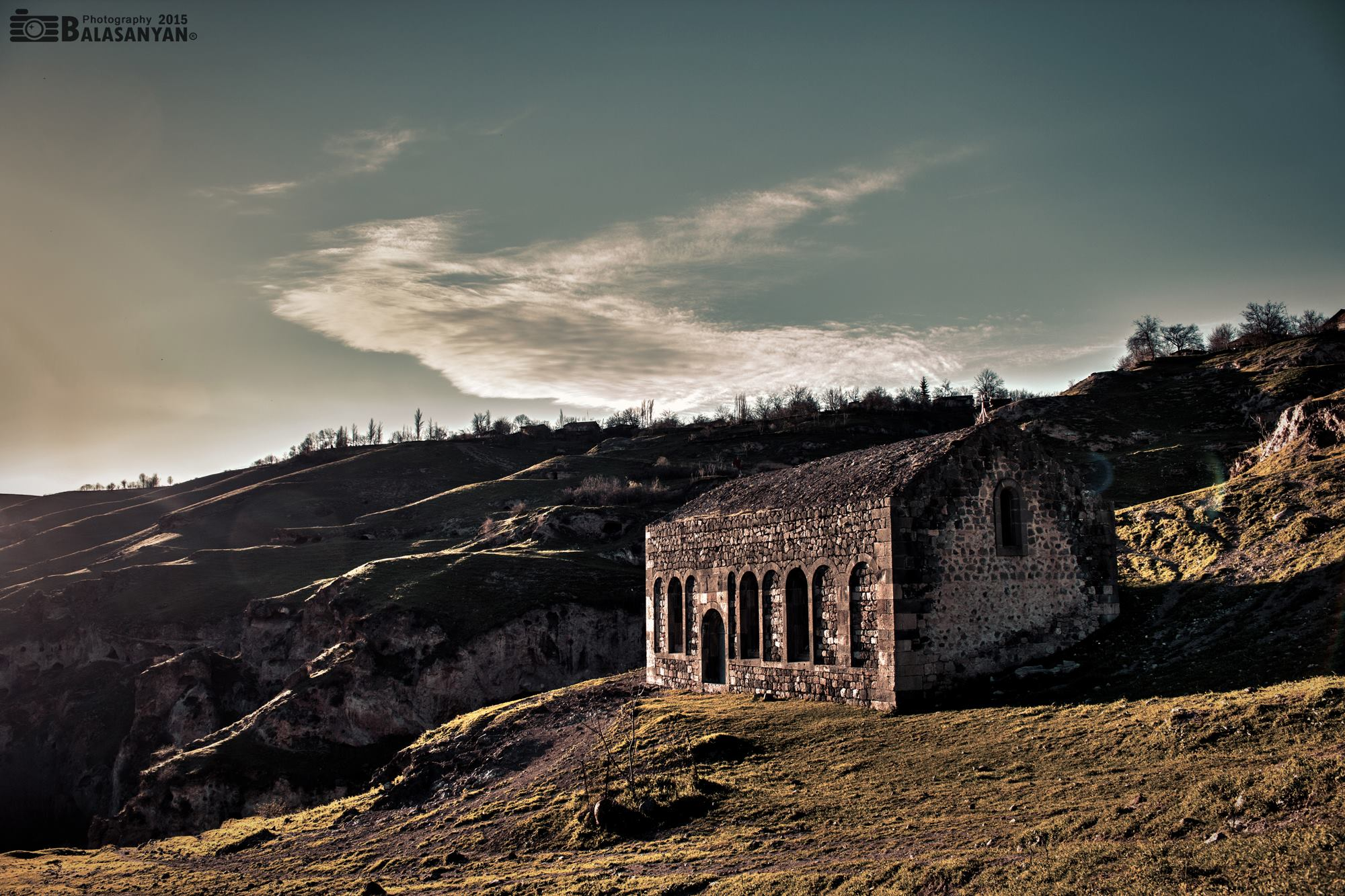
- Surb Hovhannes Church in Kornidzor

- Location within Armenia Location within Syunik Province
- Coordinates: 39°32′53″N 46°31′52″E
- Country: Armenia
- Province: Syunik
- Municipality: Tegh

Area
  - Total: 24.18 km^{2} (9.34 sq mi)

Population (2011)
  - Total: 1,100
  - Density: 45/km^{2} (120/sq mi)
- Time zone: UTC+4 (AMT)

Kornidzor (Armenian: Կոռնիձոր) is a village in the Tegh Municipality of the Syunik Province in Armenia.

== Geography ==
The village is located in the central-eastern part of the province, a short distance from the Vorotan River – a tributary of the Aras River, which, in turn, is a tributary of the Kurá – and the border with Azerbaijan.

== Demographics ==
The Statistical Committee of Armenia reported its population was 1,326 in 2010, up from 1,072 at the 2001 census.

== Gallery ==
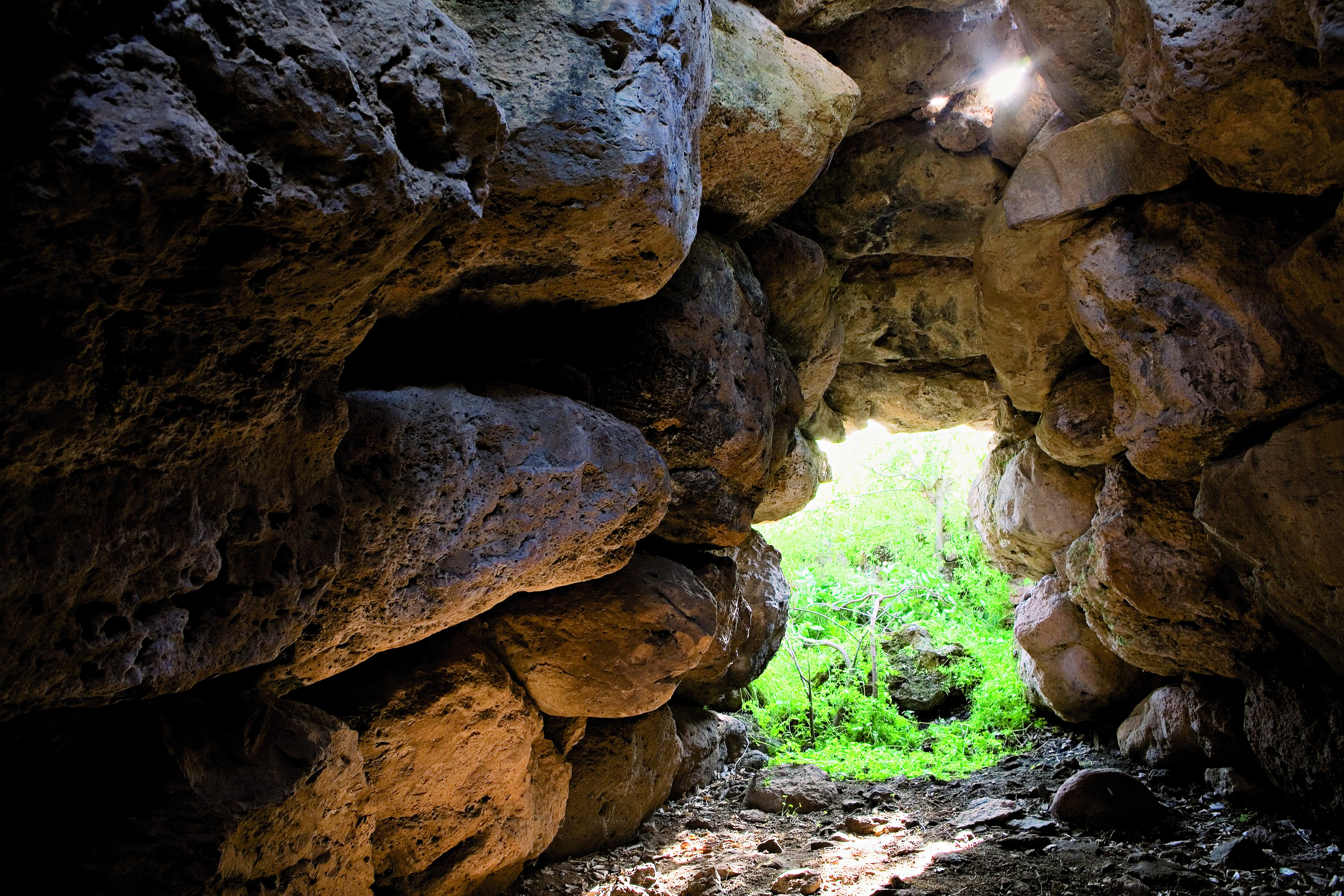
Stone dwelling

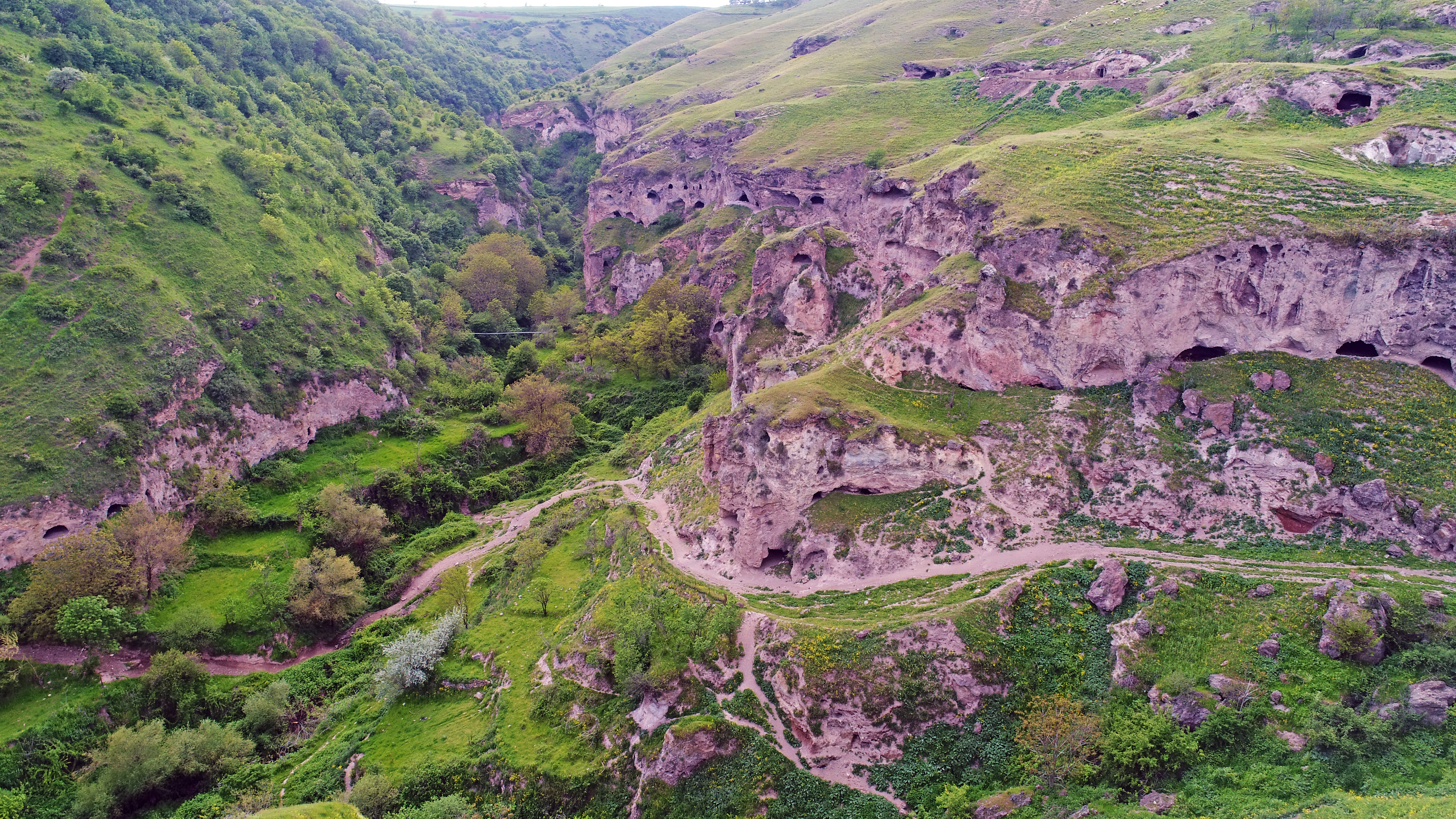
Scenery around the village

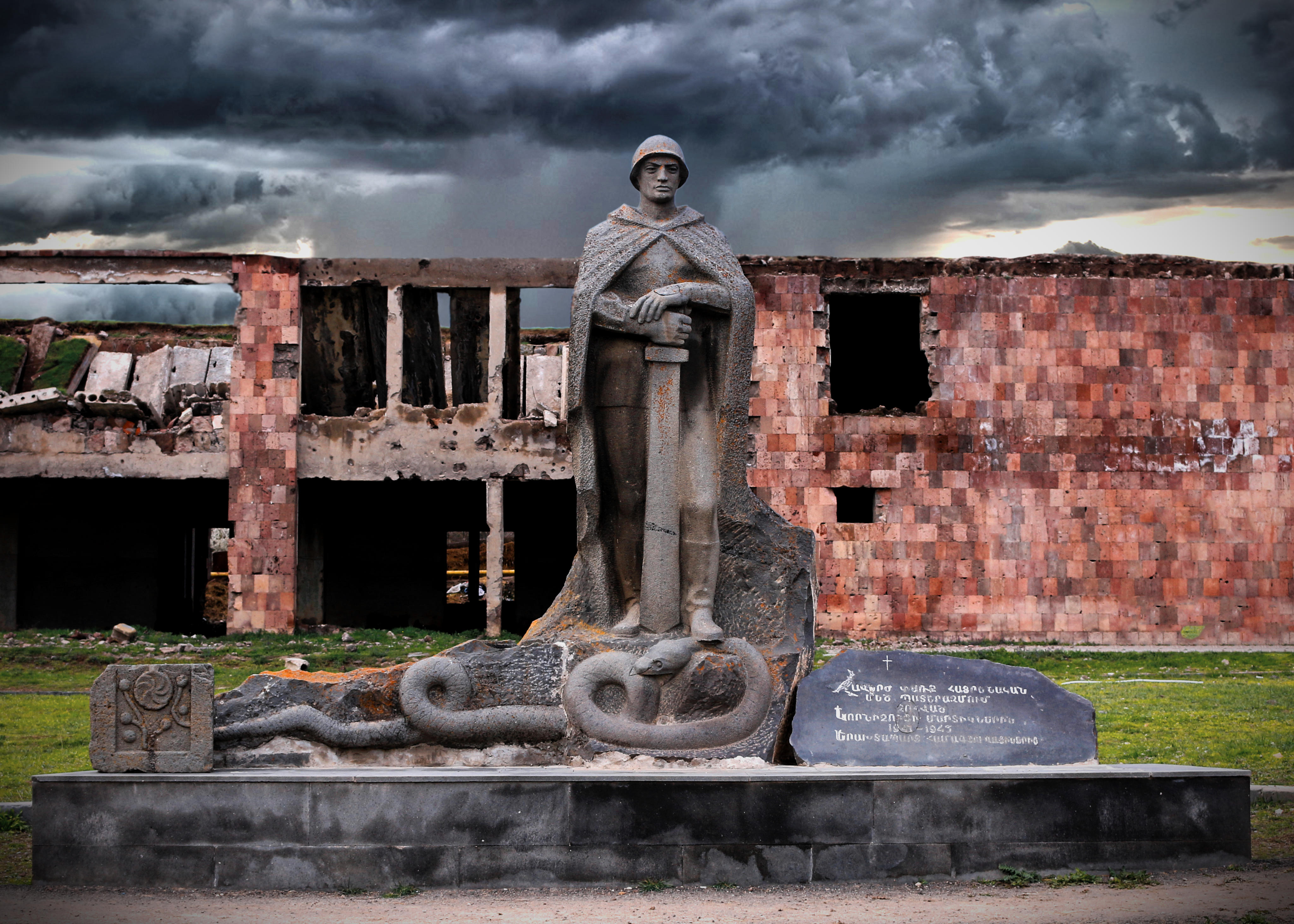
World War II memorial in Kornidzor

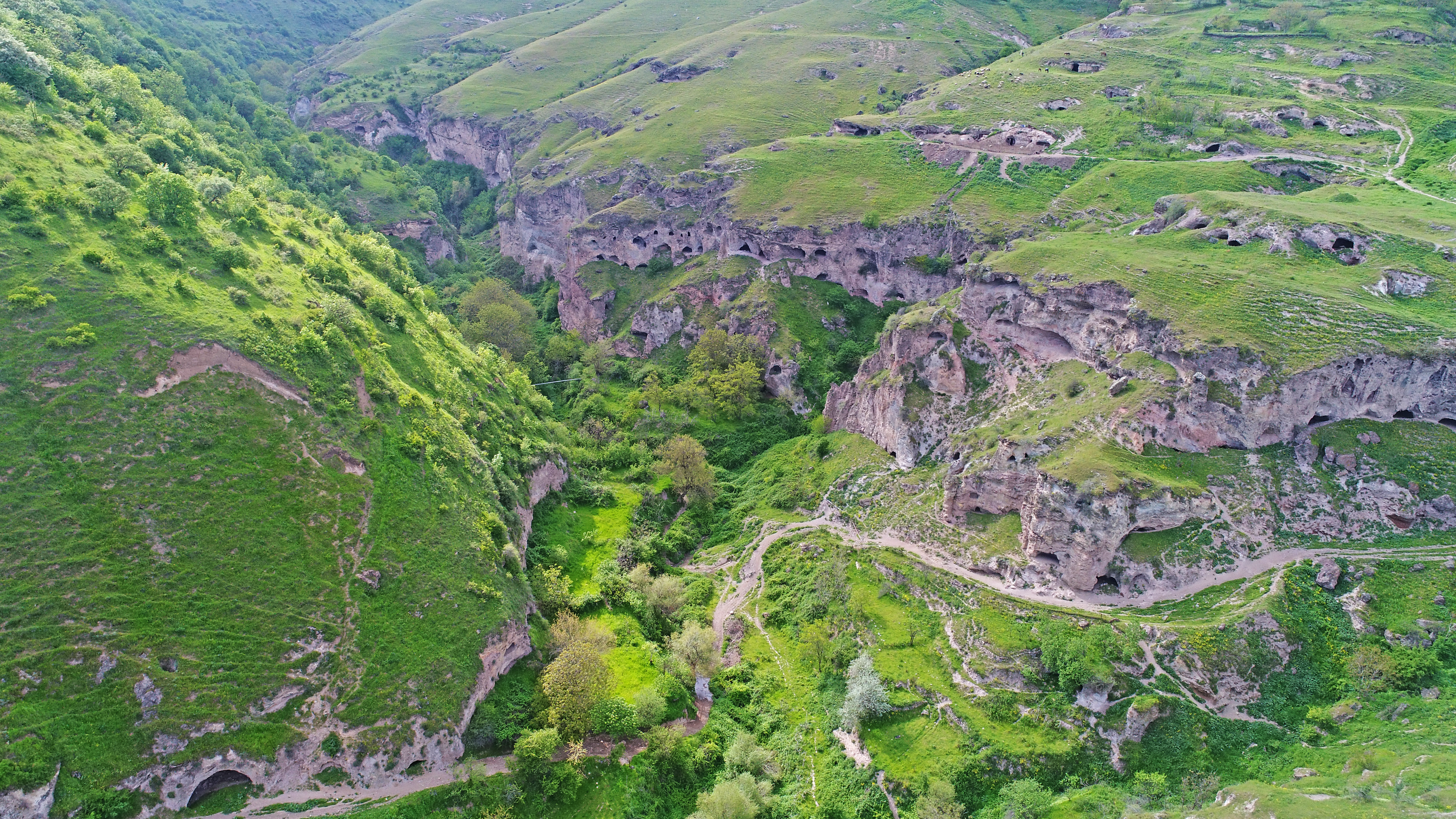
Scenery around the village
