= List of massacres of Armenians =

This is the list of massacres of ethnic Armenians.

== List ==
Name	Date	Location	Perpetrators	Armenian victims
Nakhchivan Massacre	1225-1230	Nakhchivan, Azerbaijan	Khwarazmian Empire	30,000-100,000
Armenian massacre by Amir Timur	1389-1390	Tataev, Armenia	(Timurid Empire) Timurids	20,000-100,000
Yerevan Massacre	1747	Armenia, Yerevan	Kingdom of Kartli-Kakheti, Panah Ali Khan	20,000-30,000
Hamidian massacres	1894–1896	Ottoman Empire	(Ottoman Empire) Ottoman government under Sultan Abdul Hamid II	88,243–300,000
Massacres of Diyarbekir (1895)	1895	Ottoman Empire	(Ottoman Empire) Ottoman government under Sultan Abdul Hamid II	25,000
Armenian–Tatar massacres	1905–1906	Baku, Baku Governorate, Elizavetpol Governorate, Erivan Governorate, and Tiflis Governorate of the Russian Empire	Azerbaijani mobs and irregulars	3,000 to 10,000 from both sides
Adana massacre	April 1909	Adana Vilayet and Aleppo Vilayet of the Ottoman Empire	Muslim mobs	19,479–25,000
Soltan Abad pogrom	May 1910	Soltan Abad (modern Arak), Markazi province of the Qajar Iran	Muslim mobs	Armenian priest and 12 Armenians
Armenian genocide	1915–1923	Ottoman Empire	(Ottoman Empire) Committee of Union and Progress government	800,000–1,500,000
September Days	September 1918	Baku, Azerbaijan Democratic Republic (under Ottoman control at the time)	(Ottoman Empire) Army of Islam; Azerbaijani mobs	10,000–30,000
Muslim uprisings in Kars and Sharur–Nakhichevan	July 1919 – July 1920	(Armenia) Ararat, Kars, Nakhichevan, Sharur, Surmalu	(Azerbaijan) Azerbaijani-Turkish soldiers and locals	10,000
Agulis Massacre (Note: As part of the Muslim uprisings in Kars and Sharur–Nakhichevan.)	24–25 December 1919	Agulis, First Republic of Armenia	(Azerbaijan) Azerbaijani-Turkish authorities and Azerbaijani mobs and refugees	1,400
Khaibalikend massacre	June 1919	(Armenia) Ghaibalishen, Krkjan Jamilli, and Pahlul villages of Karabakh Council	(Azerbaijan) Azerbaijani Army	700
Shusha massacre	March 1920	Shusha, Azerbaijan Democratic Republic	(Azerbaijan) Azerbaijani Army	500–20,000
Turkish–Armenian War	September–December 1920	First Republic of Armenia	(Turkey) Turkish Nationalist forces	60,000–198,000
Sumgait pogrom	February 1988	(Soviet Union) Sumgayit, Soviet Azerbaijan	(Azerbaijan Soviet Socialist Republic) Azerbaijani mobs	26 (official) to 200(nonofficial sources)
Kirovabad pogrom	November 1988	(Soviet Union) Kirovabad, Soviet Azerbaijan	(Azerbaijan Soviet Socialist Republic) Azerbaijani mobs	10–12 (official) to 130(nonofficial sources)
Baku pogrom	January 1990	(Soviet Union) Baku, Soviet Azerbaijan	(Azerbaijan Soviet Socialist Republic) Azerbaijani mobs	90
Dushanbe riots	12–14 February 1990	(Soviet Union) Dushanbe, Soviet Tajikistan	Tajik nationalist & Islamist activists	26
Artashevan massacre	May 1991	Artashevan, Nagorno-Karabakh	(Azerbaijan) Azerbaijani Armed Forces	300
Maraga massacre	10 April 1992	Maraga, Nagorno-Karabakh	(Azerbaijan) Azerbaijani Armed Forces	50–100

== See also ==
- List of massacres in Turkey
- Anti-Armenian sentiment
- Alevi massacres
- List of massacres in Azerbaijan
- Massacres in the course of the Nagorno-Karabakh War
- Destroyed Armenian churches in Turkey
