= List of massacres in Azerbaijan =

The following lists are of massacres that have occurred within the current boundaries of Azerbaijan (numbers may be approximate).

== Before 1988 ==
Name	Year	Date	Location	Deaths	Targeted group	Notes
Sack of Shamakhi	1721	18 August	Shamakhi	4,000–5,000	Shia inhabitants of Shamakhi	Shia inhabitants of the city (includes the city's officials) were killed by rebellious Sunni Lezgin tribesmen.
Battle of Ganja (1804)	1804	February	Ganja	1,500–3,000	Inhabitants of Ganja	Civilians were massacred during the capture of the city by the Russians; some of the captured soldiers were executed
Armenian–Tatar massacres of 1905–1906	1905–1906	February	Baku; Ganja;Nakhchivan; Shusha; Tiflis	3,000–10,000	Armenians, Azerbaijanis	
Shamkhor Massacre	1918	January	Şəmkir	1,000	armed Russian soldiers	Russian soldiers killed by Azerbaijani nationalists
March Days	1918	March 30 – April 2	Azerbaijan	12,000–25,000	Azerbaijanis	According to the statements of Azerbaijan representatives, "the Bolsheviks".
September Days	1918	September	Baku	10,000–15,000	Armenians	Armenians killed by the Army of Islam
Khaibalikend Massacre	1919	June 5–7	Nagorno-Karabakh	600–700	Armenians	Armenians killed by armed ethnic Azerbaijani and Kurdish irregulars and Azerbaijani soldiers; Villages of Khaibalikend, Jamillu, Karkujahan and Pahliul were destroyed
Muslim uprisings in Kars and Sharur–Nakhichevan	1919–1920	July–December	Nakhchivan	10,000	Armenians	
Agulis Massacre	1919	December 24–25	Yuxarı Əylis	1,400	Armenians	Early-20th-century anti-Armenian massacre of the Armenian population of Agulis by the Turkish army accompanied by the Azerbaijani refugees from Zangezur which resulted in the destruction of the town of Agulis.
Shusha pogrom	1920	March 22–26	Shusha	500–20,000	Armenians	Armenians killed by Azerbaijanis
1920 Ganja Revolt	1920	June	Ganja	15,000	Azerbaijanis	Bolsheviks slaughtered civilians including women and children after the capture of rebel Ganja. Many women were raped and Koran were burnt.

== Nagorno-Karabakh conflict ==
The following is a list of massacres and pogroms, which took place in the course of the First Nagorno-Karabakh War and the Second Nagorno-Karabakh War between Armenians and Azerbaijanis.

Name	Year	Date	Location	Deaths	Targeted group	Notes
Sumgait pogrom	1988	February 27 – March 1	Sumgait	32 (26 Armenians and 6 Azerbaijanis)	Armenians	Armenians killed by Azerbaijanis; 20 ambulances were destroyed, and reports detail widespread rape, mutilation, robberies and disemboweling of fetuses
Kirovabad pogrom	1988	November	Kirovabad	130 Armenians	Armenians	Azeri-led pogrom directed against Armenian inhabitants of Kirovabad (now Ganja)
Baku Pogrom	1990	January 13	Baku	90	Armenians	Armenians killed by Azerbaijanis; many incidents of rape, robbery and torture; 700 injured.
Black January	1990	January 19–20	Baku, Azerbaijan	133–137	Peaceful protesters of the Azerbaijani national independence movement	Killed by Soviet troops; ambulance workers rushing to help the wounded and random passers-by, including women and children, among the dead
Operation Ring	1991	April 30 – May 15	Shahumyan Province	unknown	Armenians	number of casualties unknown, approximately 17,000 people displaced, gross human rights violations
Capture of Gushchular and Malibeyli	1992	February 10–12	Malibeyli, Ashaghi Gushchular, Yukhari Gushchular villages of Shusha District	8 (per Helsinki Watch); 15–50 (per Azerbaijan)	Azerbaijanis	Azerbaijanis killed by Armenian irregular armed units
Khojaly Massacre	1992	February 25–26	Khojaly, Azerbaijan	More than 200 (per Human Rights Watch) 613 (per Azerbaijan)	Azerbaijanis	Azerbaijanis killed by Armenian troops.
Maraga Massacre	1992	April 10	Maraga	40–100	Armenians	Armenians killed (many decapitated); corpses buried in a mass grave outside the village.
Bombardment of Tartar	2020	September 28 —November 10	Tartar District	17	Azerbaijanis	Azerbaijanis killed by alleged indiscriminate attacks of Armenian Armed Forces.
2020 Ganja missile attacks	2020	October 4–17	Ganja	32	Azerbaijanis	Azerbaijanis killed by alleged indiscriminate attacks of Armenian Armed Forces.
2020 Barda missile attacks	2020	October 27—November 7	Barda, Əyricə, and Qarayusifli	27	Azerbaijanis	Use of cluster munitions against civilians by Armenian Armed Forces and Artsakh Defence Army.

== Other Massacres after 1988 ==
Name	Year	Date	Location	Deaths	Targeted Group	Notes
Azerbaijan State Oil Academy shooting	2009	April 30	Baku	12	Students and staff members	Victims included two nationals of Sudan and a Syrian national.

== Sources ==
- Atkin, Muriel (1980). Russia and Iran, 1780–1828. University of Minnesota Press. ISBN 978-0-8166-5697-4.
- Matthee, Rudi (2012). Persia in Crisis: Safavid Decline and the Fall of Isfahan. I.B.Tauris. ISBN 978-1-84511-745-0.
