= Yeghishe Ishkhanian =

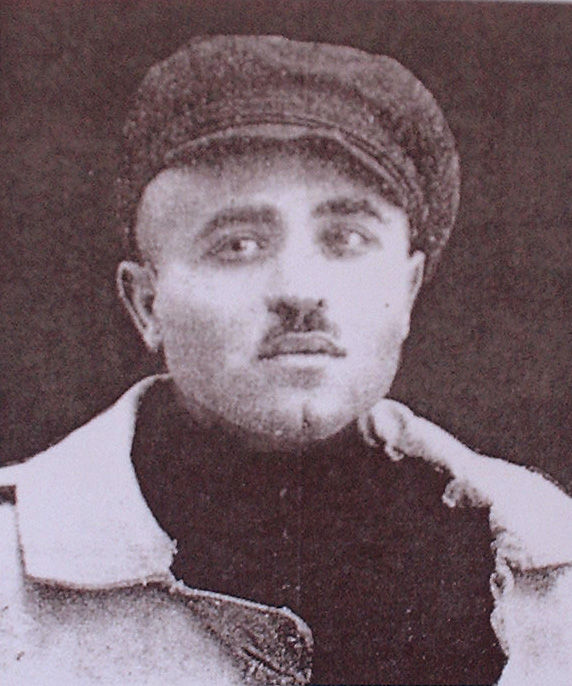

First prime minister of Nagorno-Karabakh
- In office July 27, 1918 – February 20, 1919
- Preceded by: Office Created
- Succeeded by: Aslan Shahnazarian

Personal details
- Born: January 1, 1886 Shusha
- Died: April 28, 1975 (aged 89) New York City

Yeghishe Ishkhanian (Armenian: Եղիշե Իշխանյանը; January 1, 1886, Shusha – April 28, 1975) was a prominent Armenian politician and statesman, who held high offices in the Nagorno-Karabakh in the beginning of the 20th century. From July 27, 1918, to February 20, 1919, Ishkhanian headed the People's Government of Karabakh (subsequently renamed the Karabakh Council). Subsequently, he was elected to be vice-president of the National Council.

== Early life ==
Yeghishe Ishkhanian was born in the capital city Shusha (local name: Shushi). He was the son of Hovhanes-Bek Ishkhanian, a civil servant in the Customs and Excise, a well-known man in Nagrono-Karabakh and a close friend of Armenian bishop Vahan Ter-Georgian.

Ishkhanian received his primary and secondary education in Shusha and graduated from Yerevan's Diocesan School. After that, he left for Petrograd, where he studied at the Agronomic High School until the February Revolution of 1917.

== Back to home ==
In May 1917, Ishkhanian returned to Shusha and actively participated in the organization of the social order and the establishment of a self-government in Nagorno-Karabakh. On 24 December 1917 he was elected to be vice-president of the Interparty Bureau (the Provisional Government). Simultaneously he was appointed as member of the Armenian-Tatar Committee (which had the chief task to maintain peaceful coexist between the Armenian majority and the Azeri minority in Nagorno-Karabakh, particularly in Shusha).

On July 27, 1918, when the 1st Karabakh Congress elected the People's Government of Karabakh (an independent government in Nagorno Karabakh during 1918–1920), Ishkhanian was elected prime minister.

== Administration ==
The administration of Ishkhanian (1918–1919) was full of political vicissitudes. First the Transcaucasus was occupied by the Ottoman Turks, next the Britain military mission took command there. As the head of the People's Government of Karabakh, Yeghishe Ishkhanian had to enter negotiations with the new commanders of the region, as well with the government of the Democratic Republic of Azerbaijan. Moreover, The People's Government of Karabakh faced an influx of about 3.000 Armenian refugees from the Armenian genocide and about 5.000 from the village Berdadzor (in the Lachin corridor), which was attacked by Azeri forces in August 1918.

However, they saw as the greatest threat for Nagorno-Karabakh was the government of Azerbaijan's attempts to annex Nagorno-Karabakh. Being a co-editor of the government's official newspaper "Artsakh", Ishkhanian wrote an article on March 7, 1919, entitled "Get your bloody hands off".

In his speech in the 4th Karabakh Congress Ishkhanian expressed his concern thus:

The Provisional National Council has performed its explicit duty by not recognizing and not resigning itself to the rule of Azerbaijan and at the same time applied to Yerevan, that the Government [of Armenia] should do the necessary. One thing must be clear to every one of us: if the Government of Armenia don't takes strong measures to remove Sultanov and the Azerbaijani military unit from Karabakh, and if the latter becomes an apple of discord between the two neighboring countries, one must not be a prophet to predict, that Azerbaijan and Armenia will clash with one another, and the result being that Karabakh will become the grave of both.

== Exile ==
But the new rulers of Transcaucasia were unable to deal with the recalcitrant republic.

On October 1, 1918, the Ottoman Turks arrested many of the members of the Government, including Yeghishe Ishkhanian. During the interrogation, not obtaining what they wanted to get from him, they beat him up.

The Britain Mission, which followed the Ottoman Turks, brought in fact no better condition for Nagorno-Karabakh, moreover it helped Khosrov bey Sultanov to get authority over Nagorno-Karabakh. In April 1919 general Shuttleworth tried for the last time to persuade the 5th Karabakh Congress to "temporary recognize the Azerbaijani jurisdiction", but in vain. On June 5, 1919, Ishkhanian, along with two other government leaders, was banished from Shusha.

== In Armenia ==
Following his expulsion, Ishkhanian lived in the Democratic Republic of Armenia. He met with the country's government leaders, in particular Hamo Ohanjanyan, and hold discussion about the Karabakh-issue.

In July he went to Vayots Dzor, and was appointed as secretary of the regional executive branch. He remained there until 1920 and worked with Drastamat Kanayan, Garegin Nzhdeh and others. In April 1920, after the Bolsheviks had suppressed the February Uprising, many Armenian politicians and officers moved to Syunik. In 1921, after the fall of Mountain-Armenia, they crossed the river Arax and escaped to Iran. Among them was Yeghishe Ishkhanian.

== Journal ==
Ishkhanian spent the rest of his life in New York City. In 1966 he recounted the events of 1917–1920 in a journal. He remembered with inspiration the government they had formed, where statesmen of different political ideas worked together, but with pain and regret - the next tragic developments in Nagorno-Karabakh, the destruction and the Shusha pogrom, (at the time he had been in Karakilisa), where among many others, his parents were killed.

Political offices
Preceded by Office created	Prime Minister of Nagorno-Karabakh; 1918 – 1919	Succeeded by Aslan Shahnazarian
