= Karabakh Council =

Government of the Republic of Artsakh

Karabakh Council Ղարաբաղի Ազգային խորհրդ
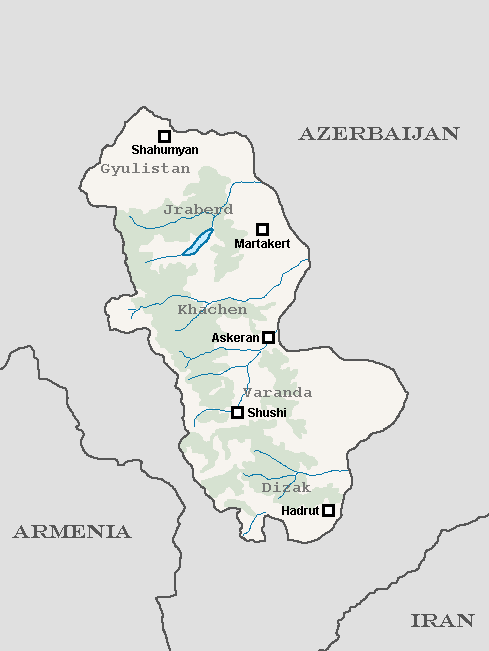
- Map of the Karabakh Council 1918–1920
- Capital: Shushi (1918–1919); Shosh (1919–1920)
- Common languages: Armenian
- Religion: Armenian Apostolic
- Government: Council
  - Chairman: Yeghishe Ishkhanian
  - Secretary: Melikset Yesayan
  - Foreign Affairs Department: Ashot Melik-Hovsepian
- Legislature: Assembly of Armenians of Karabakh
- Historical era: Interwar period
  - Established: 22 July 1918
  - Sovietization: 29 April 1920

Area
  - Total: 5,400 km^{2} (2,100 sq mi)

Population
  - 1916: 142,572
Preceded by	Succeeded by
Transcaucasian Democratic Federative Republic	Nagorno Karabakh Autonomous Oblast
- Today part of: Azerbaijan

The Karabakh Council (Armenian: Ղարաբաղի Ազգային խորհրդ, romanized: Gharabaghi Azgayin khorhrd, lit. 'Karabakh National council') was the unrecognised government over Mountainous Karabakh (Nagorno-Karabakh) in eastern Armenia between 1918 and 1920. The council's body was elected by the assembly of Mountainous Karabakh—the representative body of the people of Nagorno-Karabakh—on 27 July 1918. Initially it was called the People's Government of Karabakh, but in September 1918 it was renamed the Karabakh Council. It was the modern successor of the historical Artsakh province. Its capital was the city of Shushi (Shusha). The Karabakh Council was formally dissolved after the sovietization of Azerbaijan and Armenia.

== Formation ==
The Karabakh Council was an independent national government which exercised its powers during the periods following congresses. Emanuele Aliprandi, an Italian writer who edits the bi-weekly newsletter of the Italian Armenian community's online website has published such claims in Le ragioni del Karabakh (2010), which is "the first text in Italian on the little Republic of Artsakh." Aliprandi claims that Council considered itself authorized to act both as a legislative and an executive body, and that the decisions on major political and economic issues of the region during 1918–1920 were taken by the Karabakh Congress. Geographically, the scope of the powers of the Council covered the mountainous regions of Karabakh, including the Armenian villages of Gandzak District.

The first provisional government included:

- Justice Department: Commissar Arso Hovhannisian, Levon Vardapetian
- Military Department: Harutiun Tumanian
- Department of Education: Rouben Shahnazarian
- Refugees Department: Moushegh Zakharian
- Control Department: Anoush Ter-Mikaelian
- Department of Foreign Affairs: Ashot Melik-Hovsepian.

The Council was chaired by Yeghishe Ishkhanian, and Melikset Yesayan was elected its secretary.

When the Yerevan-based Armenian Congress of Eastern Armenians was established on October 1917, it incorporated the Armenian National Councils all around the Russian Empire including activities of Armenian National Councils in Karabakh, Tiflis and Baku.

== History ==
From 1918 until the Soviet takeover of the region in 1920, the First Republic of Armenia and the Azerbaijan Democratic Republic both sought control over Nagorno-Karabakh.

Some authors claim that Nagorno-Karabakh was not a part of Azerbaijan in 1918–1920 and that it was an independent entity affiliated the Republic of Armenia, however, Azerbaijani historians reject this idea and affirm the region was consistently a part of Azerbaijan.

Following Armenia's signing of the Treaty of Batum and capitulation to the Ottoman Empire, Mountainous Karabakh was declared an independent political state by the convocation of the First Assembly of Armenians of Karabakh on 22 July 1918. By September 1918, Azerbaijani–Ottoman forces captured the city of Shushi, however, were unable to penetrate the countryside due to the efforts of local Armenians.

Following the Armistice of Mudros on 30 October 1918, Ottoman forces were obligated to withdraw from the South Caucasus, including Shushi, after which their garrison was supplemented by the British. On 15 January 1919, the British governor of Baku, General Thomson appointed Khosrov bey Sultanov the "Governor-General of Karabakh and Zangezur" within Azerbaijan, despite neither region being completely under Azerbaijani control. On 5 June 1919, due to the refusal of the Karabakh assembly to submit to Azerbaijani authority as prescribed by British command, 2,000 mounted Kurdish irregulars led by the Sultan bey Sultanov—the brother of Khosrov—looted several Armenian villages in the outskirts of Shushi including Khaibalikend, Krkejan, Pahliul, and Jamillu, as well as several remote hamlets resulting in the deaths of some 600 Armenians.

As a result of the bloodshed, the Karabakh Council was compelled to sign a provisional accord with the Azerbaijani government on 22 August 1919, submitted to their rule pending their final status decided in the Paris Peace Conference. The signing ceremony was attended by members of the Karabakh Council, Bishop Vahan, Khosrov bey Sultanov, and other notable Armenian and Muslim officials. The agreement provided for Armenian cultural autonomy, the formation of a six-member council of three Armenians and three Muslims, the continued existence for the 4 uezds which make up the Karabakh region, the limitation of Azerbaijani garrisons to the cities of Shushi and Stepanakert.

Following the signing of the agreement, the British forces stationed in the region immediately withdrew, setting the stage for Azerbaijan to enforce its will on Karabakh beyond the limits defined in the provisional agreement. Despite the agreement stipulating the requirement of consent of two-thirds of the six-member council for Azerbaijan to make military movements, in November 1919 Azerbaijani forces were being transferred throughout Karabakh in preparation of an incursion into the Armenian region of Zangezur/Syunik.

As the Paris Peace Conference was inconclusive on the issue of the South Caucasus territorial disputes, on 19 February 1920 Khosrov bey Sultanov issued an ultimatum to the Karabakh Council to consent to the region's permanent incorporation into Azerbaijan. During meetings of the Eighth Assembly of Armenians of Karabakh from 28 February to 4 March, the delegates expressed discontent with the Azerbaijani administration and warned that they would resort to countermeasures if their existence was threatened. Despite the approaching Red Army of the Russian SFSR, Azerbaijan moved the bulk of its forces including 5,000 soldiers, 6 field guns and 8 mountain guns to Karabakh.

In the uprising that followed, due to the unsuccessful attempt by local Armenian forces to disarm the Azerbaijani garrisons in Shushi and Khankend, Shushi befell a pogrom which saw the Armenian half of the town looted and destroyed, with its Armenian inhabitants evicted and 500–20,000 being massacred. To support its forces in Shushi, the Azerbaijani army penetrated the Askeran pass, capturing the town of Askeran, and secured the road into Mountainous Karabakh. Azerbaijani forces were also successful in recapturing Armenian villages in the northern sector of the region known as Gyulistan or Shahumyan. Shortly after the Sovietization of Azerbaijan, the 11th Army of Soviet Russia entered Mountainous Karabakh, permanently ending the existence of the Karabakh Council.

According to historian Richard G. Hovannisian, if the Republic of Armenia had incorporated Mountainous Karabakh they could recruit some 10,000 local Armenians for their army which desperately lacked manpower in its objective of expanding westward into Armenia's awarded territories.
