= Capture of Gushchular and Malibeyli =

1992 incident during the First Nagorno-Karabakh War

Coordinates: 39°49′46″N 46°47′36″E

Capture of Malibeyli and Gushchular
- Part of the First Nagorno-Karabakh War
- Date: February 10–12, 1992
- Location: Malibeyli, Ashaghi Gushchular, Yukhari Gushchular villages of Shusha District, Azerbaijan
- Participants: Armenian irregular armed units
- Outcome: 8 civilians killed

The Capture of Gushchular and Malibeyli was an incident in which eight ethnic Azerbaijani civilians were killed by Armenian irregular armed units in simultaneous attacks on the villages of Malibeyli, Ashaghi Gushchular, and Yukhari Gushchular in the Shusha District of Azerbaijan, on February 10–12, 1992 during the First Nagorno-Karabakh War.

== Overview ==
According to the Memorial, the villages of Malibeyli and Gushchular were attacked by Armenian irregular armed units where the houses were burned and several civilians were killed. Both sides accused the other of using the villages as strategic gathering points, covering the artillery positions. According to several eyewitnesses, the Azerbaijani self-defense forces were mixed in with civilians as they fled.

Azerbaijani populated villages of Malibeyli and Gushchular (administratively separated as Ashaghi Gushchular and Yukhari Gushchular) of Shusha District of Azerbaijan are located in the highlands of Karabakh region, close to the regional center of Shusha. The villages had a population of nearly 4,000 people and shared the same village administration. Like Khojaly in 1988, Gushchular and Malibeyli received Azerbaijani refugees from Armenia. The figure ranged from 580 to 1500. When the Nagorno–Karabakh conflict started, the villages became one of the main targets of Armenian armed units. Since October 1991, Malibeyli was in complete blockade.

A report in the newspaper Express Chronicle asserted that on February 5, a helicopter distributed warning leaflets telling villagers they had two days to leave the village before it "would cease to exist", however, no interviews confirmed this report. Since October 1991, the residents were confined to their villages and the only way in or out was by helicopter. The last helicopter to fly into Shusha district was shot down by Armenians on January 28. At midnight on February 10, Armenian armed units, reportedly aided by Russian troops, stormed Malibeyli village. The women and children from Malibeyli fled to Gushchular village. Inhabitants of both villages took positions and fought the enemy until 9 a.m. All roads to the nearby towns of Shusha and Khojaly were cut off. The closest village was Abdal Gulably of Agdam District and required passage through Armenian-held villages. Most of the armed ethnic Armenians were volunteers from Syria, Lebanon, the United States, and France.

Malibeyli and Gushchular were attacked by Armenian armored personnel carriers and heavy artillery after large-scale Azerbaijani ground assault against Stepanakert and with the aim to end the shelling of neighboring Armenian villages by Azerbaijani forces.

According to the Russian human rights organization Memorial, dozens of civilians were killed by shelling during expulsion of Azerbaijani population from two villages.

== See also ==
- List of massacres of Azerbaijanis
- Battle of Shusha (1992)
