= Qızıl Kəngərli =

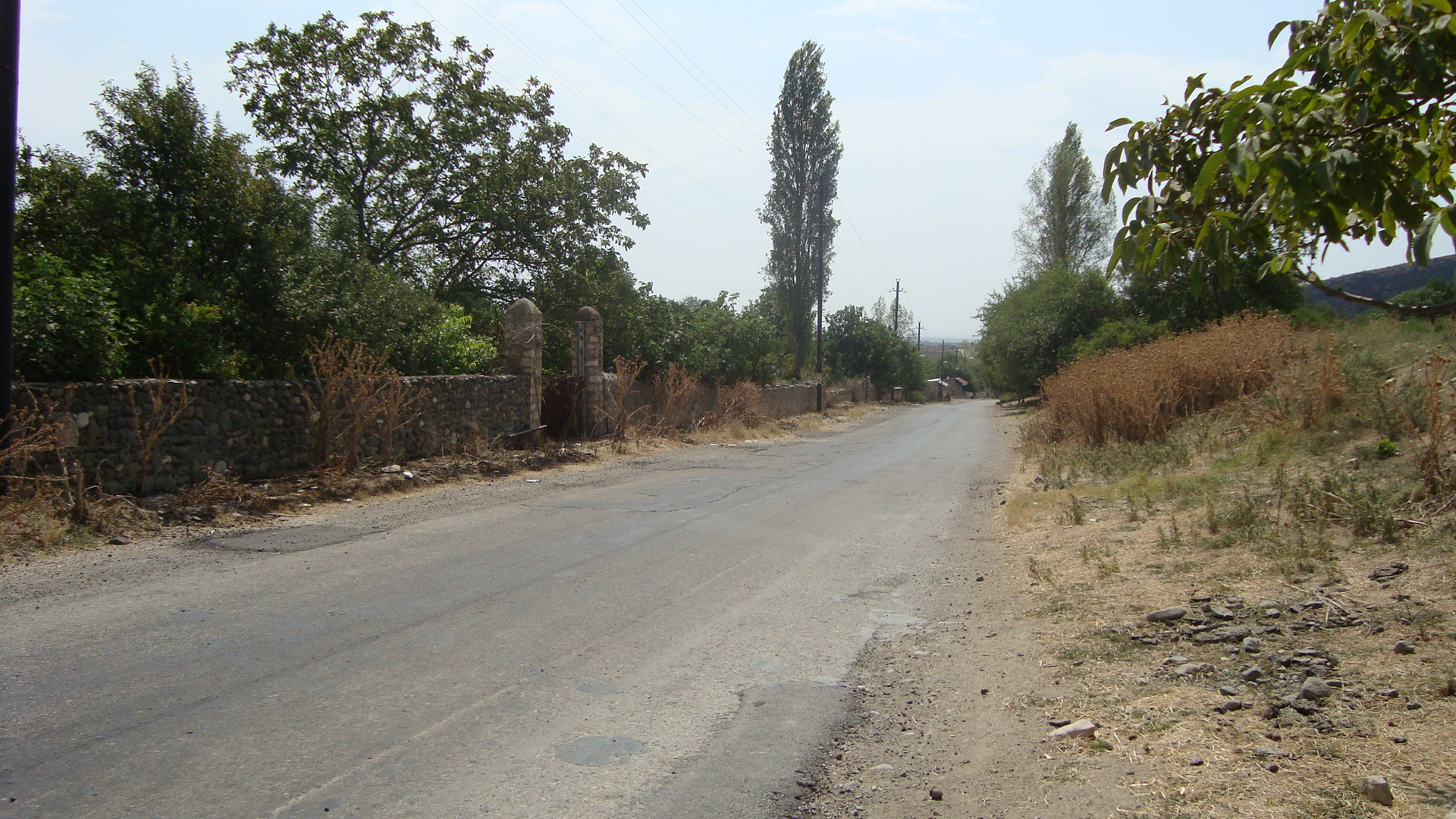

- Location within Azerbaijan
- Coordinates: 40°05′55.7″N 46°52′43.9″E
- Country: Azerbaijan
- District: Agdam

Population (2015)
  - Total: 529
- Time zone: UTC+4 (AZT)

Qızıl Kəngərli (Gyzyl Kangarli) is a village in the Agdam District of Azerbaijan.

== History ==
The village was located in the Armenian-occupied territories surrounding Nagorno-Karabakh, coming under the control of ethnic Armenian forces during the First Nagorno-Karabakh War in the early 1990s. The village subsequently became part of the breakaway Republic of Artsakh as part of its Martakert Province, where it was settled by refugees from the village of Maragha, and became known as Nor Maragha (Armenian: Նոր Մարաղա, lit. 'New Maragha'). It was returned to Azerbaijan as part of the 2020 Nagorno-Karabakh ceasefire agreement.

== Historical heritage sites ==
Historical heritage sites in and around the village include tombs from the 2nd–1st millennia BCE.

== Demographics ==
The village had 349 inhabitants in 2005, and 529 inhabitants in 2015.

== Gallery ==
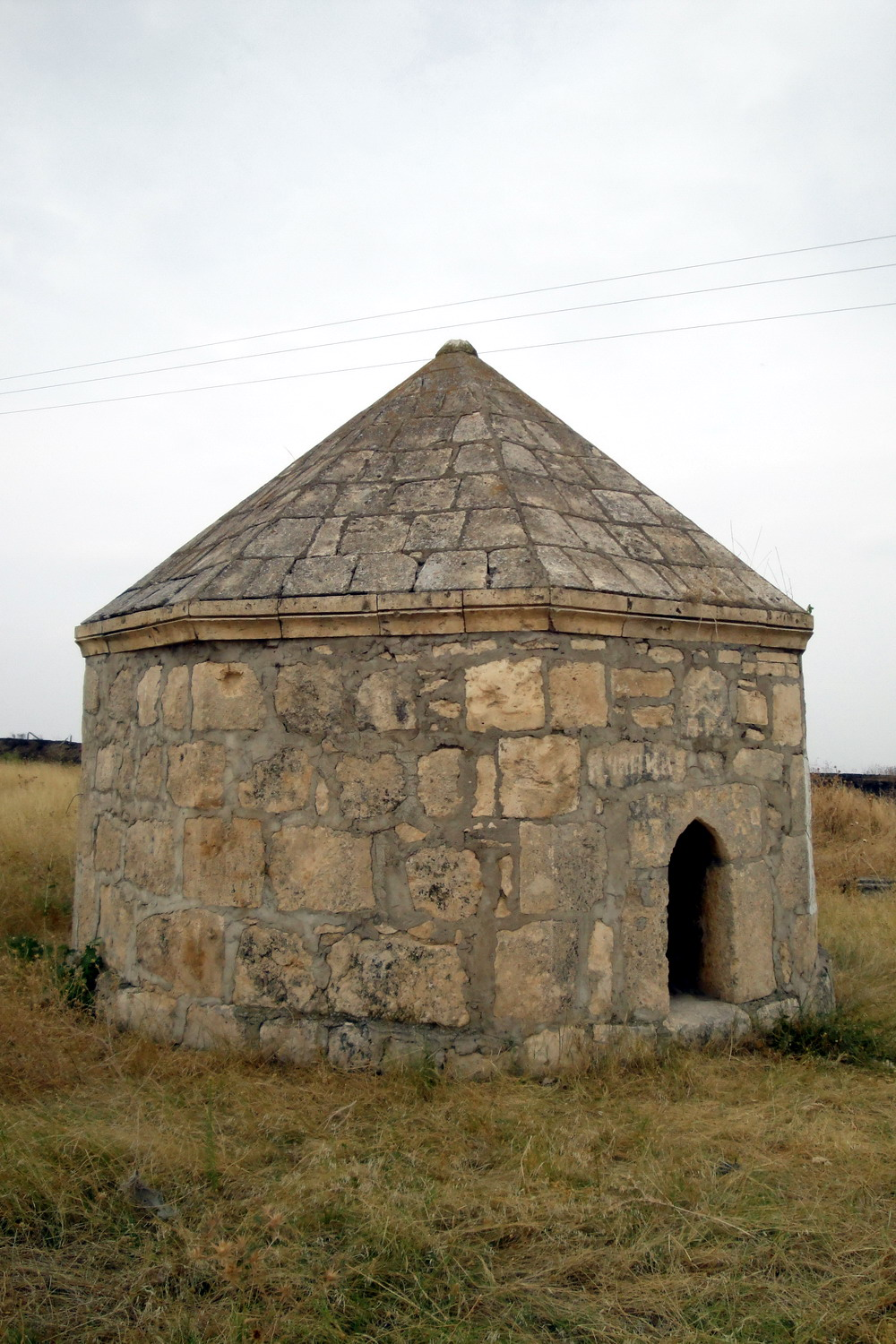
Tomb

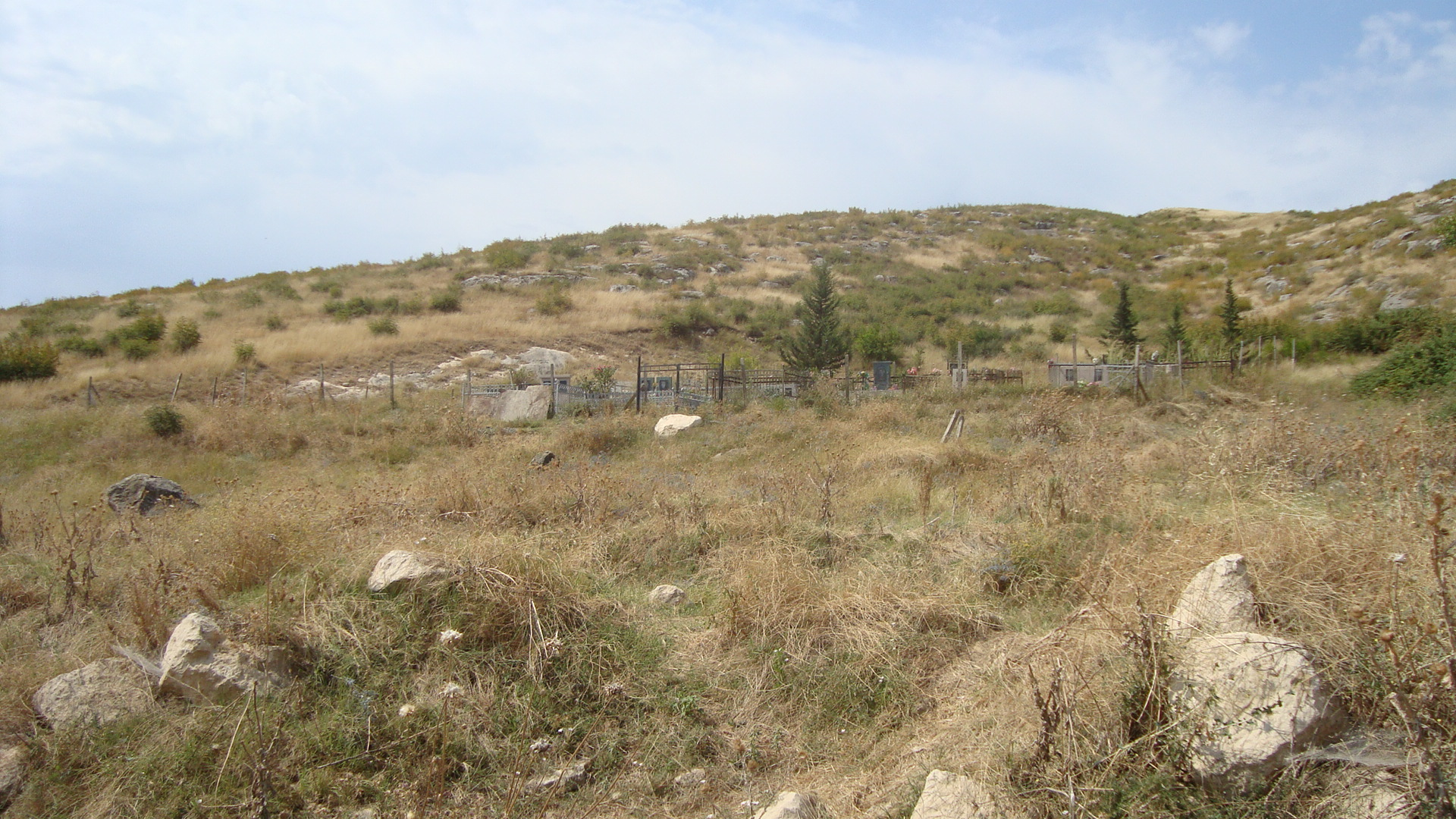
Cemetery

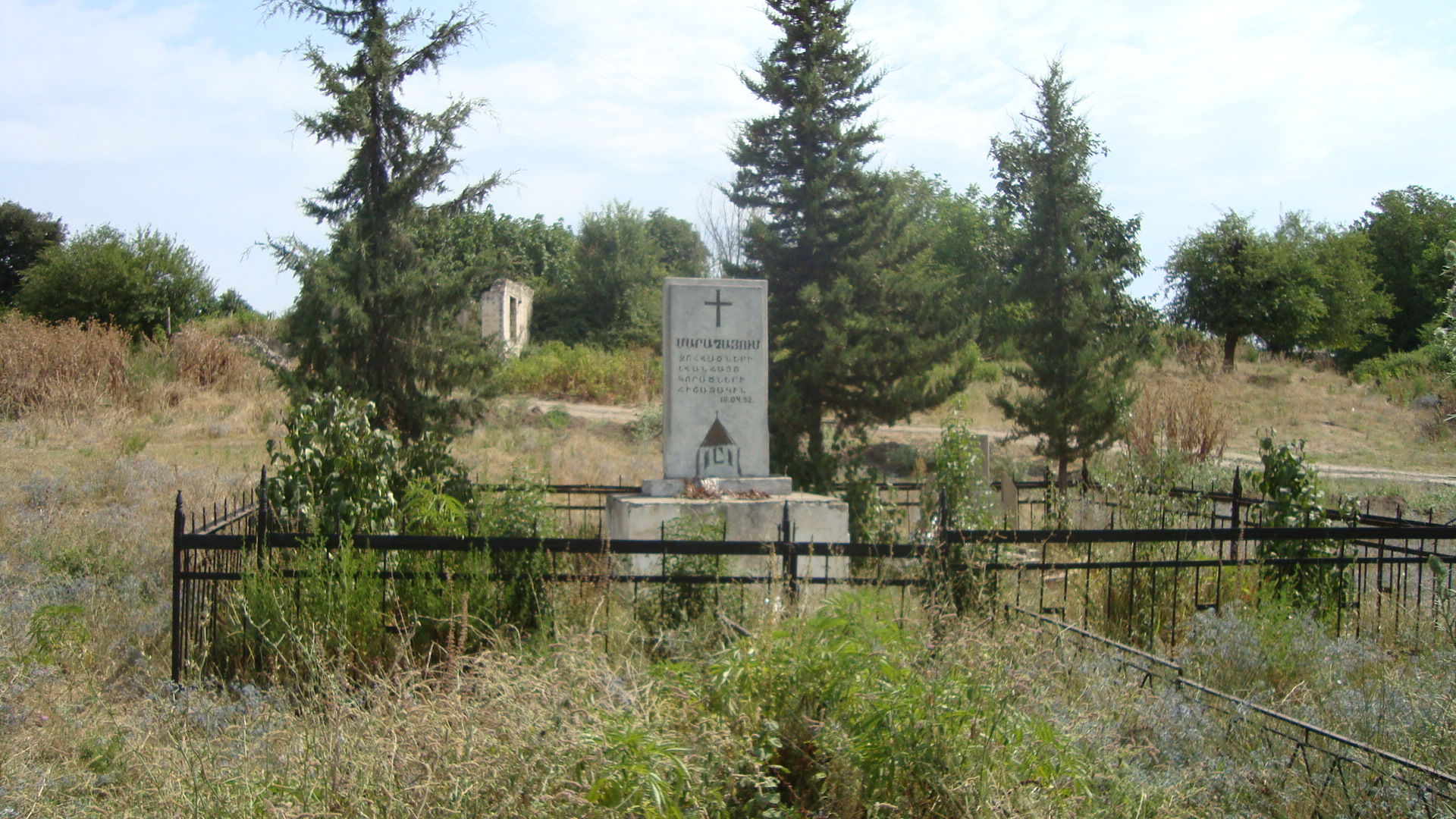
Monument to the victims of the Maraga massacre

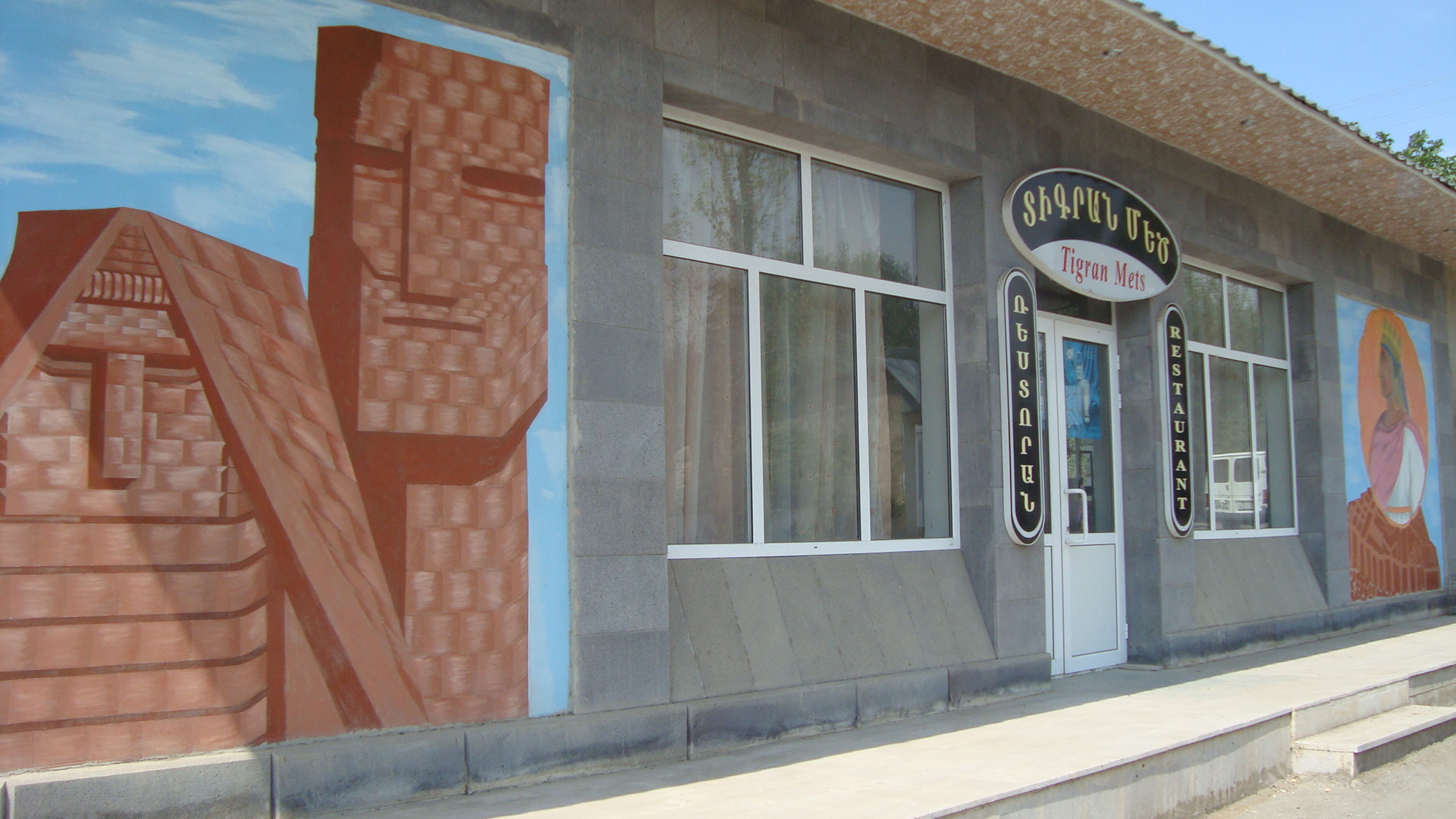
Restaurant
