= Teymurov =

Teymurov is a surname. Notable people with the surname include:

- Bahruz Teymurov (born 1994), Azerbaijani footballer
- Rizvan Teymurov (1967–1991), National Hero of Azerbaijan
