= Rizvan Teymurov =

National Hero of Azerbaijan

Nizami Mammadov
- Born: 16 April 1967; Ashaghy Gushchular, Shusha, Azerbaijan SSR
- Died: 9 December 1991 (aged 24); Karkijahan, Khankendi, Azerbaijan
- Military career
- Service years: 1990–1991
- Conflicts: First Nagorno-Karabakh War
- Awards: National Hero of Azerbaijan; 1992

Rizvan Teymurov (Azerbaijani: Rizvan Rəhman oğlu Teymurov) (16 April 1967, Ashaghy Gushchular, Shusha, Azerbaijan SSR, USSR – 9 December 1991, Karkijahan, Khankendi, Azerbaijan) was a National Hero of Azerbaijan and the warrior of the First Nagorno-Karabakh War.

== Life ==
He was born on April 16, 1967, in Ashaghy Gushchular, Shusha district of Azerbaijan SSR. In 1984, he graduated from the high school in the village of Gushchular. In 1985, he was called up for military service, completed his service in Omsk and returned to his homeland. Rizvan later worked in Arkhangelsk region in 1987. In 1990, he returned to Azerbaijan and started serving in the regiment of the Ministry of Internal Affairs of Azerbaijan established in Shusha.

=== Karabakh war ===
He fought against Armenian separatists in the villages of Garadağlı, Sırkhavand, Umudlu, Meshali, Jamilli. On December 9, 1991, he was killed during a clash in the village of Karkijahan.

== Memorial ==
By the decree of the President of the Republic of Azerbaijan dated October 8, 1992, Rizvan Rehman oglu Teymurov was awarded the title of National Hero of Azerbaijan (posthumously). One of the streets in Baku's Nizami district and also Guschular village high school are named after him. His bust was made in 2020.

== Awards ==
- (08.10.1992) — Gold Star Medal (Azerbaijan) (posthumously)

== See also ==
- List of National Heroes of Azerbaijan

== Sources ==
- Əsgərov, Vüqar (2005). Azərbaycanın Milli Qəhrəmanları (PDF). Baku: Qapp-poliqraf. p. 250.
