= Karabakh Governorate General =

Karabakh Governorate General Qarabağ general-qubernatorluğu
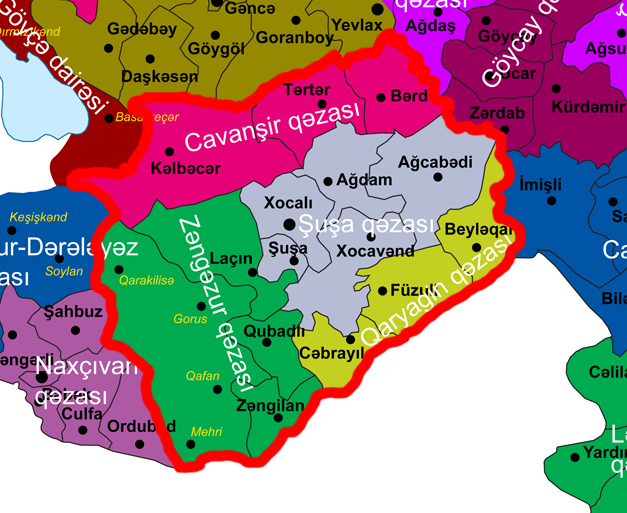
- Jevanshir, Jebrail, Shusha and Zangezur uezds that make up the Karabakh governorate general
- Capital: Shusha (January 15, 1919–April 29, 1920)
- Common languages: Azerbaijani Turkish
- Religion: Islam; Armenian Apostolic
- Government: Governor- generalship
  - Governor-general: Khosrov bey Sultanov
  - Deputy Governor General: Guda Gudiyev
- Historical era: Interwar period
  - Established: 15 January 1919
  - Sovietization: 29 April 1920

Population
  - 1919: 121.216
Preceded by	Succeeded by
Transcaucasian Democratic Federative Republic	Nagorno Karabakh Autonomous Oblast
- Today part of: Azerbaijan

Karabakh governorate-general (Azerbaijani: Qarabağ general-qubernatorluğu) was a temporary administrative regime established in Karabakh due to new territorial claims of Armenians against Azerbaijan during the Azerbaijan Democratic Republic.

== Creation and activity ==
Due to the events in Karabakh, the Ministry of Internal Affairs of the Azerbaijan People's Republic proposed the creation of a temporary governor general based on the uezds of Shusha, Jevanshir, Jebrail and Zangezur in early January 1919. The government accepted this proposal and on January 13, 1919, issued a decision to establish a temporary governor general in those provinces. Khosrov bey Sultanov was appointed to this position on January 29. Concerned about the steps of the Azerbaijani Government, Armenia made an open claim to Nagorno-Karabakh under such circumstances. In its response note on January 31, the Government of Azerbaijan stated that Karabakh is historically an integral part of Azerbaijan and assessed Armenia's objection to the establishment of the Karabakh governorate as an attack on Azerbaijan's sovereignty and an attempt to interfere in its internal affairs.

On February 1, 1919, Rotmistr Guda Gudiyev was appointed deputy of the governor-general of Karabagh, Khosrov Bey Sultanov.

== The fall ==
At the end of 1919, the Armenian government allocated 19 million manats for the "liberation" of Nagorno-Karabakh. As a result of all this, Armenian separatists became more active in March 1920. On March 22–23, demonstrations against Azerbaijan took place in Nagorno-Karabakh with the direct participation of Armenia and by order of Moscow. As a result of military and diplomatic measures of the Government of Azerbaijan, hostile activities of Armenians in Karabakh were prevented in late March–April. In the development of the events in Karabakh in this direction, the acts of disruption and sabotage carried out by Soviet Russia and the Bolsheviks within the country, who were preparing to implement their plans of aggression against the Azerbaijan Democratic Republic, played an important role. After the April occupation (1920) and the fall of the Azerbaijan People's Republic, the activities of the Karabakh Governorate were terminated.

== Sources ==
- Musa, Prof. Ismayil (2010). KARABAKH IN INDEPENDENT AZERBAIJAN HISTORY 1918-21. Visions of Azerbaijan. pp. 30–38.
- Азербайджанская Демократическая Республика: 1918–1920: законодательные акты. Azərbaycan Nəşriyyatı. 1998.
