= Kürdhacı =

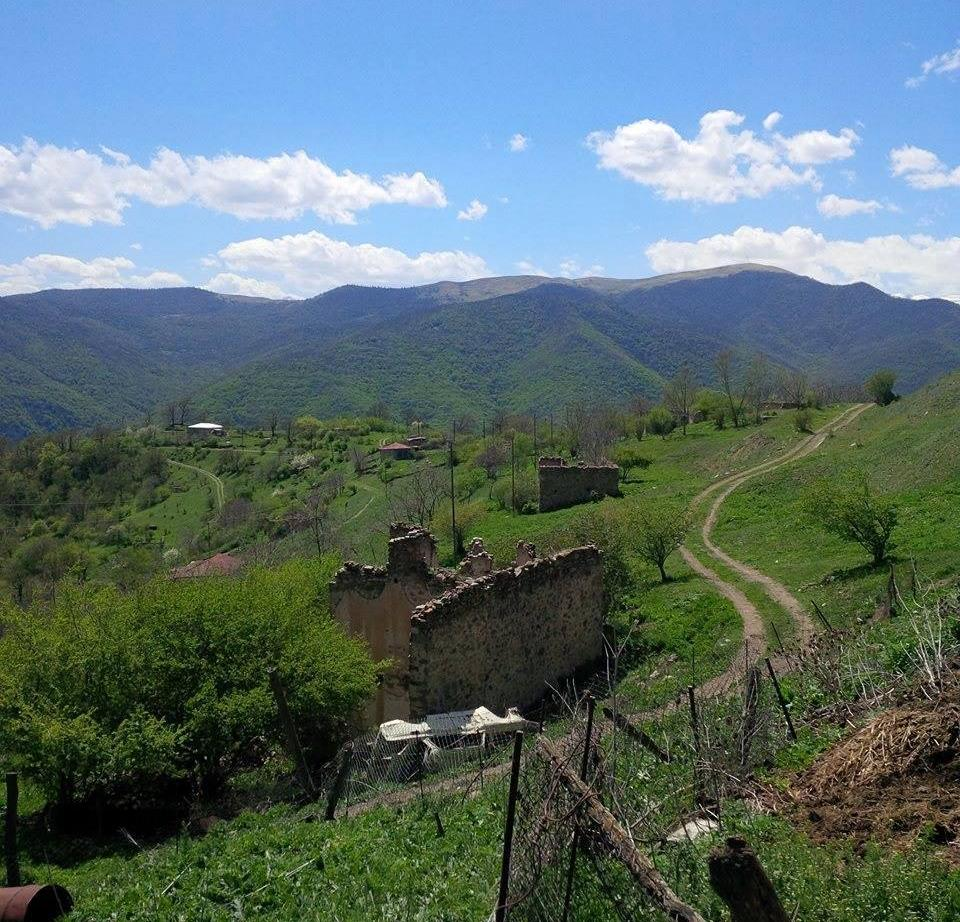

- Location within Azerbaijan Location within East Zangezur Economic Region
- Coordinates: 39°49′35″N 46°24′56″E
- Country: Azerbaijan
- District: Lachin

Population (2015)
  - Total: 19
- Time zone: UTC+4 (AZT)

Kürdhacı (Kurdhajy) is a village in the Lachin District of Azerbaijan.

== History ==
The village was located in the Armenian-occupied territories surrounding Nagorno-Karabakh, coming under the control of ethnic Armenian forces on May 29, 1992 during the First Nagorno-Karabakh War. It was briefly recaptured by Azerbaijani forces during Operation Goranboy in July 1992, the Azerbaijani forces later withdrew during 2–3 April 1993. The village subsequently became part of the breakaway Republic of Artsakh as part of its Kashatagh Province, referred to as Movsesashen (Armenian: Մովսեսաշեն). It was returned to Azerbaijan as part of the 2020 Nagorno-Karabakh ceasefire agreement.

== Gallery ==
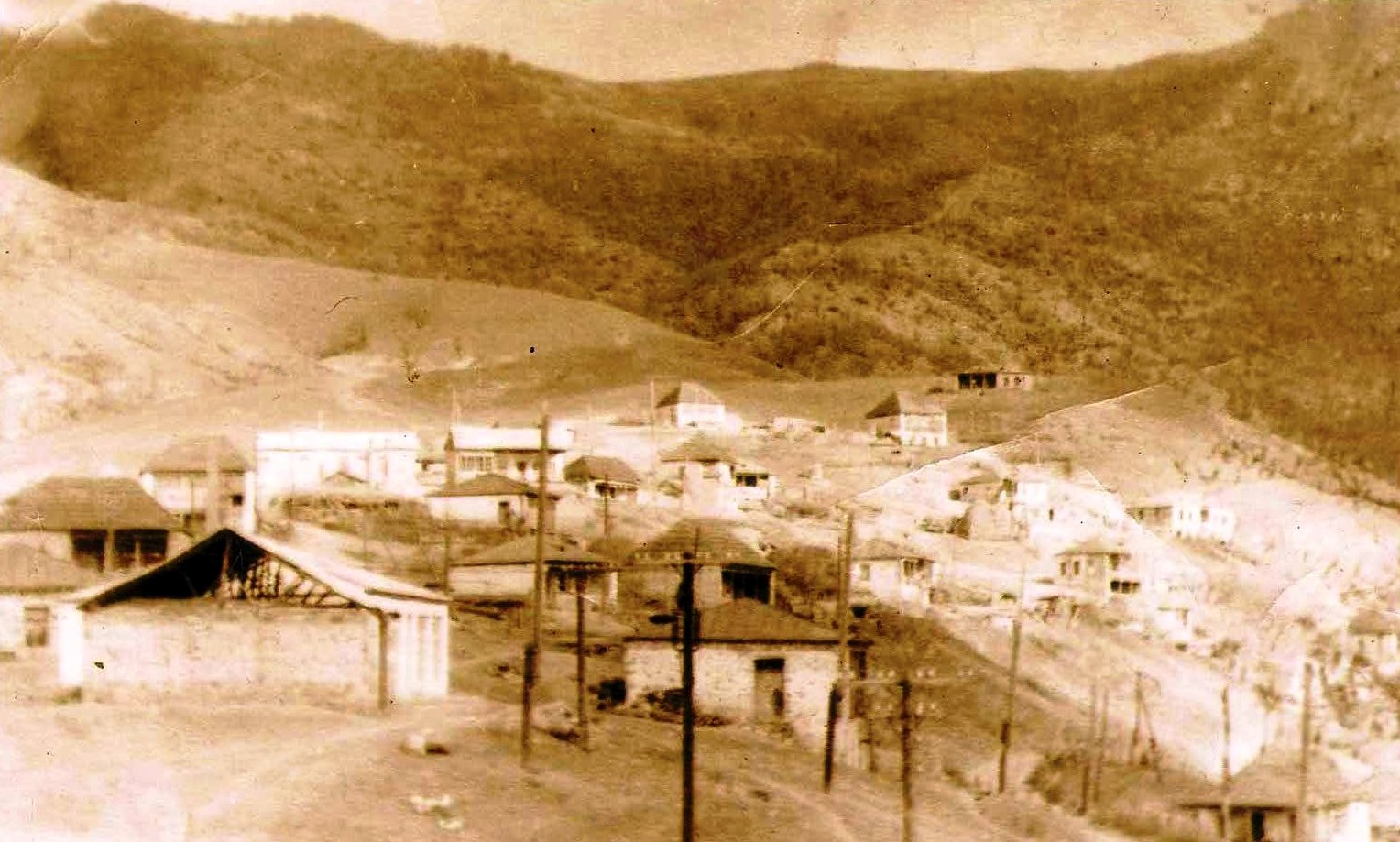

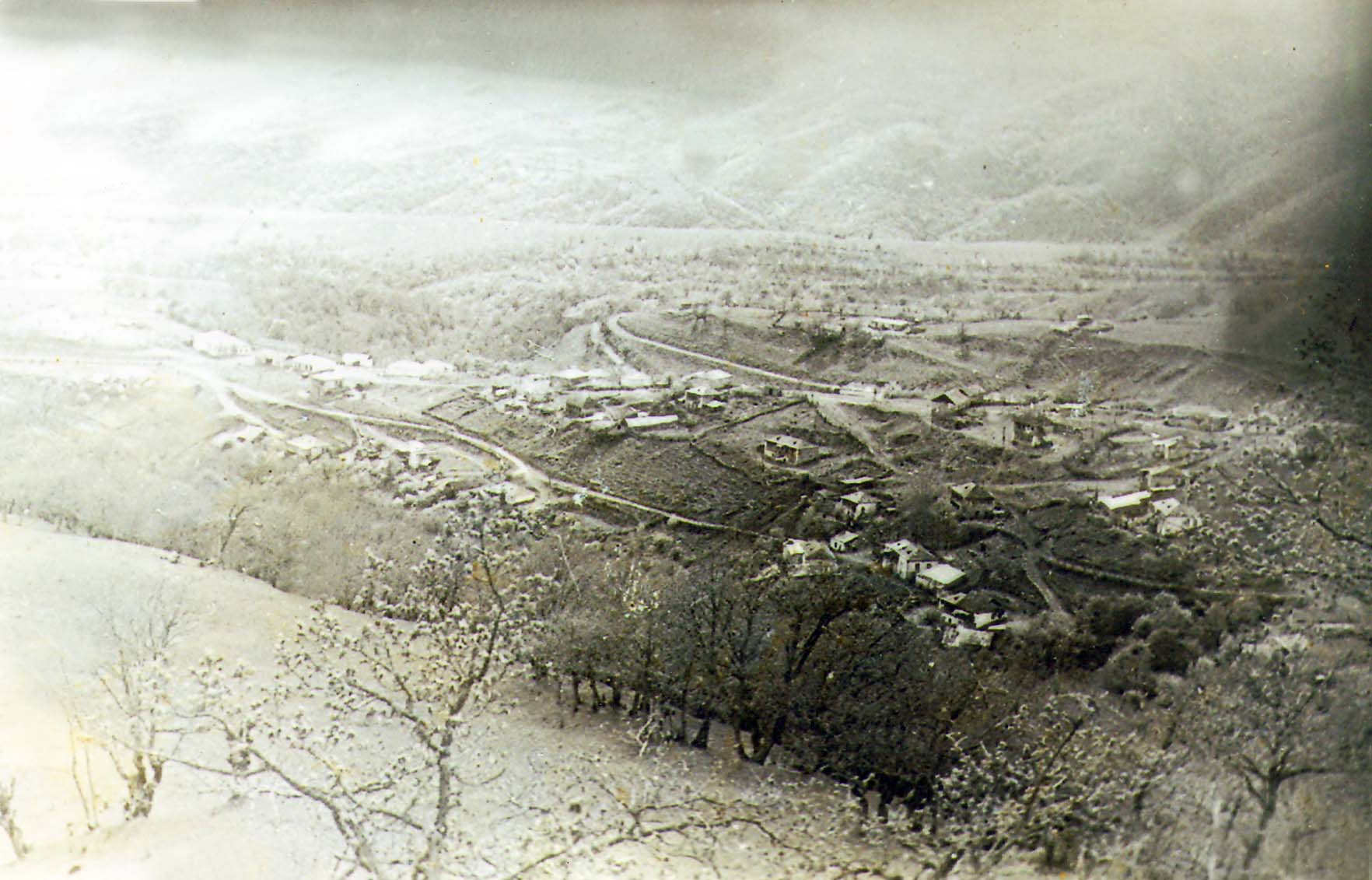

== Notable people ==
- Alasgar Novruzov — National Hero of Azerbaijan.
- Khosrov bey Sultanov — General Governor of Karabakh and Minister of Defense of Azerbaijan Democratic Republic.
- Sultan bey Sultanov — Folk Hero of Azerbaijan.
