= Shusha massacre =

1920 mass killing of Armenian civilians by Azerbaijani forces in Nagorno-Karabakh

- Part of the Armenian–Azerbaijani war (1918–1920)
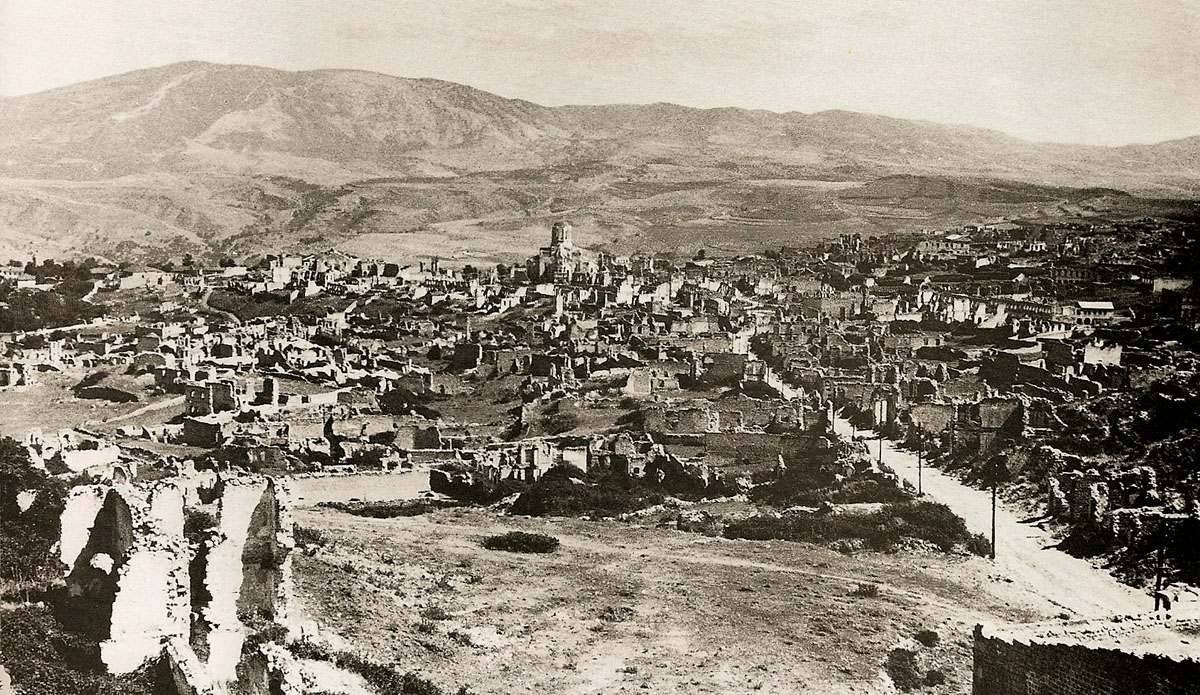
- Ruins of the Armenian half of Shusha after the city's destruction by the Azerbaijani army in March 1920. In the center: the defaced Armenian Ghazanchetsots Cathedral
- Location: Nagorno-Karabakh (disputed between Azerbaijan Democratic Republic and First Republic of Armenia)
- Date: March 1920
- Target: Armenian civilians
- Attack type: Massacre, pogrom
- Deaths: 500 (city); 30,000 (surrounding region)
- Perpetrators: Azerbaijani Army and Azerbaijani inhabitants of Shusha

The Shusha or Shushi massacre (Armenian: Շուշիի ջարդեր, romanized: Šušii ǰarder), also known as the Shusha pogrom, was the mass killing of the Armenian population of Shusha and the surrounding region from 22 to 26 March 1920. The number of deaths in the Armenian Quarter are estimated at 500, and in the surrounding region up to 30,000 Armenians were massacred.

== Background ==
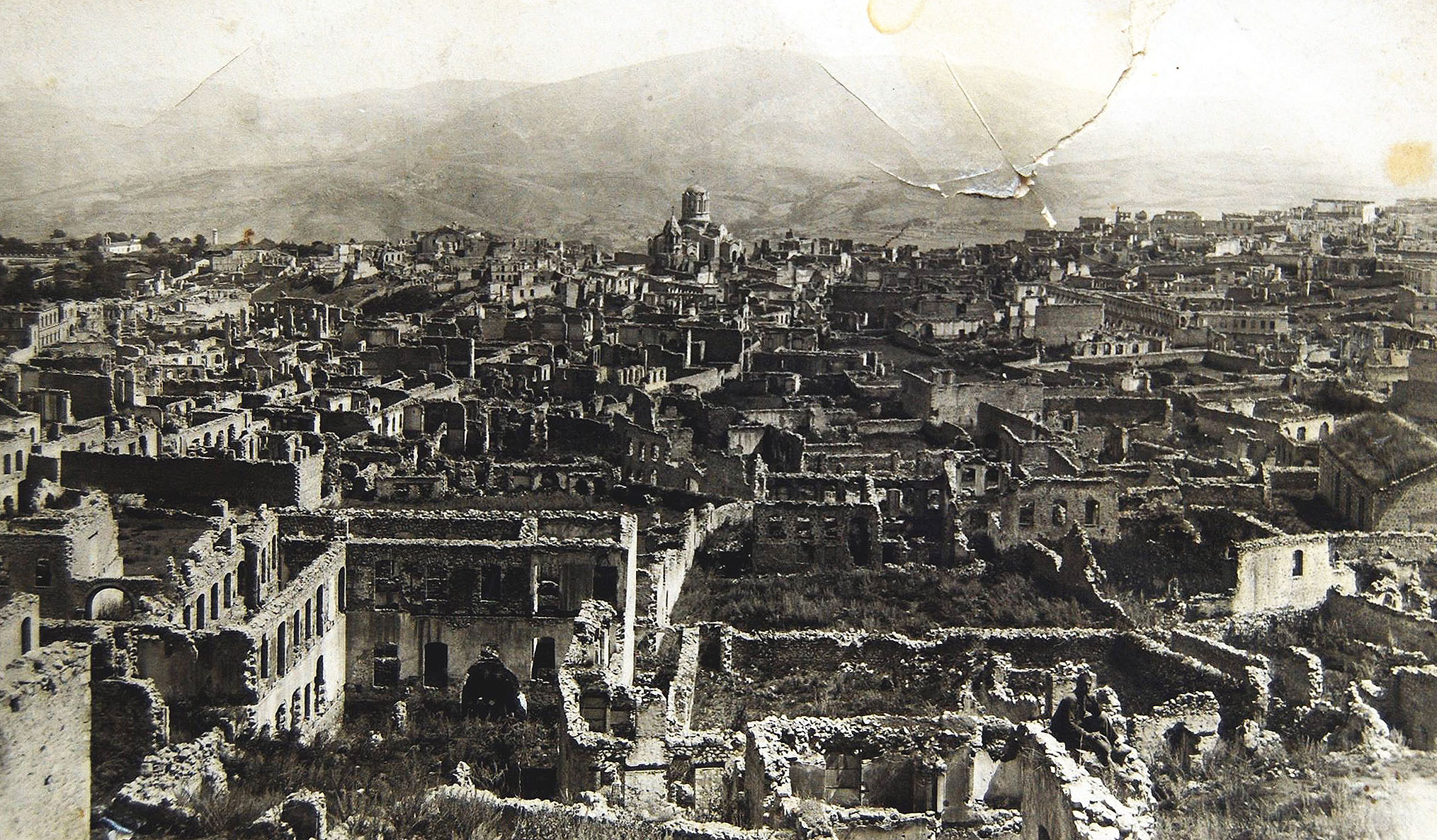
Shusha's Armenian quarters in the aftermath of their destruction by Azerbaijani army in March 1920. In the background: defiled Cathedral of the Holy Savior and Aguletsots church.

At the end of the First World War, the ownership of the territory of Nagorno-Karabakh was disputed between the newly established republics of the Armenia and Azerbaijan. Shusha—the territory's largest settlement, its centre for social and cultural life, and with a mixed population consisting mostly of ethnic Armenians and Azerbaijanis—found itself at the heart of the dispute. The government of Azerbaijan proclaimed in Baku the annexation of the disputed territory and, on 15 January 1919, appointed Khosrov bek Sultanov, as governor-general of Karabakh. The United Kingdom had a small detachment of troops stationed in Shusha and acceded to Sultanov's appointment as provisional governor, but insisted that a final decision on the territory's ownership could only be decided at a future peace conference.

In response to Sultanov's appointment, the General Assembly of the Armenians of Karabakh (Armenian National Council of Karabakh), meeting in Shusha from 10 to 21 February, issued a message stating that it "denies Azerbaijani authority in any form whatsoever." On 23 April 1919, the Karabakh Council convened in Shusha and again rejected Azerbaijan's claim of sovereignty, insisting on their right of self-determination. After this, a local Azerbaijani detachment encircled the Armenian quarters of Shusha and demanded that the inhabitants to surrender the fortress. Shots were fired, but by virtue of British mediation, the Armenians agreed to surrender to them instead. According to Colonel J.C. Rhea, acting Allied high commissioner, Sultanov "countenanced a polity of extermination of Armenians".

On 4 and 5 June 1919, armed clashes occurred in Shusha between the two communities and Sultanov began a blockade of the town's Armenian quarters. American nurses working in Shusha for Near East Relief wrote of a massacre "by Tartars of 700 of the Christian inhabitants of the town." A cease-fire was quickly organised after the Armenian side agreed to Sultanov's condition that members of the Armenian National Council leave the town. However, a new wave of violence then swept through neighbouring Armenian-populated villages: in mid-June Azerbaijani mounted "irregulars", about 2,000 strong, attacked, looted and burnt a large Armenian village, Khaibalikend, just outside Shusha, and approximately 600 Armenians lay dead.

The Seventh Congress of the Armenians of Karabakh was convened in Shusha on 13 August 1919. It concluded with the agreement of 22 August, according to which Nagorno-Karabakh would consider itself to be provisionally within the borders of the Republic of Azerbaijan until its final status was decided at the Peace Conference in Paris. As the historian Richard Hovhannisyan points out, the agreement concluded in August 1919 strictly limited the Azerbaijani administrative and military presence in the region and established the internal autonomy of Nagorno-Karabakh. Armenians remained divided on their response and a stock of arms was built up on both sides and the Armenians decided to deter a Tatar attack by staging an abortive uprising.

== Persecutions and uprising ==
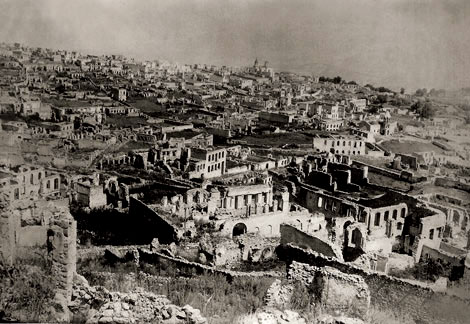
Ruins of the Armenian part of Shusha after the 1920 pogrom, including the church Servants of God).

The August agreement for Armenian autonomy and Azerbaijani demilitarization was violated by the Azerbaijani authorities almost immediately. Sultanov received orders from Baku to annex both Karabakh and Syunik. The Azerbaijani garrison was reinforced and troops were deployed without the required two-thirds consent of the Karabakh administration council. Turkish general Halil Kut had a leading role in Azerbaijani militarization and recruiting Muslim partisans. The Armenian population was forcibly disarmed. Azerbaijan imposed an economic blockade on Karabakh, which Armenian PM Alexander Khatisian accused of being intended to starve the Armenian population into submission.

Several incidences of Armenian travelers outside of Shusha being beaten, robbed, or killed occurred. On 22 February, up to 400 Armenians (per Armenian sources) in Khankend and Aghdam were massacred after an unidentified body was discovered, believed to be that of an Azerbaijani soldier. Two weeks later, that soldier reportedly returned to his company, having been a deserter. In March 1920, Sultanov began prohibiting Armenians from leaving Shusha without special permission, forced Armenian residents to quarter Azerbaijani soldiers, and began dismissing Armenians who had served as officers in the Russian army.

Matters came to a head on the evening of 22 March, when "the Varanda militia entered Shusha...supposedly to receive its pay and to felicitate Governor-General Sultanov on the occasion of Novruz Bairam," writes historian Richard G. Hovannisian. "That same night, about 100 armed men led by Nerses Azbekian slipped into the city to disarm the Azerbaijani garrison in the Armenian quarter. But everything went wrong. The Varanda militiamen spent most of the night eating and drinking and were late in taking up their assigned positions, whereas Azbekian's detachment, failing to link up with the militia, began firing on the Azerbaijani fort from afar, awakening the troops and sending them scurrying to arms." This jolted the Varanda militiamen from their initial dormancy, as they "began seizing Azerbaijani officers quartered in Armenian homes. The confusion on both sides continued until dawn, when the Azerbaijanis learned that their garrison at Khankend had held and, heartened, began to spread out into the Armenian quarter. The fighting took the Armenians of Shusha by surprise."

== Massacre ==
Immediately after the quelling of the uprising, Azerbaijani troops, along with city's Azerbaijani inhabitants, turned their wrath on Shusha' Armenian population. The city's churches were put to the flame, as were cultural institutions, schools, libraries, the business section, and the homes of wealthy Armenians. Bishop Vahan (Ter-Grigorian), who had sought a policy of accommodation with the Azerbaijani authorities, was murdered and beheaded, his "head paraded through the streets on a spike." Chief of police Avetis Ter-Ghukasian was "turned into a human torch," while hundreds of others were similarly murdered with impunity.

== Aftermath ==
Five to six thousand Armenians managed to escape by way of Dashalty (Karintak) to Varanda and Dizak. By 11 April 1920, some thirty villages in Nagorno-Karabakh had been "devastated" by Azerbaijani forces as a result of the uprising, leaving 25,000 homeless (including nearly 6,000 refugees from Shusha).

=== Death toll ===
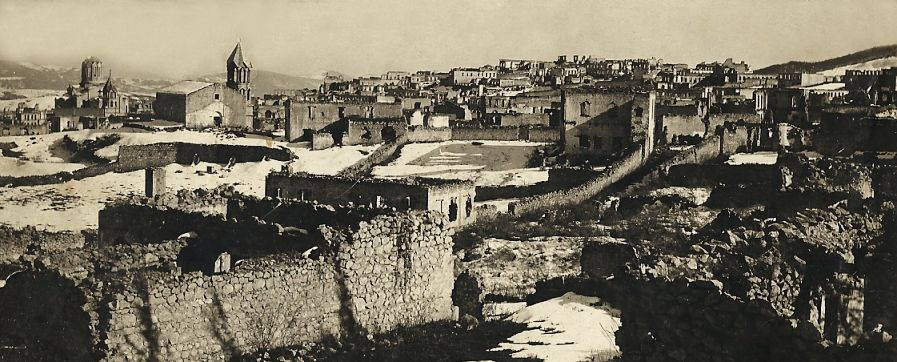
The Armenian quarter of Shusha after the massacre, with the Holy Saviour cathedral in the background.

According to the 1917 edition of Kavkazskiy kalendar, there were 43,869 residents in Shusha on 14 January [O.S. 1 January] 1916—the city was composed of 23,396 Armenians who formed 53.3 percent of the population and 19,091 Shia Muslims (mainly Azerbaijanis) who formed 43.5 percent of the population.

The total death toll of the Shusha massacre is unknown, with figures ranging from 500 to 30,000, depending on the source, definition and analysis. Armenian sources report that on the town of Shusha alone, during the pogrom, the deaths might've been around 500, but they also state that up to 30,000 were killed in the wider region as a whole in the days following the pogrom.

Citing a contemporary Armenian government report, Hovannisian places the death toll of the pogrom at 500 Armenians in the town itself and the destruction of many buildings in Shusha. (Note: Hovannisian also writes of a "Melkumian report" that claims that 5,000–6,000 were "left behind" during the massacre whilst 8,000 escaped.) German historian Jörg Baberowski states that the Armenian quarter of Shusha was "wiped off the face of the earth", indicated by 25 of 1,700 homes surviving the pogrom; also adding that 8,000 Armenians were massacred. Soviet historian Marietta Shaginyan wrote that 3–4 thousand or more than 12 thousand Armenians were killed and 7,000 homes were destroyed in three-days. The Great Soviet Encyclopedia entry for Shusha writes that "up to 20 percent of the population [of Shusha] died" when the city was burned. German historian Tessa Hofmann wrote that 20,000 Armenians were massacred in the days of and following the pogrom.

== Retribution ==
Former minister of internal affairs of Azerbaijan Behbud Khan Javanshir was assassinated during Operation Nemesis by members of the Armenian Revolutionary Federation, who suspected him of involvement in the massacre.

=== Memory ===
The prominent Russian poet Osip Mandelstam, who visited Shusha in 1930, wrote the poem "The Phaeton Driver" (1931) in memory of the massacre and burning:

So in Nagorno-Karabakh
These were my fears
Forty thousand dead windows
Are visible there from all directions,
The cocoon of soulless work
Buried in the mountains.

According to the description of an Azerbaijani communist Ojahkuli Musaev:

... the ruthless destruction of defenceless women, children, old women, old men, etc has begun. Armenians were exposed to mass slaughter. ... beautiful Armenian girls were raped, then shot. ... By the order of ... Khosrov-bek Sultanov; the pogroms proceeded for more than six days. Houses in the Armenian part have been partially demolished, plundered and reduced all to ashes, everyone led away women to submit to the wishes of executioner musavatists. During these historically artful forms of punishment, Khosrov-bek Sultanov, spoke about holy war (jihad) in his speeches to the Moslems, and called on them to finally finish the Armenians of the city of Shusha, not sparing women, children, etc.

Visiting Shusha with Osip, Nadezhda Mandelstam wrote, "in this town, which formerly, of course, was healthy and endowed with every amenity, the picture of catastrophe and massacres was terribly vivid ... They say after the massacres all the wells were full of corpses.... We didn't see anyone in the streets or on the mountain. Only in the centre of town, in the market-square, there were a lot of people, but there wasn't any Armenian among them, they were all Muslims." Numerous other communist officials recalled the destruction of the town, including Sergo Ordzhonikidze, Olga Shatunovskaya, Anastas Mikoyan, and Marietta Shaginyan. Russian-Georgian writer Anaida Bestavashvili drew a comparison between the burning of Shusha to the destruction of Pompeii in her The People and the Monuments.

On 20 March 2000, a memorial stone was laid in Shusha on the site of the planned monument to the victims of the pogrom. The Nagorno-Karabakh Republic government introduced a proposal to the National Assembly to establish 23 March as a day of memorial for the victims of the pogrom.

== See also ==
- List of massacres in Azerbaijan

== Bibliography ==
- "1920 թվականի Շուշիի կոտորածը" [The Shushi Massacre of 1920]. Republic.Mediamax.am (in Armenian). Archived from the original on 19 July 2022. Archived 19 July 2022 at the Wayback Machine
- Baberovski, Yorg (2010). Враг есть везде. Сталинизм на Кавказе [The enemy is everywhere. Stalinism in the Caucasus] (in Russian). Moscow: Rossiyskaya politicheskaya entsiklopediya (ROSSPEN) Fond «Prezidentskiy tsentr B. N. Yeltsina». p. 171. ISBN 978-5-8243-1435-9. Archived from the original on 8 October 2022. Archived 8 October 2022 at the Wayback Machine
- Bagdasaryan, Gegam (March 2015). "Три нераскрытых обстоятельства резни армян в Шуши" [Three unsolved circumstances of the massacre of Armenians in Shushi]. theanalyticon.com (in Russian). Stepanakert. Archived from the original on 14 November 2022. Archived 14 November 2022 at the Wayback Machine
- Geldenhuys, Deon (2009). Contested States in World Politics. Vol. 3. Berkeley: Palgrave Macmillan UK. ISBN 9780230234185.
- Great Soviet Encyclopedia. Vol. 17. New York: Macmillan. 1973. p. 301.
- Herzig, Edmund; Kurkchiyan, Marina (2005). The Armenians: Past and Present in the Making of National Identity. London: RoutledgeCurzon. ISBN 0-203-00493-0. OCLC 229988654.
- Hovannisian, Richard G. (1971). The Republic of Armenia. Vol. 1: The First Year, 1918–1919. Berkeley: University of California Press. ISBN 978-0520019843.
- Hovannisian, Richard G. (1996a). The Republic of Armenia. Vol. 3: From London to Sèvres, February–August 1920. Berkeley: University of California Press. ISBN 978-0520088030.
- Кавказский календарь на 1917 год [Caucasian calendar for 1917] (in Russian) (72nd ed.). Tiflis: Tipografiya kantselyarii Ye.I.V. na Kavkaze, kazenny dom. 1917. Archived from the original on 4 November 2021.
- "Letter from Avetis Aharonian, president of the delegation of the Republic of Armenia, addressed to the presidents of the delegations of Italy, France, England, and the U.S." Archived from the original on 2007-09-14. Archived 2007-09-14 at the Wayback Machine
- Lieberman, Benjamin (2013). Terrible Fate Ethnic Cleansing in the Making of Modern Europe. Rowman & Littlefield Publishers. ISBN 9781442230385.
- Mkrtchʻyan, Shahen (2008). Shoushi: The City of Tragic Fate. Yerevan: Gasprint.
- Smele, Jonathan D. (2015). Historical Dictionary of the Russian Civil Wars, 1916–1926. Lanham, Maryland. ISBN 978-1-4422-5281-3. OCLC 923010906.
- Welt, Cory D. (2004). Explaining ethnic conflict in the South Caucasus: Mountainous Karabagh, Abkhazia, and South Ossetia.
- Wright, John (2003). Transcaucasian Boundaries. Palgrave Macmillan UK. ISBN 978-0805079326.
- Ziemer, Ulrike (2014). Ethnic Belonging, Gender, and Cultural Practices Youth Identities in Contemporary Russia. Columbia University Press. ISBN 9783838261522.
