= Khosrov bey Sultanov =

Khosrov bey Sultanov Xosrov bəy Sultanov
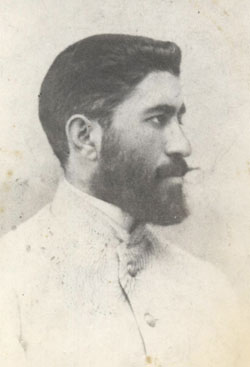
- Sultanov in 1920

Minister of Defense of Azerbaijan Democratic Republic
- In office 27 May 1918 – 11 June 1918
- President: Alimardan Topchubashov (Chairman of Azerbaijani Parliament)
- Preceded by: office established
- Succeeded by: office eliminated and re-established on 7 November 1918, to be led by Fatali Khan Khoyski

Governor General of Karabakh and Zangezur
- In office 15 January 1919 – 16 April 1920
- Preceded by: office established
- Succeeded by: office eliminated

Personal details
- Born: 10 May 1879 Kürdhacı, Zangezur uezd, Elizavetpol Governorate, Russian Empire
- Died: 7 January 1943 (aged 63) Istanbul, Turkey

Military service
- Allegiance: Azerbaijan
- Branch/service: Azerbaijani National Army
- Rank: Major General
- Battles/wars: World War I; Caucasus campaign; Armenian–Azerbaijani war

Khosrov bey Alipasha bey oghlu Sultanov (Azerbaijani: خسرو بگ علی پاشا بگ اوغلی سلطانوف, Xosrov bəy Əlipaşa bəy oğlu Sultanov; 1879 – 1943), also spelled as Khosrow Sultanov, was an Azerbaijani statesman, General Governor of Karabakh and Minister of Defense of the Azerbaijani Democratic Republic..

== Early life ==
Major General Sultanov was born on 10 May 1879 in Kürdhacı settlement of the Zangezur uezd of the Elizavetpol Governorate (present-day Lachin, Azerbaijan). Khosrov bey studied religion from early stages of his life. His father then sent him to school in Shusha. Sultanov first completed his education in Shusha and relocated to Yelisavetpol (Ganja) to study at a gymnasium. After completion of his secondary education, he moved to Odessa and studied at the Odessa Military School graduating with a degree in Medical Therapy.

During World War I, Sultanov led the Baku Muslim Relief Foundation of the Council for Placement of Refugees from Caucasian Front, set up in Tiflis to help with accommodation and relief of the refugees. In 1917, he joined Musavat Party and participated its first congress. He was also elected as a deputy to Transcaucasian Seim.

== Political career ==
=== Minister of Defense ===
Sultanov was one of the signatories of the Declaration of Independence of Azerbaijan Democratic Republic in Tiflis on 28 May 1918. He was appointed the Minister of Defense in the first government of Azerbaijan Democratic Republic. Although the office of the Minister of Defense was not officially established on paper, Khosrov bey assumed the duties of the minister until 11 June 1918. The Ministry of Defense was officially established on 23 October 1918, and office of the Minister of Defense was formally inaugurated on 7 November 1918, when Fatali Khan Khoyski took the office.

During his term as Defense Minister, Sultanov was to undertake the formation of the army. According to the parliament approved plan, the most important structures and divisions were to be established by 1 November 1919. Within the time given, two infantry divisions consisting of three regiments, artillery division, special telegraph, cavalry and machine gun platoons, railway battalions were to be created. Sultanov frequently visited the army units and checked the progress of army establishment.

=== Governor General of Karabakh and Zangezur ===
In January 1919, the British forces commander General William M. Thomson approved Sultanov's appointment as provisional Governor General of Karabakh and Zangezur (control over the latter was ultimately never established), pending a final decision at the Paris Peace Conference. This decision was strenuously opposed by the local Armenian community, led by the Karabakh Council, which favored unification with the Democratic Republic of Armenia, the Armenian government itself, as well as a number of American diplomats and relief officials working in the region, who cited his past collaboration with the Ottoman armies that had occupied the area in 1918. In response to criticism of Armenian leaders, Thomson said: "The fact is that in Azerbaijan some Armenians are much disappointed that the British occupation is not an opportunity for revenge. They are reluctant to accept it that the peace conference is going to decide and not military forces."

In mid-April 1919, conflicts in the Zangezur uezd began as Armenians and Muslim inhabitants clashed. The fighting resulted in the expulsion of the Muslims of central Zangezur down to steppes in the east and across the river to Persia. Sultanov requested his government to act and the de facto provisional Azerbaijani rule over Karabakh under Sultanov was recognized by the Allies.

==== Tension in Karabakh ====
Sultanov, however, was a widely hated figure by the Armenians of Karabakh, objected to his threats to compel them to fully submit to Azerbaijani rule. Tensions reached a high point on June 3, when Sultanov ordered his troops to encircle the Armenian quarter of Shusha and demanded that the members of the Karabakh Council and the Armenian militiamen holed up there to surrender. The Armenian barricades and the British military mission came under fire, but Sultanov's troops were unable to dislodge the defenders. Although the Karabakh Council relented on June 4, the next day Sultanov called on the cavalry commanded by his brother, Sultan, to attack the nearby Armenian villages of Khaibalikend, Krkejan, Pahliul, Jamillu, leaving at least six hundred Armenians dead and the settlements in ruins. Amid protests by Armenians and American relief officials, Sultanov was recalled to Baku. Conflicting reasons are given for this: the Azerbaijani government insisted that they had recalled him for consultations; the British command in Tiflis announced that he had been deprived of his position and was facing charges; while American reports stated that he had been arrested and imprisoned.

Though Sultanov denied any wrongdoing, an investigation carried out by the British military concluded that he had instigated the massacres to take place. But by the end of June, Sultanov had returned to his post to resume his activities, presumably with the support of Colonel D.I. Shuttleworth, Thomson's successor; seeing that further resistance was futile, the Karabakh Armenians agreed to submit to provisional Azerbaijani rule in the region in exchange for their cultural and civic rights. Among other things, the compact stipulated that Sultanov establish a joint Armeno-Muslim administrative council which would limit the movement of the Azerbaijani forces in the region. The agreement was signed on 22 August 1919. Sultanov, in turn, appointed an Armenian as his assistant in civil affairs in addition to three Armenians who were to serve on the council established by the agreement. The earlier blockades to Armenian areas were also lifted.

Although relations started to normalize, enmity between the communities remained with Armenian nationalist resentment towards the Karabakh leadership and Azerbaijani desire for permanent rule rising. Despite the agreement, Sultanov almost immediately violated all these terms; he increased the sizes of Azerbaijani garrisons in Shusha and Khankendi and moved his forces without the council's approval.

In the beginning of 1920, Sultanov intensified his efforts to bring control of the region under Azerbaijani rule by issuing an ultimatum to the Armenian National Council. In early 1920, the Paris Peace Conference had recognized Azerbaijan's de facto claim to Karabakh. But since the conference had ended without issuing a conclusive decision on Karabakh, Sultanov advocated for a local solution, one which demanded that the region be incorporated into Azerbaijan. He bolstered the size of the garrisons at Khankendi and continued to move his troops around, once more without the required consent of his administrative council. Ethnic tension in Karabakh heightened once more, as Azerbaijani troops lynched and killed several Armenians in Khankendi and pillaged the surrounding areas in February of that year. In early March, after a delegation of Karabakh Armenians met in the village of Shosh and rejected the possibility of union with Azerbaijan, Sultanov sought to tighten his control of Karabakh: he forbade Armenians from leaving Shusha without permission, stationed Azerbaijani troops in Armenian homes, ordered Armenian veterans of the former Russian Army to register so that they may not partake in military activities, and drew up plans to destroy several Armenian villages to sever the link between Armenians in Karabakh and the region of Zangezur. In March 1920, mass killings of the Armenian population took place in the Shusha massacre.

=== Post-sovietization ===
In late April 1920, the 11th Red Army effortlessly entered Azerbaijan and proclaimed it a Soviet republic. Upon hearing this, Sultanov abandoned his loyalty to the Musavat Party, declared himself the chairman of the "Karabagh Revolutionary Committee" and extended felicitations to the Azerbaijani Revkom leader Nariman Narimanov in Baku. He claimed that "revolutionary Karabagh" was now waiting impatiently for the establishment of Soviet order and desired to unite with Soviet Azerbaijan. Narimanov, however, was not convinced by Sultanov's declarations, and on May 14 he appointed Dadash Bunyadzade as extraordinary commissar for Karabakh and ordered him to liquidate Sultanov's self-styled Revkom.

== Later years ==
Following persecution by the Bolsheviks, Sultanov managed to flee to Turkey in 1923 and from then on, lived in Iran, France and Germany. In Germany, he was a professor at a medical university. In 1941–1945, during World War II, he played a significant role in bringing Azerbaijani prisoners of war back to Azerbaijan. After long time in Europe, Sultanov went back to Turkey in 1936 and died in Istanbul in 1943.

== See also ==
- Azerbaijani Army
- Ministers of Defense of Azerbaijan Republic
- List of massacres in Azerbaijan
