= Maraga massacre =

Mass murder of Armenian civilians

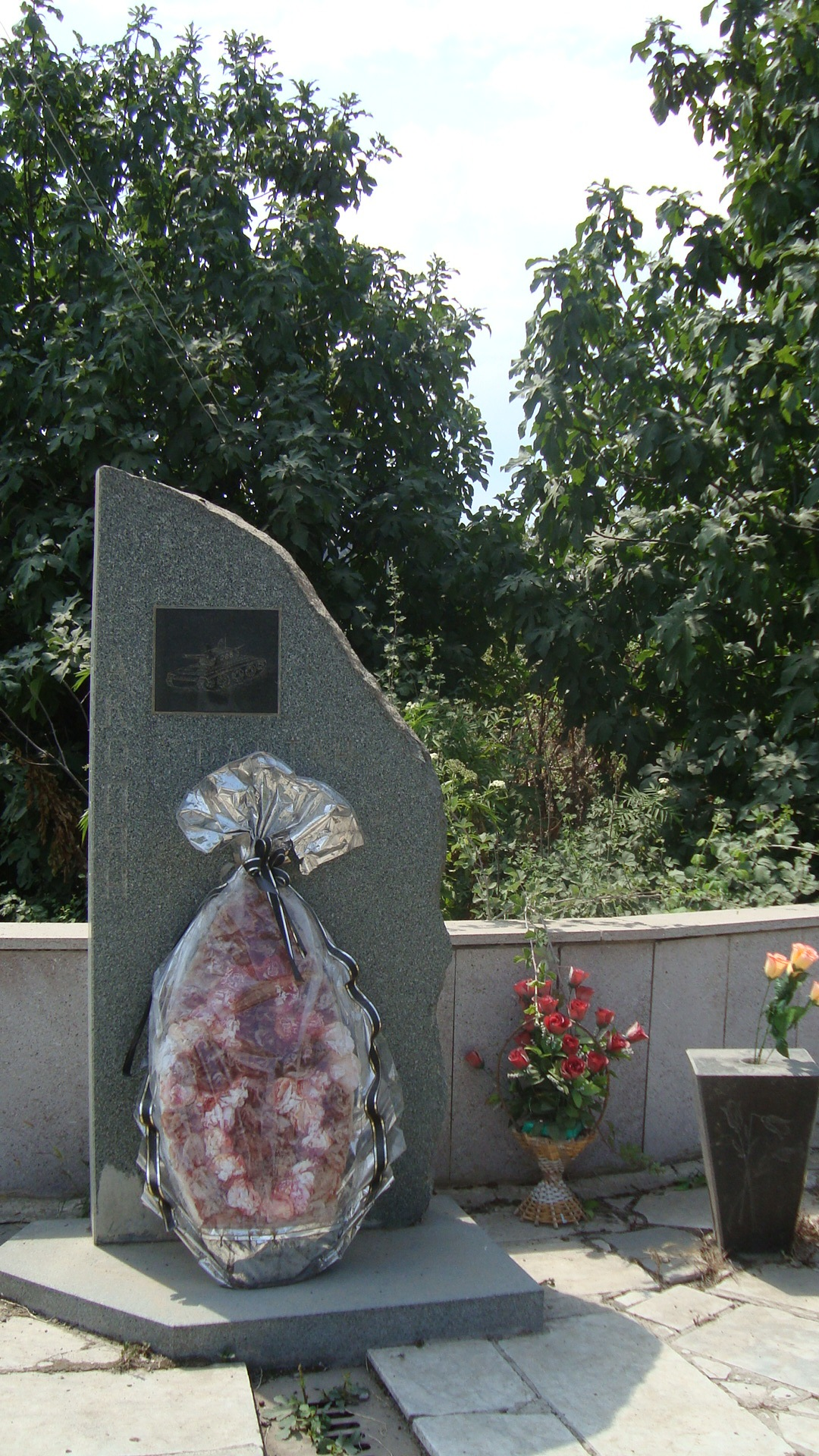
- Maraga massacre memorial in Nor Maragha
- Location: 40°19′48″N 46°52′48″E; Maraga, Nagorno-Karabakh
- Date: April 10, 1992; 34 years ago
- Target: Local Armenian population
- Deaths: 43–100 killed
- Injuries: Unknown
- Perpetrator: Azerbaijani Armed Forces

The Maraga massacre (Armenian: Մարաղայի կոտորած, romanized: Maraghayi kotorats) was the mass murder of Armenian civilians in the village of Maraga (Maragha) by Azerbaijani troops, which had captured the village on April 10, 1992, in the course of the First Nagorno-Karabakh War. The villagers, including men, women, children and elderly, were killed indiscriminately and deliberately, their houses were pillaged and burnt; the village was destroyed. Amnesty International reports that over 100 women, children and elderly were tortured and killed and a further 53 were taken hostage, 19 of whom were never returned.

== Background ==
The village of Maraga (Leninavan) was located in the Martakert region of Nagorno Karabakh, just across the border from the Azerbaijani town of Tartar (also known as Terter and Mir-Bashir) and was one of the region's largest villages. According to the census of 1989 the village had a population of 4660, predominantly ethnic Armenians including a few Armenian families who escaped pogroms but were forcefully deported from Sumgait, Baku, and other areas of Soviet Azerbaijan.

By spring 1992 the conflict in Nagorno-Karabakh escalated. Azerbaijan tightened the blockade which it had imposed on Nagorno-Karabakh for about two years, at the same time employing policy of ethnic cleansing and military assaults against the Armenians in Karabakh. The bordering villages of Karabakh were systematically raided and shelled by Azerbaijani armed forces. The event was described as an act of revenge after the Khojaly massacre.

== Attack on the village ==
On April 10, 1992 Maraga was attacked by the Azerbaijani forces. Early in the morning artillery fire started, followed by a ground assault from neighboring Mir-Bashir. By the afternoon, Azerbaijan's regular army forces entered the village with tanks, followed by infantry, and followed by looters. By that time according to the data of Human Rights Watch the village had 500 residents. As the result of the attack most of the village was burnt and destroyed, 57 residents of the village were killed, 45 civilians were taken hostages including men, women and children.

A preliminary investigation was carried out by Human Rights Watch (HRW, Helsinki Watch) and published in 1992. Having spoken to the only eyewitness available to them at the time, an Armenian fighter who took part in the village's defense, the report outlined that Maraga's defense detachments were unable to hold their positions when units of the Azerbaijani army attacked the village on April 10: they retreated to a spot overlooking the village and called for help. According to Armenian fighters, the Azerbaijanis had about 20 armored vehicles, and the lack of adequate weaponry on the Armenian side made it impossible for them to repel the attack. The defending units notified the villagers of their retreat and most of the inhabitants left the village, while the civilians who remained, mainly consisting of the elderly and the disabled, hid in basements and underground shelters.

Two weeks later the Azerbaijani forces launched another attack on the village. 13 civilians were taken hostage, and the remaining population was then forcibly deported. The whole village was then razed to the ground.

== Massacre ==
The Azerbaijani army captured Maraga the same day (April 10) and massacred the civilian population. The village was retaken by the Armenians the next day. The Armenian fighters reported finding the bodies of 43 civilians, most of whom were mutilated.

The massacre was marked by extreme acts of cruelty and slaughter. Azerbaijani soldiers sawed off the heads of 45 villagers, burnt others, took 100 women and children away as hostages, looted and set fire to all the homes, and left with all the pickings from the looting. According to eyewitness accounts people were decapitated, tortured (such as being dragged tied to a tank or being burnt alive), bodies were mutilated, dissected and burnt; non-combatants, among them men, women and children, were captured and taken hostage.

Vice-Speaker of the British Parliament's House of Lords Caroline Cox, who visited Maraga, gave a testimony, stating that she, along with a team from Christian Solidarity International, arrived within hours to find "homes still smoldering, decapitated corpses, charred human remains, and survivors in shock."

Then, Amnesty International reported that over 100 residents of the village were "slain, while their bodies were profaned and disfigured." According to Amnesty International, forty-five residents of the village were taken hostage. It also reported that the Azerbaijani forces attacked the village again weeks later and its population was deported, adding that the houses were pillaged and then most of them were burnt down. The bodies of the dead were later buried in a mass grave near the village. Besides those killed about 57 people, among them 30 men, 21 women, and 6 children, had gunshot wounds. Those hostages who were later exchanged had suffered humiliation, torture and psychological traumas. The fates of other hostages remain unknown.

== Investigations ==
=== Human rights groups ===
Accounts differ on precisely how many people were killed in the attack. A 1993 Country Dossier Report by Amnesty International gave 45 killed. According to Gevorg Petrossian, Chairman of the Parliament of Nagorno-Karabakh Republic, 53 civilians were killed, although the 1992 report by HRW expressed uncertainty as to whether those reported killed were civilians or combatants. It assumed, however, that the figure included the 43 Armenians who were killed by the Azerbaijanis. In 1992, HRW received a report that 50 Armenians had been taken hostage in the attack on Maraga.

=== Baroness Cox and Christian Solidarity International ===
Baroness Caroline Cox, an advocate of the Armenian cause in the Nagorno-Karabakh conflict, who led a delegation that observed the damage and interviewed eyewitnesses, stated that after Azerbaijani forces attacked Maraga, they decapitated about forty-five villagers, burned and looted much of the town, and kidnapped about one hundred women and children. A more detailed report of the findings of Cox and Christian Solidarity International was published in 1993.

Maraghar: the name of this village is associated with a massacre which never reached the world’s headlines, although at least 45 Armenians died cruel deaths. During the CSI mission to Nagorno Karabakh in April, news came through that a village in the north, in Martakert region, had been overrun by Azeri-Turks on April 10 and there had been a number of civilians killed. A group went to obtain evidence and found a village with survivors in a state of shock, their burn-out homes still smoldering, charred remains of corpses and vertebrae still on the ground, where people had their heads sawn off, and their bodies burnt in front of their families. 45 people had been massacred and 100 were missing, possibly suffering a fate worse than death. In order to verify the stories, the delegation asked the villagers if they would exhume the bodies which they had already buried. In great anguish, they did so, allowing photographs to be taken of the decapitated, charred bodies. Later when asked about publicizing the tragedy, they replied they were reluctant to do so as 'we Armenians are not very good at showing our grief to the world.'

Baroness Cox has called the Maraga Massacre "an apparent crime against humanity" and urged the international community to hold Azerbaijan accountable for that.

== Aftermath ==
The Azerbaijani officers directly involved in the massacre were never held responsible or tried for the crimes they committed in Maraga. At the same time the Azerbaijani side has not responded to the accusations of Maraga massacre.

The events in Maraga were not covered by international media and there is little awareness in the world about the events in this village, despite the severity of the actions. Cox explained that she hadn't brought journalists together with her to Maraga on those days because it was dangerous, but she made many photographs which are printed in her book Ethnic Cleansing in Progress. Cox also said in her interview that English newspaper Daily Telegraph had agreed to print her report on Maraga massacre but then they refused to do so.

Maraga village is currently controlled by the Azerbaijani army. The former residents of the village now live in Russia, Armenia and other parts of Nagorno-Karabakh. Those living in Russia are unable to return to Karabakh because of the lack of funds to cover travel expenses. The residents of Maraga who stayed in Karabakh have rebuilt another village on the ruins of another village in Nagorno-Karabakh, not far from Maraga. This new village is now called Nor Maraga (New Maraga). There has been a monument erected in New Maraga commemorating the victims of the massacre.

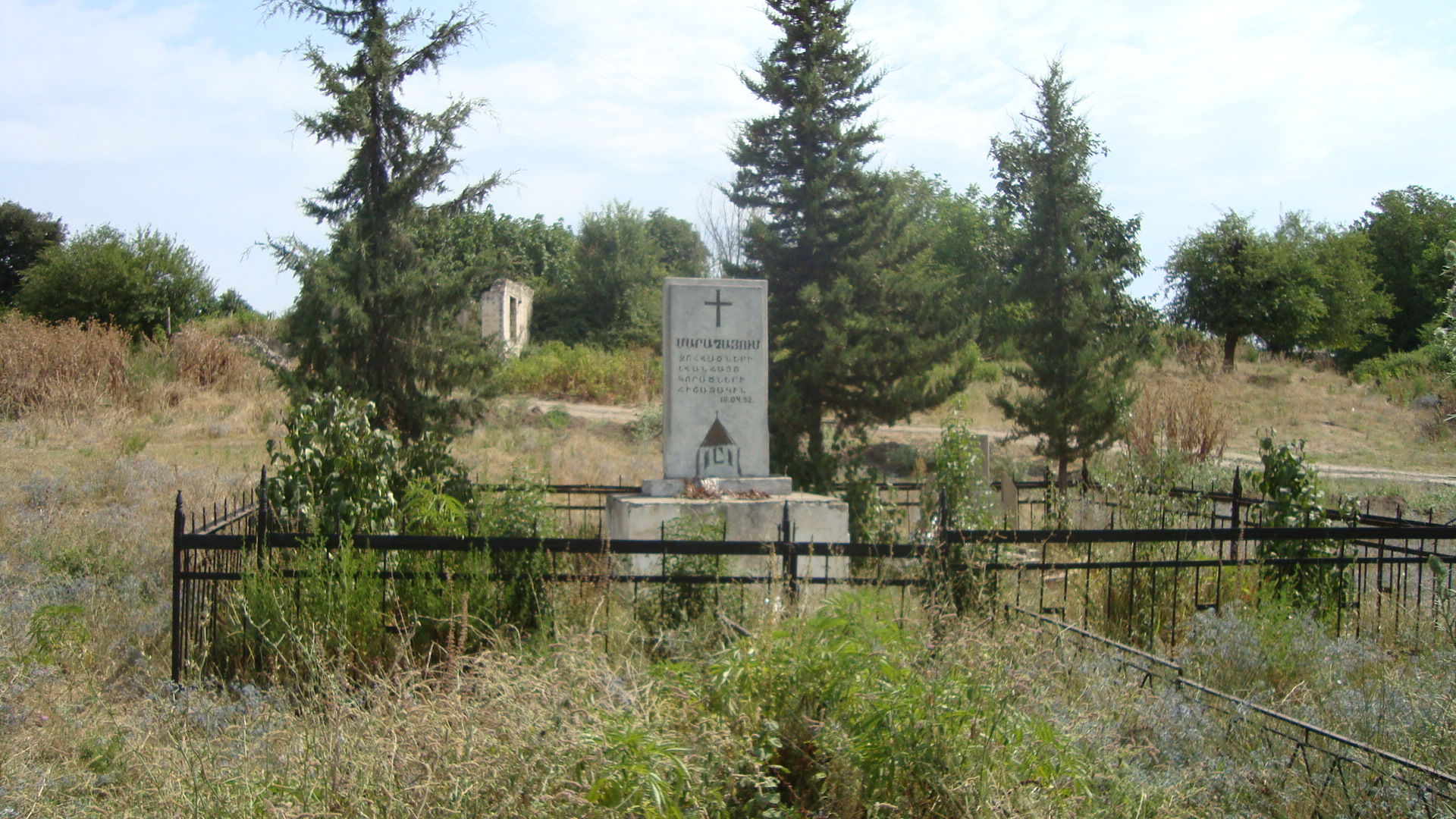
A monument for the victims of the massacre in Nor Maraga village.

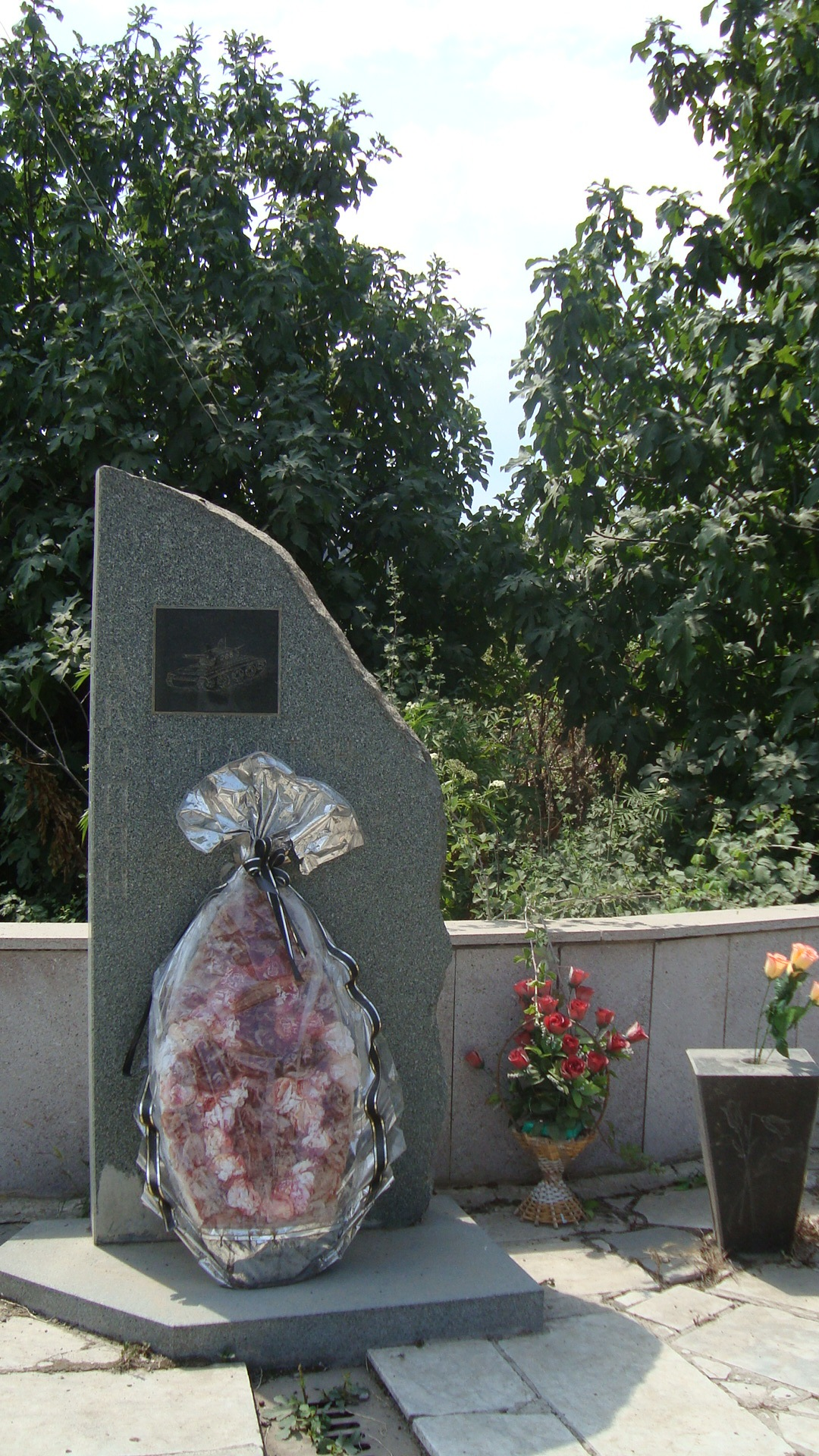
A monument in the village of Nor Maraga, built in honor of the Armenian defenders of Maraga.

Caroline Cox said:

The suffering of your people [should] somehow [be] recognized and they will therefore receive justice and the right to live in peace and freedom in their land… [I]t is impossible for the Armenians who live in Artsakh (Nagorno-Karabakh) ever again to accept Azeri sovereignty.

== See also ==
- List of massacres in Azerbaijan
- Anti-Armenianism
- Anti-Armenian sentiment in Azerbaijan
- Sumgait pogrom
- Baku pogrom
- Kirovabad pogrom
- Shelling of Stepanakert
- First Nagorno-Karabakh War
