= Malibeyli =

Malibeyli / Ajapnyak Malıbəyli / Աջափնյակ
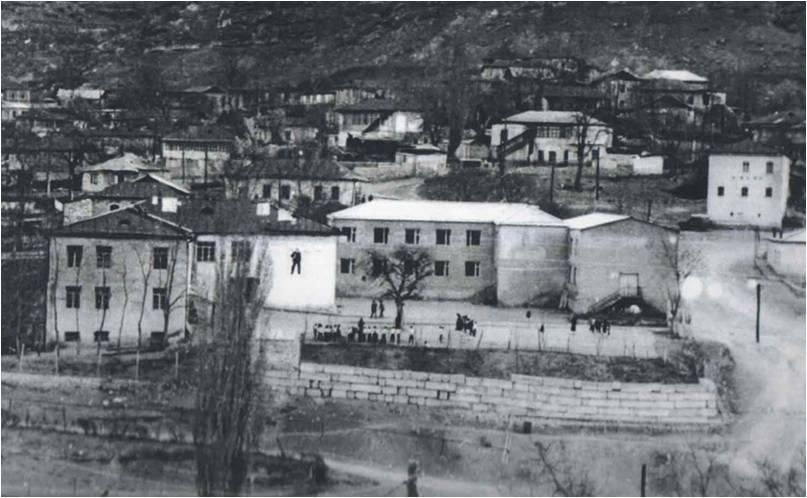

- Location within Azerbaijan
- Coordinates: 39°49′46″N 46°47′36″E
- Country: Azerbaijan
  - District: Khojaly
- Time zone: UTC+4 (AZT)

Malibeyli (Azerbaijani: Malıbəyli) or Ajapnyak (Armenian: Աջափնյակ) is a village located in the Khojaly District of Azerbaijan. It was part of Shusha District with Aşağı Quşçular and Yuxarı Quşçular villages till 5 December 2023.
