= Bahlul, Azerbaijan =

Bahlul / Pahlul Bəhlul / Փահլուլ
- Location within Azerbaijan
- Coordinates: 39°49′N 46°44′E
- Country: Azerbaijan
- City: Stepanakert (Khankendi)
- Time zone: UTC+4

Bahlul (Azerbaijani: Bəhlul) or Pahlul (Armenian: Փահլուլ) is a village near the city of Stepanakert in Azerbaijan.

== History ==
In June 1919, the village and the neighboring villages of Ghaibalishen (Khaibalikend), Jamilli, and Karkijahan were looted and destroyed in the Khaibalikend massacre with 600-700 ethnic Armenians being killed by armed Kurdish irregulars and Azerbaijani soldiers.
