= Yuxarı Quşçular =

Yukhary Gushchular
- Azerbaijani: Yuxarı Quşçular
- Location within Azerbaijan
- Coordinates: 39°50′N 46°49′E
- Country: Azerbaijan
- District: Khojaly
- Time zone: UTC+4 (AZT)

Yuxarı Quşçular (Yukhary Gushchular) is a village in the Khojaly District of Azerbaijan. It is the center of the Gushchular rural administrative-territorial district.

== Geography ==
The village of Yukhary-Gushchular is the center of Gushchular rural administrative-territorial district of Khojaly district, while the village of Ashaghy-Gushchular is also part of this rural administrative-territorial district.

The village is located at an altitude of 794 m on the bank of the Gargarchay River near the village of Malibeyli, 15 km north of the city of Shusha and 4 km from the city of Khankendi. Before being transferred to Khojaly district, it had an exclave position: just like the villages of Malibeyli and Ashaghy-Gushchular, it was considered a village of Shusha district, although geographically it was almost inside the Khojaly district.

== History ==
During the Karabakh conflict, the village was occupied by Armenian Armed Forces on 11–12 February 1992. The village suffered greatly from the war in Karabakh and was burned by the Armenian Armed Forces.

According to the Trilateral Statement signed on the night of 9–10 November 2020, following the results of the Second Karabakh War, the village came under the control of the Russian Peacekeeping Forces.

As a result of the military operations carried out by the Armed Forces of Azerbaijan in Karabakh on 19–20 September 2023, the village was returned under the control of Azerbaijan.

By the Law of the Republic of Azerbaijan dated with 5 December 2023, the village of Malibeyli of the Malibeyli rural administrative-territorial district, the villages of Yukhary-Gushchular and Ashaghy-Gushchular of the Gushchular rural administrative-territorial district, together with the Malibeyli and Gushchular rural administrative-territorial districts from Shusha district were transferred to Khojaly district. Thus, at present, the village of Yukhary-Gushchular is the center of the Gushchular rural administrative-territorial district of Khojaly district.

== Population ==
Before the occupation of the village by the Armenian troops, the village had an exclusively Azerbaijani population. According to the 1921 census, 239 people lived in the village of Gushchular (Ashaghy-Gushchular, Yukhary-Gushchular) – all Azerbaijani Turks. According to the Azerbaijan Soviet Encyclopedia of 1986, 280 people lived in the village – all Azerbaijanis.
