= Jamilli =

Jamilli Cəmilli Ջամիլլի
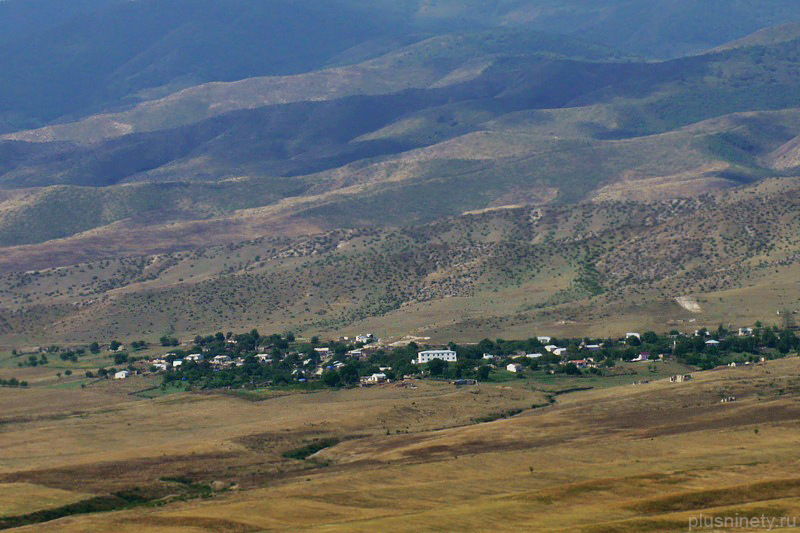

- Location within Azerbaijan Location within Karabakh Economic Region
- Coordinates: 39°50′22″N 46°43′18″E
- Country: Azerbaijan
  - District: Khojaly
- Elevation: 843 m (2,766 ft)
- Time zone: UTC+4 (AZT)

Jamilli (Armenian: Ջամիլլի; Azerbaijani: Cəmilli) is a village in the Khojaly District of Azerbaijan. The village had an Azerbaijani majority prior to their expulsion during the First Nagorno-Karabakh War. Prior to the 2023 Azerbaijani offensive, it was de facto controlled by the Republic of Artsakh.

== History ==
In June 1919, Jamilli and the neighboring villages of Ghaibalishen (Khaibalikend), Karkijahan and Pahlul were looted and burnt as part of the Khaibalikend massacre by armed Kurdish irregulars and Azerbaijani soldiers, in which a total of 600-700 Armenians were killed.

During the Soviet period, the village was a part of the Askeran District of the Nagorno-Karabakh Autonomous Oblast.

== Demographics ==
According to the 1921 census, the village had a population of 125 people, with the entire population being Armenian. Until the 1960s, the village was populated by Armenians, however, in 1963-1964, under the pretext of building a water pipeline to Stepanakert near the village, the population of the village were moved to the city of Stepanakert where they were provided land. After that, the village was populated by Azerbaijanis. In 1989, Jamilli had a population of 549 people.

The Russian human rights organisation Memorial reported on the forced exodus of the Azerbaijani inhabitants of the village, along with several other Azerbaijani villages in the area, during the First Nagorno-Karabakh War.

== Notable people ==
- Shakir Salakhov — National Hero of Azerbaijan

== Gallery ==
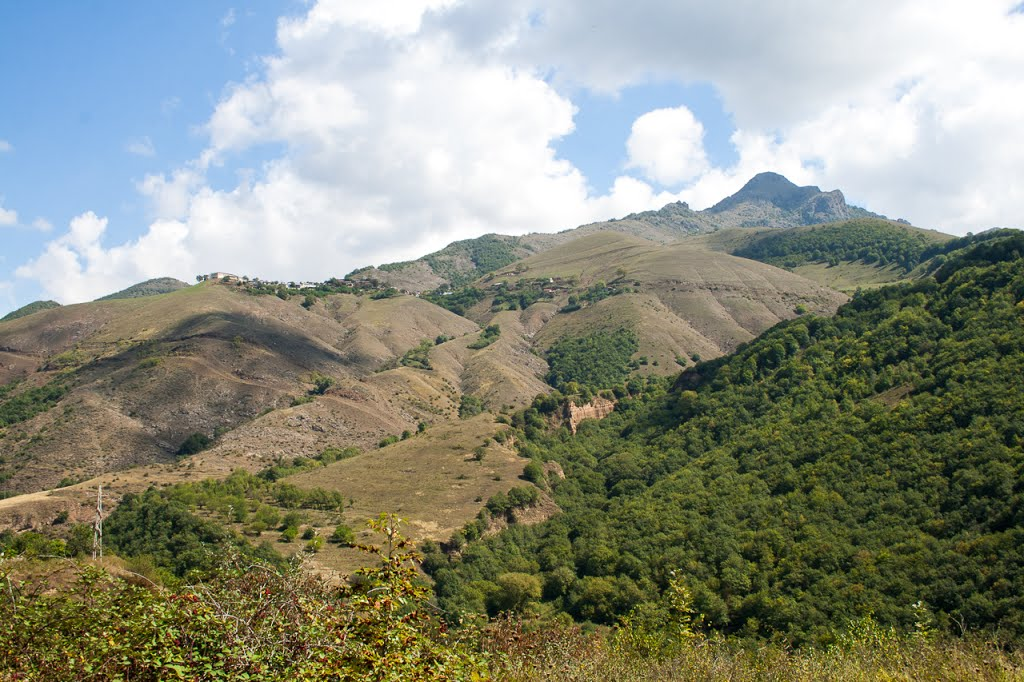

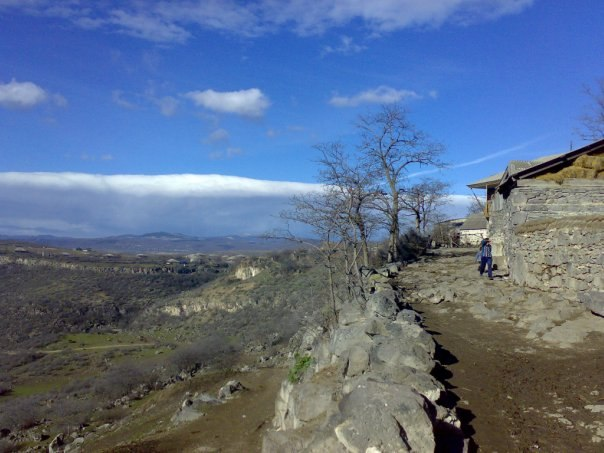
