= Aşağı Quşçular =

Ashaghy Gushchular Azerbaijani: Aşağı Quşçular
- Location within Azerbaijan
- Coordinates: 39°50′13″N 46°48′31″E
- Country: Azerbaijan
- District: Khojaly
- Time zone: UTC+4 (AZT)

Ashaghy Gushchular (Azerbaijani: Aşağı Quşçular)is a village situated in the Gushchular rural administrative-territorial district of Khojaly District of Azerbaijan.

== Geography ==
The village of Ashaghy-Gushchular is part of the Gushchular rural administrative-territorial district of the Khojaly district. This rural administrative-territorial district also includes the village of Yukhary-Gushchular, which is the center of this rural administrative-territorial district.

The village is located at an altitude of 792 m on the bank of the Gargarchay River near the village of Malibeyli, 15 km north of the city of Shusha and 4 km from the city of Khankendi. Before being transferred to Khojaly district, it had an exclave position: just like the villages of Malibeyli and Yukhary-Gushchular, it was considered a village of Shusha district, although geographically it was almost inside the Khojaly district.

== History ==
During the Soviet period, in 1977, the village was part of the Malibeyli village council of Shusha district of Nagorno-Karabakh Autonomous Region (NKAR) of Azerbaijan SSR. By the decision of the Supreme Council of Azerbaijan Republic dated with 7 February 1991 for Shusha district of the NKAR, the village of Yukhary-Gushchular was separated from the Malibeyli village council, Gushchular village council was created with the center in the village of Yukhary- Gushchular, and the village of Ashaghy-Gushchular was transferred from the Malibeyli village council to the Gushchular village council.

According to the Trilateral Statement signed on the night of 9-10 November 2020, following the results of the Second Karabakh War, the village came under the control of the Russian Peacekeeping Forces.

During the September clashes of 2023, the village returned under the control of Azerbaijan.

By the Law of the Republic of Azerbaijan dated with 5 December 2023 Malibeyli village of Malibeyli rural administrative-territorial district, the villages of Yukhari-Gushchular and Ashaghy-Gushchular of the Gushchular rural administrative-territorial district, together with the Malibeyli and Gushchular rural administrative-territorial districts from the Shusha district were transferred to Khojaly district. Thus, at present, the village of Ashaghy-Gushchular is part of the Gushchular rural administrative-territorial district of Khojaly district.

== Population ==
According to the 1921 census, 239 people lived in the village of Gushchular (Ashaghy-Kushchular, Yukhary-Kushchular) - all Azerbaijani Turks (Azerbaijanis). According to the Azerbaijan Soviet Encyclopedia, in 1986, 247 people lived in the village - all Azerbaijanis. The village had an Azerbaijani-majority population before the First Nagorno-Karabakh War. During the capture of village the Azerbaijani population was expelled, it was reported 8 civilians were killed.
