= Ghaibalishen, Nagorno-Karabakh =

Village in Shusha, Azerbaijan

Ghaibalishen / Qaybali Ղայբալիշեն / Qaybalı
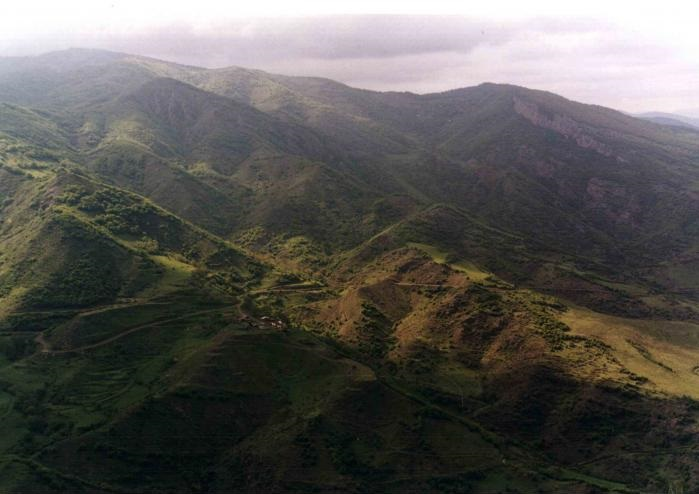

- Location within Azerbaijan
- Coordinates: 39°46′35″N 46°43′40″E
- Country: Azerbaijan
  - District: Shusha
- Time zone: UTC+4 (AZT)

Ghaibalishen (Armenian: Ղայբալիշեն) or Qaybali (Azerbaijani: Qaybalı; Armenian: Ղայբալու, romanized: Ghaybalu) is a village that is part of the Shusha District of Azerbaijan, in the region of Nagorno-Karabakh. Until 2024, the village was controlled by the Republic of Artsakh.

== Toponymy ==
The village is also known as Khaibalikend (Russian: Кайбаликенд).

== History ==
According to the 1897 census, 381 Armenians and 133 Azerbaijanis lived in the village.

In June 1919, 600-700 Armenian inhabitants of Ghaibalishen and the neighboring villages of Jamilli, Karkijahan and Pahlul were massacred by armed Kurdish irregulars and Azerbaijani soldiers. Ghaibalishen was looted and burnt.

The village had an Azerbaijani-majority population prior to the First Nagorno-Karabakh War.
