= Maragha, Azerbaijan =

Maragha / Shikharkh Մարաղա / Şıxarx
- Location within Azerbaijan
- Coordinates: 40°19′48″N 46°52′48″E
- Country: Azerbaijan
- District: Aghdara
- Elevation: 15 m (49 ft)
- Time zone: UTC+4 (AZT)

Maragha (Armenian: Մարաղա; Azerbaijani: Marağa, also Maraga) or Shikharkh (Azerbaijani: Şıxarx), formerly known as Leninavan (between 1954–1992), is a town in the Aghdara District of Azerbaijan, in the disputed region of Nagorno-Karabakh. The town had an ethnic Armenian-majority population in 1989, which had the status of a village at the time. The town was the site of a large massacre of ethnic Armenians by Azerbaijani forces during the First Nagorno-Karabakh War.

== History ==
During the Soviet period, the village was a part of the Mardakert District of the Nagorno-Karabakh Autonomous Oblast.

=== First Nagorno-Karabakh War ===
On 10 April 1992, during the First Nagorno-Karabakh War, the village, known as Leninavan by then, was the scene of a massacre of ethnic Armenians by Azerbaijani forces, which has been described as an act of revenge after the Khojaly Massacre.

== Population ==
| Year | Armenians | | Azerbaijanis | | Russians | | Ukrainians | | Total |
|---|---|---|---|---|---|---|---|---|---|
| 1970 | 3,712 | 95.1% | 109 | 2.8% | 64 | 1.6% | 7 | 0.2% | 3,905 |
| 1979 | 3,740 | 93.5% | 172 | 4.3% | 67 | 1.7% | 7 | 0.2% | 3,998 |
April 1992: Seizure by Azerbaijan. Massacre and Expulsion of Armenian population.
