= Khaibalikend massacre =

1919 mass killing of Armenian civilians

- Location: Nagorno-Karabakh
- Date: June 5–7, 1919
- Target: Armenian civilians
- Attack type: Massacre, pogrom
- Deaths: 600–700

The Khaibalikend massacre was the mass killing of Armenian civilians in the villages of Ghaibalishen (Khaibalikend), Jamilli, and Karkijahan and Pahlul in Nagorno-Karabakh, from June 5 to 7, 1919. The villages were destroyed, and from 600 to 700 ethnic Armenians, including women and children, were murdered by armed ethnic Azeri and Kurdish irregulars and Azerbaijani soldiers. The massacre was organized by Nagorno-Karabakh's Governor-General Khosrov bek Sultanov and led by his brother, Sultan bek Sultanov.

== Background ==
In January 1919, the commander of British forces in the Caspian General William M. Thomson approved Khosrov bek Sultanov's appointment by the Baku government as provisional governor-general of Karabakh and Zangezur (control over Zangezur was ultimately never established), pending a final decision at the Paris Peace Conference. Sultanov was an Azerbaijani of Kurdish origin known for his anti-Armenian views, and this decision was strenuously opposed by the Armenian population of Karabakh, led by the Karabakh's Armenian Council, which favored Nagorno-Karabakh's unification with the newly established Republic of Armenia. There was also opposition voiced by the Armenian government, as well as a number of American diplomats and relief officials working in the region, who cited Sultanov's past collaboration with the Ottoman armies that had occupied the area in 1918.

On June 4–5, 1919, an armed Armenian–Azerbaijani clash took place in Shusha, which was organized and incited by Sultanov. The Armenian part of the town was blockaded, and its Armenian population found itself in acute need of food and drinking water. Meanwhile, the Russian military barracks in Khankendi (nowadays Stepanakert) were occupied by Azerbaijani armed forces that had arrived from Baku and Ganca.

== The massacre ==
Despite the harsh measures, Sultanov's attempts to subordinate Karabakh to Azerbaijan proved to be unsuccessful. The Armenian National Council of Karabakh remained resolute. As tensions rose, the condition of Armenian inhabitants of villages located near the Khankendi barracks was worsening. It was at that time when on June 5, 1919, Tatar (i.e. Azerbaijani) armed gangs under the command of Pasha bek Sultanov entered the Khaibalikend, Pahlul and Karkijahan villages. About 700 people, mostly innocent civilians, were murdered in Khaibalikend alone. The three settlements were burned and dead bodies dumped into water wells. Though Sultanov denied any wrongdoing, an investigation carried out by the British military concluded that he had instigated the massacres to take place.

== After the massacre ==
Later in 1919, Sultanov bolstered the size of the garrisons at Khankendi and continued to move his troops around, once more without the required consent of his administrative council. Ethnic tension in Karabakh heightened once more, as Azerbaijani troops lynched and killed several Armenians in Khankendi and pillaged the surrounding areas in February of that year. In early March, after a delegation of Karabakh Armenians met in the village of Shosh and rejected the possibility of union with Azerbaijan, Sultanov sought to tighten his control of Karabakh: he forbade Armenians from leaving Shusha without permission, stationed Azerbaijani troops in Armenian homes, ordered Armenian veterans of the former Russian Army to register so that they may not partake in military activities, and drew up plans to destroy several Armenian villages to sever the link between Armenians in Karabakh and the region of Zangezur.

The Khaibalikend Massacre proved to be a prelude to a much larger tragedy in Nagorno–Karabakh – the Shusha pogrom in March 1920, in which the Tatar ("Azerbaijani") armed militants almost destroyed the Armenian half of the regional capital of Shusha.

According to Christopher J. Walker, in Armenia and Karabakh, published by Minority Rights Group International, "Sites of special significance for modern Armenian history are also being destroyed; the ruins of Khaibalikend, where 600 Armenians were massacred in June 1919 are being demolished, including the church which was being used as a stable."
