= Karkijahan, Nagorno-Karabakh =

Village in Azerbaijan

Krkjan / Karkijahan Քրքջան / Kərkicahan
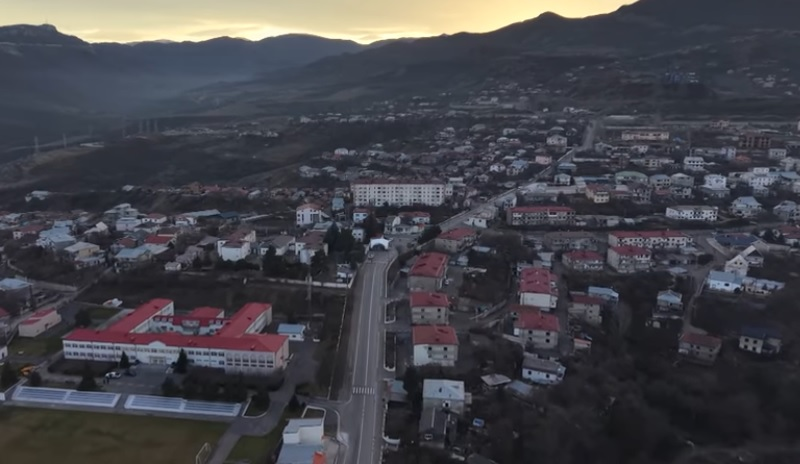

- Location within Azerbaijan
- Coordinates: 39°48′12″N 46°44′16.3″E
- Country: Azerbaijan
  - District: Khankendi
- Elevation: 997 m (3,271 ft)
- Time zone: UTC+4 (AZT)

Krkjan (Armenian: Քրքջան) or Karkijahan (Azerbaijani: Kərkicahan) is a settlement near the city of Stepanakert. The village had an Armenian-majority population prior to the Khaibalikend massacre in 1919 and subsequently an Azerbaijani-majority population prior to the Nagorno-Karabakh conflict in 1988.

== History ==
=== Pre-Soviet period ===
In 1886, the village had an Armenian-majority population, consisting entirely of farmers.

In June 1919, the village and the neighboring villages of Ghaibalishen (Khaibalikend), Jamilli, and Pahlul were looted and destroyed in the Khaibalikend massacre with 600-700 ethnic Armenians being killed by armed Kurdish irregulars and Azerbaijani soldiers.

=== Soviet Union ===
During the early Soviet period, the village was a district within the city of Stepanakert in the Nagorno-Karabakh Autonomous Oblast of the Azerbaijan SSR, known as Karkijan (Azerbaijani: Kərkican). In 1988, the district was given the status of an urban-type settlement, after Azerbaijani IDPs from Stepanakert settled in the village. Tensions steadily grew between Azerbaijanis of Karkijahan and Armenians of Stepanakert. In one incident on 5 May 1989, three locals and four soldiers were wounded. Similar incidents were recorded in July 1989, and November 1991.

=== First Nagorno-Karabakh War ===
The settlement had an Azerbaijani-majority population of 1,796 inhabitants prior to the outbreak of the Nagorno-Karabakh conflict in 1988. Following the expulsion of ethnic Azerbaijanis from the city of Stepanakert in 1988, most of them settled in Karkijahan. Armenian troops entered Karkijahan on 29 December 1991, and established full control over it the following day. By the time of its capture, most of the village's Azerbaijani population had already left the village. According to Azerbaijan, 34 people, including 3 women and 2 minors, were killed during the battles. During the hostilities in Karkijahan, a journalist of Radio Mayak, Leonid Lazarevich, was killed. Azerbaijani forces recaptured the village by 31 December, however it was finally retaken by Armenian forces in late January - early February 1992. The village was subsequently burned to the ground by Armenian forces.

=== Republic of Artsakh ===
Since the First Nagorno-Karabakh War, the settlement has been administrated as part of the city of Stepanakert by the Republic of Artsakh. It was renamed Krkjan (Armenian: Քրքջան).

=== Population ===
As of December 2025, 30 Azerbaijani families, totaling 115 individuals, have been resettled in the village by Azerbaijan.

== Gallery ==
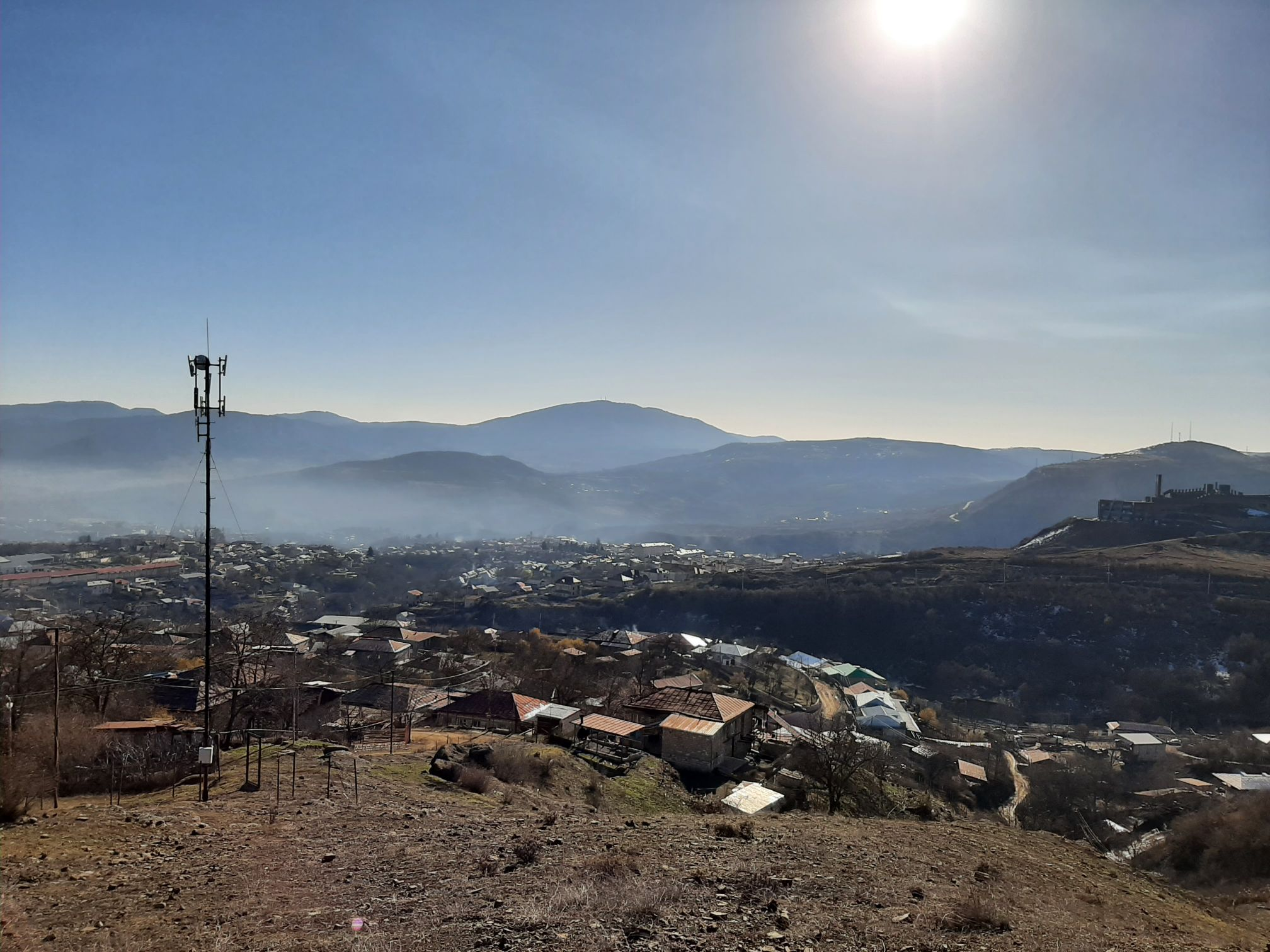
Karkijahan view in the past

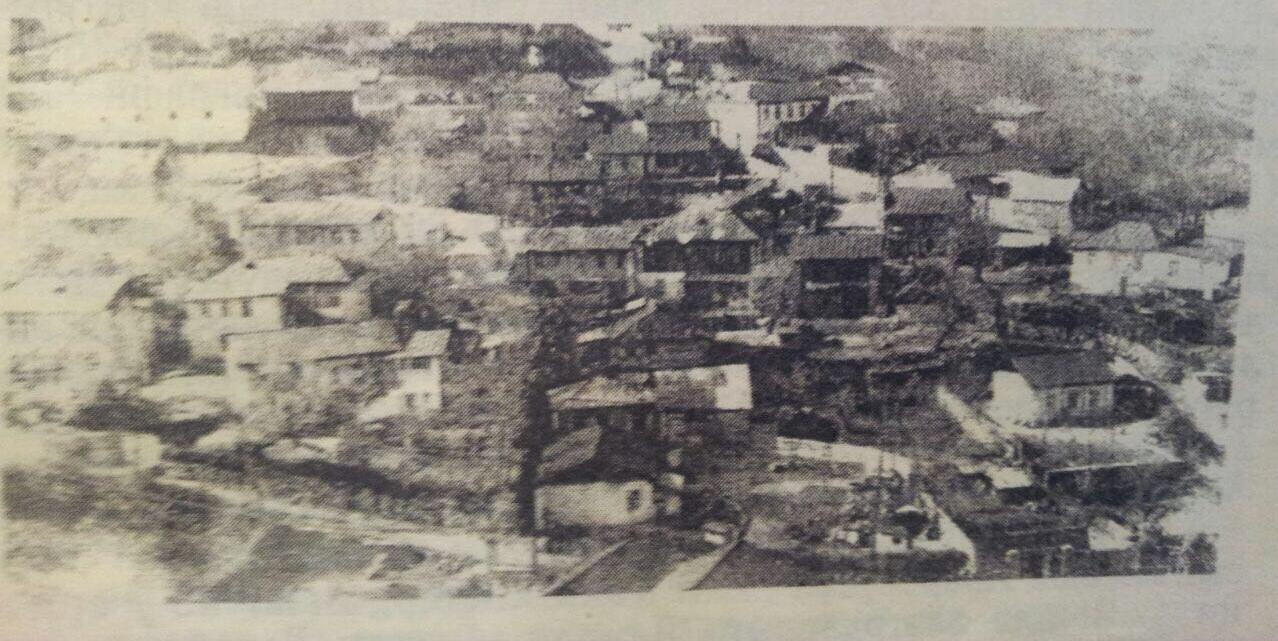
Old image of Karkijahan

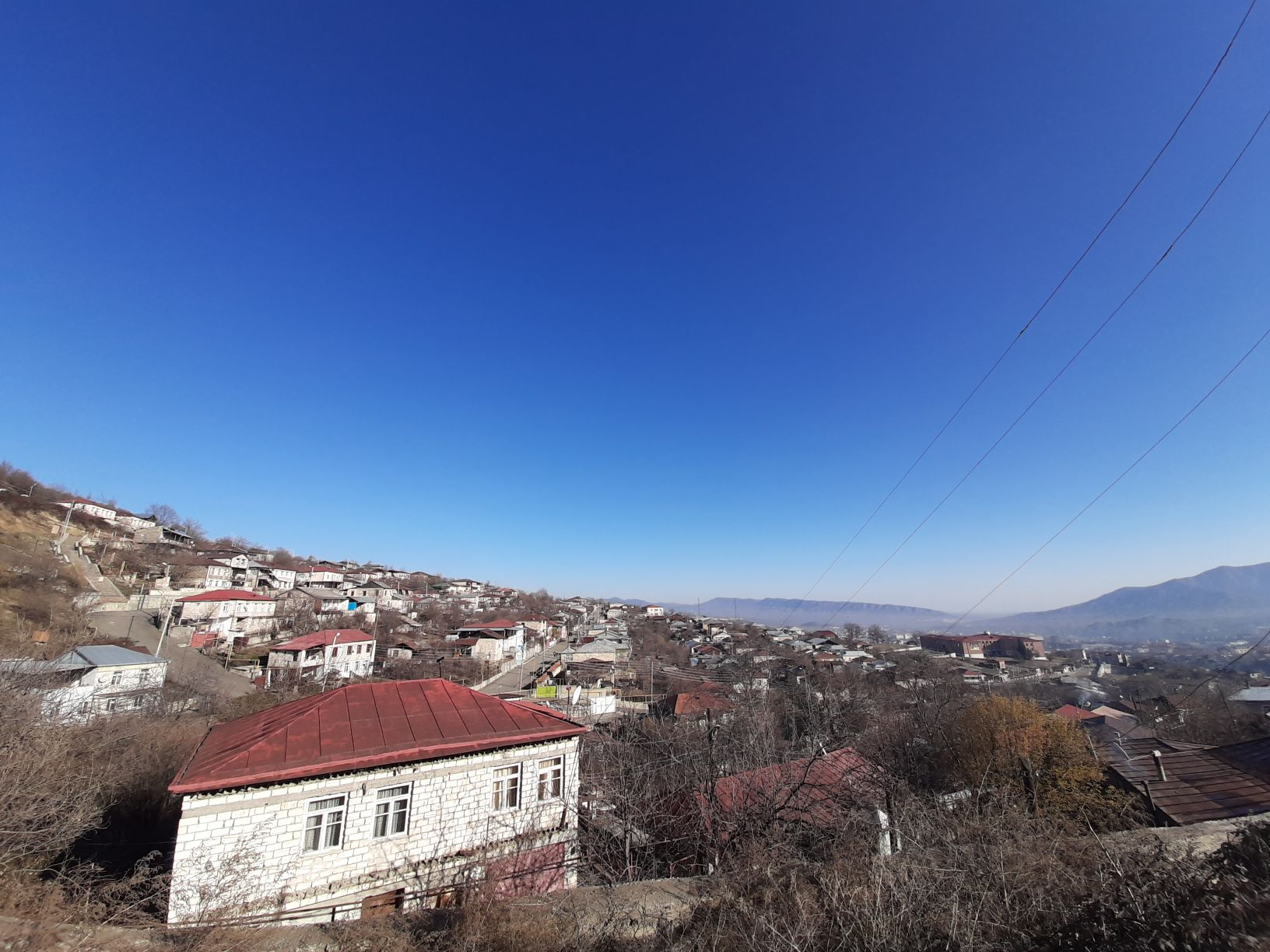
View of Karkijahan

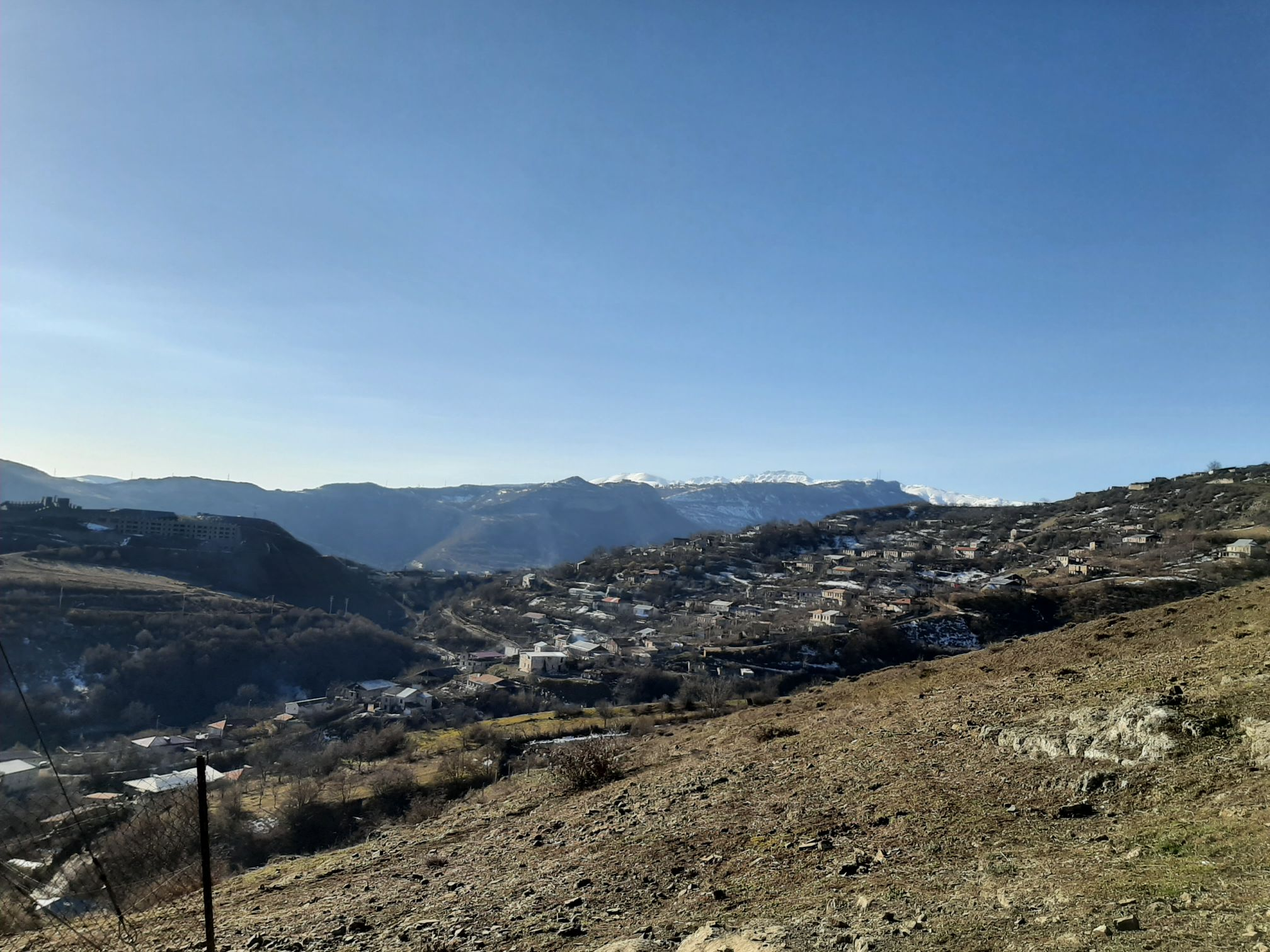
View of Karkijahan
