= Bombardment of Tartar =

Offensive operations targeting the Tartar region of Azerbaijan in 2020

2020 bombardment of Tartar
- Part of the Second Nagorno-Karabakh War
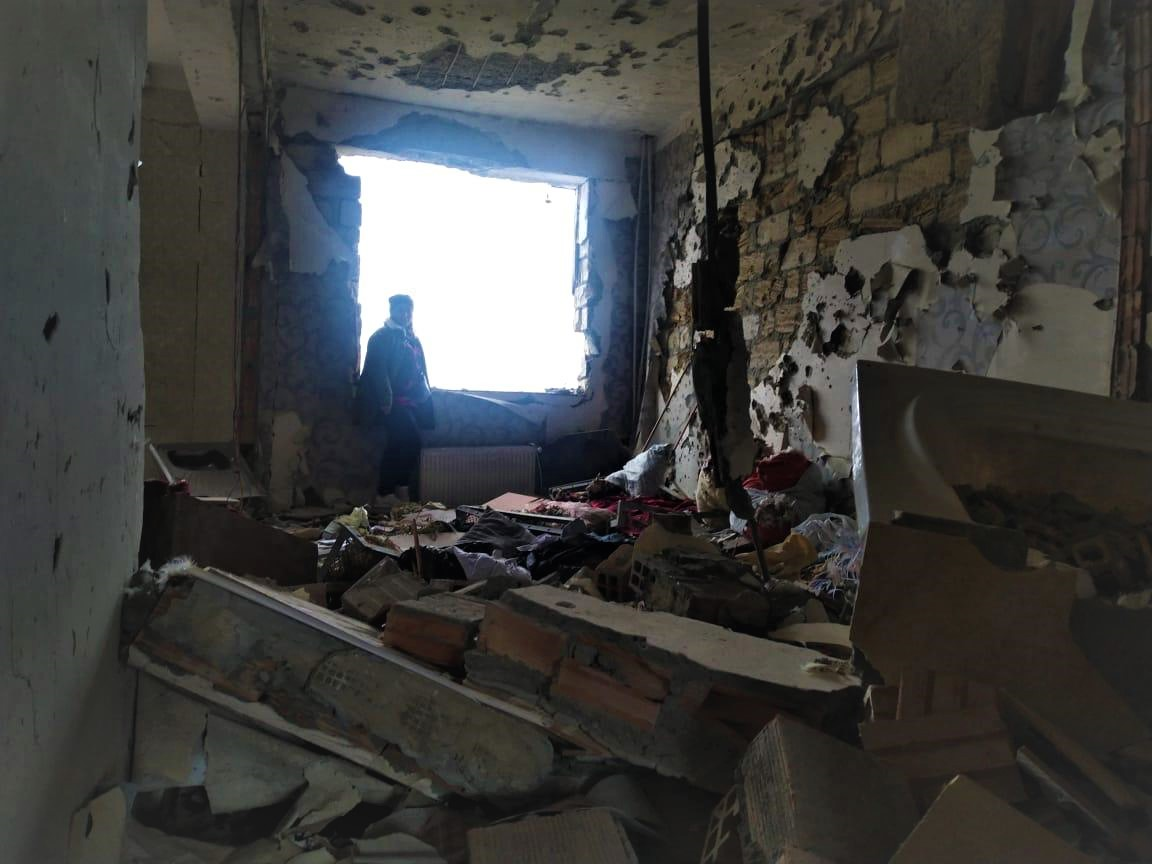
- One of the destroyed apartments in Shikharkh
- Location: Tartar District, Azerbaijan
- Date: 28 September – 10 November 2020 (1 month, 1 week and 6 days) (GMT+4)
- Attack type: Bombardment
- Weapon: Shelling; Missiles; Cluster munitions; White phosphorus (alleged)
- Deaths: 17
- Injuries: 63
- Perpetrator: Armenian Armed Forces; Artsakh Defence Army

The bombardment of Tartar (Azerbaijani: Tərtərin bombalanması) was the bombardment of the cities, towns, and villages in Tartar District of Azerbaijan by the Armenian Armed Forces and the Artsakh Defence Army with artillery, missiles, and cluster munitions during the Second Nagorno-Karabakh War. The bombardment of the district started on the second day of the war, on 28 September, when the Armenian forces shelled the city of Tartar, the administrative center of the district, and Shikharkh, which was built for the Azerbaijani refugees of the First Nagorno-Karabakh War.

Parts of the city of Tartar and around had a sizable military presence from Azerbaijan. Throughout the war, the city was frequently shelled by Armenian forces. The bombardment caused widespread destruction and many civilian deaths. Thousands of people became refugees, making the city of Tartar a ghost town, and fled to neighboring cities, such as Barda, which was also targeted by the Armenian forces with cluster missiles. The Azerbaijani authorities stated that the Armenian forces had fired 15,500 shells on the territory of Tartar District until 29 October, with over 2,000 shells being fired upon Tartar in some days. Official Azerbaijani figures list over a thousand civilian objects, including schools, hospitals, and government buildings that were either damaged or destroyed during the bombardment.

Human Rights Watch confirmed many of the targeted attacks on civilians and civilian objects, such as kindergartens and hospitals, by the Armenian forces. It also stated that the Armenian military forces had carried out indiscriminate rocket and missile strikes on the Azerbaijani territories, and that such indiscriminate attacks were war crimes. Ilham Aliyev accused Armenia of "trying to turn Tartar to the next Aghdam." Turkey also condemned the Armenian shelling of a cemetery in Tartar during a funeral ceremony, which foreign journalists at scene and Human Rights Watch confirmed.

The bombardment of the city of Tartar, as well as Azerbaijani towns and villages in the district of same name stopped on 10 November, when Armenia signed a ceasefire agreement with Azerbaijan with Russia's mediation, ending all hostilities in the region.

== Background ==
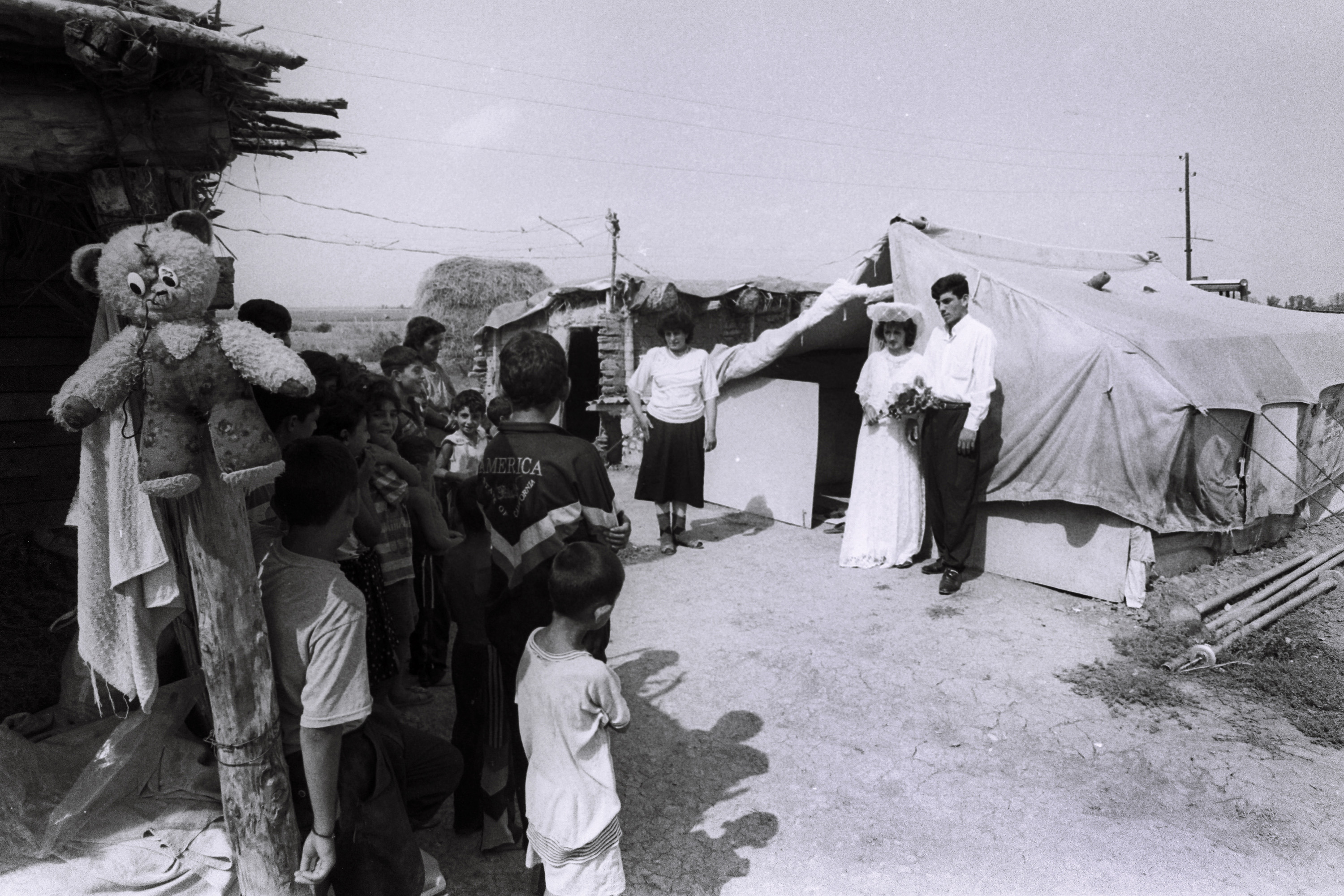
Wedding of the Azerbaijani refugees settled in Tartar in 1996.

Tartar is a district of Azerbaijan, consisting of the former Tartar Rayon and a part of former Mardakert District of the former Nagorno-Karabakh Autonomous Oblast. Since the First Nagorno-Karabakh War, most of it has been under the control of the breakaway Republic of Artsakh, governed as part of its Martakert Province. IDPs from Nagorno-Karabakh and the surrounding occupied territories were moved to the district from tent settlements around the country to live in new houses built by the government. Tartar District was home to a population of 105 thousand people in early 2020, with its administrative center, the city of Tartar, being about 90 kilometres (56 mi) far from Nagorno-Karabakh.

The disputed region of Nagorno-Karabakh, with its ethnic Armenian majority, is a de jure part of Azerbaijan, but is de facto held by the breakaway Republic of Artsakh, which is supported by Armenia. Ethnic violence began in the late 1980s, and exploded into a war following the dissolution of the USSR in 1991. On 20 February 1988, the Soviet of the Nagorno-Karabakh Autonomous Oblast passed a resolution requesting transfer of the oblast from the Azerbaijan SSR to the Armenia SSR; Azerbaijan rejected the request. Following the revoking of Nagorno-Karabakh's autonomous status, an independence referendum was held on 10 December 1991 which was boycotted by the Azerbaijani population which then constituted around 22.8% of Nagorno-Karabakh's population; as a result, 99.8% voted in favor. Both Armenia and Azerbaijan then became independent of the Soviet Union as the results of referendums in 1991 and their independence were internationally recognized in 1992.

The First Nagorno-Karabakh War resulted in the displacement of 750,000 Azerbaijanis overall, with roughly 600,000 of them being from Nagorno-Karabakh and the seven surrounding districts, which were majority-Azeri, essentially cleansing all of the occupied territories from its Azerbaijani inhabitants. Similarly, 353,000 Armenians had to flee from Azerbaijan. The war ended with a ceasefire in 1994, with the unrecognised Republic of Artsakh in control of most of the Nagorno-Karabakh region, as well as occupying the surrounding districts of Agdam, Jabrayil, Fuzuli, Kalbajar, Qubadli, Lachin and Zangilan of Azerbaijan and the Lachin Corridor – a mountain pass that links Nagorno-Karabakh with mainland Armenia.

For three decades multiple violations of the ceasefire occurred, the most serious being the four-day 2016 Nagorno-Karabakh conflict. Surveys indicated that the inhabitants of Nagorno-Karabakh did not want to be part of Azerbaijan, and in August 2019, in a declaration in favour of unification, the Armenian prime minister Nikol Pashinyan stated "Artsakh is Armenia, full stop". Further skirmishes occurred on the border between Armenia and Azerbaijan in July 2020.

On 27 September 2020, clashes broke out in the Nagorno-Karabakh region, which was mostly de facto controlled by Artsakh, but de jure a part of Azerbaijan, which soon escalated to a war.

== Bombardment ==
=== September ===
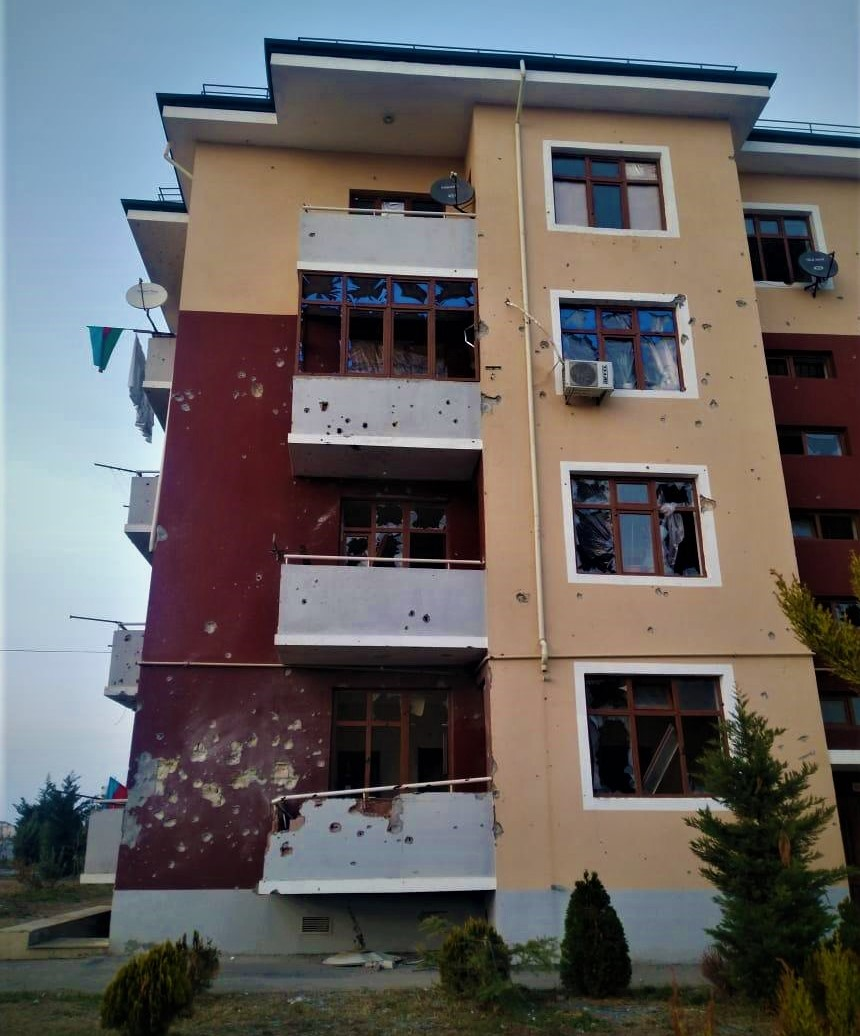
The Armenian bombardment also heavily damaged the town of Shikharkh, which was built for the Azerbaijani refugees of the First Nagorno-Karabakh War.

On 28 September, the Prosecutor General's Office of Azerbaijan stated that the Armenian forces shelled the city of Tartar at about 11:00. The Presidential Administration of Azerbaijan also stated that following the Armenian shelling, a textile shop in Tartar District was damaged. Moreover, according to the Azerbaijani authorities, a police department in the city of Tartar and Shikharkh, a town created for the Azerbaijani refugees of the First Nagorno-Karabakh War, were also shelled. In response, the Azerbaijani Ministry of Defence (MoD) stated that it gave the "last warning to Armenia that adequate retaliatory measures will be taken against them if needed". At about 19:00, the Armenian shelling in Shikharkh, hitting the yard of an apartment building, killed two civilians and injured two more. The Human Rights Watch confirmed the attack on 8 November, and visited the area to observe damage consistent with artillery shelling.

On 30 September, the Prosecutor General's Office of Azerbaijan stated that the Armenian forces had heavily shelled the city of Tartar at about 08:00 in the morning. According to the Azerbaijani authorities, an artillery projectile exploded near the government buildings, injuring seven civilians.

=== October ===
On 1 October, the Azerbaijani MoD stated that starting from the morning, the Armenian forces shelled the city of Tartar. The Prosecutor General's Office of Azerbaijan also stated that at about 09:00, the Armenian shelling killed a civilian in the city and badly damaged the train station there. The Ministry of Education of Azerbaijan then stated that the Armenian shelling wounded a teacher from a secondary school in Seydimli, and that six schools were destroyed in the district since 27 September.

The following day, the Azerbaijani MoD stated that the Armenian forces were heavily shelling the city of Tartar and Shikharkh. The same ministry also stated that the Armenian shelling had damaged a kindergarten in Shikharkh, which was confirmed by the Human Rights Watch. On 4 October, the Azerbaijani MoD stated that the Armenian forces had rocketed Tartar District, wounding civilians. The next day, the Azerbaijani MoD stated that the Armenian forces had shelled the city of Tartar starting from the morning. On 7 October, the Azerbaijani MoD stated that the Armenian shelling of Tartar was continuing. The following day, the Presidential Administration of Azerbaijan stated that the Armenian forces had rocketed the city of Tartar with BM-21 Grad missile launchers, accusing the Armenian military leadership of "targeting civilians with precision-guided missiles." On 9-10 and 12 October, the Azerbaijani MoD stated that the Armenian forces were shelling Tartar District at noon. while the Prosecutor General's Office of Azerbaijan stated that the shelling had injured a civilian on the 10th and another during the shelling of Kangarli on the 12th.

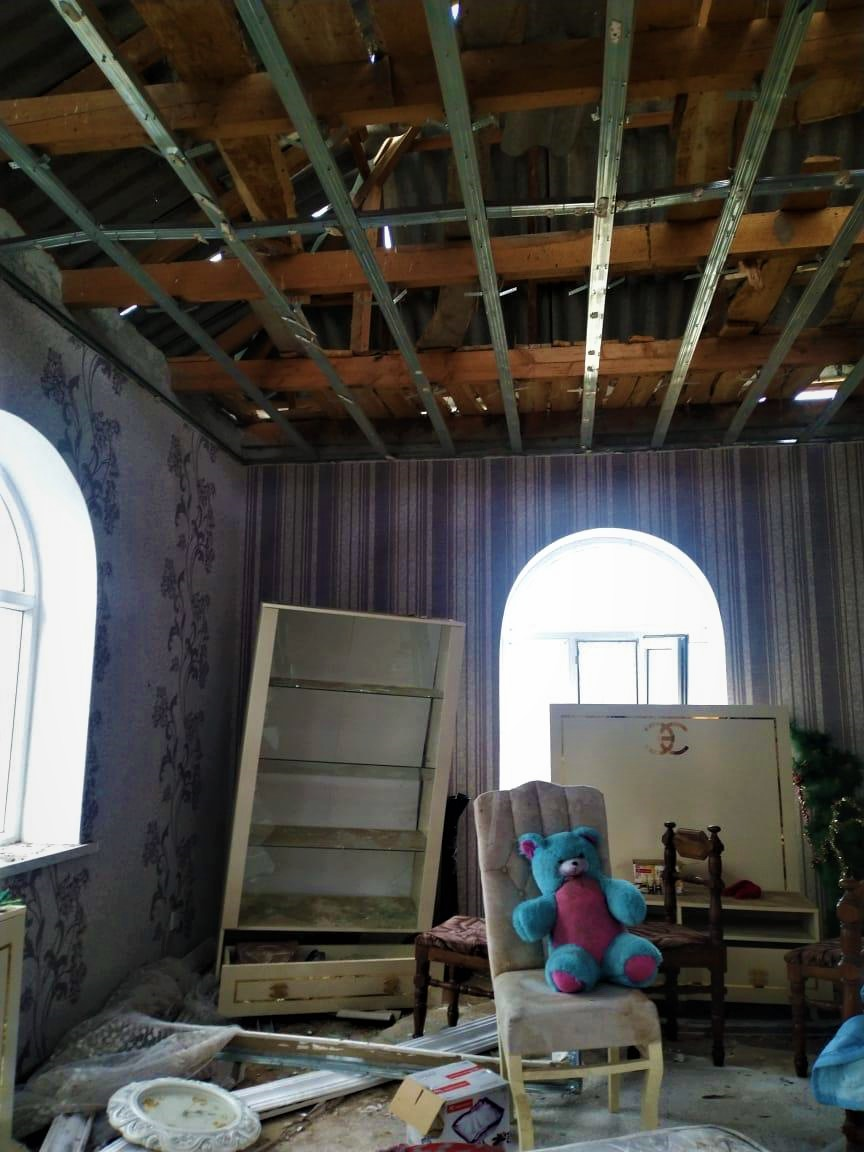
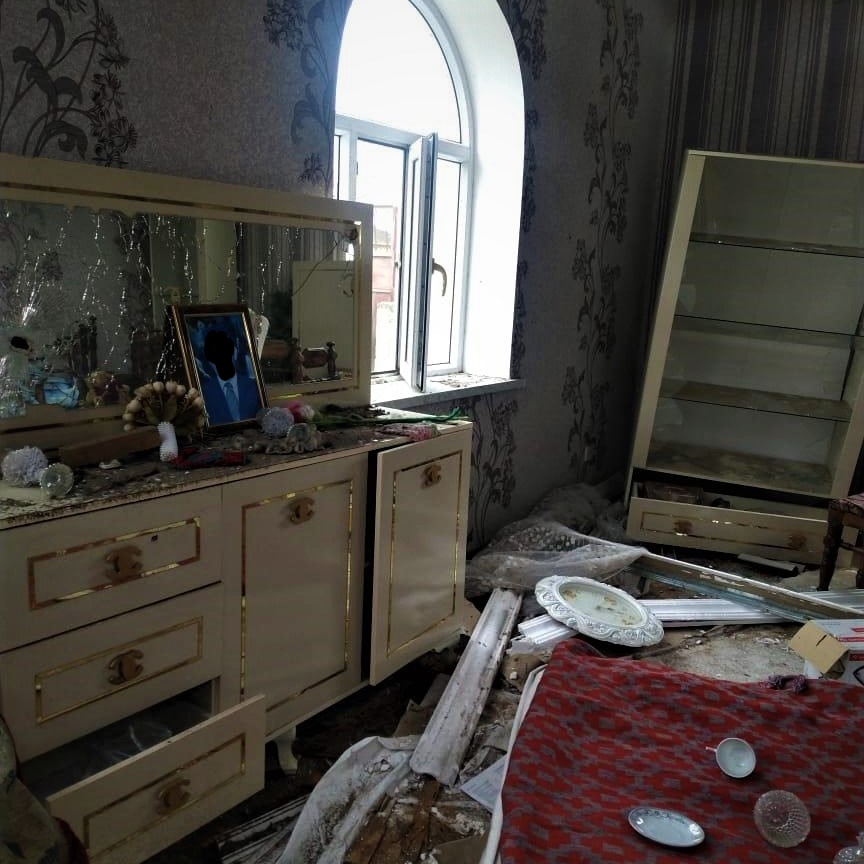
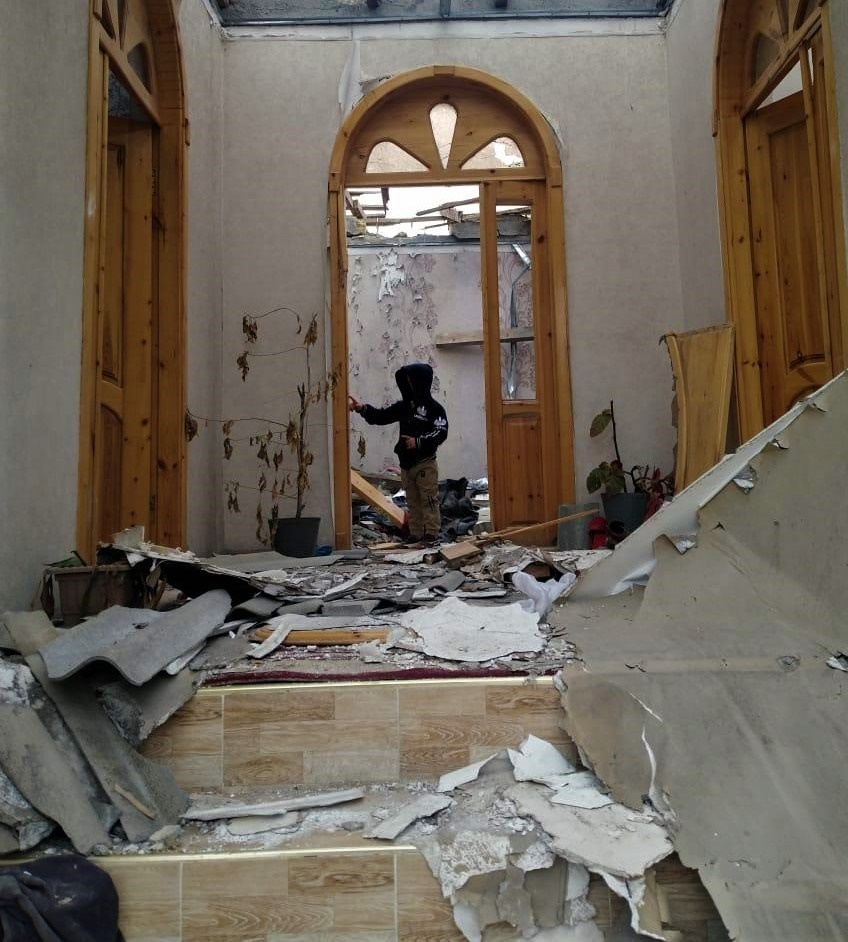
Apart from the city of Tartar, the Armenian bombardment had also heavily damaged residential houses in the nearby villages.

The following day, the Azerbaijani MoD stated that the Armenian forces were shelling Tartar District starting from the morning. On 14 October, local Azerbaijani journalists reported that the Armenian forces had shelled Duyarly, with one of the artiller shells completely destroying a shopping center, and another damaging a secondary school. Prosecutor General's Office of Azerbaijan then stated that in Duyarly, one government official was wounded, while in Asgarli, another government official was wounded, alongside 5 other civilians. Also, according to the Azerbaijani authorities, a journalist working for the AzTV was wounded during the shelling.

On 15 October, the Armenian forces shelled a cemetery 400 metres (1,300 ft) north of the city of Tartar during a funeral ceremony, killing 4 civilians and injuring 4 more. This was confirmed by local journalists, TV Rain, and the Human Rights Watch. The Presidential Administration of Azerbaijan also confirmed that the cemetery was shelled in the morning.

On 18 October, local Azerbaijani journalists reported that the Armenian shelling in the city of Tartar severely damaged a secondary school. The following day, local Azerbaijani journalists reported that the Armenian shelling continued, injuring a civilian in Alasgarli. On 20 October, Prosecutor General's Office of Azerbaijan stated that the Armenian forces were shelling Tartar District starting from the morning, and that at about 15:00, the Armenian shelling in Jamilli killed two civilians, wounding another. The Azerbaijani MoD then stated that the Armenian forces had rocketed and shelled Tartar District in the afternoon. The next day, the Azerbaijani MoD stated that the Armenian forces had shelled the settlements in the Tartar District starting from the morning. On 23 October, the Azerbaijani MoD stated that the Armenian forces had shelled the settlements in the Tartar District in the morning. According to the Human Rights Watch, the satellite imagery recorded on that day showed substantial damage and cratering from shelling throughout the city of Tartar. Also, hundreds of craters consistent with heavy artillery shelling were concentrated in Shikharkh.

The following day, the Azerbaijani MoD stated that the Armenian forces had rocketed and shelled the settlements in the Tartar District in the morning. Then, the Presidential Administration of Azerbaijan stated that the Armenian forces had fired a BM-30 Smerch missiles on the city of Tartar, killing a 16-year-old boy. This was confirmed by Human Rights Watch. According to HRW, the Armenian forces had launched a cluster munition attack on Khoruzlu, a village of 290 people in the district, killing the 16-year-old boy. HRW also reported that it did not see any military installations or transport in the vicinity of the site. On 25 October, the Azerbaijani MoD stated that the Armenian forces were shelling the settlements in the Tartar District at noon. The same ministry yet again stated that the Armenian forces were shelling the settlements in the Tartar District next day, while the Presidential Administration of Azerbaijan stated that the Armenian shelling was accompanied by missiles, which continued in the afternoon. The Azerbaijani MoD then stated that the Armenian forces had rocketed the city of Tartar by using BM-30 Smerch multiple rocket launchers, adding that the Azerbaijani air defence units had neutralized one of the missiles launched on the city. On 27 and 28 October, the Azerbaijani MoD stated that the shelling of Tartar District continued. At afternoon, according to the Azerbaijani authorities, the Armenian forces had shelled the settlements in the Tartar District. Also, according to the Azerbaijani MoD, the Armenian forces had rocketed the city of Tartar and villages of the Tartar district from the BM-30 Smerch multiple-launch missile system on 28 October. There are no casualties. The Azerbaijani authorities then stated that the Armenian forces again shelled Tartar District, and then rocketed it with BM-21 Grad multiple rocket launchers and howitzers.

On 29 October, Head of the Foreign Policy Department of the Azerbaijani Presidential Administration, Hikmet Hajiyev, visited Tartar together with representatives of media and diplomatic corps. During the visit, the Azerbaijani authorities stated that the Armenian forces continued to shell the city, and Hajiyev stated that the Armenian leadership has "become so insolent, that its armed forces shelled Tartar even when diplomats were there." According to the Azerbaijani MoD, the shelling continued in the afternoon.

The following day, the Presidential Administration of Azerbaijan released a photo, showing an unexploded Smerch missile, apparently in Alasgarli. On 31 October, the Azerbaijani MoD stated that the Armenian shelling of Tartar District restarted in the morning.

=== November ===
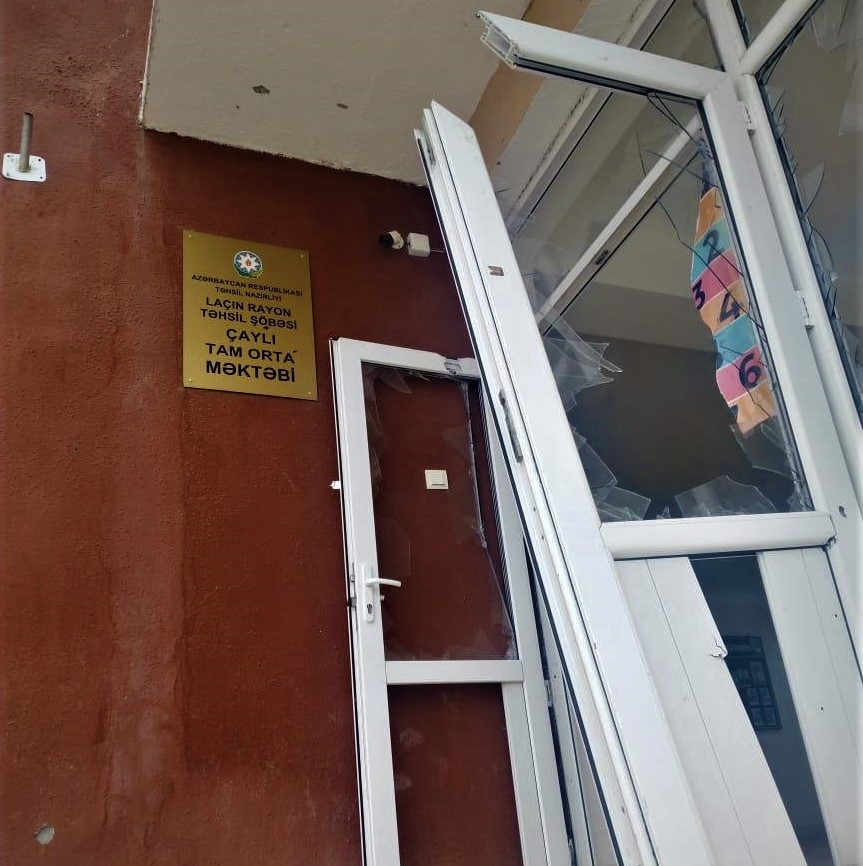
The Azerbaijani authorities had stated that apart from residential buildings and apartments, schools and hospitals were also targeted by the Armenian forces.

On 1 November, the Azerbaijani MoD stated that the Armenian forces had shelled the city of Tartar, as well as Shikharkh. The next day, the same ministry stated that heavy Armenian shelling continued in Shikharkh, Gazyan and Gapanli. On 3 November, local Azerbaijani journalists reported that the Armenian forces had shelled another cemetery, this time in Sahlabad. According to a Trend News Agency correspondent at scene, the shelling completely destroyed 65 graves, and another 100 were damaged.

On the same day, Azerbaijan National Agency for Mine Action (ANAMA) found unexploded white phosphorus munitions in Sahlabad, which, according to Azerbaijan, was fired by the Armenian forces. Azerbaijani authorities had also stated that the Armenian forces were transporting white phosphorus into the region. Later on, Prosecutor General's Office of Azerbaijan filed a lawsuit, accusing the Armenian Armed Forces of using phosphorus ammunition in Nagorno-Karabakh, as well as in Tartar District, and chemical munitions to "inflict large-scale and long-term harm to the environment" in Fuzuli and Tartar Districts, as well as around Shusha.

On 4 November, Azerbaijani MoD stated that the Armenian forces had periodically shelled Huseynli and Gazyan starting from the morning. The same ministry then stated that the Armenian shelling had continued in the city of Tartar, as well as Shikharh at afternoon. The following day, the Azerbaijani MoD stated that the Armenian forces had periodically shelled the settlements of Tartar District, including the city of the same name and Sahlabad. On 7 November, the Azerbaijani MoD stated that the Armenian shelling had continued in Shikharkh, Gazyan and Huseynli. Then, the Prosecutor General's Office of Azerbaijan stated that the Armenian shelling hit a residential house in Aski Para and had wounded its tenant.

The next day, the Azerbaijani MoD stated that the Armenian forces had shelled Tartar District, starting from the morning. According to the Azerbaijani authorities, the shelling continued into the night. On 9 November, local Azerbaijani journalists reported that the Armenian shelling in Aski Para had completely destroyed 20 houses, and seriously damaged 80 more. The next day, Prosecutor General's Office of Azerbaijan stated that a civilian was wounded in the city of Tartar because of the Armenian shelling at around 00:00. continued at 00:20.

== Aftermath ==
Following the capture of Shusha, the second-largest settlement in Nagorno-Karabakh, a ceasefire agreement was signed between the President of Azerbaijan, Ilham Aliyev, the Prime Minister of Armenia, Nikol Pashinyan, and the President of Russia, Vladimir Putin, ending all hostilities in the area from 00:00, 10 November 2020 Moscow Time. Under the agreement, the warring sides will keep control of their currently held areas within Nagorno-Karabakh, while Armenia will return the surrounding territories it occupied in 1994 to Azerbaijan. Azerbaijan will also gain land access to its Nakhchivan exclave bordering Turkey and Iran. Approximately 2,000 Russian soldiers will be deployed as peacekeeping forces along the Lachin corridor between Armenia and Nagorno-Karabakh for a mandate of at least five years.

After the war ended, many of the refugees from Tartar returned to their homes. The residents of the city gathered at the Clock Square to clean and sweep the streets, with local shopkeepers cleaning the debris of their broken windows and reopening their shops.

== Casualties ==
=== Civilian ===
On 29 October, the head of the Tartar District Executive Power, Mustagim Mammadov, stated that during the war, 17 civilians killed, and 61 people injured in Tartar District as a result of the bombardment. According to him, in total, about 1,200 people suffered from the bombardment. The Azerbaijani authorities reported two more civilian injuries later on.

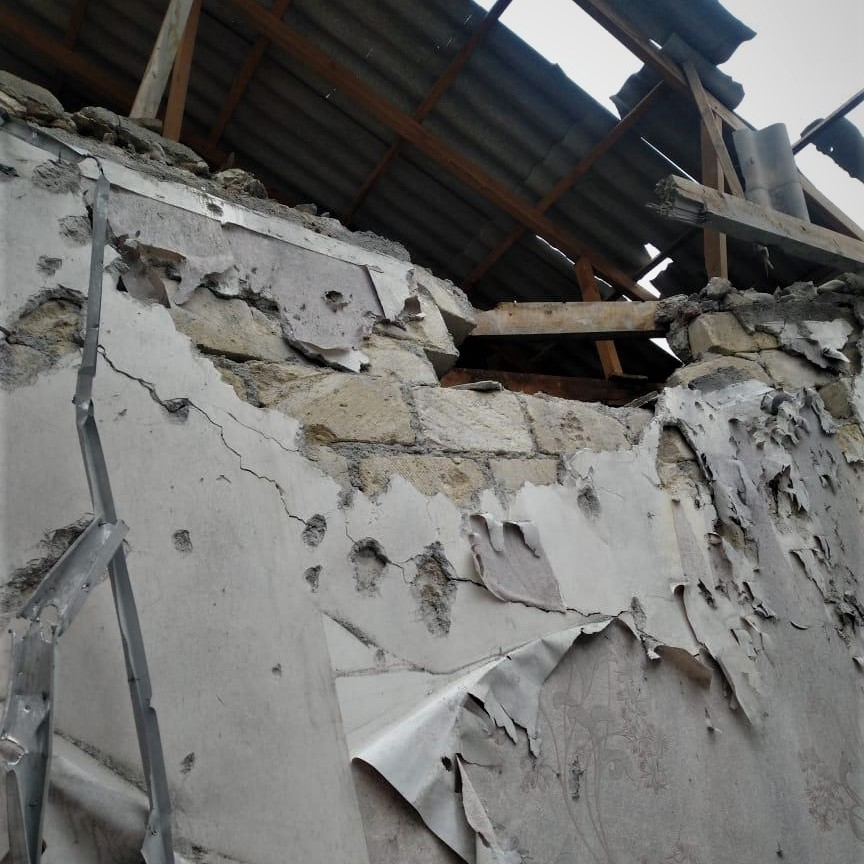
Azerbaijani authorities had stated that about four thousand civilian objects were damaged in the territory of the Tartar District as a result of the bombardment.

As a result of the bombardment, a large chunk of Tartar's Azerbaijani population became displaced, and the city of Tartar, normally home to about 100,000 people, became a ghost town. In Tartar, refugees were sleeping at most of the schools, kindergarten, cafes, restaurants, hospitals, private families and elsewhere, with most of them squeezed into the available space. The Azerbaijani authorities stated that the city was emptied in October as residents sought shelter from the bombardment. Many of the refugees fled to Barda, which is just 20 kilometres (12 mi) to the east, being allowed to stay in Barda's schools for over two months, but the buildings were evacuated after the Armenian cluster missile attacks to the city. Some Tartar residents who stayed in the city sheltered in the basements of their homes.

=== Infrastructure damage ===
In the second day of the war, the Presidential Administration of Azerbaijan stated that over 2,000 shells fell in Tartar District in a single day. On 29 October, the head of the Tartar District Executive Power, Mustagim Mammadov, stated that during the war, the Armenian forces fired 15,500 shells on the territory of the district, with over 2,000 shells being fired upon Tartar in some days. According to him, until 29 October, 133 houses were completely destroyed, and 873 houses, as well as 14 schools, three hospitals, and 18 government buildings were partially damaged. On 5 November, Euronews reported that the city's residential and shopping districts were badly damaged.

The working groups created by the Azerbaijani government in early November started assessing the damage during the war, with three working groups being dispatched to Tartar District as the damage was considered too extensive. On 24 November, the head of the working groups dispatched to Tartar, Gubad Heydarov, stated that 796 damaged properties, including 611 private houses and 147 apartments, had already been inspected, with the survey nearly complete. On 14 January 2021, Heydarov stated that a total of 3,800 facilities were either damaged during the bombardment, while 76 of them were completely in disrepair and cannot be restored. He added that about 600 more facilities was planned to be reviewed.

Amnesty International, on 14 January 2021, reported that in Shikharkh, out of 34 apartment buildings built in the town, at least 25 of them were struck, the roofs of eight buildings were destroyed, and hundreds of other apartments and administrative buildings sustained varying degrees of damage.

== Reactions ==
=== Azerbaijan ===
On 14 October, Head of the Foreign Policy Department of the Azerbaijani Presidential Administration, Hikmet Hajiyev, labelled Tartar as the Stalingrad of Azerbaijan.

The following day, the Archbishop of the Diocese of Baku and Azerbaijan of the Russian Orthodox Church, Alexander Ischein, stated that Armenia's "shelling of people in Azerbaijan's Tartar district who participated in the funeral ceremony" was inhuman. On 19 October, the President of Azerbaijan, Ilham Aliyev, stated that Armenia wanted to "turn Tartar into Stalingrad, into the second Aghdam, Fuzuli." On the same day, the Azerbaijani ombudsman Sabina Aliyeva, in reference to the Armenian shelling of a cemetery in Tartar, stated that the Armenian side had continued to "deliberately fire at the densely populated settlements of Azerbaijan", adding that the "regular shelling of civilian settlements and holy places by the Armenian armed forces proves once again that Armenia... is intolerant of people of other nationalities and faiths".

=== Turkey ===
On 15 November, the Ministry of Foreign Affairs of Turkey strongly condemned the Armenian shelling of a cemetery in Tartar during a funeral ceremony, stating that with the attack, Armenia "showed the world its unlawful face that is incompatible with humanitarian values". On the same day, members of the Grand National Assembly of Turkey's Human Rights Investigation Commission visited the city of Tartar. Hakan Çavuşoğlu, the chairman of the commission, stated that for the last two days, they've faced "the kind of scenes that people wouldn't think of".
