= Qapanlı =

Qapanlı may refer to:

- Qapanlı, Shamkir, Azerbaijan
- Qapanlı, Tartar

- Yuxarı Qapanlı, Azerbaijan
- Aşağı Qapanlı, Azerbaijan
- Alışarlı, Azerbaijan

- Kapanly, Azerbaijan
