= Ələsgərli =

Ələsgərli is an Azerbaijani name originally derived from the first name Alasgar and may refer to:

== Towns & Villages ==
- Ələsgərli, Shamkir, Azerbaijan
- Ələsgərli, Tartar, Azerbaijan
- Ələsgərli, Füzuli, Azerbaijan

== People ==
- Almaz Ələsgərli (Almaz Ələsgərova, Almaz Alasgarli), an Azerbaijani mugham singer and actress.
- Nüşabə Ələsgərli (Nushaba Alasgarli), an Azerbaijani singer, pianist, actress and TV presenter.
- Müşfiq Ələsgərli (Mushfig Alasgarli), Chairman of the Trade Union of Journalists of Azerbaijan
- Ələsgər Ələsgərli (Alasgar Alasgarli) - Head of the Center for Russian-Slavic Studies of the "Turkish Institute of the XXI Century".
