= Qapanlı, Tartar =

Qapanlı, Tartar may refer to:

- Qapanlı (larger), Tartar
- Qapanlı (smaller), Tartar
- Qapanlı, Azad Qaraqoyunlu
- Qapanlı, İrəvanlı
