= Sarıcalı =

Sarıcalı or Sarydzhaly may refer to:

- Sarıcalı, Agdam, Azerbaijan
- Sarıcalı, Aghjabadi, Azerbaijan
- Sarıcalı, Jabrayil, Azerbaijan
- In Tartar Rayon:
  - Sarıcalı, Tartar, Azerbaijan
  - Yuxarı Sarıcalı, Azerbaijan

== See also ==
- Sarıcalar (disambiguation)
