= Elman Huseynov =

National Hero of Azerbaijan

- Elman Hüseynov
- Born: 28 February 1952; Azadkarakoyunlu, Tartar, Azerbaijan SSR
- Died: 14 January 1993 (aged 40); Azadkarakoyunlu, Tartar, Azerbaijan
- Military career
- Allegiance: Azerbaijan
- Branch: Azerbaijani Armed Forces
- Service years: 1991–1993
- Conflicts: First Nagorno-Karabakh War
- Awards: National Hero of Azerbaijan; 1995

Elman Huseynov oglu Suleyman (Azerbaijani: Elman Süleyman oğlu Hüseynov; 28 February 1952, Azadkarakoyunlu, Tartar, Azerbaijan SSR – 14 January 1993, Azadkarakoyunlu, Tartar, Azerbaijan) was an Azerbaijani commander, National Hero of Azerbaijan.

== Early life and education ==
Huseynov was born in Azadkarakoyunlu village of Tartar on 28 February 1952. He studied at the local secondary school from 1958 to 1968. He was admitted to the Hydromelioration faculty of Azerbaijan State Polytechnics Institute in 1968 and graduated in 1973 with a degree in engineering. He served as a lieutenant in Akhalkalaki of the Georgian SSR from 1973 to 1975.

He studied at Baku Supreme Party School from 1980 to 1982. He worked as the Chairman of the People Control Committee of Tartar District from 1982 to 1985, the First Deputy Chairman of Tartar District People's Deputies Executive Committee from 1985 to 1988, Chief of the Tartarchay Hydroxide Exploitation Office from 1988 to 1990 and then as an instructor at the Regional Party Committee. He was elected to Regional Soviet several times.

He graduated from the National Economy Management Institute under the Cabinet of Ministers with Honors Diploma.

He was married, had three children.

== First Nagorno-Karabakh war ==
Although he worked at high level state positions, he applied to the Ministry of Defense regarding voluntarily establishment of the tabor for defense of Tartar in 1991; he was the Chief of Tartar Self-Defense Headquarters in September 1991, Commander of the territorial Self-Defense Battalion in November 1991. He took an active part in the clashes for Aghdara and surrounding settlements against the Armenian soldiers. A number of soldiers of Armenian side were killed and their technical equipment were damaged as a result of the battle operations under his personal leadership.

He was injured at the battles twice. On 14 January 1993 he died in a battle around the village of Vank.

== Honors ==
Elman Huseynov oglu Suleyman was posthumously awarded the honorary title of the "National Hero of Azerbaijan" under Presidential Decree No. 262, dated 15 January 1995.

He was buried in Garagoyunlu village of Tartar District. One of the streets in Tartar District and a museum were named after him.

== See also ==
- First Nagorno-Karabakh War
- List of National Heroes of Azerbaijan
