= İsmayılbəyli =

İsmayılbəyli or Ismayilbeyli or Ismayilbayli may refer to:

- İsmayılbəyli, Agdam, Azerbaijan
- İsmayılbəyli, Tartar, Azerbaijan
