= 2014 Kalbajar incident =

Incident across the Nagorno-Karabakh Line of Contact

2014 Kalbajar incident refers to the crossing of a small group of Azerbaijanis into Kalbajar district, their subsequent capture and conviction for murder and sabotage by the Republic of Artsakh. In July 2014, three ethnic Azerbaijanis crossed Nagorno-Karabakh Line of Contact in to Kalbajar District, then controlled by breakaway Republic of Artsakh forces. This was followed by disappearance of 17-year-old local Smbat Tsakanyan who was later found dead from gunshot wounds and who was last seen walking with the Azerbaijanis in a video used as evidence in the trial. The Azerbaijanis were detained for "reconnaissance operations in the area on orders from Azerbaijan’s intelligence service," as well as kidnapping and killing of Tsakanyan. One of the Azerbaijanis named Hasanov attacked Major Sargis Abrahamyan and his companion Karine Davtyan on the road from Vardenis to Kalbajar, killing the first and wounding the latter, himself subsequently killed in firefight with Artsakh Defence Army servicemen. The Artsakh forces detained and convicted Asgarov and Guliyev for murdering Tsakanyan while Hasanov was posthumously convicted for killing Abrahamyan and wounding Davtyan. Asgarov and Guliyev pleaded not guilty, claiming they had crossed to Kalbajar "to visit their relatives' graves". The incident may have been a trigger of the 2014 Armenian–Azerbaijani clashes in late July and early August that year. After ceasefire agreement ended the 2020 Nagorno-Karabakh war, Armenia returned Asgarov and Guliyev to Azerbaijan, as part of a prisoner exchange.

== Background on the assailants ==
Dilgam Asgarov, was born in 1960 in the village of Azizli in the Vardenis district of the Armenian SSR, adjacent to Kalbajar District of the Azerbaijani SSR. He served as a scout in Kalbajar on the Azerbaijani side during the First Nagorno-Karabakh War and holds Russian citizenship.

Shahbaz Guliyev, was born in 1968 in the village of Gapanli in the Tartar District of the Azerbaijani SSR. Before the July 2014 incident, Asgarov lived and worked in Russia, cutting trees and selling wood, coming home only infrequently to see his family.

Dilgam Asgarov's mother was buried in the village of Shaplar in the Kalbajar district taken by Armenian forces in 1993. Asgarov reportedly first crossed the Line of Contact in 1999 to visit his mother's grave. He told Azerbaijani media about his trip a few years later and went to Kalbajar several more times before his capture in 2014. Asgarov took videos and photos during his trips. On at least one occasion in 2007, he was accompanied to Kalbajar by Shahbaz Guliyev. In a video made by Asgarov during his 2007 trip to Kalbajar, he and Guliyev can be seen armed with AK machine guns with silencers, confiscated from them after their capture by Artsakh authorities in 2014.

Hasan Hasanov, was born in 1978 in the Mehdili village of the Jabrayil District, previously located on the Line of Contact. According to his brother, Nayil Hasanov, he worked as a shopkeeper and taxi driver in Baku. Hasanov's social media profiles stated that he was a graduate of Jamshid Nakhchivanski Military Lyceum and Azerbaijan Higher Military Academy, which would suggest he held an officer's rank in Azerbaijan's military.

== The incident ==
On June 29, 2014, Dilgam Asgarov, Shahbaz Guliyev, and Hasan Hasanov crossed the Nagorno-Karabakh Line of Contact into the Kalbajar District. In a video dated to July 2 shot by Asgarov, the three men are seen preparing food together somewhere in Kalbajar District. Asgarov states in the video that they have come to teach Hasanov about the area and calls on Azerbaijani soldiers not to be afraid to cross into Kalbajar. In another video, they are seen bearing machine guns near an Armenian sign pointing towards Kalbajar.

On the night of July 3–4, 17-year-old Smbat Tsakanyan went missing from his family's farmhouse located 20-25 kilometers from Kalbajar town. His family and other locals began searching for him, but did not initially suspect that he was kidnapped. In a video presented at Asgarov and Guliyev's trial, Tsakanyan and two other Azerbaijanis were apparently seen walking through a forest in Kalbajar. According to the Armenian authorities, Asgarov, who allegedly shot the video, can be heard saying that they had captured a "piglet", adding that he was about 20 years old and couldn't speak Azerbaijani, and that they could not release him because he would denounce them. During his trial, Asgarov commented on the footage saying that he and the others only asked Tsakanyan to show them the way to Kalbajar town, and that they did not kidnap him.

On July 8 reports emerged in Armenia and Artsakh of two Azerbaijanis spotted near Kalbajar. A search was initiated, and Guliyev was detained that day, while Asgarov fled and was captured by July 11. At some point, Hasanov was separated from Asgarov and on July 11, he allegedly attacked Major Sargis Abrahamyan and Karine Davtyan on the road from Vardenis to Kalbajar, killing Abrahamyan and wounding Davtyan before taking their car. According to the Armenian authorities, Hasanov drove the vehicle about 7 kilometers before being stopped by servicemen of Artsakh Defence Army, after which he was killed in a firefight. Smbat Tsakanyan's body was found on July 15 in a forested area between Kalbajar and Sinigkilsa; the Armenian authorities determined the cause of his death to be multiple gunshot wounds.

Hasanov's body was handed over to Azerbaijan in October 2014 and buried in Baku. The Armenian authorities claim the three were performing reconnaissance operations in the area "on orders from Azerbaijan’s intelligence service," then kidnapped and killed the 17-year-old Smbat Tsakanyan. The incident may have been one cause of the 2014 Armenian–Azerbaijani clashes in late July and early August that year.

== Trial ==
Asgarov and Guliyev were tried in Stepanakert, the capital of the self-proclaimed Republic of Artsakh. In October 2014, they were charged with illegal border crossing, illegal arms possession, espionage, kidnapping, and the murder of Smbat Tsakanyan. Asgarov and Guliyev both pleaded not guilty to the murder charge and accused each other during the trial. Asgarov stated during the trial that he unsuccessfully tried to convince his companions not to kill Tsakanyan; Guliyev dismissed Asgarov's claims as lies. The prosecution asserted that Tsakanyan was killed with an assault rifle confiscated from Asgarov. In interviews given after his release from imprisonment in 2020, Asgarov stated that he did not know about Tsakanyan's death, and that the Armenians who were killed during the July 2014 incident were killed by Armenian forces.

On December 29, 2014, The Stepanakert Residence of the General Jurisdiction Court of First Instance of Nagorno Karabakh Republic sentenced Asgarov to life in prison and Guliyev to 22 years in prison (only Asgarov was convicted of Tsakanyan's murder). Asgarov and Guliyev appealed their sentence in January 2015. Their appeal was rejected by the Supreme Court of Artsakh in May that year. Azerbaijani authorities condemned the trial as illegal and demanded the release of the two men.

== Aftermath ==
During the 2020 Nagorno-Karabakh war, there were reports that Asgarov and Guliyev were taken to Armenia. After the ceasefire agreement, as a result of negotiations with the participation of international organizations and the Russian Peacekeeping Command, Armenia and Azerbaijan agreed to exchange prisoners and hostages. Dilgam Asgarov and Shahbaz Guliyev were returned to Azerbaijan on 14 December 2020. According to the president of the Republic of Artsakh, Arayik Harutyunyan, the decision to return Asgarov and Guliyev was made with the consent of the parents of Smbat Tsakanyan.

In 2020 interview, Asgarov stated that he was subjected to "immeasurable torture" during his imprisonment, adding "the Armenian captors constantly abused his body, as well as his hands and nails" and that "was poorly fed" throughout the years. In an interview with Al Jazeera, Asgarov said Armenians broke his fingers and electrocuted him, adding that he was "immobilised from the heavy blows" to his head and that the Armenians did not even allow him to "breathe normally".

The Head of the Central Information Department of the Office of the President of the Republic of Artsakh and Deputy Head of the NKR President's Office, David Babayan, described these allegations of torture as deliberate fabrications, pointing out that: “The ICRC conducts monitoring of the custody and health condition of the mentioned persons, and no trace of torture was found.”

On May 18, 2022, in a live interview given to the Azerbaijani TV channel Khural, Shahbaz Guliyev said that he and Dilgam Askerov were supplied with weapons and sent to Kalbajar in 2014 by the office of the former Deputy Prime Minister of Azerbaijan Ali Hasanov. He also stated that the Ministry of Defense of Azerbaijan was informed about it in advance. Ali Hasanov, in response, stated that he never met Shahbaz Guliyev and doesn't even know him and advised to contact Dilgam Asgarov.
