= Umudlu =

Umudlu or Umutlu may refer to:

- Umudlu, Agdam, Azerbaijan
- Umudlu, Tartar, Azerbaijan
- Umudlu (Sarov), Tartar, Azerbaijan
