= Rəcəbli =

Rəcəbli or Radzhabli may refer to:

- Rəcəbli, Jalilabad, Azerbaijan
- Rəcəbli, Tartar, Azerbaijan
