= Qapanlı (Qaraağacı), Tartar =

Qapanlı is a village in the municipality of Qaraağacı in the Tartar Rayon of Azerbaijan.
