= Soylan =

Soylan may refer to:

- Vayk, Armenia
- Soyulan, Azerbaijan
