= Bayandurlu =

- Village and municipality
- Location in Azerbaijan.
- Coordinates: 40°27′N 46°59′E
- Country: Azerbaijan
- Rayon: Tartar

Population
  - Total: 428

Bayandurlu is a village and municipality in the Tartar Rayon of Azerbaijan. It has a population of 428.
