= İlxıçılar, Tartar =

İlxıçılar
- Location within Azerbaijan Location within Karabakh Economic Region
- Coordinates: 40°14′N 47°07′E
- Country: Azerbaijan
- Rayon: Tartar
- Municipality: Azad Qaraqoyunlu
- Time zone: UTC+4 (AZT)
  - Summer (DST): UTC+5 (AZT)

İlxıçılar (also, Ilxıçılar and Ilkhychylar) is a village in the Tartar Rayon of Azerbaijan. The village forms part of the municipality of Azad Qaraqoyunlu.
