= Hacallı, Tartar =

Hacallı
- Location within Azerbaijan Location within Karabakh Economic Region
- Coordinates: 40°12′15″N 47°03′50″E
- Country: Azerbaijan
- Rayon: Tartar
- Municipality: İrəvanlı
- Time zone: UTC+4 (AZT)
  - Summer (DST): UTC+5 (AZT)

Hacallı (also, Ha-callı and Gadzhally) is a village in the Tartar Rayon of Azerbaijan. The village forms part of the municipality of İrəvanlı.
