= Əskipara =

Əskipara (Eskipara) may refer to:

- Əskipara, Tartar, Azerbaijan
- Aşağı Əskipara, Azerbaijan
- Yuxarı Əskipara, Azerbaijan
