= Qazyan =

Qazyan or Qəziyan or Qəzyan or Kaziyan may refer to:

- Qazyan, Qubadli, Azerbaijan
- Qazyan, Tartar, Azerbaijan
- Qazyan, Ujar, Azerbaijan
- Qaziyan, Iran
- Qazian-e Olya, Iran
- Qazian-e Sofla, Iran
