= 2014 Armenian–Azerbaijani clashes =

Skirmishes between Armenia and Azerbaijan

2014 Armenian–Azerbaijani border clashes
- Part of Nagorno-Karabakh conflict
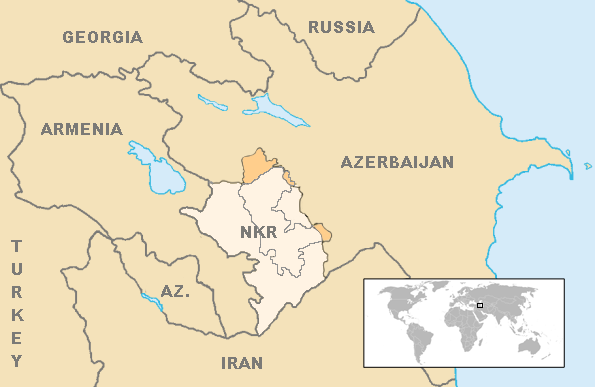
- Territory controlled by the Nagorno-Karabakh Republic Territory claimed by the Nagorno-Karabakh Republic but controlled by Azerbaijan
Date	27 July – 8 August 2014 (1 week and 5 days)
Location	Nagorno-Karabakh line of contact Armenia–Azerbaijan state border
Result	Status quo ante bellum

Belligerents
Armenia; Artsakh	Azerbaijan

Casualties and losses
(Republic of Artsakh) 6 soldiers killed	(Azerbaijan) 13 soldiers killed

Clashes on the Armenian–Azerbaijan border (Tavush–Qazakh) and the line of contact between the Nagorno-Karabakh and Azerbaijan started on 27 July 2014. Reported casualties of the clashes were some of the highest since the 1994 ceasefire agreement that ended the First Nagorno-Karabakh War.

== Background ==
As the Soviet Union was dissolving, ethnic Armenians in Azerbaijan fought a brief conflict, backed by Armenia proper, that resulted in the de facto independence of Nagorno-Karabakh (NKR) alongside a 1994 ceasefire agreement and what academics have called a frozen conflict. At the same time, Azerbaijan controls the exclave of the Nakhichivan Autonomous Republic bordering Armenia that is not contiguous with its main territory.

Further, at the General Debate during the United Nations General Assembly, Armenia and Azerbaijan have regularly used their two allotted Rights of Reply for at least the last few years in argument over the conflict.

== Clashes ==
=== Summer ===
In early August 2014, Azerbaijani forces reported a total of twelve military casualties. Eight of these were reported on 1 August 2014 after three days of sporadic fighting, with another four deaths reported on 2 August 2014. The Ministry of Defense of Nagorno-Karabakh reported one military casualty.

The Ministry of Defense of Azerbaijan stated that the four soldiers killed on 2 August 2014 died in a clash with what they called "Armenian sabotage groups" conducting an operation in the Aghdam–Tartar area. There were other injuries reported, but they were not life-threatening. The Nagorno-Karabakh Ministry of Defense said that its only casualty occurred in what it labeled a "successful repulsion of an attack by Azerbaijani commando units." NKR authorities later upgraded their death toll to three soldiers.

On 6 August 2014, the total death toll from both sides reached 18 people. The same day it was revealed that the presidents of both countries were to meet to discuss the clashes on neutral ground in Sochi.

On 7 August 2014, Karen Petrosian, from Chinari village in Karabakh, traveled into Azerbaijani territory and was captured, later dying while in custody. Initial news reports from Baku said that Petrosian had been detained by villagers in Azerbaijan's Tovuz district and handed over to military authorities. The Azerbaijan Defense Ministry claimed afterwards, however, that Petrosian was a member of an Armenian commando squad that tried unsuccessfully to conduct a cross-border sabotage attack. It said Azerbaijani troops captured him after killing four other Armenian soldiers. The Armenian military dismissed that claim. Images released by the Azerbaijani authorities late on Thursday showed two masked men in army fatigues posing for a photograph with Petrosian, in which the latter wore army boots and a camouflage vest. Earlier photographs of Petrosian, apparently taken by Azerbaijani civilians, showed him wearing sneakers and no evidence of a military uniform. The Defense Ministry in Baku claimed that “acute heart and lung failure” was the likely cause of Petrosian's death. Armenia's government claimed that Petrosian was tortured to death.

Azerbaijani citizen, Shahbaz Guliyev, and a Russian national, Dilgham Asgarov, were taken captive in Karabakh for suspected commando activities. The Armenian government said that the two were caught in the act, with a third man, Hasan Hasanov, killed during their capture. The announcement of Guliyev's capture coincided with an official confirmation that a 17-year-old ethnic Armenian resident of Kelbajar, Smbat Tsakanian, went missing a week prior. Officials in Stepanakert did not rule out a connection between his disappearance and the alleged Azerbaijani infiltration. Baku has denied that the two individuals have anything to do with the military, and has demanded that the International Committee of the Red Cross secure their release, as well as the return of Hasanov's body. “If Armenia is currently demonstrating such a position on releasing the hostages and returning the body, how we can talk about the desire to coexist in the future based on mutual confidence[?]” senior presidential administration official Ali Hasanov asked the ICRC last month. (Baku does not negotiate with representatives of separatist Karabakh.) Azerbaijani media reported that the ICRC visited the two men on 12 August 2014. The organization did not comment publicly. Meanwhile, Armenian Defense Minister Seyran Ohanian called for the punishment of both men—a call that was likely to pick up popular momentum after the death of Petrosian.

On 29 December 2014 a court in Nagorno-Karabakh sentenced Dilgam Askerov to life in prison for illegal border crossing and arms possession, espionage and kidnapping as well as for the murder of Smbat Tsakanian. Shahbaz Quliyev was sentenced to 22 years in prison for illegal border crossing and arms possession, espionage and kidnapping.

The Azerbaijani Government denounced the trial as illegal and demanded the release of both men. The Foreign Ministry in Baku spokesman Hikmet Hajiyev stated: "The 'trial' held in the occupied territories of Azerbaijan has no legal force" and Baku will continue to press the international community to secure the release of the two "hostages." While authorities in Stepanakert stated the two Azerbaijanis cannot be treated like prisoners of war because their "brutal and inhuman" actions targeted a civilian.

== Reactions ==
=== Involved parties ===
- Armenia – Defense Minister Seyran Ohanyan stated at the height of the clashes: "At any moment our neighbor may undoubtedly organize provocations that could lead to war. But the president and military-political leadership of the country are doing everything to calm things down. The analysis of [the events of] the last few days shows that, broadly speaking, there is still no basis for a large-scale war."
- Azerbaijan – MP Ganira Pashayeva criticized the international organizations for their indifferent position on the recent escalation of tensions along the Armenian-Azerbaijani border.

=== International ===
Supranational bodies

- European Union — The European External Action Service called "on both sides to immediately respect the ceasefire, refrain from the use of force or any threat thereof, and continue efforts towards a peaceful resolution of the Nagorno-Karabakh conflict."
- Organization for Security and Cooperation in Europe (OSCE) Minsk Group - U.S. co-chair James Warlick, wrote on Twitter: We are seriously concerned *about the recent upsurge in violence along the line of contact. The ceasefire needs to be respected."
- (United Nations) Ban Ki-moon expressed his "deep concern" over the clashes and has urged the countries to refrain from further violence.

States

- France – President Francois Hollande hosted unnamed leaders from both Armenia and Azerbaijan for talks but it did not result in any breakthrough. An unnamed member of Hollande's entourage claimed in October: "What happened in Ukraine has had a direct impact. [Russia's annexation of Crimea] exacerbated the climate."
- Georgia — President Giorgi Margvelashvili stated that Georgia is friend to both Armenia and Azerbaijan and added, "Regional stability and potential of this region should be directed solely towards progress and better life of our people and not in any way towards conflicts." Prime Minister Irakli Garibashvili expressed concern over recent flare-up of violence and stated, "We are watching closely the developments in our neighboring, friendly states. I hope and I am confident that they will come to an agreement soon and peace will be restored in this region."
- Germany — Foreign Minister Frank-Walter Steinmeier visited Armenia and Azerbaijan to try and facilitate a negotiated solution to the conflict.
- Iran — Foreign Ministry Spokeswoman Marzieyeh Afkham urged Armenia and Azerbaijan to hold talks to reach an agreement. She expressed regret over the killing of several people in a recent military clash and invited both sides to exercise restraint.
- Russia – The Foreign Ministry issued a statement that read it "extends its most sincere condolences to the families of the victims" and "considers the events of the past few days a serious violation of ceasefire agreements and declared its intention to find a political settlement of the conflict." The deputy director of the Foreign Ministry's Information and Press Department, Maria Zakharova, said that "further escalation is unacceptable" and that "we urge all the warring sides to exercise restraint, give up the use of force and take urgent measures aimed at stabilizing the situation".
- Turkey – Prime Minister Recep Tayyip Erdoğan called Aliyev to offer his condolences. The Ministry of Foreign Affairs issued a statement that read it: "We are following with sorrow and concern the recent clashes that occurred on the line of contact on the occupied Azerbaijani territories which resulted in the loss of many lives. We wish God’s mercy to our Azerbaijani brothers who were martyred in the conflicts and extend our condolences to their families and the brotherly people of Azerbaijan.
- United States – On 1 August, the United States called on the sides "to take immediate action to reduce tensions and respect the cease-fire." The U.S. Department of State deputy spokeswoman, Marie Harf, said that the State Department is urging the leaders of Armenia and Azerbaijan to meet "at the earliest opportunity to resume dialogue on key issues."

== See also ==
- 2014 Armenian Mil Mi-24 shootdown
