= Qırmızı-Saqqallar =

Village in Azerbaijan

Coordinates: 40.443611°N 46.863333°E

Qırmızı-Saqqallar (also, Qırmızısaqqallar) is a village in the municipality of Borsunlu in the Tartar Rayon of Azerbaijan.
