= Kövdadıq =

- Location within Azerbaijan Location within Karabakh Economic Region
- Coordinates: 40°26′28″N 46°55′32″E
- Country: Azerbaijan
- Rayon: Tartar
- Municipality: Rəcəbli
- Time zone: UTC+4 (AZT)
  - Summer (DST): UTC+5 (AZT)

Kövdadıq (also Kevdadykh) is a village in the Tartar Rayon of Azerbaijan. The village forms part of the municipality of Rəcəbli.
