= Vazir Orujov =

Vazir Orujov Vəzir Surxay oğlu Orucov
- Born: December 26, 1956; Xoruzlu, Tartar
- Died: March 22, 1993 (aged 36); Lachin, Azerbaijan
- Military career
- Allegiance: Republic of Azerbaijan
- Service years: 1992–1993
- Conflicts: First Nagorno-Karabakh War
- Awards: National Hero of Azerbaijan; 1993

Vazir Surkhay oglu Orujov (Azerbaijani: Vəzir Surxay oğlu Orucov) is the National Hero of Azerbaijan and a participant in the First Nagorno-Karabakh War.

== Early life and education ==
Vazir Orujov was born on December 26, 1956, in Xoruzlu village, Tartar region. He was an Azerbaijani Kurd. He received his secondary education at Xoruzlu village High School, and was admitted to Baku Light Industry Technical School in 1974. He was drafted to the military in 1975, demobilized from the army in 1977 and continued his uncompleted secondary specialized education. In 1984 Orujov moved to Belkovo city of Arkhangelsk Oblast, Russia.

== Karabakh war and participation in battles ==
In 1992, being aware of the Khojaly massacre, he came back to Azerbaijan, and joined the Tartar self-defense battalion on May 4. Though Orujov started fighting as a private soldier, within a very short period of time, he was promoted to the position of Deputy Battalion Commander for his command skills. He left his home stating that he was leaving for Tartar city. By taking a gun of wounded police officer he met on his way to Shikharkh, he joined the battle for Aghdara informing no one in this concern.

In August 1992 Orujov was on a reconnaissance mission in Sarsang Reservoir. He was accompanied with 30 scouts armed with PK machine guns. The group of Sardar Hamidov attacked from the front, and the group of scouts of Orujov attacked from the back. The Arabo battalion suffered a great loss in that day.

On September 1, 1992, in a battle for Childiran village while intending to shoot the tank of the enemy, he was hardly wounded. On March 22, 1993, in hard battles for Globus height of Aghdara he died.

== Honors ==
Orujov was buried in Martyrs' Lane in Baku city. Pursuant to the decree No.495 of the President of the Republic of Azerbaijan dated March 27, 1993 he was awarded the name of National Hero of Azerbaijan after his death.

== See also ==
- First Nagorno-Karabakh War
- National Hero of Azerbaijan
