= Yuxarı Məzrə =

- Location within Azerbaijan
- Coordinates: 39°27′33.4″N 46°57′11.5″E
- Country: Azerbaijan
- District: Khojavend

Population (2015)
  - Total: 39
- Time zone: UTC+4 (AZT)

Yuxarı Məzrə (Yukhary Mazra) is a former village in the current Khojavend District of Azerbaijan. Before its abolition, the village was part of the Sarijali Rural administrative division of the Jabrayil District. By the Law of the Republic of Azerbaijan dated December 5, 2023, Yukhary Mazra was abolished, and its territory transferred to Khojavend District.

== History ==
By the Decision No. 54-XII of the Supreme Soviet of the Republic of Azerbaijan dated February 7, 1991, Yukhari Mazra village of Jabrayil District was included in the list of localities of the District within the Shukurbeyli Village Soviet.

The village was under the occupation of the Armenian forces of the self-proclaimed Republic of Nagorno-Karabakh until its recapture by Azerbaijan Army on November 7, 2020. While under occupation it was a part of Hadrut Province of the self-proclaimed Republic of Nagorno-Karabakh during the period between 1993 and 2020, referred to as Dzoragyugh (Armenian: Ձորագյուղ).

As per Administrative divisions of Azerbaijan, the village was part of the Sarijali Rural administrative division of the Jabrayil District till 2023. By the Law of the Republic of Azerbaijan dated December 5, 2023, Yukhary Mazra was abolished, and its territory was transferred to the Khojavend District.
