= Güləbatlı =

Coordinates: 40°23′N 47°00′E

Güləbatlı (also, Qüləbatlı) is a village and municipality in the Tartar Rayon of Azerbaijan. It has a population of 371.
