= Evoğlu =

Evoğlu or Evogly may refer to:

- Evoğlu, Agdam, Azerbaijan
- Evoğlu, Tartar, Azerbaijan

Also:

- Ivughli, in Iran
