= Bildirçinli =

- Location within Azerbaijan Location within Karabakh Economic Region
- Coordinates: 40°28′N 46°56′E
- Country: Azerbaijan
- Rayon: Tartar
- Municipality: Sarov
- Time zone: UTC+4 (AZT)
  - Summer (DST): UTC+5 (AZT)

Bildirçinli (also, Bildirchinli) is a village in the Tartar Rayon of Azerbaijan.

Bildirchinli is a village in Sarov administrative territorial unit of Tartar district. It is on the bank of Incachay, in the Karabakh plain. According to the information provided by the local population, the village was built in the area called Bildircinli. It was named so because there are many quail birds in the area. Researchers believe that the toponym of Bildircinli is an ethnotoponym
