= Kamandar =

- Location within Azerbaijan
- Coordinates: 40°48′10″N 45°44′05″E
- Country: Azerbaijan
- Rayon: Shamkir
- Municipality: Ələsgərli
- Time zone: UTC+4 (AZT)
  - Summer (DST): UTC+5 (AZT)

Kamandar (also, Komandar) is a village in the Shamkir Rayon of Azerbaijan. The village forms part of the municipality of Ələsgərli.
