= Umudlu (Sarov), Tartar =

Umudlu
- Location within Azerbaijan Location within Karabakh Economic Region
- Coordinates: 40°27′24″N 46°55′26″E
- Country: Azerbaijan
- Rayon: Tartar
- Municipality: Sarov
- Time zone: UTC+4 (AZT)
  - Summer (DST): UTC+5 (AZT)

Umudly (also, Umutly) is a village in the Tartar Rayon of Azerbaijan. The village forms part of the municipality of Sarov.
