= Yuxarı Sarıcalı =

- Municipality
- Location within Azerbaijan Location within Karabakh Economic Region
- Coordinates: 40°05′52″N 47°02′40″E
- Country: Azerbaijan
- Rayon: Tartar
- Time zone: UTC+4 (AZT)
  - Summer (DST): UTC+5 (AZT)

Yuxarı Sarıcalı (also, Sarydzhaly) is a village and municipality in the Tartar Rayon of Azerbaijan.
