= Xoruzlu =

- Municipality
- Location within Azerbaijan Location within Karabakh Economic Region
- Coordinates: 40°26′29″N 47°01′10″E
- Country: Azerbaijan
- Rayon: Tartar

Population
  - Total: 1,400
- Time zone: UTC+4 (AZT)
  - Summer (DST): UTC+5 (AZT)

Xoruzlu (also, Khoruzlu) is a village and municipality in the Tartar Rayon of Azerbaijan. It has a population of 1,400.

== Notable natives ==
- Vazir Orujov — National Hero of Azerbaijan.
