= Sarov, Tartar =

Sarov
- Municipality
- Location within Azerbaijan Location within Karabakh Economic Region
- Coordinates: 40°28′33″N 46°56′12″E
- Country: Azerbaijan
- Rayon: Tartar

Population
  - Total: 1,495
- Time zone: UTC+4 (AZT)
  - Summer (DST): UTC+5 (AZT)

Sarov (also, Musul’man Sarov, Musulman-Zarov, and Musurman-Sarov) is a village and municipality in the Tartar Rayon of Azerbaijan. It has a population of 1,495. The municipality consists of the villages of Sarov, Bildirçinli and Umudlu.
