= Qaynaq =

- Municipality
- Location within Azerbaijan Location within Karabakh Economic Region
- Coordinates: 40°16′00″N 47°01′11″E
- Country: Azerbaijan
- Rayon: Tartar

Population
  - Total: 1,590
- Time zone: UTC+4 (AZT)
  - Summer (DST): UTC+5 (AZT)

Qaynaq (also, Kaynag and Kaynakh) is a village and municipality in the Tartar Rayon of Azerbaijan. It has a population of 1,590.
