= Köçərli =

- Municipality
- Location within Azerbaijan Location within Karabakh Economic Region
- Coordinates: 40°16′26″N 47°03′30″E
- Country: Azerbaijan
- Rayon: Tartar
- Elevation: 105 m (344 ft)

Population
  - Total: 1,528
- Time zone: UTC+4 (AZT)
  - Summer (DST): UTC+5 (AZT)

Köçərli (also, Kuçərli and Kyucharli) is a village and municipality in the Tartar Rayon of Azerbaijan. It has a population of 1,528.
