= Dəmirçilər, Tartar =

Dəmirçilər
- Municipality
- Location within Azerbaijan Location within Karabakh Economic Region
- Coordinates: 40°25′36″N 46°53′45″E
- Country: Azerbaijan
- Rayon: Tartar

Population
  - Total: 1,078
- Time zone: UTC+4 (AZT)
  - Summer (DST): UTC+5 (AZT)

Dəmirçilər (also, Damirchilyar and Demirchilyar) is a village and municipality in the Tartar Rayon of Azerbaijan. It has a population of 1,078.
