= Mamırlı =

- Municipality
- Location within Azerbaijan Location within Karabakh Economic Region
- Coordinates: 40°19′23″N 47°04′38″E
- Country: Azerbaijan
- Rayon: Tartar
- Elevation: 107 m (351 ft)

Population
  - Total: 1,547
- Time zone: UTC+4 (AZT)
  - Summer (DST): UTC+5 (AZT)

Mamırlı (also, Mamyrly) is a village and municipality in the Tartar Rayon of Azerbaijan. It has a population of 1,547.
