= Terter operation =

Large-scale offensive by Armenian forces

- Part of First Nagorno-Karabakh War
Date	April – May 1994
Location	Terter, Aghdam and Goranboy District Azerbaijan
Result	Armenian victory

Belligerents
Nagorno-Karabakh (Note: Nagorno-Karabakh Autonomous Oblast (NKAO) until 1991.)	Azerbaijan (Note: Azerbaijan Soviet Socialist Republic (Soviet Azerbaijan) until 1991.)

Commanders and leaders
Samvel Babayan; Manvel Grigoryan; Nelson Soghomonyan; Sergei Chalyan	Najmeddin Sadikov; Elbrus Orudzhev †; Rovshan Akbarov; Maharram Seyidov

Strength
Stepanakert Regiment; 5th motorized rifle brigade 83rd motorized rifle brigade separate motorized rifle battalion "Tigran Mets"	776th Separate Reconnaissance; 777th motorized rifle regiment 701st motorized rifle brigade 703rd motorized rifle brigade

Casualties and losses
Unknown	600 killed
- 50,000 Azerbaijanis displaced

Terter operation (April–May 1994) - was a large-scale offensive by Armenian forces at the final stage of the First Karabakh war, accompanied by battles in the Terter, Agdam and Goranboy regions of Azerbaijan, as a result of which several villages in the Agdam and Terter regions came under the control of the NKR.

== Background ==
In late 1993 - early 1994, after a series of major defeats, Azerbaijan attempted a counteroffensive along the entire length of the front. Despite local successes, the Azerbaijanis failed to significantly change the situation on the battlefield and achieve a major victory. By February 1994, their offensive was stopped and actually repelled, there were no significant changes in the front line compared to the autumn of 1993. By the beginning of spring, the offensive potential of Azerbaijan depleted and the armed forces got exhausted.

In April 1994, the Armenian command planned a large-scale military operation which involved breaking through the defenses of the Azerbaijani army in the area of the city Terter (formerly Mir-Bashir) which occupies an important operational-strategic purpose, capturing it and further advancing to the regional centers of Barda and Yevlakh. Had it been successful, the North-west of Azerbaijan would be cut off from the rest of the territory of the republic, which would cause new flows of refugees. “The capture of the city by the Armenians could discredit the government of Heydar Aliyev with the subsequent end of the war on the terms of the Armenian side”.

== Battle ==
The offensive began on the night of April 10. The strikes were delivered in three diverging operational directions from the Mardakert region in the direction of the city of Terter, as well as to the west and south. Up to 2,000 servicemen and a large number of armored vehicles (including 17 tanks) and armored personnel carriers from the 83rd motorized rifle brigade and the Stepanakert mobile regiment were brought into battle.

According to the Azerbaijani side, on April 16, units of the Armenian army attempted to attack the villages of Talysh and Gulludzha in the Aghdam region. On April 17, from the early morning, after intensive artillery preparation, the Armenian armed formations again launched attacks on the village of Tapkarakoyunlu in the Goranboy region, and the next day they repeated an attempt at a tank breakthrough on the city of Terter, simultaneously attacking villages in the vicinity of the city with infantry.

On April 20, 1994, after 10 days of fierce fighting and repeated attempts to break through the front line, by introducing units of the 5th Motorized Rifle Brigade and the Tigran Mets battalion into battle, the Armenian troops managed to force the Azerbaijani units to retreat.Several settlements of the Aghdam and Terter regions came under the control of the Armenians, they also managed to advance in the direction of Goranboy-Shaumyanovsk. As trophies, 28 armored vehicles were captured - 8 tanks, 5 infantry fighting vehicles, 15 armored personnel carriers.

Despite the factor of surprise and the constant transfer of reinforcements, the Armenian troops failed to achieve their goals. Relying on the fortified region of Terter, the Azerbaijanis were able to organize a defense, inflicting counterattacks and using massive firepower by artillery, attack aircraft and combat helicopters on the advancing Armenian group.
