= Rəcəbli, Tartar =

Rəcəbli
- Municipality
- Location within Azerbaijan Location within Karabakh Economic Region
- Coordinates: 40°27′N 46°54′E
- Country: Azerbaijan
- Rayon: Tartar

Population
  - Total: 484
- Time zone: UTC+4 (AZT)
  - Summer (DST): UTC+5 (AZT)

Rəcəbli (also, Radzhabli) is a village and municipality in the Tartar Rayon of Azerbaijan. It has a population of 484. The municipality consists of the villages of Rəcəbli and Kövdadıq.
