= İrəvanlı =

Irevanly
- Azerbaijani: İrəvanlı
- Location within Azerbaijan
- Coordinates: 40°20′17″N 47°02′57″E
- Country: Azerbaijan
- District: Tartar

Population
  - Total: 1,603
- Time zone: UTC+4 (AZT)
  - Summer (DST): UTC+5 (AZT)

İrəvanlı is a village and municipality in the Tartar District of Azerbaijan. It has a population of 1,603. The municipality consists of the villages of İrəvanlı, Gapanly, and Hajally.
