= Sarıcalar =

Sarıcalar or Sardzhalar may refer to:

- Sarıcalar, Saatly, is a village and municipality in the Saatly Rayon of Azerbaijan.
- Sarıcalar, Göynük, is a village in the District of Göynük, Bolu Province, Turkey.
- Sarıcalar, Sungurlu
- Sardzhalar, is a town in the Ararat Province of Armenia.

== See also ==
- Sarıcalı (disambiguation)
