= Borsunlu, Tartar =

Borsunlu
- Municipality
- Location within Azerbaijan Location within Karabakh Economic Region
- Coordinates: 40°26′37″N 46°51′48″E
- Country: Azerbaijan
- Rayon: Tartar

Population
  - Total: 1,093
- Time zone: UTC+4 (AZT)
  - Summer (DST): UTC+5 (AZT)

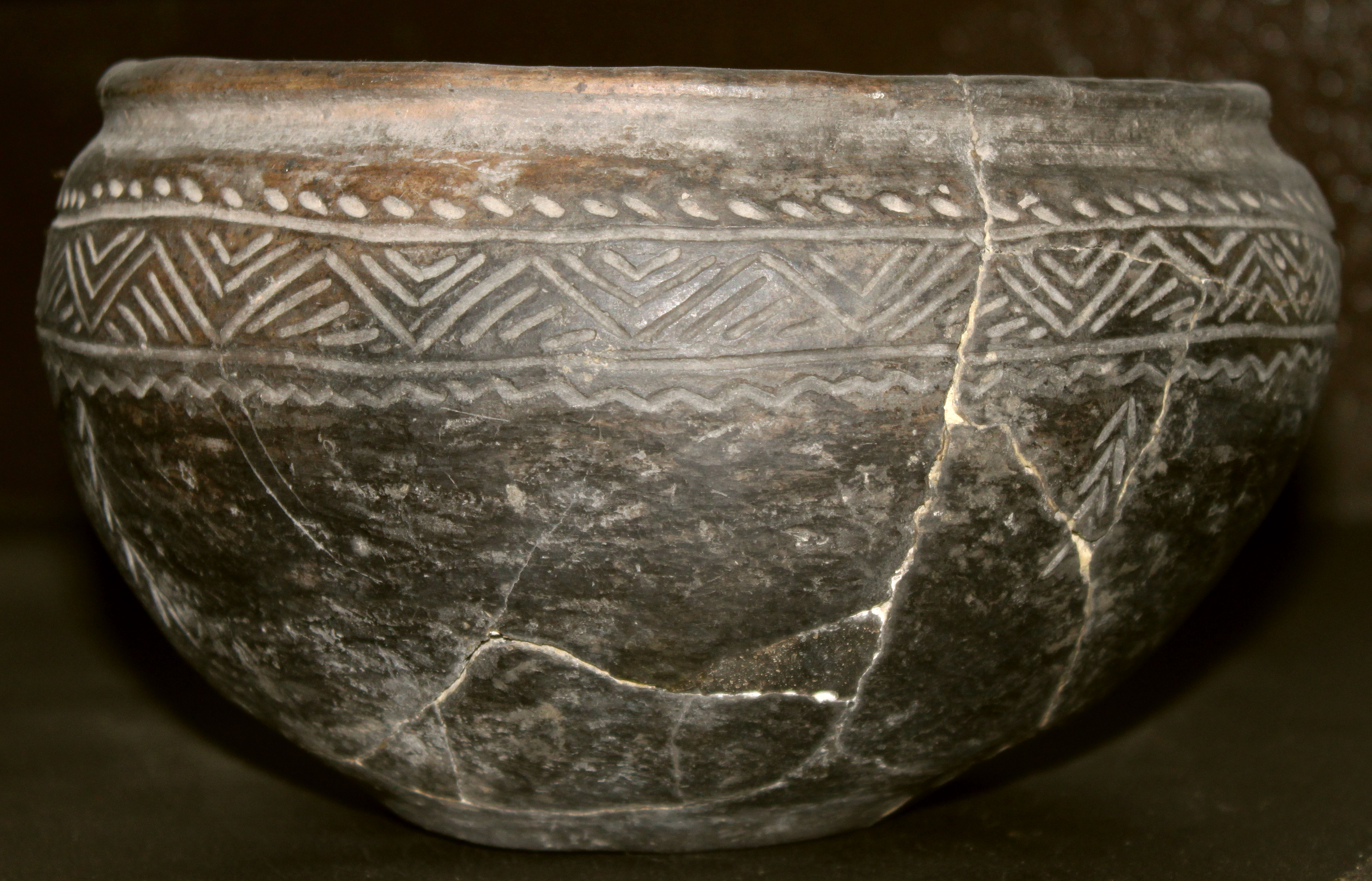
Pottery from Borsunlu mound, Nizami Ganjavi Ganja State History-Ethnography Museum

Borsunlu (also, Borsunlu Pervoye and Borsunly) is a village and municipality in the Tartar Rayon of Azerbaijan. It has a population of 1,093. The municipality consists of the villages of Borsunlu and Qırmızı-Saqqallar.

== Archaeology ==
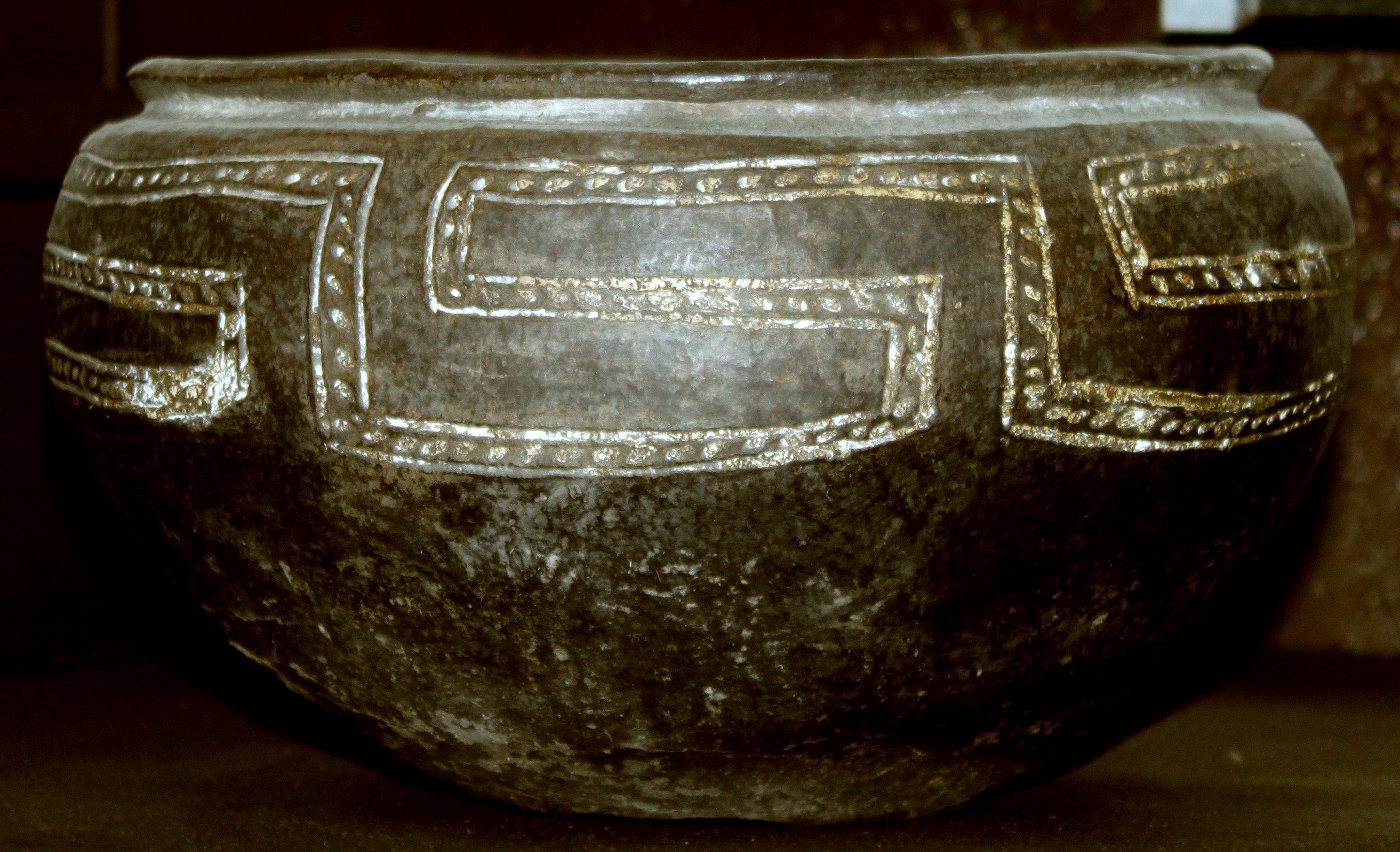
Pottery from Borsunlu mound, Nizami Ganjavi Ganja State History-Ethnography Museum

Near the village of Borsunlu, in the middle part of Incechay river, there are located Borsunlu mounds. The necropolis consisting of a group of mounds was studied by H. F. Jafarov. The mounds gathered in separate groups were divided into five types. Some of the mounds were surrounded by cromlechs. The grave chambers located under the mound were square-shaped and built of stone slabs fixed with mortar. Some tomb chambers have an entrance. Inhumation, cremation, and collective burials were characteristic of Borsunlu mounds.

The tomb chamber of mound No. 1 studied in the Borsunlu necropolis is circular, and the tomb chamber of mound No. 30 is quadrangular. Remains of human skeletons, black polished clay pots and other material and cultural remains were discovered from the graves.
