= Qaradağlı, Tartar =

Qaradağlı
- Municipality
- Location within Azerbaijan Location within Karabakh Economic Region
- Coordinates: 40°26′13″N 46°56′40″E
- Country: Azerbaijan
- Rayon: Tartar

Population
  - Total: 2,092
- Time zone: UTC+4 (AZT)
  - Summer (DST): UTC+5 (AZT)

Qaradağlı (also, Gharadaghli, Garadaghly, and Karadagly) is a village and municipality in the Tartar Rayon of Azerbaijan. It has a population of 2,092.
