= Behbud Khan Javanshir =

Azerbaijani politician (1878–1921)

Behbud Khan Javanshir Behbud xan Cavanşir
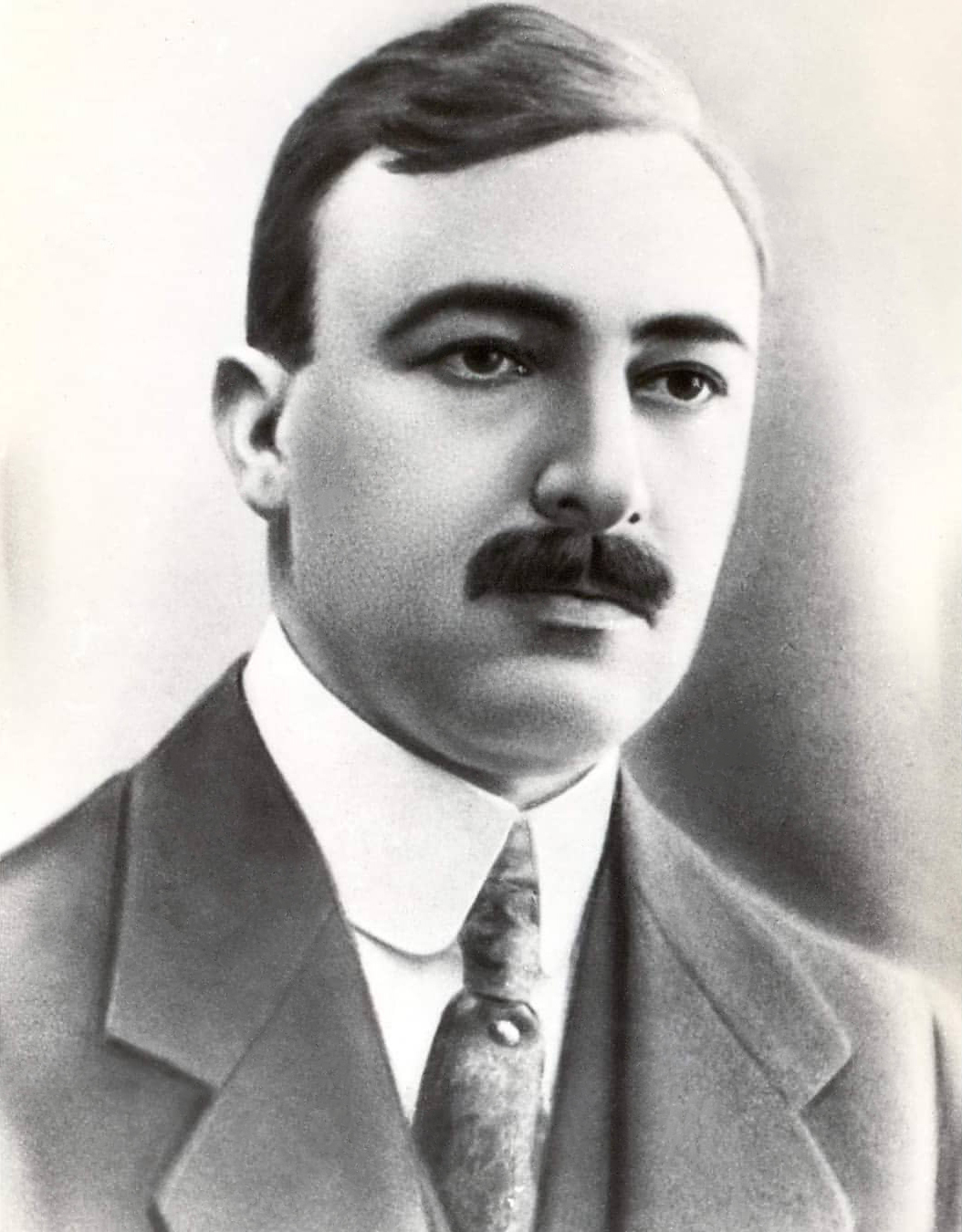

Minister of Internal Affairs of Azerbaijan Democratic Republic
- In office June 17, 1918 – December 26, 1918
- President: Alimardan Topchubashov (Chairman of Azerbaijani Parliament)
- Preceded by: Fatali Khan Khoyski
- Succeeded by: Khalil Bey Khasmammadov

Personal details
- Born: July 24, 1878 Azad Qaraqoyunlu, Javanshir Uyezd, Elisabethpol Governorate
- Died: July 18, 1921 (aged 42) Constantinople (now Istanbul), Ottoman Empire

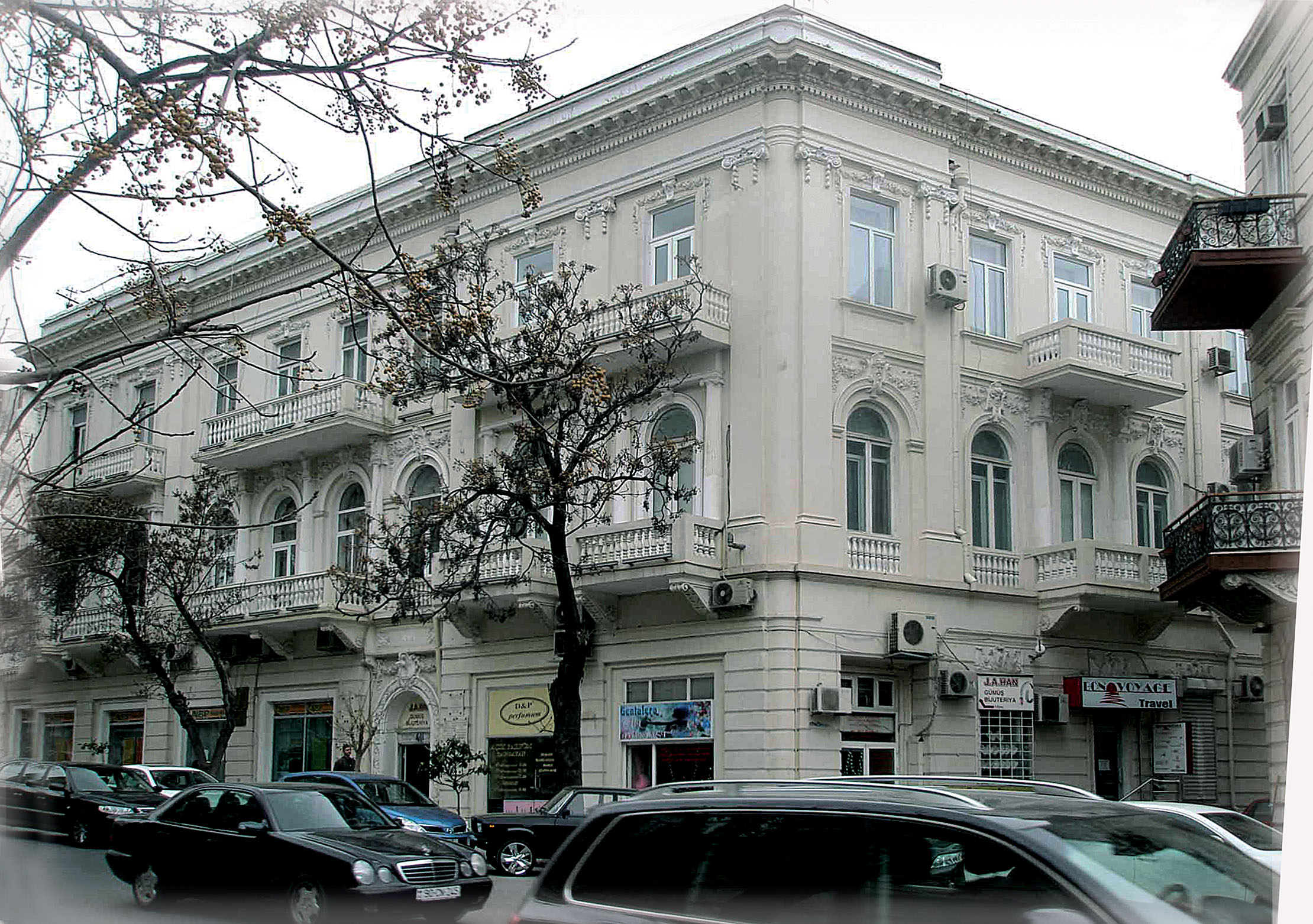
Javanshir's residence in Baku, early 1910s.

Behbud Khan Javanshir (Azerbaijani: Behbud xan Cavanşir Azad xan oğlu; 24 July 1878 – 18 July 1921) was an Azerbaijani politician, diplomat, Minister of Internal Affairs of Azerbaijan Democratic Republic and Deputy Minister of Trade and Industry.

== Early life ==
Behbud Khan Javanshir was born on July 24, 1878, in Azad Qaraqoyunlu village of Javanshir Uyezd of Elisabethpol Governorate. His father Azad Khan Javanshir was the great grandson of the founder of Karabakh Khanate Panah Ali Khan. From 1890 through 1898, he studied at Tiflis Realny School where he learned German. In 1902, Javanshir enrolled in Freiberg University of Mining and Technology, graduating cum laude in 1906. He then moved to London where he learned English.

Upon his return to Azerbaijan in 1907, Javanshir started working as a senior engineer in the oil industry. According to archival documents, he was a member of the anti-government organization Difai along with Ahmad Bey Aghayev, Garay Bey Garaybeyov, Mammad Hasan Hajinski, Isa Bey Ashurbeyov and Niftali Bey Behbudov.

While travelling to Germany, Javanshir brought German wheat to Karabakh which was acclimatized by local farmers and is used today. He was also the first person to bring an automobile to Karabakh region at a time when roads were built. After March massacres of 1918, Javanshir was a member of Azerbaijani-Armenian reconciliation commission.

== Political career ==
On June 17, 1918, Javanshir was appointed Minister of Internal Affairs of Azerbaijan Democratic Republic. On December 26, 1918, he was replaced by Khalil Bey Khasmammadov. Starting from October 6, 1918, as a deputy minister he was appointed acting Minister of Trade and Industry. Javanshir also served in the National Assembly of Azerbaijan.

After establishment of Soviet rule in Azerbaijan, with the assistance of Azerbaijani communist leader Nariman Narimanov, Javanshir was able to avoid imprisonment by the Bolsheviks and was assigned to work in Soviet oil fields in Baku. Due to his education in Germany, he was later assigned to represent the Soviet government first in Berlin, then from the summer of 1921 in Constantinople (now Istanbul), Ottoman Empire.

== Assassination ==
Javanshir was assassinated on July 18, 1921 in Constantinople, near Pera Palace Hotel. The assassination was carried out by an Armenian, Misak Torlakian, in retaliation for Javanshir's role in the massacre of Armenians in Baku. Torlakian was part of the Armenian Revolutionary Federation's "Operation Nemesis", and he was assisted by Ervand Fundukyan and (H)Arutiun (H)Arutunyan. A Dashnak officer who had known Javanshir from Baku recognized him. The plan was for Fundukyan and Arutunyan were to follow him, and Torlakian was to shoot him. Accompanied by his wife Tamara and brothers Jumshud and Surkhay, Javanshir was returning to the Pera Palace Hotel through the park after an evening at Tepebashi Theatre. Torlakian shot Javanshir with a Mauser pistol, once in the head and twice in the chest. Javanshir was later pronounced dead in the hospital. Torlakian was apprehended. Javanshir's wife Tamara wrote a Letter to the Editor of Tribune Libre in Constantinople describing the situation.

=== Court and sentencing ===
When questioned by the police, Torlakian said the assassination was justified because of the killing of Armenians in Baku. He was "sued" by the British Military Tribunal. Torlakian's defense attorneys and an Armenian neurologist who examined him in prison claimed he had epileptic seizures due to "the emotional crises to which he is subject" making him "not responsible for his actions". But a Turkish doctor claimed that he had neither epilepsy nor any mental disorders.

In October 1921, the British tribunal issued a guilty verdict but ruled that Torlakian was not responsible for his actions due to his epilepsy. Torlakian left for Greece, where he was released and left for the United States.

== See also ==
- Azerbaijani National Council
