= Misak Torlakian =

Armenian assassin (1889–1968)

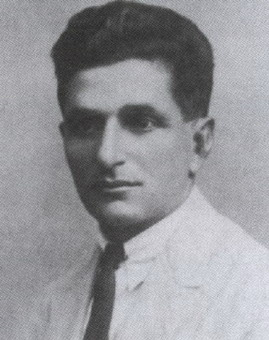
- Born: 1889; Trabizond, Ottoman Empire
- Died: November 12, 1968 (aged 78–79); Montebello, California
- Known for: Assassination of Behbud Khan Javanshir

Misak Torlakian (1889 – 12 November 1968) was the assassin of Behbud Khan Javanshir, former Minister of Interior of Azerbaijan, in 1921. Torlakian was admitted "guilty but not responsible" due to his mental condition by a British military tribunal in October 1921.

== Biography ==
Torlakian was born in 1889 in Trabizond, Ottoman Empire. Joining the Armenian Revolutionary Federation (ARF) at the age of 18, Torlakian succeeded in providing substantial amount of arms from a Turkish army depot in Trabizond for Armenian self-defense units. Tasked to obtain military intelligence during World War, Torlakian, by then a member of a Russian Army scout unit, provided valuable information about Turkish army dispositions. After the Russian withdrawal from the Turkish front in 1918, which allowed the Turks to advance unimpeded towards Yerevan, Torlakian joined Armenian army forces and participated with distinction in the battle of Bash Abaran, under the leadership of General Dro. The battle stopped the Turkish army from advancing any further. The hard-fought victory, along with others in Sardarabad and Karakilise, led to the establishment of the Democratic Republic of Armenia (1918–1920). In 1921, Torlakian was sent by the ARF to Constantinople (nowadays Istanbul) to execute Behbud Khan Javanshir, former Minister of Interior of Azerbaijan, who was assassinated outside the Pera Palace Hotel in Istanbul on July 18, 1921. This killing was part of the "Operation Nemesis" program carried out by the Armenian Revolutionary Federation after the Armenian genocide.

Torlakian was tried by a British military court on August 11, 1921. Misak Torlakian's trial is the twin of the trial of Soghomon Tehlirian. Both trials involved the murder of a government official and both perpetrators were found not guilty. History, theology, philosophy, physiology, psychology, and politics were invoked by both sides to sway the military judge in the case of Torlakian and the jury of peers in the case of Tehlirian. Thus, in addition to being landmark legal cases, these two trials reveal the prevailing mindsets and political strategies of Germans, Turks, Armenians and Azerbaijanis in the aftermath of World War I.

In October 1921, the British tribunal issued a guilty verdict but ruled that he was not responsible for his actions due to his epilepsy. Torlakian was expelled to Greece, where he was released and left for the United States.

He eventually settled in California, where he died in Montebello, California, in 1968. He is buried in the Evergreen Cemetery in East Los Angeles.

== See also ==
- Armenian genocide
