= Bəyimsarov =

- Municipality
- Location within Azerbaijan Location within Karabakh Economic Region
- Coordinates: 40°28′13″N 46°57′43″E
- Country: Azerbaijan
- Rayon: Tartar

Population
  - Total: 2,591
- Time zone: UTC+4 (AZT)
  - Summer (DST): UTC+5 (AZT)

Bəyimsarov (also, Begimsarov, Beyimsarov, and Sarov) is a village and municipality in the Tartar Rayon of Azerbaijan. It has a population of 2,591.
