= Umudlu, Agdam =

Umudlu
- Location within Azerbaijan Location within Karabakh Economic Region
- Coordinates: 40°13′30.5″N 46°57′34.7″E
- Country: Azerbaijan
- Rayon: Agdam
- Time zone: UTC+4 (AZT)
  - Summer (DST): UTC+5 (AZT)

Umudlu is a village in the Agdam District of Azerbaijan.
