= Kəngərli, Tartar =

Kəngərli
- Municipality
- Location within Azerbaijan Location within Karabakh Economic Region
- Coordinates: 40°25′18″N 46°57′44″E
- Country: Azerbaijan
- Rayon: Tartar

Population
  - Total: 1,361
- Time zone: UTC+4 (AZT)
  - Summer (DST): UTC+5 (AZT)

Kəngərli (also, Kənğərli, Kengerli, and Kengerly) is a village and municipality in the Tartar Rayon of Azerbaijan. It has a population of 1,361.
