= Evoğlu, Tartar =

Evoğlu
- Municipality
- Location within Azerbaijan Location within Karabakh Economic Region
- Coordinates: 40°18′03″N 47°03′23″E
- Country: Azerbaijan
- Rayon: Tartar

Population
  - Total: 1,957
- Time zone: UTC+4 (AZT)
  - Summer (DST): UTC+5 (AZT)

Evoğlu is a village and municipality in the Tartar Rayon of Azerbaijan. It has a population of 1,957.
