= Düyərli, Tartar =

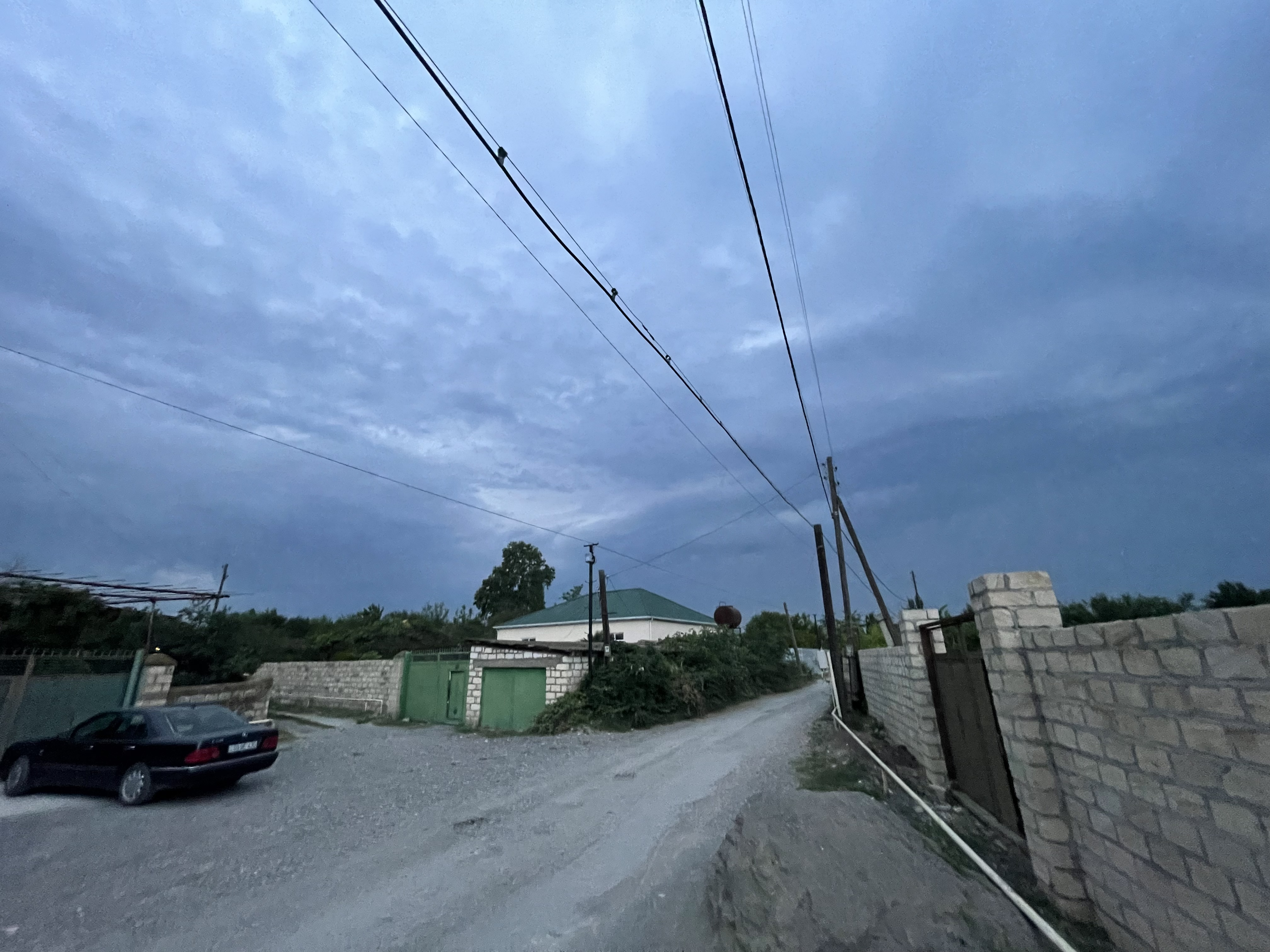
Duyarli Terter

Düyərli is a village and municipality in the Tartar Rayon of Azerbaijan. It has a population of 718.
