= İsmayılbəyli, Agdam =

Ismayilbeyli
- Azerbaijani: İsmayılbəyli
- Location within Azerbaijan Location within Karabakh Economic Region
- Coordinates: 39°56′12″N 47°00′45″E
- Country: Azerbaijan
- District: Aghdam
- Time zone: UTC+4 (AZT)
  - Summer (DST): UTC+5 (AZT)

İsmayılbəyli (Ismayilbeyli) is a village in the Aghdam District of Azerbaijan.
