= Nushaba Alasgarly =

Azerbaijani singer and actress

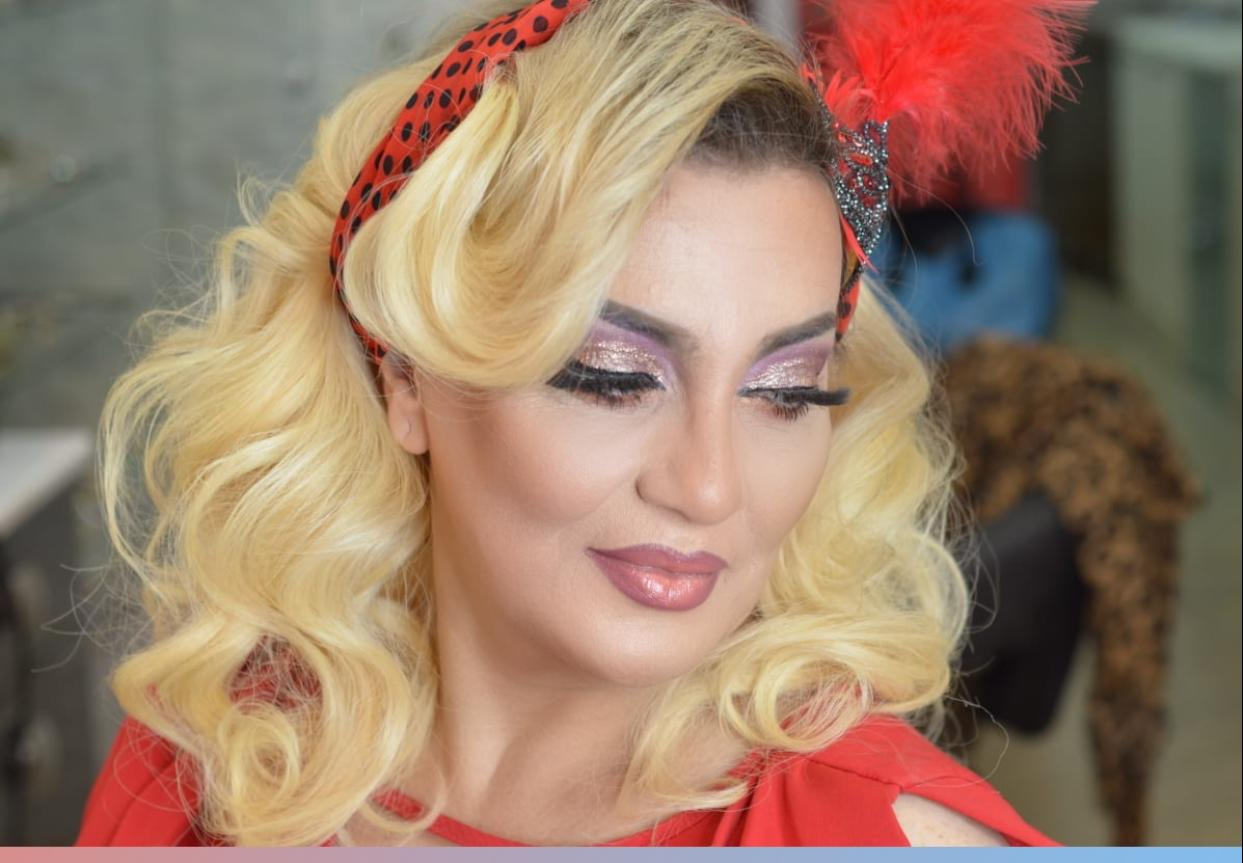

Background information
- Birth name: Nüşabə Ələsgər qızı Hümmətova
- Born: 21 December 1967 (age 57) Nukha, Azerbaijan SSR, USSR
- Origin: Azerbaijani
- Occupation(s): singer, actress
- Citizenship: Soviet Union; Azerbaijan
- Education: Azerbaijan State Conservatory named after Uzeyir Hajibeyov
- Awards: Honored Artist of the Republic of Azerbaijan

İnstagram Alasgar gizi Hummatova (Azerbaijani: Nüşabə Ələsgər qızı Hümmətova, born 21 December 1967) is an Azerbaijani singer, actress, PhD in art history, and Honored Artist of the Republic of Azerbaijan.

== Biography ==
Nushaba Alasgarly was born on 21 December 1967 in Nukha. She went to the first grade in 1974, but in 1976 her family moved to Sumgayit. She continued her education at school No. 26 in Sumgayit and at the same time studied piano at music school No. 3. In 1982, N. Alasgarly entered the choir conducting department of the Music College named after Soltan Hajibeyov. She graduated from technical school in 1986 and in the same year entered the faculty of choir conducting of the Azerbaijan State Conservatory named after Uzeyir Hajibeyov.

She got married in 1995 and has two children.

== Career ==
Nushaba Alasgarly joined Azerbaijan State Song and Dance Ensemble in 1990 and worked in the choir there until 1995. While working in this ensemble, both as a member of the choir and as a soloist, she gave concerts in many foreign countries – Turkey, Egypt, Norway, Sweden, Denmark, Germany. While working in the Song and Dance Ensemble, she also began her solo career. She recorded a number of songs with the team led by Rafig Babayev. Nushaba Alasgarly also worked in "Koroghlu" instrumental ensemble with the invitation of the head of the ensemble Etibar Gasimov and gave a concert for the first time on the stage of the Azerbaijan State Academic Philharmonic Hall in 1991.

Performed with Niyameddin Musayev's band "Roya" in Sri Lanka and other stages. She was first aired in 1994 as a solo singer with Jahangir Jahangirov's song "Ay giz" at "New Year" night shot by AzTV Youth Editorial Office. In 1998, she started working as a soloist at the Azerbaijan Television and Radio Company.

Nushaba Alasgarly, who started her career as a teacher at the Azerbaijan State University of Culture and Arts in 2011, defended her dissertation "Stylistic features of Shafiga Akhundova's work" in 2018 and received the degree of Doctor of Philosophy in Art History. She is currently a senior lecturer at the Azerbaijan State University of Culture and Arts. In 1999, she was the host of the breakfast section on the morning program on AzTV.

== Awards ==
- Honored Artist of the Republic of Azerbaijan – 10 December 2013

== Filmography ==
- "Mother-in-law" operation
- Burned bridges
- Companions
- Be a man! 2
