= Hüseynli =

- Municipality
- Azerbaijani: Hüsəynli
- Location within Azerbaijan Location within Karabakh Economic Region
- Coordinates: 40°12′47″N 47°04′40″E
- Country: Azerbaijan
- District: Tartar

Population
  - Total: 2,093
- Time zone: UTC+4 (AZT)
  - Summer (DST): UTC+5 (AZT)

Hüseynli (also, Hüsənli, Hiisənli, Husanli, Gusanly, and Guseynli) is a village and municipality in the Tartar District of Azerbaijan. It has a population of 2,093.
