= Ələsgərli, Füzuli =

Ələsgərli
- Location within Azerbaijan Location within Karabakh Economic Region
- Coordinates: 39°35′41″N 47°12′30″E
- Country: Azerbaijan
- District: Fuzuli
- Time zone: UTC+4 (AZT)

Ələsgərli (also, Ələskərli, Alasgarli, Aleskerli and Aleskerly) is a ghost village on the river Zəyəmçay in the Fuzuli District of Azerbaijan. It is set on undulating land, some 7 km due east of Fuzuli town, backed by more substantial mountain foothills. Video footage released after its 2020 recapture by Azerbaijani forces show an intact metalled road running through an otherwise devastated settlement of widely spaced farmhouses that have long ago fallen into crumbling ruins.

== History ==
The village was originally known as Badakand meaning "village in the hay". In 1990, it was renamed Alasgarli in honor of folk-musician Ashig Alasgar, the name meaning "descendants of Alasgar". The village and whole surrounding region was occupied by Armenian forces in 1993 but liberated on 9 November 2020.
