= Ələsgərli, Shamkir =

Ələsgərli
- Municipality
- Location within Azerbaijan
- Coordinates: 40°49′06″N 45°46′16″E
- Country: Azerbaijan
- Rayon: Shamkir

Population
  - Total: 880
- Time zone: UTC+4 (AZT)
  - Summer (DST): UTC+5 (AZT)

Ələsgərli is a village and municipality in the Shamkir Rayon of Azerbaijan. It has a population of 880. The municipality consists of the villages of Ələsgərli and Kamandar. Until 1990, just before Azerbaijan's independence, the village was known officially as Badakənd, and more colloquially as Bado.
