= İsmayılbəyli, Tartar =

İsmayılbəyli
- Municipality
- Location within Azerbaijan Location within Karabakh Economic Region
- Coordinates: 40°18′26″N 47°00′57″E
- Country: Azerbaijan
- Rayon: Tartar
- Elevation: 146 m (479 ft)

Population
  - Total: 1,405
- Time zone: UTC+4 (AZT)
  - Summer (DST): UTC+5 (AZT)

İsmayılbəyli (also, Ismailbeyli) is a village and municipality in the Tartar Rayon of Azerbaijan. It has a population of 1,405.
