= Qazyan, Tartar =

Qazyan
- Municipality
- Location within Azerbaijan Location within Karabakh Economic Region
- Coordinates: 40°14′23″N 47°01′42″E
- Country: Azerbaijan
- Rayon: Tartar

Population
  - Total: 784
- Time zone: UTC+4 (AZT)
  - Summer (DST): UTC+5 (AZT)

Qazyan (also, Kaz’yan) is a village and municipality in the Tartar Rayon of Azerbaijan. It has a population of 784.
