= Aşağı Qapanlı =

Coordinates: 40.276667°N 47.058611°E

Aşağı Qapanlı, Qapanlı (?-2015) is a village in the municipality of Azad Qaraqoyunlu in the Tartar Rayon of Azerbaijan.
