= Rəcəbli, Jalilabad =

Radzhabli
- Location within Azerbaijan
- Coordinates: 39°13′N 48°21′E
- Country: Azerbaijan
- Rayon: Jalilabad
- Time zone: UTC+4 (AZT)
  - Summer (DST): UTC+5 (AZT)

Radzhabli is a village in the Jalilabad Rayon of Azerbaijan.
