= Tartar (city) =

Tərtər
- Location within Azerbaijan Location within Karabakh Economic Region
- Coordinates: 40°20′42″N 46°55′44″E
- Country: Azerbaijan
- District: Tartar
- Established: 1940

Area
  - Total: 1,301.4 km^{2} (502.5 sq mi)
- Elevation: 255 m (837 ft)

Population (2010)
  - Total: 19,419
- Time zone: UTC+4 (AZT)
- Area code: +994 246

Tartar city

Museum of State Symbols in Tartar city

Tartar (Azerbaijani: Tərtər) is a city in and the capital of the Tartar District of Azerbaijan.

Its population is approximately 18,200, as of 2008. During the Russian Empire, the city was the administrative center of the Jevanshir Uyezd of the Elisabethpol Governorate. The town was subjected to bombardment by the Armenian forces in the 2020 Nagorno-Karabakh war.

== History ==
From 1947 to 1949, Tartar had the status of an urban-type settlement, which was then transformed into the city of Mirbashir, named after the Azerbaijani Soviet party leader Mirbashir Gasimov. In 1963, the Tartar district was abolished and its territory was merged into Barda District, alongside the city of Tartar. It became independent again in 1965. On 7 February 1991, the historical name of the town, Tartar, was restored.

In 1994, during the First Nagorno-Karabakh War, Armenian armed forces launched a large-scale attack on the city. Azerbaijani forces managed to hold their positions in Tartar until the ceasefire was established, following which the city came only a few kilometers from the line of contact.

On 27 September 2020, the Second Nagorno-Karabakh War began. From 30 September to the end of the war, the city of Tartar was subjected to a bombardment from the Armenian side. According to Aide to the President of Azerbaijan, Hikmet Hajiyev, over 2,000 shells were fired at the city on 2 October alone.

On 8 July 2022, the master plan for the development of the city until 2038 was approved.

== Demographics ==
Tartar Olympic Sports Complex

According to the 1897 census, Tartar—mentioned as Terter (Russian: Тертеръ)—had a population of 752 consisting of 565 Shia Tatars and 122 Armenian Apostolics. The village had 496 men and 256 women.

== See also ==
- Terter operation
