= Cəmilli, Tartar =

Cəmilli
- Municipality
- Location within Azerbaijan Location within Karabakh Economic Region
- Coordinates: 40°24′07″N 46°55′02″E
- Country: Azerbaijan
- Rayon: Tartar

Population
  - Total: 1,520
- Time zone: UTC+4 (AZT)
  - Summer (DST): UTC+5 (AZT)

Cəmilli (also, Dzhamilli and Dzhamily) is a village and municipality in the Tartar Rayon of Azerbaijan. It has a population of 1,520.
