= Azad Qaraqoyunlu =

- Municipality
- Location within Azerbaijan Location within Karabakh Economic Region
- Coordinates: 40°16′36″N 47°03′31″E
- Country: Azerbaijan
- Rayon: Tartar

Population
  - Total: 2,487
- Time zone: UTC+4 (AZT)
  - Summer (DST): UTC+5 (AZT)

Azad Qaraqoyunlu (also, Azadkarakoyunlu) is a town and municipality in the Tartar Rayon of Azerbaijan. It has a population of 2,487. The municipality consists of the villages of Azad Qaraqoyunlu, Aşağı Qapanlı, and İlxıçılar.

== Notable natives ==
- Behbud Khan Javanshir — Minister of Internal Affairs of the Azerbaijan Democratic Republic (1918).
