= Alışarlı =

Human settlement in Azerbaijan

Coordinates: 40°20′19″N 47°03′03″E

Alışarlı (known as Qapanlı until 2015) is a village in the municipality of İrəvanlı in the Tartar Rayon of Azerbaijan.
