= Seydimli =

- Municipality
- Location within Azerbaijan Location within Karabakh Economic Region
- Coordinates: 40°22′06″N 46°56′41″E
- Country: Azerbaijan
- Rayon: Tartar

Population
  - Total: 2,495
- Time zone: UTC+4 (AZT)
  - Summer (DST): UTC+5 (AZT)

Seydimli (also, Seyidimli and Seidimli) is a village and municipality in the Tartar Rayon of Azerbaijan. It has a population of 2,495.
