= Soyulan =

- Municipality
- Location within Azerbaijan Location within Karabakh Economic Region
- Coordinates: 40°20′08″N 47°01′39″E
- Country: Azerbaijan
- Rayon: Tartar

Population
  - Total: 431
- Time zone: UTC+4 (AZT)
  - Summer (DST): UTC+5 (AZT)

Soyulan (also, Söylən) is a village and municipality in the Tartar Rayon of Azerbaijan. It has a population of 431.
