= Qaraağacı =

- Municipality
- Location within Azerbaijan Location within Karabakh Economic Region
- Coordinates: 40°17′35″N 46°59′02″E
- Country: Azerbaijan
- Rayon: Tartar
- Elevation: 170 m (560 ft)

Population
  - Total: 1,302
- Time zone: UTC+4 (AZT)
  - Summer (DST): UTC+5 (AZT)

Qaraağacı (also, Qarağacı, Qaraağaçı, Gharaaghach’i, Karaagadzhi, and Karaagadzhy) is a village and municipality in the Tartar Rayon of Azerbaijan. It has a population of 1,302.
