= Səhləbad =

- Municipality
- Location within Azerbaijan Location within Karabakh Economic Region
- Coordinates: 40°19′35″N 46°56′56″E
- Country: Azerbaijan
- District: Tartar

Population
  - Total: 2,074
- Time zone: UTC+4 (AZT)
  - Summer (DST): UTC+5 (AZT)

Səhləbad (Sahlabad) is a village and municipality in the Tartar District of Azerbaijan. It has a population of 2,075.
