= Əskipara, Tartar =

Eskipara
- Municipality
- Azerbaijani: Əskipara
- Location within Azerbaijan
- Coordinates: 40°18′N 46°58′E
- Country: Azerbaijan
- District: Tartar

Population
  - Total: 1,029
- Time zone: UTC+4 (AZT)
  - Summer (DST): UTC+5 (AZT)

Əskipara (Eskipara) is a village and municipality in the Tartar District of Azerbaijan. It has a population of 1,029.

On 11 May 2016 the Armenian military reportedly bombed the territory of Eskipara with 122-mm calibre white phosphorus munitions prohibited by the Convention on Certain Conventional Weapons. On the same day military attaches from 13 countries reviewed the area where the white phosphorus munition had been fired.
