= Sarıcallı, Jabrayil =

Saryjally
- Azerbaijani: Sarıcallı
- Location within Azerbaijan
- Coordinates: 39°17′44″N 47°05′50″E
- Country: Azerbaijan
- District: Jabrayil

Population
  - Total: 0
- Time zone: UTC+4 (AZT)
  - Summer (DST): UTC+5 (AZT)

Sarıcallı (also, Sarıcalı and Saryjally) is a village in the Shukurbeyli administrative unit of Jabrayil district, Azerbaijan, located on Goyana steppe, 12 km south of the city of Jabrayil.

== Etymology ==
The name comes from one branch of the Bahmanly tribe called the Saryjally.

== History ==
During the years of the Russian Empire, the village of Saryjally was part of Jabrayil district, Elizavetpol province.

During the Soviet years, the village was part of Jabrayil district, Azerbaijan SSR. The village was captured by Armenian forces in the First Karabakh War.

On 5 October 2020, Azerbaijani President Ilham Aliyev announced that the Azerbaijani Army liberated and took control over the village of Saryjally, Jabrayil district.

== Economy ==
The main branch of economy was the animal husbandry.

== Population ==
According to the “Code of statistical data of the Transcaucasian region population, extracted from the family lists of 1886”, in the village of Saryjally, Soltanly rural district, Jabrayil district, there were 73 dym where lived 326 Azerbaijanis (listed as “Tatars”), who were Shiites by religion and peasants.

According to the “Caucasian Calendar” for 1912, 398 people lived in the village of Saryjally, Karyagin district, mostly Azerbaijanis, indicated in the calendar as “Tatars”.
