= Ələsgərli, Tartar =

Village in Tartar, Azerbaijan

Coordinates: 40.3406°N 46.9791°E

Ələsgərli is a village and municipality (Azerbaijani: kǝnd iəd [kǝnd inzibati ərazi dairəsi]) in the Tartar District of Azerbaijan, including not only the village of Ələsgərli itself but also those of Bayandur and Yenikǝnd. It is in the plain of Karabakh. Under the Soviet regime it was known as Leninabad; it was renamed in 1999. It has a population of 1,105.
