= Yuxarı Qapanlı =

Village and municipality in Azerbaijan

Qapanlı is a village and municipality in the Tartar District of Azerbaijan.
