= Tartar District =

District in western Azerbaijan

Coordinates: 40°20′N 46°55′E

- District
- Map of Azerbaijan showing Tartar District
- Country: Azerbaijan
- Region: Karabakh
- Established: 27 January 1934
- Capital: Tartar
- Settlements: 77

Government
  - Governor: Mustagim Mammadov

Area
  - Total: 960 km^{2} (370 sq mi)

Population (2020)
  - Total: 104,700
  - Density: 110/km^{2} (280/sq mi)
- Time zone: UTC+4 (AZT)
- Postal code: 5900
- Website: terter-ih.gov.az

Tartar District (Azerbaijani: Tərtər rayonu) is one of the 66 districts of Azerbaijan. It is located in the west of the country and belongs to the Karabakh Economic Region. The district borders the districts of Kalbajar, Goranboy, Yevlakh, Barda, and Aghdam. Its capital and largest city is Tartar. As of 2020, the district had a nominal population of 104,700.

== History ==
The district was expanded to include the eastern part of the Mardakert District of Nagorno-Karabakh Autonomous Oblast following its abolishment in 1992. However, only a small part of it remained under the control of Azerbaijan following the First Nagorno-Karabakh War. Azerbaijan recaptured the villages of Talish and Madagiz in Tartar during the 2020 Nagorno-Karabakh war and the rest of the district was put under the control of Russian peacekeepers. Mardakert District was re-established as the Aghdara District in 2023, and the Tartar District was subsequently returned to its pre-1992 size.

Some Azerbaijani IDPs from Nagorno Karabakh and the surrounding occupied regions were moved into tent settlements in the district following the First Nagorno-Karabakh war. Most of them now live in new houses built by the government.

The district became the center of the notorious Tartar treason case, as mass torture took place in the old administrative building of the district, where soldiers were taken and tortured during interrogations.

== Subdivisions ==
The Tartar District contains one city and 35 village municipalities or kǝnd iǝd (for inzibati ərazi dairəsi - administrative territory circle), the Azerbaijani term for a local government administrative unit.

- Tartar city municipality (Tərtər şəhər iəd)

Tartar (city)

- Azad Qaraqoyunlu village municipality (Azad Qaraqoyunlu kənd iəd)

Azad Qaraqoyunlu (village)
- Aşağı Qapanlı
- İlxıçılar

- Bəyimsarov village municipality (Bəyimsarov kənd iəd)

Bəyimsarov (village)

- Borsunlu village municipality (Borsunlu kənd iəd)

Borsunlu (village)
- Qırmızı Saqqallar

- Buruc village municipality (Buruc kənd iəd)

Buruc
- Güləbatlı

- Cəmilli village municipality (Cəmilli kənd iəd)

Cəmilli (village)
- Bala Kəngərli

- Dəmirçilər village municipality (Dəmirçilər kənd iəd)

Dəmirçilər (village)
- Ağkənd

- Düyərli village municipality (Düyərli kənd iəd)

Düyərli (village)
- Yuxarı Sarıcalı

- Evoğlu village municipality (Evoğlu kənd iəd)

Evoğlu (village)

- Ələsgərli village municipality (Ələsgərli kənd iəd)

Ələsgərli (village)
- Bayandur
- Yenikənd

- Əskipara village municipality (Əskipara kənd iəd)

Əskipara (village)

- Hacıqərvənd village municipality (Hacıqərvənd kənd iəd)

Hacıqərvənd (village)

- Hüsənli village municipality (Hüsənli kənd iəd)

Hüsənli (village)

- Xoruzlu village municipality (Xoruzlu kənd iəd)

Xoruzlu (village)

- İrəvanlı village municipality (İrəvanlı kənd iəd)

İrəvanlı (village)

- İsmayılbəyli village municipality (İsmayılbəyli kənd iəd)

İsmayılbəyli (village)

- Kəbirli village municipality (Kəbirli kənd iəd)

Kəbirli (village)
- Bayandurlu

- Kəngərli village municipality (Kəngərli kənd iəd)

Kəngərli (village)

- Köçərli village municipality (Köçərli kənd iəd)

Köçərli (village)

- Qaraağacı village municipality (Qaraağacı kənd iəd)

Qaraağacı (village)
- Qapanlı
- Yuxarı Qaradağlı

- Qaradağlı village municipality (Qaradağlı kənd iəd)

Qaradağlı (village)
- Təzəkənd

- Qaynaq village municipality (Qaynaq kənd iəd)

Qaynaq (village)

- Mamırlı village municipality (Mamırlı kənd iəd)

Mamırlı (village)
- Poladlı

- Sarıcalı village municipality (Sarıcalı kənd iəd)

Sarıcalı (village)
- Zolgəran

- Sarov village municipality (Sarov kənd iəd)

Sarov (village)
- Bildirçinli
- Kövdadıq
- Rəcəbli
- Umudlu

- Seydimli village municipality (Seydimli kənd iəd)

Seydimli (village)

- Səhləbad village municipality (Səhləbad kənd iəd)

Səhləbad (village)

- Soyulan village municipality (Soyulan kənd iəd)

Soyulan (village)
- Alışarlı
- Hacallı

- Yuxarı Qapanlı village municipality (Yuxarı Qapanlı kənd iəd)

Yuxarı Qapanlı (village)
- Qazyan

== See also ==
- Bombardment of Tartar
