= War crimes in the Second Nagorno-Karabakh War =

Amnesty International stated that both Azerbaijani and Armenian forces committed war crimes during Second Nagorno-Karabakh War, and called on the governments of Armenia and Azerbaijan to immediately conduct independent, impartial investigations, identify all those responsible, and bring them to justice. UN Secretary-General António Guterres stated that "indiscriminate attacks on populated areas anywhere, including in Stepanakert, Ganja and other localities in and around the immediate Nagorno-Karabakh zone of conflict, were totally unacceptable". Columbia University's Institute for the Study of Human Rights recognized that violent conflict affected all sides in the conflict but distinguished "the collateral damage of Azerbaijanis" from "the policy of atrocities such as mutilations and beheadings committed by Azerbaijani forces and their proxies in Artsakh." Azerbaijan started an investigation on war crimes by Azerbaijani servicemen in November and as of 14 December 2020, has arrested four of its servicemen.

== Armenian war crimes ==
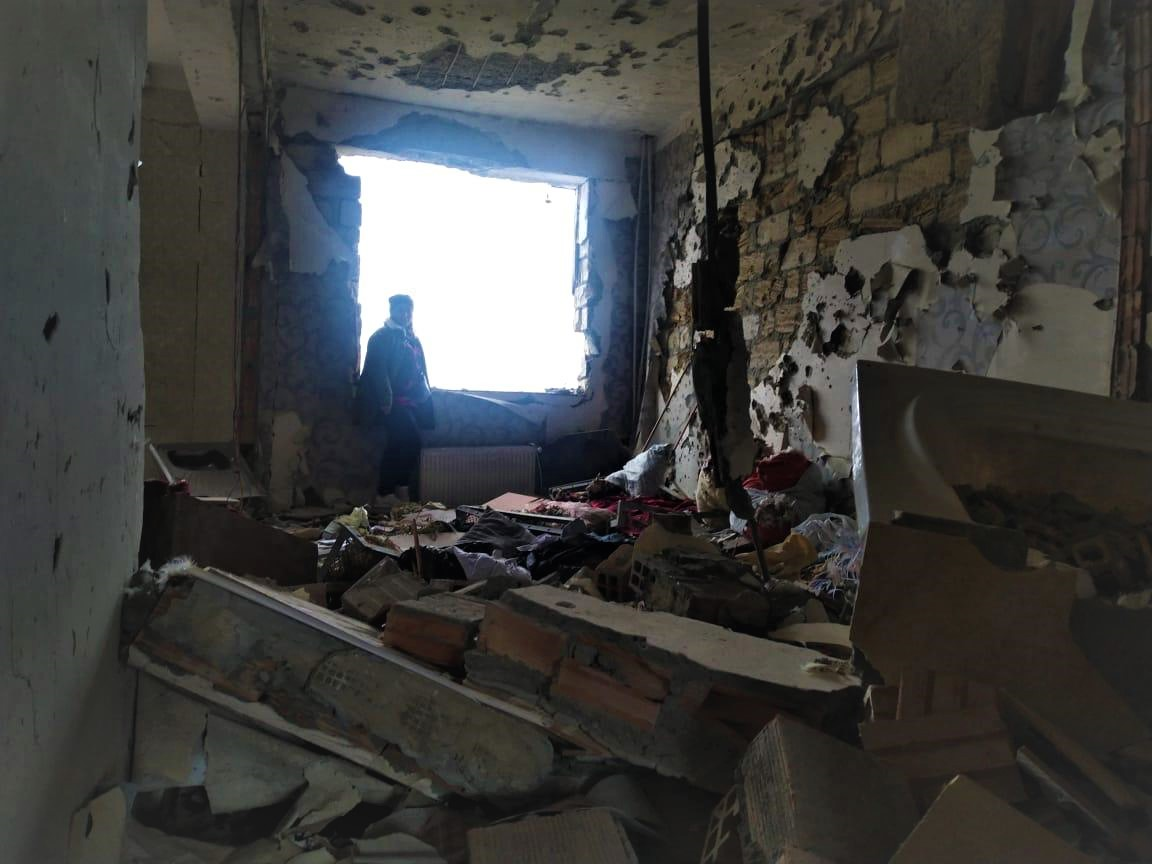
The Armenian forces had shelled the town of Shikharkh, damaging apartments and schools. The town was built for the Azerbaijani refugees of the First Nagorno-Karabakh war.

Armenia shelled several Azerbaijani cities outside of the conflict zone, most frequently Tartar, Beylagan and Barda. Artillery strikes reported by Azerbaijani authorities included an attack on Beylagan on 4 October, killing two civilians and injuring 2 others, Goranboy on 8 October killing a civilian, Hadrut on 10 October, seriously injuring a medical worker, Fuzuli on 20 October, resulting in one civilian death and six injuries, Tartar on 20 October, resulting in two civilian deaths and one civilian injury and Tartar on 10 November, resulting in one civilian injury. By 9 November, there had been more than 93 civilian deaths and 416 civilian injuries in areas of Azerbaijan outside of the war zone.

Human Rights Watch reported that on 27 September, the Armenian forces had launched an artillery attack on Qaşaltı of Goranboy District, killing five members of the Gurbanov family, and damaged several homes. Human Rights Watch examined the severely damaged house and found several munition remnants in the courtyard that were consistent with fragments of large-caliber artillery. It also reported that the Armenian forces struck Hacıməmmədli of Aghdam District on 1 October, in an agricultural area, at around 11:00, killing two civilians. HRW stated that they had found no evident military objectives during their visit to the village. HRW also reported that the Armenian forces had launched an artillery attack on 4 October in Tap Qaraqoyunlu of Goranboy District at about 16:30, wounding a civilian. Then, on 5 October, Human Rights Watch reported that the Armenian forces fired a munition that landed in a field about 500 meters from Babı of Fuzuli District. The Azerbaijani authorities stated that they had identified the munition as a Scud-B ballistic missile and measured the crater as 15 meters in diameter.

Armenian forces heavily shelled the district of Tartar during the war, starting from 28 September. The bombardment caused widespread destruction and many civilian deaths. Thousands of people became refugees, making the city of Tartar a ghost town, and fled to neighbouring cities such as Barda. The Azerbaijani authorities stated that the Armenian forces had fired 15,500 shells on the territory of Tartar District until 29 October, with over 2,000 shells being fired upon Tartar in some days. Official Azerbaijani figures show that over a thousand civilian objects, including schools, hospitals, and government buildings were either damaged or destroyed during the bombardment. Human Rights Watch confirmed many of the targeted attacks on civilians and civilian objects, such as kindergartens and hospitals, by the Armenian forces. It also stated that the Armenian military forces had carried out unlawfully indiscriminate rocket and missile strikes on the Azerbaijani territories, and that such indiscriminate attacks were war crimes. The constant bombardment of the city prompted Azerbaijani officials to label Tartar as the Stalingrad of Azerbaijan, and the President of Azerbaijan, Ilham Aliyev, accused Armenia of trying to turn Tartar to the next Aghdam, also referred to as the Hiroshima of the Caucasus by the locals. Turkey also condemned the Armenian shelling of a cemetery in Tartar during a funeral ceremony, which foreign journalists at scene and Human Rights Watch confirmed. On 29 October, the head of the Tartar District Executive Power, Mustagim Mammadov, stated that during the war, 17 civilians killed, and 61 people injured in Tartar District as a result of the bombardment in Tartar. According to him, in total, about 1,200 people suffered from the bombardment. The Azerbaijani authorities reported two more civilian injuries later on.

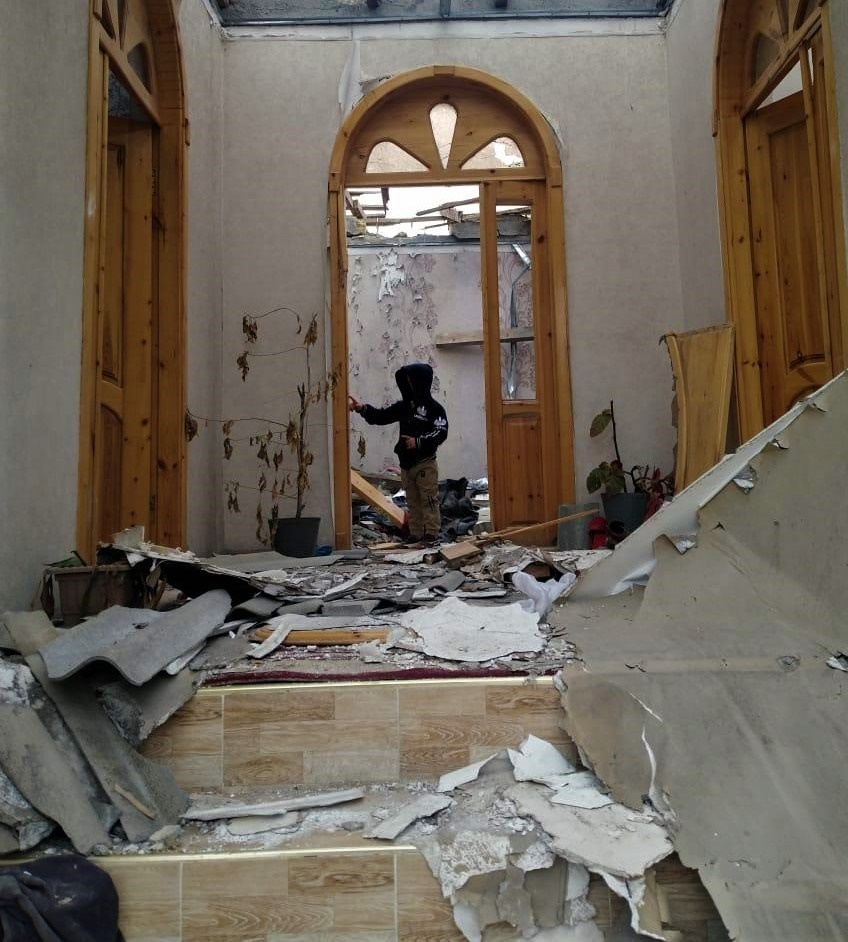
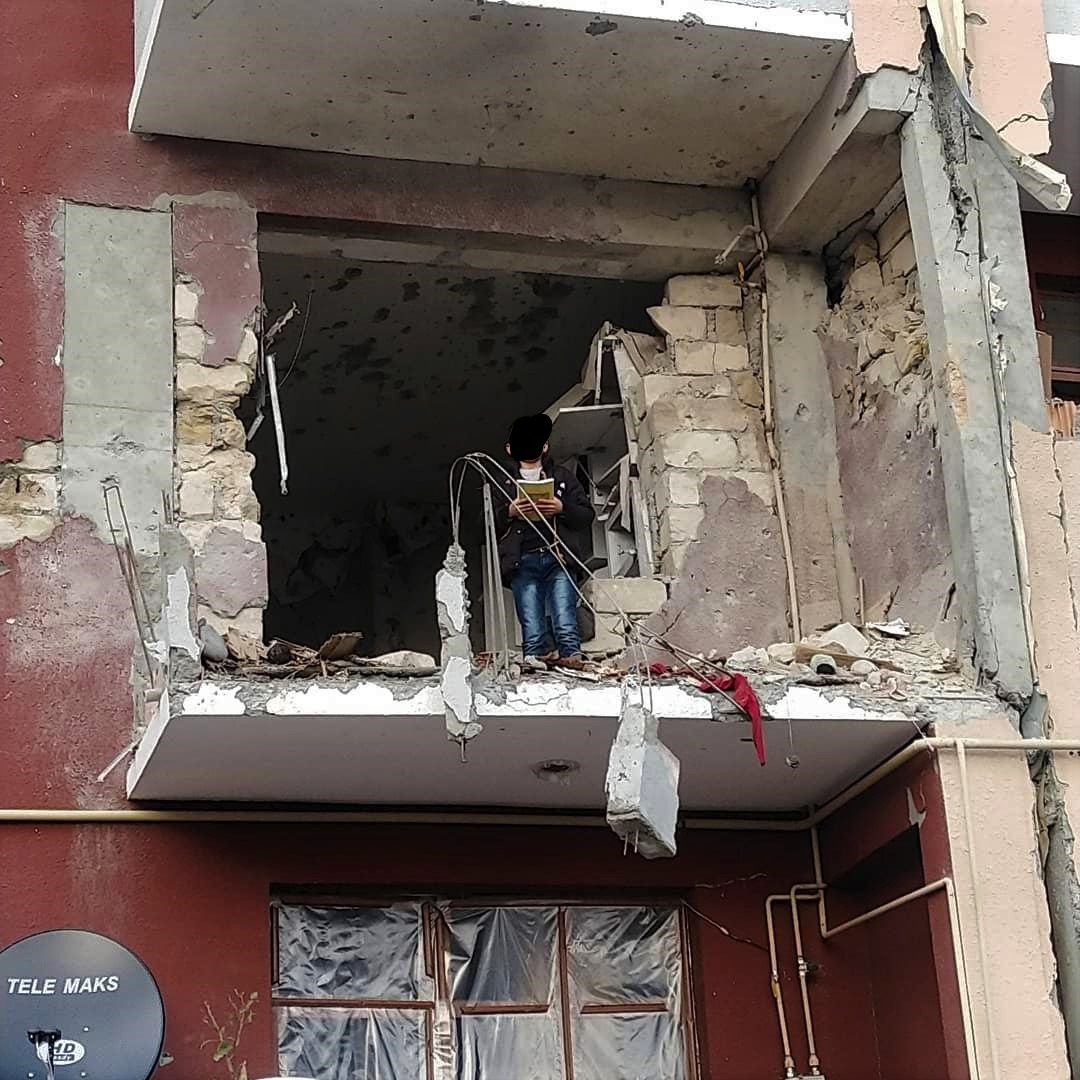
Destruction in Tartar after the Armenian bombardment.

External videos
- Azerbaijan: footage shows shelling in city of Ganja on YouTube

Between 4 and 17 October, four separate missile attacks on the city of Ganja killed 32 civilians, including a 13-year-old Russian citizen, and injured 125 with women and children among the victims. The attacks were condemned by the European Union, and Azerbaijani authorities accused the Armenian Armed Forces of "committing war crimes through the firing of ballistic missiles at civilian settlements", calling the third attack "an act of genocide". Armenia denied responsibility for the attacks. The Artsakh Defence Army confirmed responsibility for the first attack but denied targeting residential areas, claiming that it had fired at military targets, especially Ganja International Airport. Subsequently, both a correspondent reporting from the scene for a Russian media outlet and the airport director denied that the airport had been hit, while a BBC News journalist, Orla Guerin, visited the scene and found no evidence of any military target there.

On 15 October, the Armenian forces shelled a cemetery 400 metres (1,300 ft) north of the city of Tartar during a funeral ceremony, killing 4 civilians and injuring 4 more. This was confirmed by local journalists, TV Rain, and the Human Rights Watch. The Presidential Administration of Azerbaijan also confirmed that the cemetery was shelled in the morning.

On 25 October, a video emerged online of an Armenian teenager in civilian clothing helping soldiers fire artillery on Azerbaijani positions. Azerbaijan subsequently accused Armenia of using child soldiers. One day later, the Artsakh ombudsman released a statement claiming that the boy in the video was 16, was not directly engaged in military actions and was working with his father.

The Human Rights Watch reported that on 28 October, at about 17:00, the Armenian forces fired a munition on Tap Qaraqoyunlu of Goranboy District that produced fragmentation and killed a civilian.

The Artsakh Defence Army hit the Azerbaijani town of Barda with missiles twice on 27 and 28 October 2020, resulting in the deaths of 26 civilians and injuring over 83, making it the deadliest attack of the conflict. The casualties included a 39-year-old Red Crescent volunteer, while two other volunteers were injured. Civilian infrastructure and vehicles were extensively damaged. Armenia denied responsibility, but Amnesty International and Human Rights Watch stated that Armenia had fired, or intentionally supplied Artsakh with, the cluster munitions and Smerch rockets used in the attack. Artsakh acknowledged responsibility, but said it was targeting military facilities. Marie Struthers, Amnesty International's Regional Director for Eastern Europe and Central Asia, said that the "firing of cluster munitions into civilian areas is cruel and reckless, and causes untold death, injury and misery". The Azerbaijani ombudsman called the attack a "terrorist act against civilians". The use of cluster munitions was also reported by The New York Times. On 7 November, according to Human Rights Watch, the Armenian forces fired a rocket that struck an agricultural field near the village of Əyricə and killed a 16-year-old boy while he playing with other children. Azerbaijani authorities stated that they had identified the munition as a 9M528 Smerch rocket, which carries a warhead that produces blast and fragmentation effect. HRW reported that the researchers did not observe any military objectives in the area.

On 30 October 2020, Human Rights Watch reported that Armenia or Artsakh forces used cluster munition and stated that Armenia should immediately cease using cluster munitions or supplying them to Nagorno-Karabakh forces.

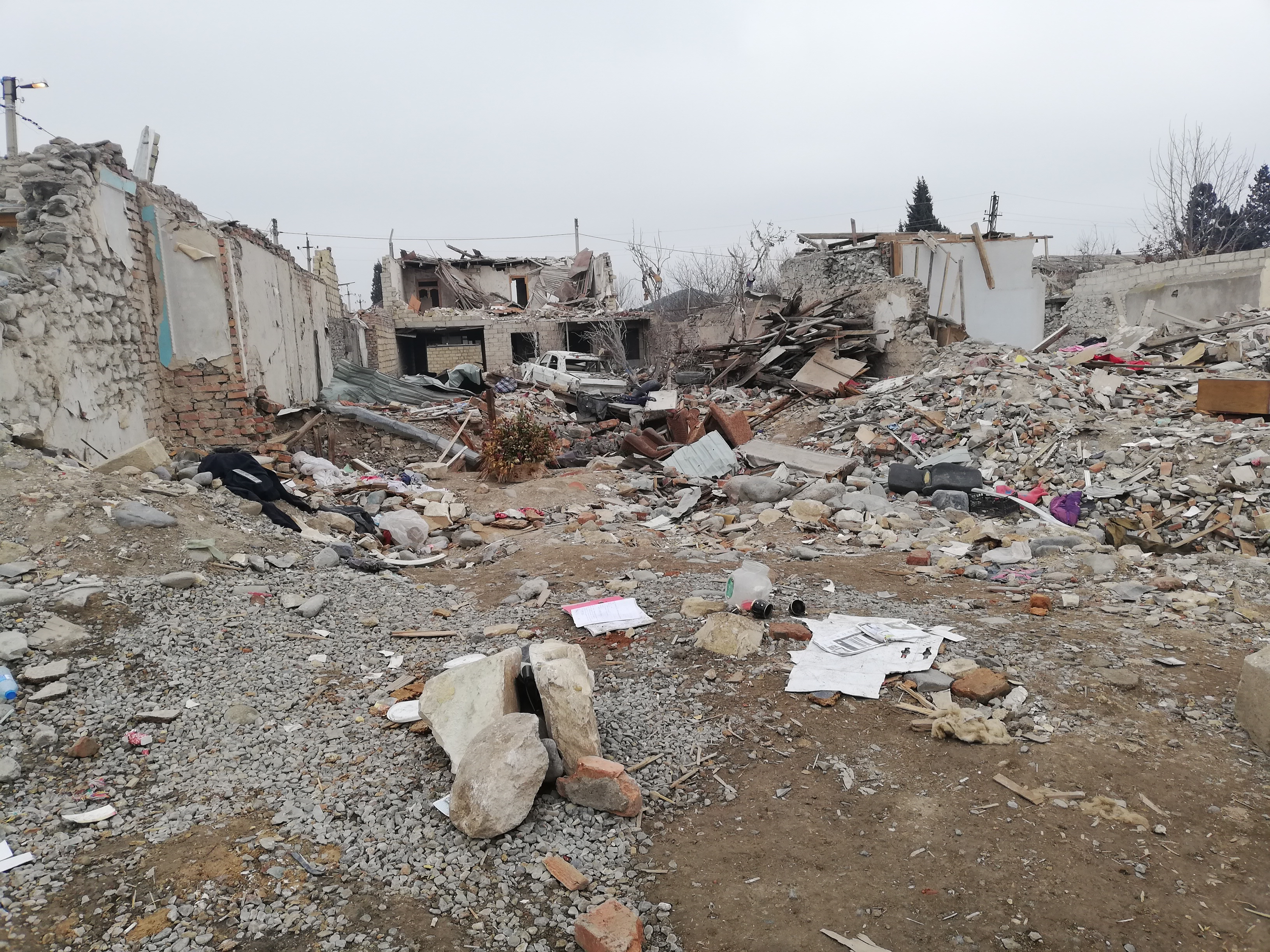
Destruction in Ganja after the Armenian missile attacks on the city.

In mid-November, a video of a wounded Azerbaijani soldier Amin Musayev receiving first aid by Ukrainian journalist Alexander Kharchenko and Armenian soldiers after the ceasefire came into force was spread on social media platforms. Following this, a video was released showing Musayev being abused inside a vehicle. It is reported that he was lying on the ground in the car and asked: "where are we going?" In response, the alleged Armenian soldier said, "If you behave well, go home," and cursed, after which it became clear that the Azerbaijani soldier had been kicked. On 18 November, a representative of the International Committee of the Red Cross (ICRC) in Yerevan said that information about this person was "being investigated." The ICRC's representative in Yerevan, Zara Amatuni, declined to say whether she had any information about Musayev. The Artsakh ombudsman said he had no information about the Azerbaijani soldier, but that if he was injured, he was "probably in hospital in Armenia." The Azerbaijani Foreign Ministry said in a statement that the issue was being investigated and will be reported to the relevant international organisations. According to the ministry, "the information about the torture of prisoners is first checked for accuracy and brought to the attention of relevant international organizations." On 25 November, ICRC's representatives visited Musayev and Karimov in Yerevan. On 5 December, the family of Musayev was informed of his condition through ICRC. According to a reported copy of the letter sent by Musayev, he stated that his condition was well. Musayev was returned to Azerbaijan on 15 December as part of the POW exchange deal. Azerbaijan had officially accused the Armenian side of ill-treating the Azerbaijani POWs. Several Azerbaijani POWs, in interviews with the Azerbaijani media outlets, had stated that they were tortured by their Armenian captors until being transferred back to Azerbaijan. Dilgam Asgarov, a Russian citizen of Azerbaijani descent, who was detained by the Armenian-allied forces alongside Shahbaz Guliyev, an Azerbaijani citizen, in 2014, during an incident in Kalbajar, in an interview to Virtual Azərbaycan newspaper he gave after being released, also stated that the Armenian captors had tortured the Azerbaijani POWs.

On 10 December, Amnesty International released a report on videos depicting war crimes from both sides. In one of the videos, the Armenian soldiers were seen cutting the throat of an Azerbaijani captive. The captive appears to be lying on the ground, whilst gagged and bound when an Armenian soldier approaches him and sticks a knife into his throat. Independent pathological analysis confirmed that the wound sustained led to his death in minutes. Eleven other videos showed violations upon Azerbaijani captives by the Armenian army. In several videos, Armenian soldiers are seen cutting the ear off a dead Azerbaijani soldier, dragging a dead Azerbaijani soldier across the ground by a rope tied around his feet, and standing on the corpse of a dead Azerbaijani soldier.

On 11 December, Human Rights Watch released an extensive report about Armenia's unlawful rocket strikes on Azerbaijani civilian areas. The report investigated 18 separate strikes, which killed 40 civilians and wounded dozens more. During on-site investigations in Azerbaijan in November, Human Rights Watch documented 11 incidents in which Armenian forces used ballistic missiles, unguided artillery rockets, large-calibre artillery projectiles and cluster munitions that hit populated areas in apparently indiscriminate attacks. In at least four other cases, munitions struck civilians or civilian objects in areas where there were no apparent military targets. In addition to causing civilian casualties, the Armenian attacks damaged homes, businesses, schools, and a health clinic, and contributed to mass displacement. It acknowledged the presence of military forces in two cities and two villages attacked by Armenian forces, claiming that Azerbaijan had unnecessarily put civilians at risk, however, it also stated that the presence of military targets did not excuse the use of inherently inaccurate weaponry with a large destructive radius in populated areas by Armenian forces. Human Rights Watch called the Armenian government to conduct transparent investigations into attacks by Armenian forces that violate international humanitarian law, or the laws of war. On 15 December, Human Rights Watch released another report about Armenia's use of cluster munitions in multiple attacks on Azerbaijani civilian areas. Its researchers documented four attacks with cluster munitions in three of the country's districts, Barda, Goranboy and Tartar which killed at least seven civilians, including two children, and wounded close to 20, including two children. Human Rights Watch also stated that as Nagorno-Karabakh forces do not possess cluster munitions, it is likely that Armenian forces carried out the attacks or supplied the munitions to Nagorno-Karabakh forces.

== Azerbaijani war crimes ==
Camera footage of Azerbaijan's use of cluster munition on Stepanakert during a shelling on 4 October 2020.

Stepanakert after the shelling on 4 October 2020.

On 4 October 2020, the Armenian government stated Azerbaijan had deployed cluster munitions against residential targets in Stepanakert; an Amnesty International investigator condemned this. In an Amnesty International report, the cluster bombs were identified as "Israeli-made M095 DPICM cluster munitions that appear to have been fired by Azerbaijani forces". The next day, Armenian Minister of Foreign Affairs Zohrab Mnatsakanyan stated to Fox News that the targeting of civilian populations in Nagorno-Karabakh by Azerbaijani forces was tantamount to war crimes and called for an end to the "aggression". In November 2020, Aliyev denied using cluster munitions against civilian areas in Stepanakert on the 1, 2, and 3 October 2020 in an interview with BBC News journalist Orla Guerin, describing as "fake news" the statements of other BBC reporters who witnessed the attacks and described them as "indiscriminate shelling of a town without clear military targets".

During an on-site investigation in Nagorno-Karabakh in October 2020, Human Rights Watch documented four incidents in which Azerbaijan used Israeli-supplied cluster munitions against civilian areas of Nagorno-Karabakh. The HRW investigation team stated that they did not find any sort of military sites in the residential neighbourhoods where the cluster munitions were used and condemned its use against civilian-populated areas. Stephen Goose, arms division director at Human Rights Watch and chair of the Cluster Munition Coalition, stated that "the continued use of cluster munitions – particularly in populated areas – shows flagrant disregard for the safety of civilians". He then added that "the repeated use of cluster munitions by Azerbaijan should cease immediately as their continued use serves to heighten the danger for civilians for years to come". The HRW investigation team also noted that numerous civilian buildings and infrastructure were heavily damaged due to shelling.

On 16 December, Human Rights Watch published a report about two separate attacks, hours apart, on the Ghazanchetsots Cathedral on 8 October in the town of Shusha, known to Armenians as Shushi, suggesting that the church, a civilian object with cultural significance, was an intentional target despite the absence of evidence that it was used for military purposes. The weapon remnants Human Rights Watch collected at the site corroborate the use of guided munitions. "The two strikes on the church, the second one while journalists and other civilians had gathered at the site, appear to be deliberate," said Hugh Williamson, Europe and Central Asia director at Human Rights Watch. "These attacks should be impartially investigated and those responsible held to account."

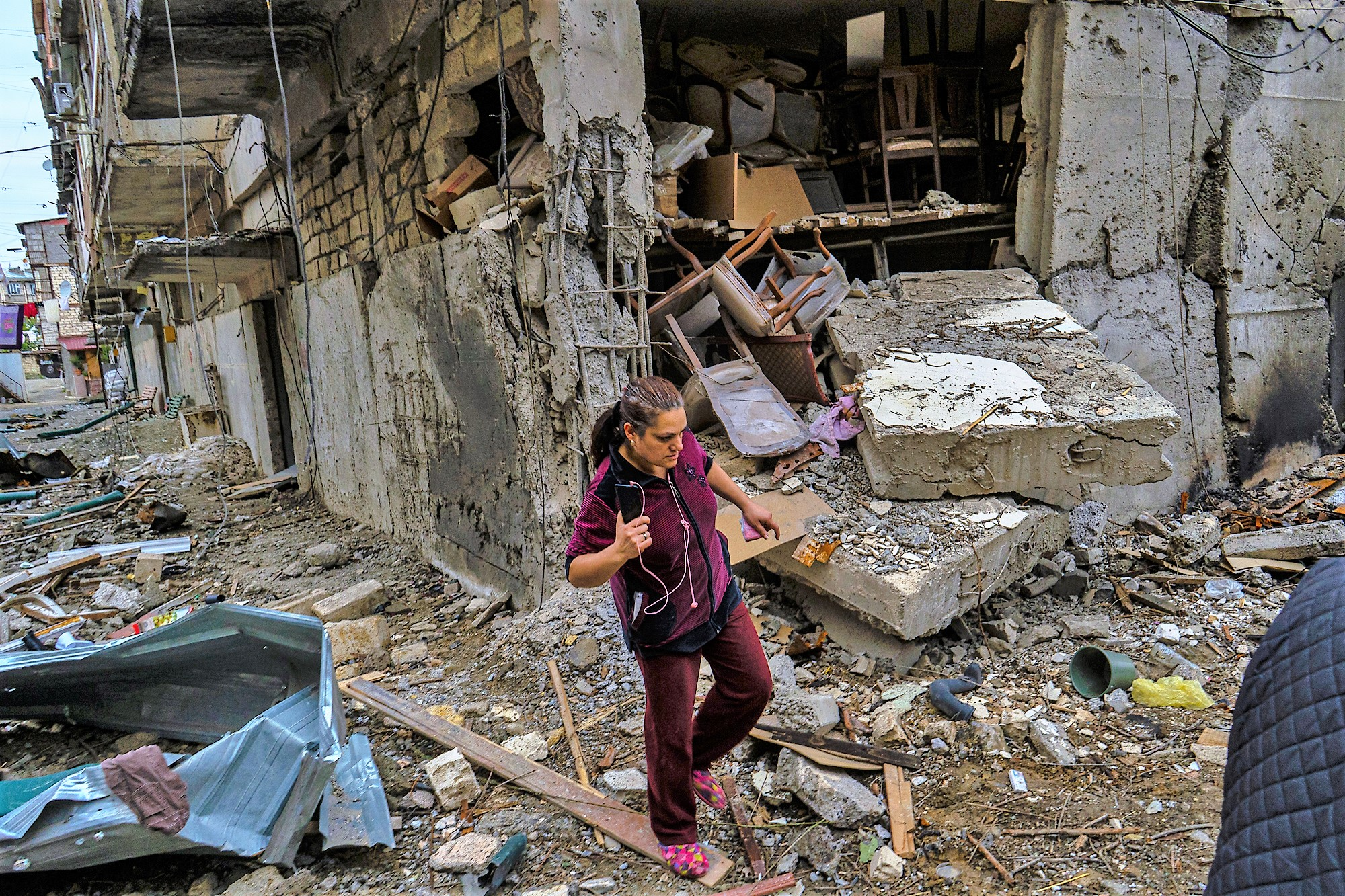
Destroyed housing complex after the Azerbaijani bombardment of Stepanakert

On 15 October 2020, a video surfaced of two captured Armenians being executed by Azerbaijani soldiers; Artsakh authorities identified one as a civilian. Bellingcat analysed the videos and concluded that the footage was real and that both executed were Armenian combatants captured by Azerbaijani forces between 9 and 15 October 2020 and later executed. The BBC also investigated the videos and confirmed that the videos were from Hadrut and were filmed some time between 9–15 October 2020. A probe has been launched by Armenia's human rights defender, Arman Tatoyan, who shared the videos with European Court of Human Rights and who will also show the videos to the UN human rights commissioner, the Council of Europe and other international organisations. The U.N. human rights chief, Michelle Bachelet, stated that "in-depth investigations by media organisations into videos that appeared to show Azerbaijani troops summarily executing two captured Armenians in military uniforms uncovered compelling and deeply disturbing information".

On 10 December, Amnesty International released a report on videos depicting war crimes from both sides. In some of these videos, Azerbaijani soldiers were seen decapitating the head of an undressed Armenian soldier as he was alive; the Azerbaijani soldiers cheered after the decapitation. In another video, the victim is an older man in civilian clothes who gets his throat cut despite pleading for mercy before the video abruptly ends. Seven other videos displayed violations by Azerbaijani forces upon Armenian prisoners. In another video, Azerbaijani soldiers beat bound and blindfolded Armenian prisoners, and forced them to make statements opposing their government.

Beheadings of two elderly ethnic Armenian Civilians by Azerbaijani armed forces have been identified by The Guardian. In videos posted online on 22 November and 3 December, men in Azerbaijani military uniforms hold down and decapitate a man using a knife. One then places the severed head on a dead pig. "This is how we get revenge – by cutting off heads," a voice says off-camera. The victim was identified as Genadi Petrosyan, 69, who had moved to Matadashen in the late 1980s from Sumgait. Another video posted on 7 December showed two soldiers in Azerbaijani military uniforms pinning down an elderly man near a tree. Another soldier passes a knife to one of the attackers, who begins slicing at the victim's neck. The victim was identified as Yuri Asryan, a reclusive 82-year-old who had refused to leave his village, Azokh.

In another video, a villager named Kamo Manasyan is kicked and beaten as blood streams from his right eye and then hit with a rifle stock.

External videos
- Nagorno-Karabakh hospital hit by shelling on YouTube

On 16 October, according to Armenia's ombudsman report, an Azerbaijani serviceman had called the brother of an Armenian soldier from the latter's phone number, saying that his brother was with them and that they had beheaded him and were going to post his photos on the internet; according to Armenian sources, they did post the image online. The Humanitarian Aid Relief Trust included the beheading of an Armenian soldier in their reporting.

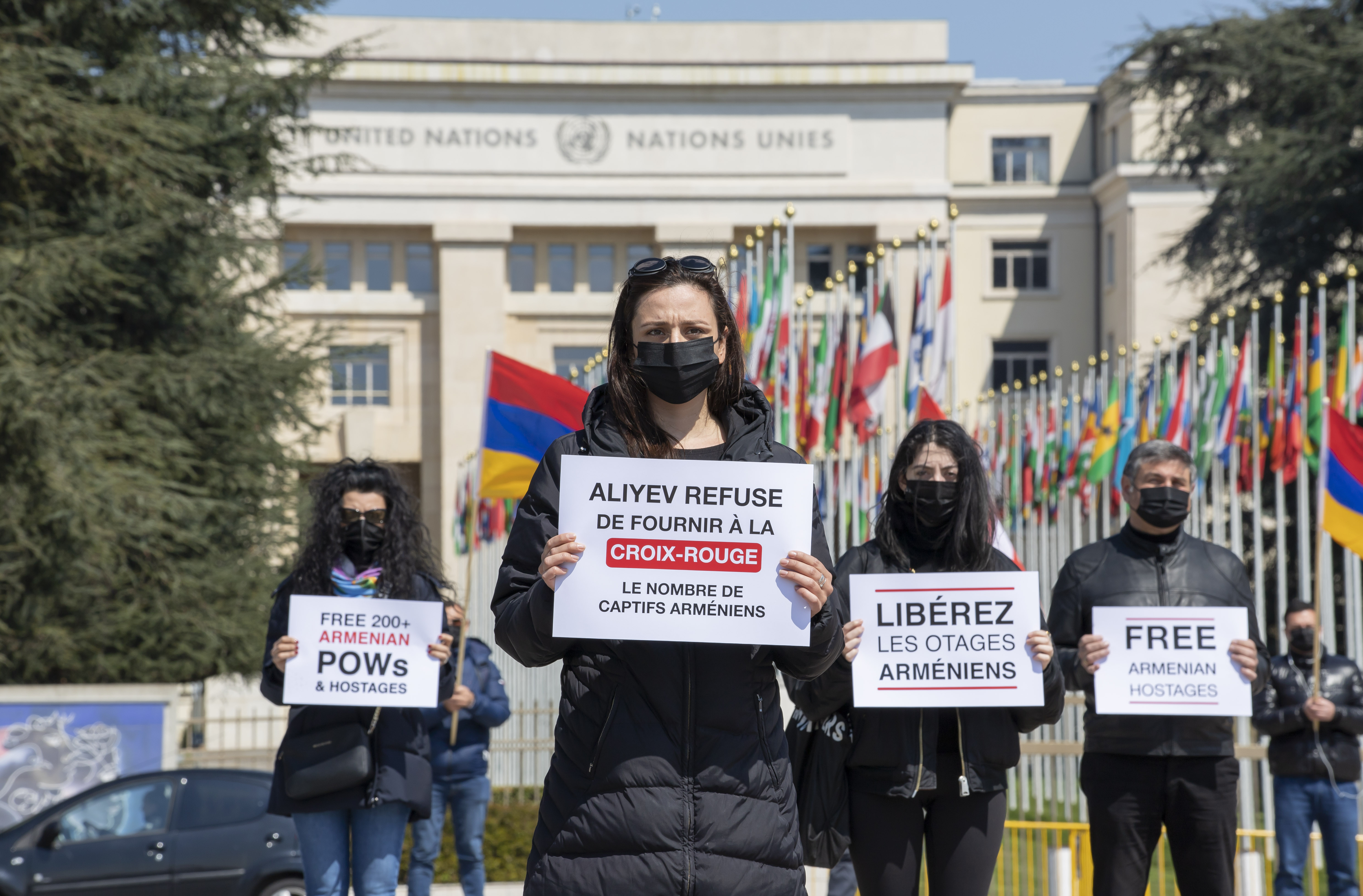
Protesters in Geneva demand the release of Armenian POWs, 15 April 2021

In early November, Armenia applied to European Convention on Human Rights over the videos of the brutal treatment of the bodies of Armenian POWs, which were spread on the social network. On 23 November, ECHR announced that it applies urgent measures in case of Armenian POWs and civilians held in Azerbaijan. Michael Rubin of the Washington Examiner, referring to the beheadings, the torture and mutilations of POWs, stated that, in contrast to Aliyev's reassurance of ethnic Armenians on remaining as residents of Azerbaijan, the actions of the Azerbaijani servicemen "tell a different story". Human Rights Watch reported about the videos depicting physical abuse and humiliation of Armenian POWs by their Azerbaijani captors, adding that most of the captors did not fear being held accountable, as their faces were visible in the videos. HRW spoke with the families of some of the POWs in the videos, who provided photographs and other documents establishing their identity, and confirmed that these relatives were serving either in the Artsakh Defence Army, or the Armenian armed forces.

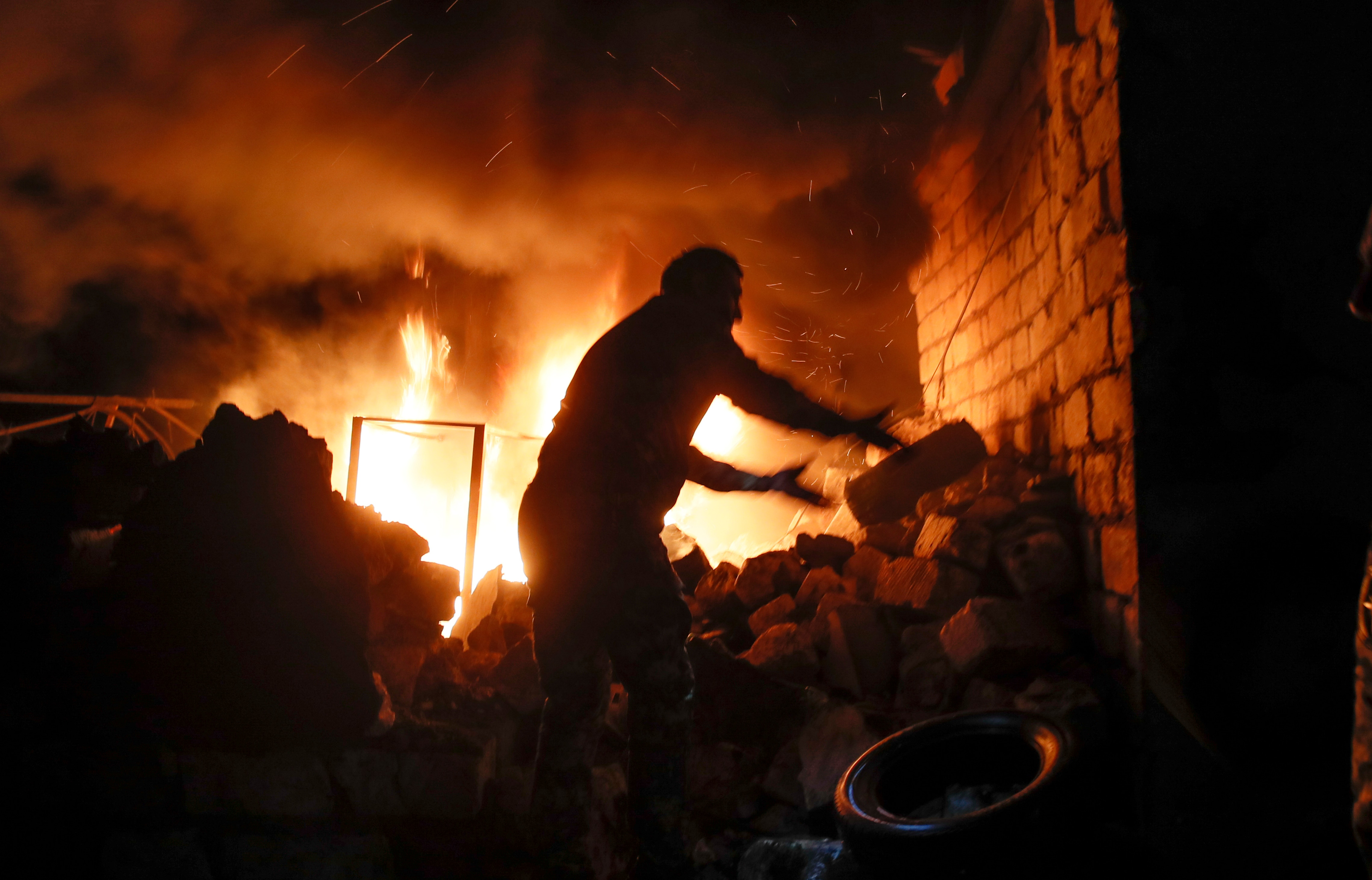
Artsakhi residents try to remove car tires from a burning car shop after shelling by Azerbaijan's artillery

A criminal case was opened in Azerbaijan over the Armenian POWs videos with the country's Prosecutor General's Office stating that inhuman treatment could result in the criminal prosecution of some soldiers serving in the Azerbaijani Armed Forces. It also stated that many of these videos were fake. On 14 December, the Azerbaijani security forces arrested two Azerbaijani privates and two other warrant officers accused of insulting the bodies of the Armenian servicemen and gravestones belonging to Armenians. The Azerbaijani human rights activists considered the government reaction to the suspected war crimes to be adequate, although some Azerbaijani social media users argued about whether their persecution was justified, also criticising Armenia not investigating its suspected war crimes.

On 19 March 2021, Human Rights Watch published a report regarding Armenian prisoners of war abused by Azerbaijani forces, subjecting them to cruel and degrading treatment and torture either when they were captured, during their transfer, or while in custody at various detention facilities. Hugh Williamson, Europe and Central Asia director at Human Rights Watch, named these actions by Azerbaijani forces "abhorrent and a war crime".

On 3 May 2021, Artak Zeynalyan reported that Azerbaijani servicemen tortured and killed 19 Armenian POWs, which is a war crime. The list of 19 killed includes 12 civilians and seven servicemen. According to Human Rights Defender of Armenia Arman Tatoyan, the study of the collected videos and photos shows that the tortures, cruelties, and inhuman treatment by the Azerbaijani Armed Forces against Armenian POWs have been committed with motives of ethnic hatred.

== White phosphorus use allegations ==
On 30 October, Armenian and Artsakh authorities had accused the Azerbaijani forces of using phosphorus to burn forests near Shusha. This was supported by "Ecocide alert" from 51 non-governmental organisations under the auspices of Transparency International. France 24 reported that Azerbaijan could have used white phosphorus during the war, highlighting that its use is strictly regulated under an international agreement that neither Azerbaijan nor Armenia have signed. A reporter of The Independent who visited the National Burns Centre in Yerevan saw the soldiers' burns, which, according to deputy director of the centre, were consistent with white phosphorus damage in 80% cases. Patrick Knipper, an orthopaedic surgeon and a specialist in severe burns at the Assistance Publique – Hôpitaux de Paris, who was in Yerevan as part of a French assistance mission to help with the treatment of the injured arriving from the front, provided the first independent confirmation of burns being the result of white phosphorus munition use to Le Point magazine, highlighting the characteristic deep burns, hypocalcaemia and sudden deaths in his conclusion Azerbaijan denied using white phosphorus. Two interviewed Russian military experts did not find evidence provided by the Armenian side to be convincing, and expressed their doubts that white phosphorus was used by either side of the conflict. However, on 22 September 2021, the U.S. House of Representatives passed the Amendment, calling for a report on Azerbaijani war crimes, including the use of illegal munitions and white phosphorus against Armenian civilians.

In late October and early November, Azerbaijan accused the Armenian forces of using white phosphorus on civilian areas. Then, on 4 November, Azerbaijan National Agency for Mine Action (ANAMA) reported finding unexploded white phosphorus munitions in Səhləbad, near Tartar, which, according to Azerbaijan, were fired by the Armenian forces. Azerbaijani authorities claimed the Armenian forces were transporting white phosphorus into the region. On 20 November, Prosecutor General's Office of Azerbaijan filed a lawsuit, accusing the Armenian Armed Forces of using phosphorus ammunition in Nagorno-Karabakh, as well as in Tartar District, and chemical munitions to "inflict large-scale and long-term harm to the environment" in Fuzuli and Tartar Districts, as well as around Shusha.
