= 2020 Barda missile attacks =

Missile attacks on Barda, Azerbaijan in October 2020

Barda missile attacks
- Part of the Second Nagorno-Karabakh War
- Location: Barda, Əyricə, and Qarayusifli, Azerbaijan
- Date: 27 October 2020; 28 October 2020; 7 November 2020 (GMT+4)
- Attack type: Missile attack
- Weapon: Cluster missiles; BM-30 Smerch
- Deaths: 27
- Injuries: 85
- Perpetrator: Armenian Armed Forces; Artsakh Defence Army

The Barda missile attacks (Azerbaijani: Bərdənin bombalanması) was a series of three air attacks on the city of Barda, as well as the villages of Əyricə and Qarayusifli in the same district, in Azerbaijan during the Second Nagorno-Karabakh War. The attacks involved BM-30 Smerch missiles with cluster warheads, and resulted in 27 civilian deaths.

The first attack took place on 27 October, killing 5 civilians and wounding 13 more. The next day, on 28 October, several missiles struck Barda, killing 21 civilians, including a Red Crescent volunteer, and wounding 60 more. It was the deadliest attack on civilians and the worst civilian death toll during the war. On 7 November, the Armenian forces fired a rocket on the village of Əyricə, killing a 16-year-old boy.

Azerbaijan accused Armenia of the attacks and stated that cluster munitions had been used against civilians. Human Rights Watch and Amnesty International verified the use of cluster munition by Armenia, adding that the "firing of cluster munitions into civilian areas is cruel and reckless, and causes untold death, injury and misery." Armenia denied any responsibility, while the unrecognized Republic of Artsakh admitted responsibility for the attacks but stated that it had targeted military facilities.

== Background ==
On 27 September 2020, clashes broke out in the disputed Nagorno-Karabakh region, which is mostly de facto controlled by Artsakh, but de jure part of Azerbaijan. Barda is home to a population of 40 thousand people; and is situated about 20 kilometres (12 miles) northeast of the former Nagorno-Karabakh Line of Contact.

Trilateral talks on the conflict between the foreign ministers of Russia, Armenia and Azerbaijan commenced on 9 October 2020 in Moscow. Sergey Lavrov, Zohrab Mnatsakanyan, and Jeyhun Bayramov participated in the talks. Lavrov issued a joint statement following ten hours of talks that ended at 03:00 local time, confirming that a humanitarian ceasefire would come into force at midday. Minutes after the truce was due to commence, the two parties blamed each other for violating the ceasefire.

Since 4 October, Azerbaijan's second-largest city Ganja, had been hit four times by Armenian and Artsakh missiles, resulting in 25 civilians getting killed and 125 more injured. On 8 October Azerbaijani Ministry of Defense reported that Barda District was shelled by a OTR-21 Tochka missile launcher.

On 26 October, the United States announced that both sides had agreed to a humanitarian ceasefire from the morning of 26 October, but it was violated minutes after taking into force, with both sides accusing each other of breaking it.

== Attacks ==
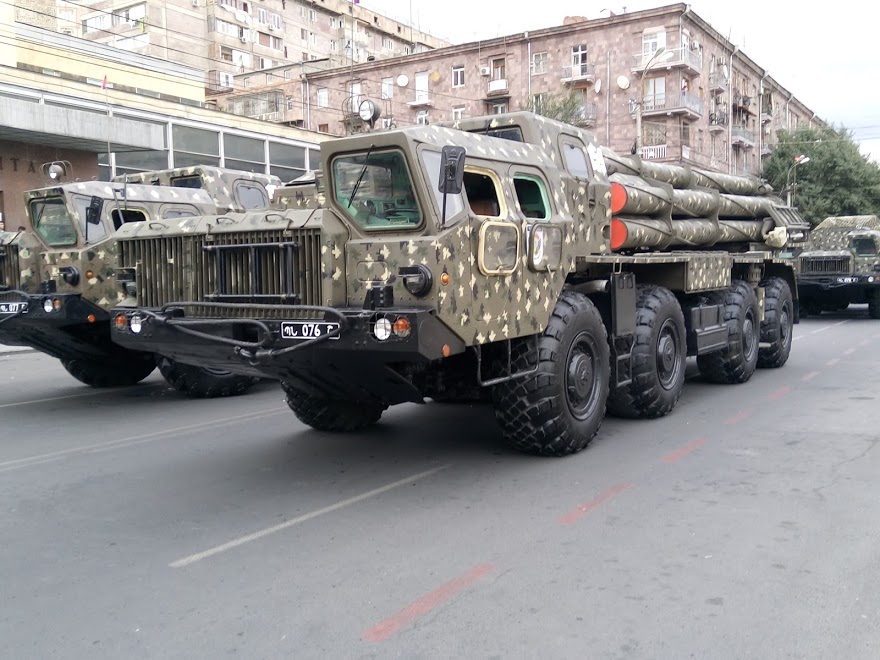
An Armenian BM-30 Smerch rocket launcher in 2017.

The first attack took place on 27 October, in Qarayusifli, killing 5 civilians and injuring 15 others. It involved cluster missiles from a BM-30 Smerch multiple rocket launcher. Human Rights Watch observed significant damage to 12 houses in the area.

The second attack on 28 October occurred at around 13:00 local time. It involved cluster missiles that hit densely populated urban areas with trade facilities, which Amnesty International and Human Rights Watch confirmed. As a result, 21 civilians were killed and over 70 were wounded. Among the dead, was a 39-year-old Red Crescent volunteer, while two other volunteers were injured. Civil infrastructure facilities and vehicles were extensively damaged, including, according to Human Rights Watch, Barda Treatment and Diagnostic Center, State Migration Service office. According to Azerbaijan, the second attack also involved a BM-30 Smerch with a cluster warhead equipped with fragmentation warheads of 72–144 pieces in total. Azerbaijan accused Armenia for the attacks, which it denied any responsibility, while Amnesty International and Human Rights Watch also stated that it was Armenia who had carried out the attack. In the meanwhile, the unrecognized Republic of Artsakh admitted responsibility for the second attack, but stated that it had targeted military facilities. New York Times reporting team was caught in an Armenian rocket attack driving along the main street of Barda.

The third attack on 7 November occurred in the village of Əyricə. According to a Human Rights Watch report, the Armenian forces fired a rocket that struck an agricultural field near the village and killed a 16-year-old boy while he playing with other children. Azerbaijani authorities stated that they had identified the munition as a 9M528 Smerch rocket, which carries a warhead that produces blast and fragmentation effect. HRW reported that the researchers did not observe any military objectives in the area.

== Azerbaijani response ==
Soon after the attacks, the Azerbaijani Ministry of Defence released drone footage, claiming to have retaliated for the attacks, especially targeting the Armenian manpower, rather than the equipment as previously displayed.

The firing position of the BM-30 Smerch launcher involved in the attacks was identified by Azerbaijani army and on 29 October it was destroyed. On 30 October, Azerbaijani Defense Ministry announced the destruction of two more Smerch launchers that had targeted Barda and Tartar.

== Reactions ==
In Azerbaijan, the attacks were strongly condemned, with the country's Presidential Administration calling the first attack a "new act of genocide", while the Azerbaijani Ombudsman Sabina Aliyeva labelled the second attack a "terrorist act against civilians". President of Azerbaijan, Ilham Aliyev promised a befitting response for the attacks. Also, Vice President of Azerbaijan, Mehriban Aliyeva stated that the attacks were barbaric and expressed her condolences.

On international scale, the attacks were condemned by Turkey and Pakistani, Iranian, French, and Kazakh embassies in Azerbaijan, Iranian politician Hassan Ameli, and the Turkic Council.

Marie Struthers, Amnesty International's Regional Director for Eastern Europe and Central Asia stated that the "firing of cluster munitions into civilian areas is cruel and reckless, and causes untold death, injury and misery". Similarly, Human Rights Watch released a report about the attack, confirming the use of cluster munitions and called Armenia to stop using banned weapons.
