= Siyavush Novruzov =

Azerbaijani politician (born 1969)

Siyavush Novruzov Member of the National Assembly of Azerbaijan

Member of the Azerbaijan Parliament for Shahbuz-Babek region

Personal details
- Born: Siyavuş Dünyamalı oğlu Novruzov; 17 February 1969 (age 57)
- Party: New Azerbaijan Party
- Education: Faculty of Law Academy of Public Administration, Faculty of State and Municipal Administration

Siyavush Dunyamali oghlu Novruzov (Azerbaijani: Siyavuş Dünyamalı oğlu Novruzov, born 17 February 1969) is a Member of the National Assembly of Azerbaijan is the second, third, fourth, fifth and sixth convocation Member of the Milli Mejlis (National Assembly) of the Republic of Azerbaijan. He is also chairman of the Committee on Regional Affairs of the Milli Mejlis, Deputy Executive Secretary of the New Azerbaijan Party (YAP), DPhil in Law.

== Life and education ==
Siyavush Dunyamali oghlu Novruzov was born in Jahri village of Babek District, in the Nakhchivan Autonomous Republic of Azerbaijan on February 17, 1969.

Siyavush Novruzov is a Master of Sport in freestyle wrestling. He was involved in professional sport at the age of 10. He became a champion of the competition among the military servicemen.

During 1990–1995, he studied at the Faculty of Law of Baku State University and in 1999–2002, attended the faculty of State and Municipal Administration of the Academy of Public Administration under the President of the Republic of Azerbaijan. He is a Doctor of Philosophy in Law (DPhil).

During 1987–1990, Novruzov served in the USSR army. During 1990–1993, he actively engaged in military operations in Karabakh, as well as in battles in Sadarak District. He is a veteran of Karabakh War.

For his active participation in public and political life, Siyavush Novruzov was awarded the “Medal for Services to the Fatherland’ of the first degree by the Presidential Order of November 18, 2017, and by the Presidential Order of February 16, 2019, he was awarded the “Order of Glory” for his active participation in public and political life.

He speaks Azerbaijani, Russian and English languages.

== Personal life ==
He is married and has two children. His wife is the Commissioner for Human Rights (Ombudsman) of the Republic of Azerbaijan, Sabina Aliyeva.

== Socio-Political life ==
From 1990, he has worked as a Head and Executive Secretary of the Charity Association “Elinje”. He was a Head of the Central Office and Head of the Administrative Department of YAP in 1994–199 years. Between 1995 and 2005, he was a chair of the Society of the Young People under YAP. He is a Member and deputy executive secretary of the Political Council of YAP.

In 2002, he was elected to the Milli Mejlis of the second convocation in the 3rd place in the common election list of YAP in multi-member constituencies with a proportional electoral system. In 2005, 2010, 2015 and 2020, he was a Member of the Parliament for Shahbuz-Babek region constituency in the majority order. For many years, he has served as the chairman of the Parliamentary Disciplinary Commission and of the Parliamentary Committee on Public Association and Religious Organizations. Currently, he is chairman of the Parliamentary Committee on Regional Affairs.

== Awards ==
- 22.10.2019- Jubilee Medal “100th Anniversary of the Baku State University (1919-2019)” by the Order of the President of the Republic of Azerbaijan;
- 10.10.2019- Medal of “25th anniversary of the Azerbaijan Patriotic War Veterans Public Union (AVMVIB)”;
- 14.08.2019-Jubilee Medal “100th Anniversary of Azerbaijan’s Border protection (1919-2019)” by the Order of the Chief of the State Border Service of the Republic of Azerbaijan on behalf of the President of the Republic of Azerbaijan;
- 09.07.2019-Jubilee Medal “100th Anniversary of the Diplomatic Service Bodies of the Republic of Azerbaijan (1919-2019)” by the Order of the Ministry of Foreign Affairs of the Republic of Azerbaijan on behalf of the President of the Republic of Azerbaijan;
- 16.02.2019 - Order of “Shohrat” (“Glory”) for his active participation in the socio-political life of the Republic of Azerbaijan by the Decree of the President of the Republic of Azerbaijan;
- 27.05.2019- Jubilee Medal “100th Anniversary of the Azerbaijan Democratic Republic (1918-2018)” by the Order of the President of the Republic of Azerbaijan;
- 24.12.2019- Jubilee Medal “100th anniversary of the Parliament of Azerbaijan” by the Order of the President of the Republic of Azerbaijan;
- 15.10.2018 - Jubilee Medal “100th Anniversary of the Azerbaijani Army (1918-2018)” by the Order of the Minister of Defense of the Republic of Azerbaijan on behalf of the President of the Republic of Azerbaijan;
- 05.07.2018 - Jubilee medal of the Republic of Azerbaijan “The 100th Anniversary of the Azerbaijani Police (1918-2018)” by the Order of the Minister of Internal Affairs of the Republic of Azerbaijan;
- 18.11.2017 - The first degree “For Service to the Homeland” Order by the President of the Republic of Azerbaijan;
- 15.02.2017 - Medal “For Services to the Homeland” on behalf of the Russian Union of Veterans of Afghanistan;
- He was awarded the honorary badge for his great services and support for veteran movements;
- 02.02.2017 - Medal for his services to the veterans’ organization of the “Brotherhood of Battle” by the chairman of the All-Russian public organization of veterans of the “Brotherhood of Battle”, former First Deputy Minister of Internal Affairs of the USSR Colonel-General B.Gromov;
- 16.11.2016 Medal “For the sake of Homeland” by the Azerbaijan Karabakh war invalids, veterans and martyrs’ families Public Association;
- 11.11.2016-Medal “Fadai” by the Azerbaijan Karabakh war invalids, veterans and martyrs’ families Public Association;
- 27.10.2016-Jubilee medal of “General Jamshid Nakhchivanski” by the Veterans Organization of the Republic of Azerbaijan;
- 14.09.2016-Order for “Loyalty to the Homeland” by Colonel-General V.F. Yermakov, the Chairman of the All-Russian Public Union of Veterans of the Armed Forces of the Russian Federation, former Deputy Minister of Defense of the USSR for Personnel for a great contribution to strengthening the country's defensive capabilities;
- 01.05.2015 - Order “For Service to Homeland” by F.A.Klinsevich, Chairman of the Russian Union of Afghan Veterans;
- 07.04.2014 - Jubilee Medal “95th Anniversary of the National Security Bodies of the Republic of Azerbaijan (1919-2014)" by the Ministry of National Security of the Republic of Azerbaijan;
- 15.02.2014 - Jubilee Medal “25th Anniversary of the withdrawal of Soviet troops from Afghanistan” by the Committee for Coordination of Joint Activities of Veterans’ Associations;
- 28.01.2014 - Medal “In memory of the 25th Anniversary of the end of the combat operations in Afghanistan” by the State Service for Mobilization and Conscription of the Republic of Azerbaijan;
- 21.01.2014 - Membership Card issued by Azerbaijan Veterans Public Association (VS # 01064);
- Medal on the 20th anniversary of the withdrawal of Soviet troops from Afghanistan by R.S.Aushev, Chairman of the Committee on the Affairs of War Internationalists under the Council of Heads of Government of CIS member states;
- 26.06.2012 – “Afghanistan War Veteran” Medal by the All-Russian Public Organization of “Russian Union of Afghan Veterans”
- 30.09.2009 - License of the War Veteran of the Republic of Azerbaijan by Yasamal DMC of the Ministry of Defense of the Republic of Azerbaijan
- 26.03.2009 - Jubilee medal of the “90th Anniversary of the National Security Bodies of Azerbaijan (1919-2009)” by the Ministry of National Security of the Republic of Azerbaijan;
- 1988 - Appreciation from the Defense Ministry of the Republic of;
