= Elmira Süleymanova =

Azerbaijani chemist and civil servant (1937–2024)

1st Ombudsman
- In office 2 July 2002 – 29 November 2019
- President: Ilham Aliyev
- Succeeded by: Sabina Aliyeva

Personal details
- Born: 17 July 1937 Baku, Azerbaijan SSR, USSR
- Died: 25 April 2024 (aged 86) Baku, Azerbaijan
- Education: Baku State University; Azerbaijan National Academy of Sciences

Elmira Teymur qızı Süleymanova (Azerbaijani: Elmira Teymur qızı Süleymanova; 17 July 1937 – 25 April 2024) was an Azerbaijani chemist and civil servant. In 2002, she became the Commissioner for Human Rights (Ombudsman) of the Republic.

== Biography ==
Süleymanova was born in Baku on 17 July 1937 and graduated in chemistry from the State University of Azerbaijan and graduated with honors. She then worked in the Institute of Petrochemical Processes of Azerbaijan National Academy of Sciences as a laboratory assistant and later became the head of the laboratory. She got a postgraduate degree from the National Academy of Sciences in 1967 and a doctorate in 1980. She started working as a university professor in 1988. She was also a member of the New York Academy of Sciences from 1997 onward. She was the author of 200 scientific works and collaborated in around 40 inventions for the chemistry and perfumery industries.

Süleymanova was an expert in petrochemicals and organic chemistry. She was the founder and honorary president of the Azerbaijan Women and Development Center, a non-profit organization that has a consultative status with the UN Economic and Social Council.

Süleymanova died in Baku on 25 April 2024, at the age of 86.

== Career as Ombudsman ==
The National Assembly elected Süleymanova as the first Ombudsman on 2 July 2002, and re-elected her in 2010.

In 2004, regarding the 30-year prison sentence of Ramil Safarov, she stated that Safarov's punishment was too harsh and that "Safarov must become an example of patriotism for the Azerbaijani youth".

In 2015, she was named vice president of the Asian Ombudsman Association, and was also a member of the European Ombudsman Institute. As Ombudsman, she implemented programs that aimed to protect the status of women, the elderly, displaced youth, the poor, and victims of violence.

President Ilham Aliyev awarded her the Order of Glory in 2007 and the Order of Honor in 2017 for her contribution to the defense of human rights.

== Controversy ==
In 2004, she stated that axe murderer Ramil Safarov should serve as "an example for Azerbaijani youth".
