= Qarayusifli =

- Municipality
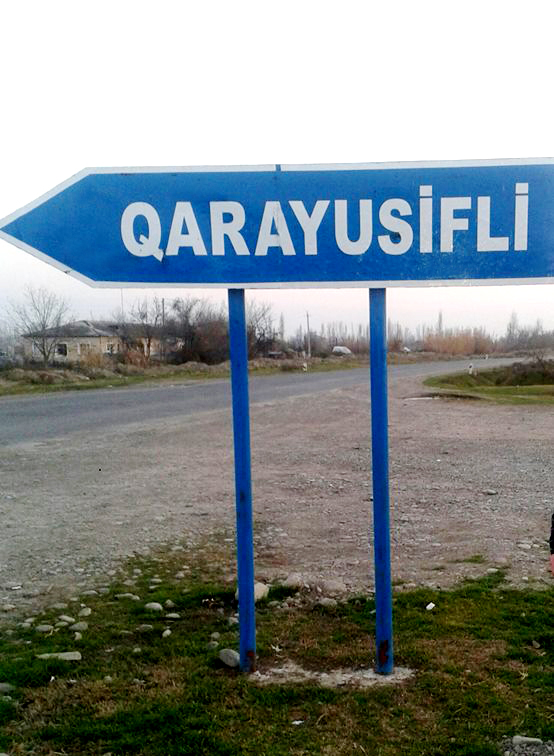
- Sign at the entrance of the village

- Location within Azerbaijan Location within Karabakh Economic Region
- Coordinates: 40°18′52″N 47°10′51″E
- Country: Azerbaijan
- District: Barda

Population
  - Total: 1,138
- Time zone: UTC+4 (AZT)
  - Summer (DST): UTC+5 (AZT)

Qarayusifli (Garayusifli) is a village and municipality in the Barda District of Azerbaijan. It has a population of 1,138.

== See also ==
- 2020 Barda missile attacks
