= Əyricə =

- Municipality
- Location within Azerbaijan Location within Karabakh Economic Region
- Coordinates: 40°27′N 47°15′E
- Country: Azerbaijan
- District: Barda

Population
  - Total: 722
- Time zone: UTC+4 (AZT)
  - Summer (DST): UTC+5 (AZT)

Əyricə (Ayrija) is a village and municipality in the Barda District of Azerbaijan. It has a population of 722.

== See also ==
- 2020 Barda missile attacks
