= 2020 Ganja missile attacks =

Attacks on Ganja, Azerbaijan

Ganja missile attacks
- Part of the Second Nagorno-Karabakh War
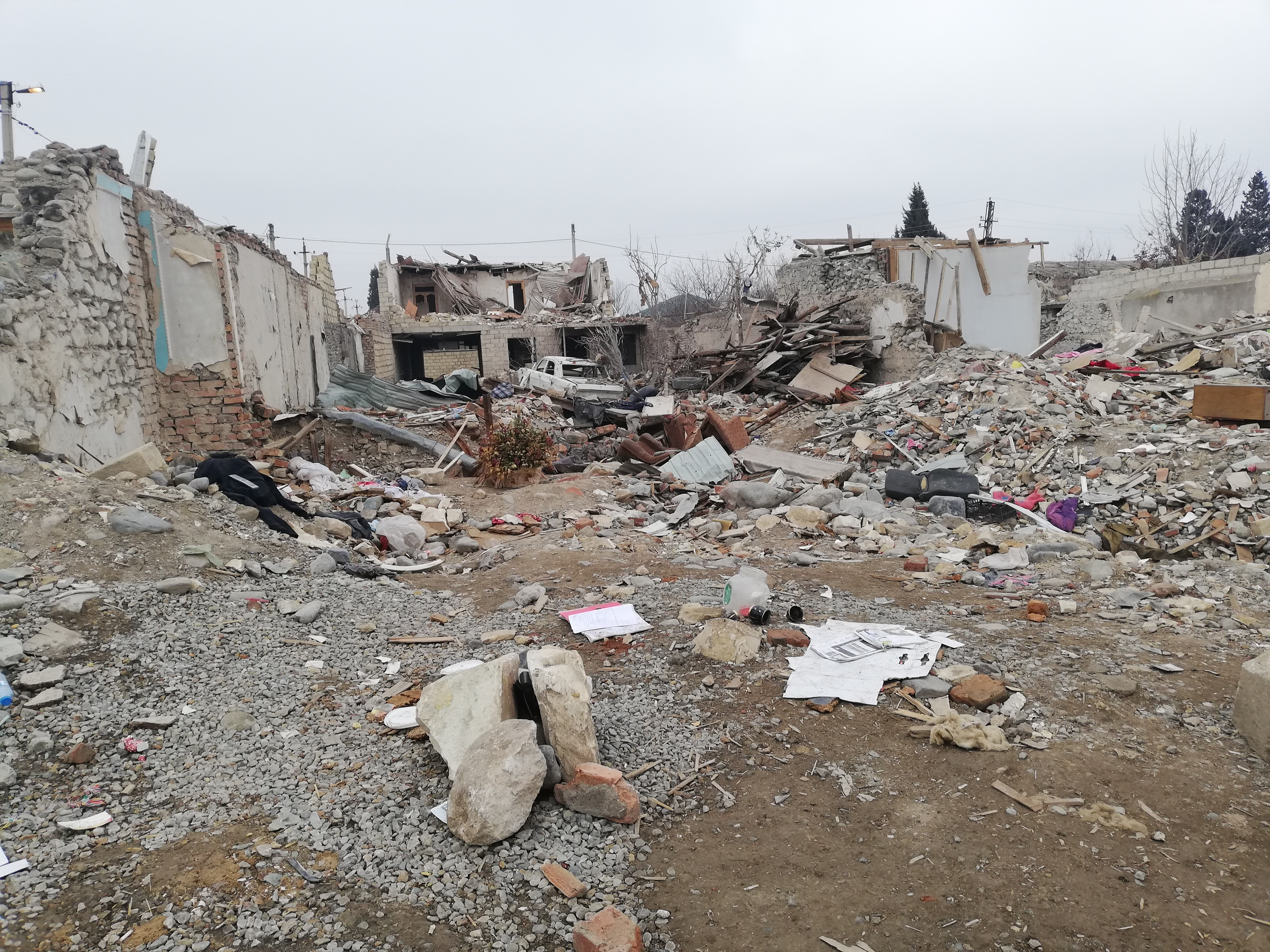
- Ruins in Ganja after the attacks

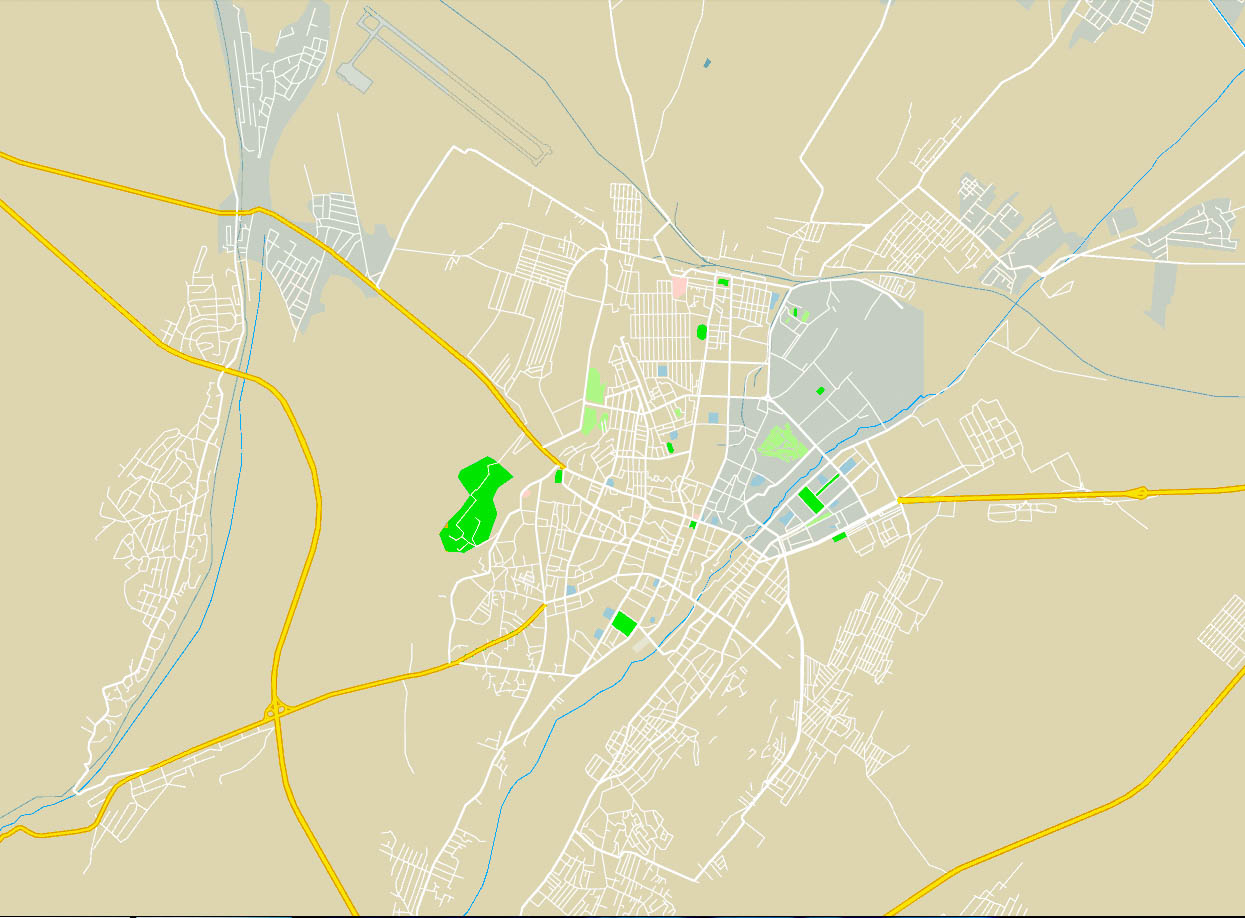
- Locations of the ballistic missile attacks First attack Second attack Third attack Fourth attack
- Location: Ganja, Azerbaijan
- Date: 4 October 2020; 8 October 2020; 10 October 2020; 17 October 2020 (GMT+4)
- Attack type: Ballistic missile attack
- Weapon: OTR-21 Tochka (first and second attacks); Scud missile (third and fourth attacks)
- Deaths: 32
- Injuries: 125
- Perpetrators: Armenian Armed Forces; Artsakh Defence Army

The Ganja ballistic missile attacks (Azerbaijani: Gəncə bombalanmaları) comprise four separate ballistic missile attacks on the city of Ganja, Azerbaijan, in October 2020, carried out by the Armenian military forces during the Second Nagorno-Karabakh War.

The first attack took place on 4 October, killing one civilian and wounding over 30. The second attack occurred on 8 October; no casualties were reported. The third attack happened on 11 October. According to Azerbaijan's Foreign Ministry, at least seven people died and 33 were injured, including children. The fourth attack occurred on 17 October. According to initial reports, fifteen civilians were killed and fifty-five injured in the attack. Infrastructure was also destroyed, including apartment blocks and other buildings, and vehicles.

== Background ==
On 27 September 2020, clashes broke out in the disputed Nagorno-Karabakh region, which is mostly de facto controlled by the breakaway Republic of Artsakh, but de jure a part of Azerbaijan, which soon escalated into a war. Ganja, the second largest city of Azerbaijan, is home to a population of 335 thousand people; it was situated 97 kilometres (60 miles) north of the former Nagorno-Karabakh Line of Contact and 241 kilometres (150 miles) east of the Armenian–Azerbaijani state border.

On 4 October, after the first attack, Arayik Harutyunyan, the self-proclaimed Republic of Artsakh's president, issued a warning to the Azerbaijani army and civilians for the latter to leave Ganja, claiming that military facilities were permanently located in the city. On 5 October, spokesman of self-proclaimed Republic of Artsakh's president, Vahram Poghosyan echoing the earlier warning of Arayik of Harutyunian, made a statement saying that "A few more days and I am afraid that even archaeologists will not be able to find the place of Ganja. Get sober before it is too late." According to Human Rights Watch, attack threats on unnamed targets over an unspecified time period in a language that only a few Azerbaijanis can understand were ineffective warnings.

Trilateral talks on the conflict between the foreign ministers of Russia, Armenia and Azerbaijan commenced on 9 October 2020 in Moscow. Sergey Lavrov, Zohrab Mnatsakanyan, and Jeyhun Bayramov participated in the talks. Lavrov issued a joint statement following ten hours of talks that ended at 03:00 local time, confirming that a humanitarian ceasefire would come into force at midday. Minutes after the truce was due to commence, the two parties blamed each other for violating the ceasefire. Azerbaijan underlined that the ceasefire was temporary and emphasized that it would not renege on its goal to retake control of the region.

== Attacks ==
=== First attack ===
External videos
- Footage shows shelling in city of Ganja on YouTube

Ganja was first hit by a missile on 4 October. Artsakh denied targeting residential areas, but rather military targets, especially Ganja International Airport, and Arayik Harutyunyan, the president of the de facto Republic of Artsakh, claimed that military facilities permanently located there had been targeting civilians in Stepanakert using Polonez and Smerch missiles; Azerbaijan denied reports of there being military targets in the city. Subsequently, both a correspondent reporting from the scene for a Russian media outlet and the airport director denied that the airport, which had not been operational since March due to the COVID-19 pandemic, had been hit while an Irish journalist, Orla Guerin visited the scene and found no evidence of any military target there.

According to Human Rights Watch, two residential buildings, one of them a multi-family one, were destroyed and about 30 houses were damaged on Ali Nizami Street. As a result of the attack, one civilian was killed, while 30 were injured.

=== Second attack ===
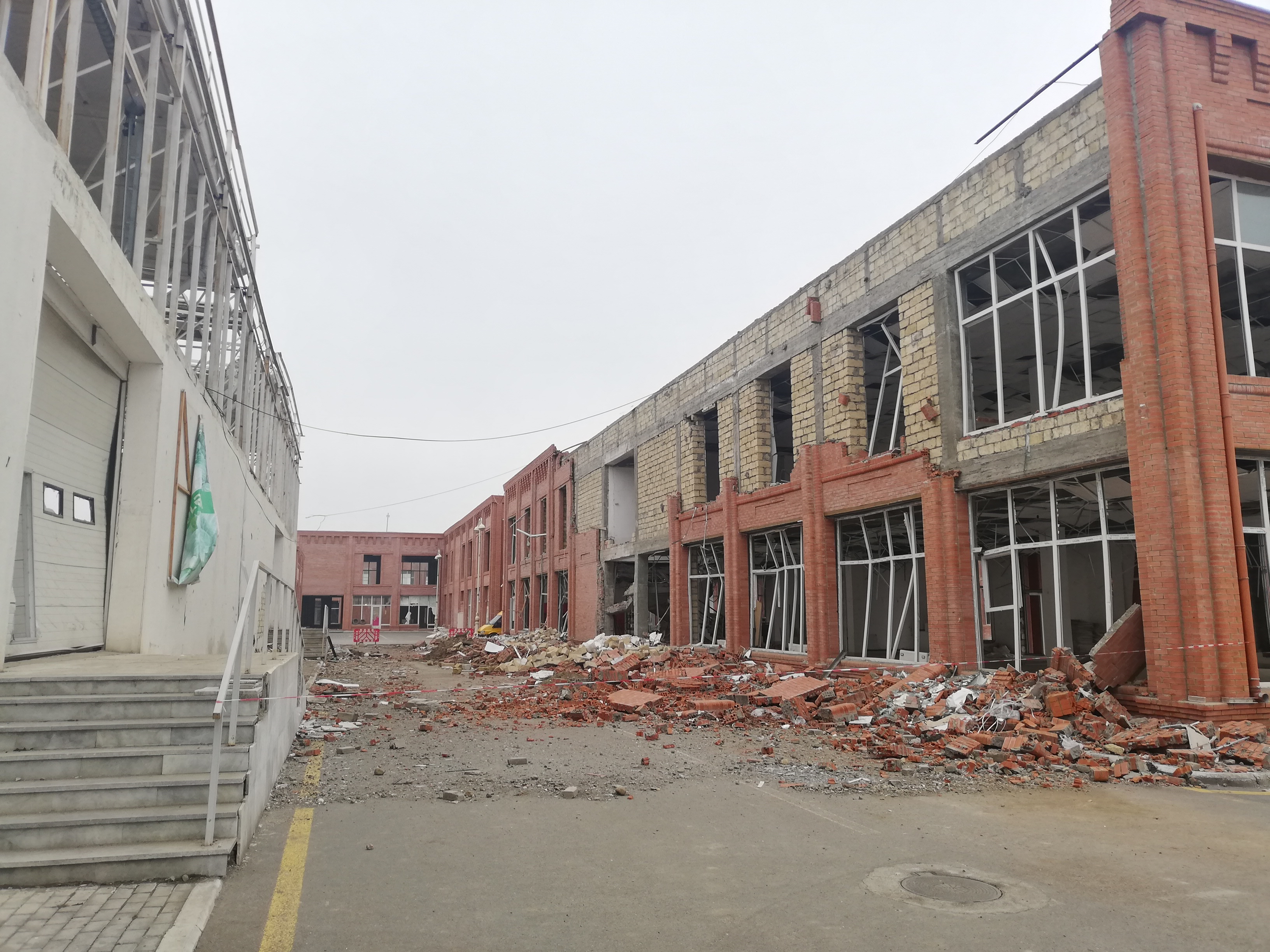
Aftermath of the shelling

Ganja was hit again on 8 October. No civilian casualties were reported, but a number of residential buildings and a school were damaged.

=== Third attack ===
A day after the ceasefire signed on 10 October, at 02:00 local time the Azerbaijani Ministry of Defence stated that Armenian armed forces in Berd, Armenia, had fired upon Ganja with a Scud missile; the missile hit an apartment building, completely destroying it. Search and rescue teams shortly afterwards arrived at the scene. During the attack, significant infrastructure in the city was completely destroyed, including 31 apartment buildings, and structures and vehicles in the vicinity of the explosion were seriously damaged. The attack affected 205 people in a total of 95 apartments; The attack killed ten people, and 40 were injured, with women and children among the victims.

Human Rights Watch confirmed that a Scud-B ballistic missile launched by the Armenian army exploded in a neighbourhood, killing ten civilians and injuring another 34. According to HRW, there was a large crater in the city and over twenty buildings were either wrecked or damaged in the city.

=== Fourth attack ===
On 17 October, at approximately 01:00 local time, Azerbaijani authorities stated that Armenian forces had fired Scud missiles at Ganja; journalists reported three powerful explosions in the city. According to a RIA Novosti correspondent, the missiles struck densely populated residential areas of the city, leveling several rows of residential and other buildings, the first being less than two kilometers (1.2 mi) away from the city hall and the second in Kapaz District in the east of the city. Vasily Polonsky, a TV Rain correspondent, stated that there were no military bases and important targets near the places struck by the missiles. According to local authorities, approximately 20 houses were destroyed, trapping many civilians under the rubble. Search and rescue teams of the Azerbaijani Ministry of Emergency Situations and servicemen of the Azerbaijani Ministry of Defense arrived at the scene and called in sniffer dogs to rescue the wounded and recover the dead.

As a result of the attack, 15 civilians were killed, including a 13-year-old Russian citizen, and 55 were injured.

Human Rights Watch confirmed that Armenian forces had used Scud-B ballistic missiles on two residential neighbourhoods in Ganja at about 1 a.m. which resulted in the deaths of 21 civilians, including five who died from their injuries following the attack. At the scene, they saw ten houses demolished and more than twenty damaged. Nearly at the same time as the attack, a second Scud-B missile struck another neighbourhood in the city. 15 family residences were destroyed or rendered uninhabitable by the attack, while 40 to 50 others were damaged. Human Rights Watch saw a sizable crater, numerous residential structures that were either damaged or destroyed, and scattered ordnance remains near the scene of the attack.

== Azerbaijani response ==
On October 14, Azerbaijan stated that several operational-tactical missile systems positioned by Armenian forces in the border zone with Azerbaijan's Kalbajar region had been eliminated as a preventative measure to prevent a missile strike similar to the one carried out in Ganja.

== Reactions ==
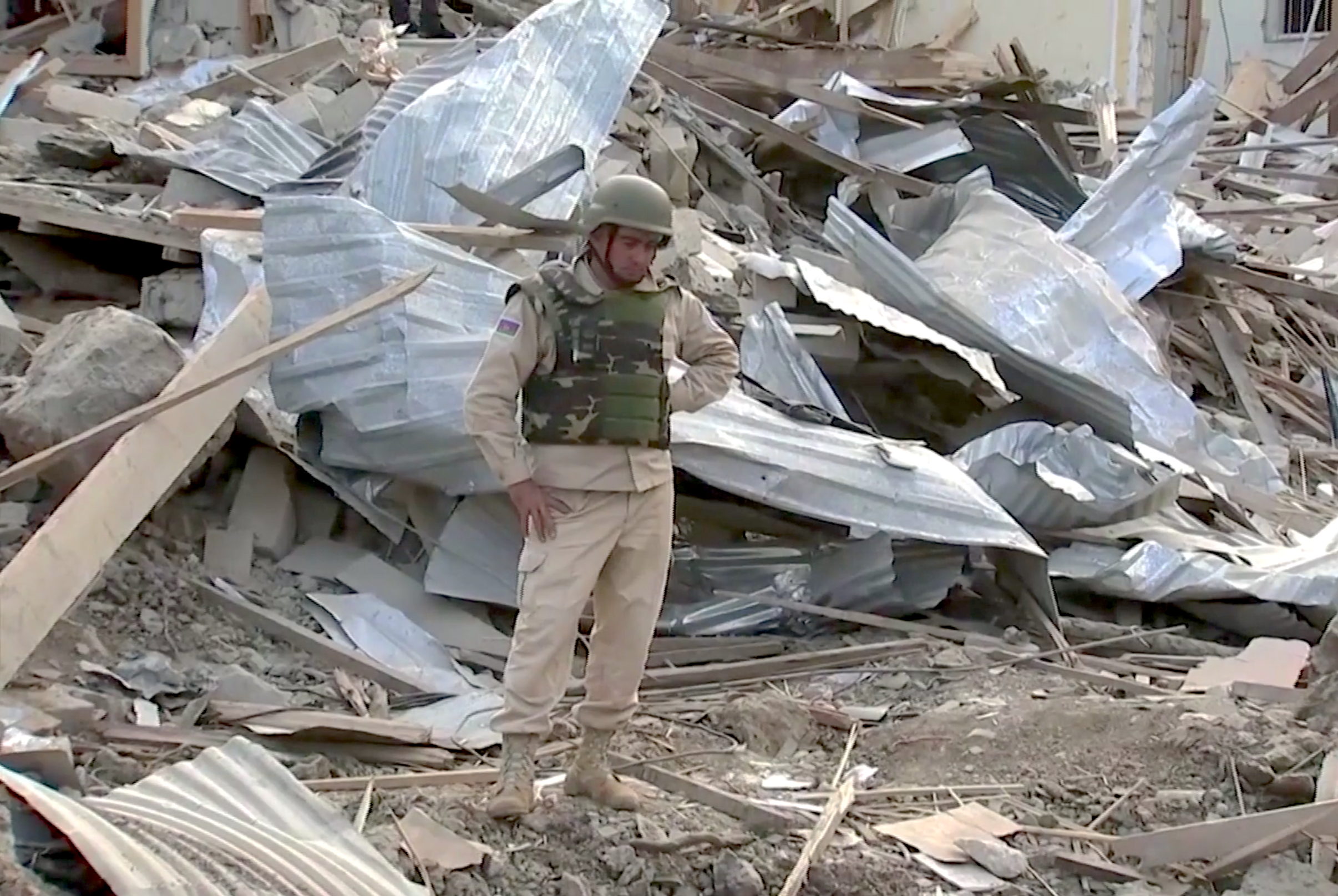
An ANAMA employee standing among the ruins of destroyed residential buildings in Ganja after the Armenian ballistic missile attacks

The attacks were strongly condemned by the Azerbaijani government, which labeled the third attack "an act of genocide against the Azerbaijani people we have witnessed since the Khojaly Massacre". President Ilham Aliyev described the third attack as a war crime and a "gross" violation of the ceasefire, promising a "befitting retaliation". He also described the fourth attack as a war crime and promised to retaliate, adding that Azerbaijan would "punish" Armenia if the international community did not react, while the Azerbaijani ombudsman Sabina Aliyeva accused Armenia of supporting terrorism.

Internationally, the third and fourth attacks were condemned by Turkey, which described the latter as a war crime. The Qatari, Malay, Swiss, British, and Japanese ambassadors to Azerbaijan expressed their condolences for the third attack, while the European Union condemned the fourth attack and UN Secretary-General António Guterres described it as unacceptable. Artsakh authorities, who had called for Ganja to be evacuated, published a list mentioning military targets within the city.

On 16 October, Azerbaijanis, Iranian Azerbaijanis, and Turks living in the United Kingdom gathered in front of Amnesty International's London headquarters and held a protest rally, condemning the Armenian Armed Forces' shelling of residential areas and civilians in Ganja, Mingachevir, Tartar, and other regions. The next day, Azerbaijani Americans held a rally in Chicago, condemning the ballistic missile attacks. The following day, British Azerbaijanis commemorated those killed during the attacks in front of the Azerbaijani embassy in London, while Georgian Azerbaijanis held a rally in front of the Parliament Building in Tbilisi. The same day, Russian Azerbaijanis dedicated part of the entrance of Azerbaijan's embassy to Russia in Moscow to the memory of the victims of the 17 October attack.

On November 23, Aziz Sancar, a Nobel laureate in chemistry from Turkey, transferred a significant amount of money to a specially created bank account to cover the future education expenses of Khadija Shahnazarova, a toddler who lost both her parents in the 17 October attack.

== Legal proceedings ==
Following the Azerbaijani offensive in September 2023, Azerbaijani Prosecutor-General Kamran Aliyev issued arrest warrants on 1 October against Arayik Harutyunyan and military commander Jalal Harutyunyan, for their roles in the attacks. On 3 October 2023, one day before the anniversary of the first attack, the State Security Service of Azerbaijan detained Arayik Harutyunyan.

== See also ==
- 2020 bombardment of Stepanakert
