= Qaşaltı Qaraqoyunlu =

- Municipality
- Location within Azerbaijan
- Coordinates: 40°29′25″N 46°46′41″E
- Country: Azerbaijan
- District: Goranboy

Population
  - Total: 721
- Time zone: UTC+4 (AZT)
  - Summer (DST): UTC+5 (AZT)

Qaşaltı Qaraqoyunlu (Gashalty Garagoyunlu or simply Gashalty) is a village and municipality in the Goranboy District of Azerbaijan. It has a population of 721.
