= Mine Action Agency (Azerbaijan) =

State agency in Azerbaijan

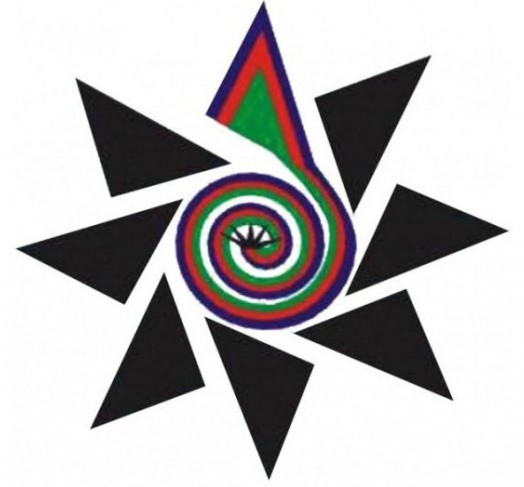
The logo of the agency

Azerbaijan National Agency for Mine Action was established on July 18, 1998 by Order No. 854 of the Great Leader Heydar Aliyev.

The Agency commenced its operations within the framework of the Joint Program on Mine Action in Azerbaijan, between the Government of Azerbaijan and UNDP on April 2, 1999.

According to the Decree No. 1251 of the President of the Republic of Azerbaijan dated January 15, 2021, Mine Action Agency of the Republic of Azerbaijan (ANAMA) was established as a public legal entity on the basis of the Azerbaijan National Agency for Mine Action.

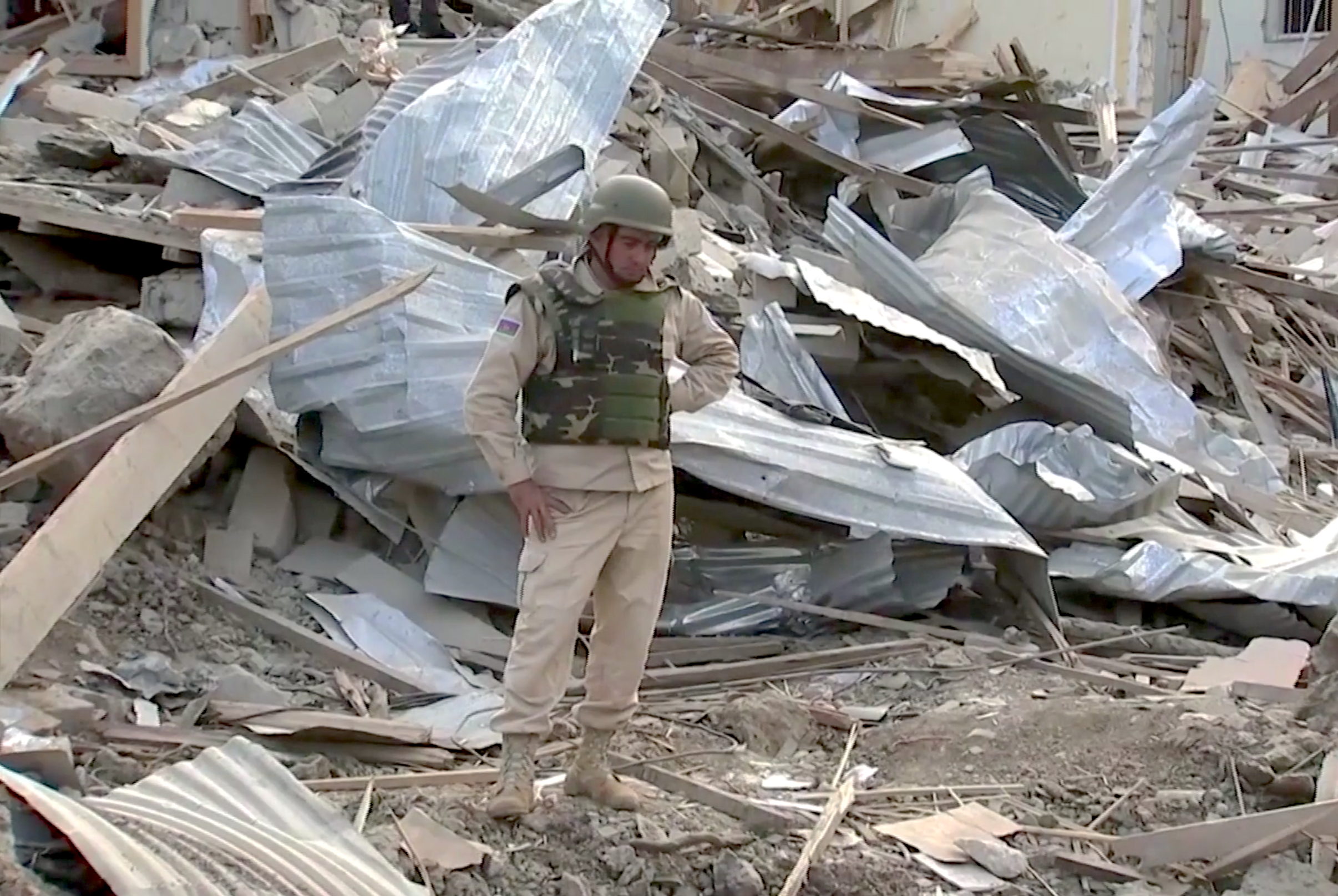
An ANAMA employee standing among the ruins of a destroyed residential building in Ganja after an Armenian missile attack

The Mine Action Agency of the Republic of Azerbaijan became responsible for the clearance of mines, unexploded ordnance, and other explosive residues (except for chemical weapons) found in the territories freed from occupation, as well as other areas affected by war and military operations, including but not limited to performing temporary storage, transportation, neutralization, as well as organization of other necessary activities, planning, coordination and management of activities.

At the same time, ANAMA is the main executive body for the coordination and management of the demining activities carried out within the country.

As part of its humanitarian demining activities, ANAMA adheres to International Mine Action Standards (IMAS).

From 1998 to November 10, 2020, ANAMA cleared total area of 543,094,633 sqm and discovered 809,328 mines and unexploded ordnance.

== Vision ==
Our principal aim is to eliminate landmines and explosive munitions from the territories in the Republic of Azerbaijan that have been impacted by war and military operations, and have been liberated from occupation. Through this effort, we seek to facilitate socio-economic and humanitarian development in our country.

== Mission ==
Our objective is to effectively organize and coordinate demining operations with the aim of clearing the territories in the Republic of Azerbaijan from landmines and other explosive munitions.

== Indicators ==
In accordance with the priorities and deadlines set by the Cabinet of Ministers of Azerbaijan

- Mobilise the necessary resources to address the mine action in accordance with the national needs and priorities;
- Coordinate inter-agency efforts for safely clearing mines from de-occupied and war-torn areas;
- Increase human resources, knowledge and skills of staff, material and technical support;
- Continue to conduct research, clear mines from the territories, and hand them over to the end user;
- Provide awareness to citizens regarding the dangers of explosive munitions to reduce mine and UXO incidents;
- Convey Azerbaijan's mine problem to the world, and strengthen mutually beneficial cooperation with international organizations and donor organizations towards combating the mine threat.
