= Sabina Aliyeva =

Azerbaijani politician

- Səbinə Əliyeva
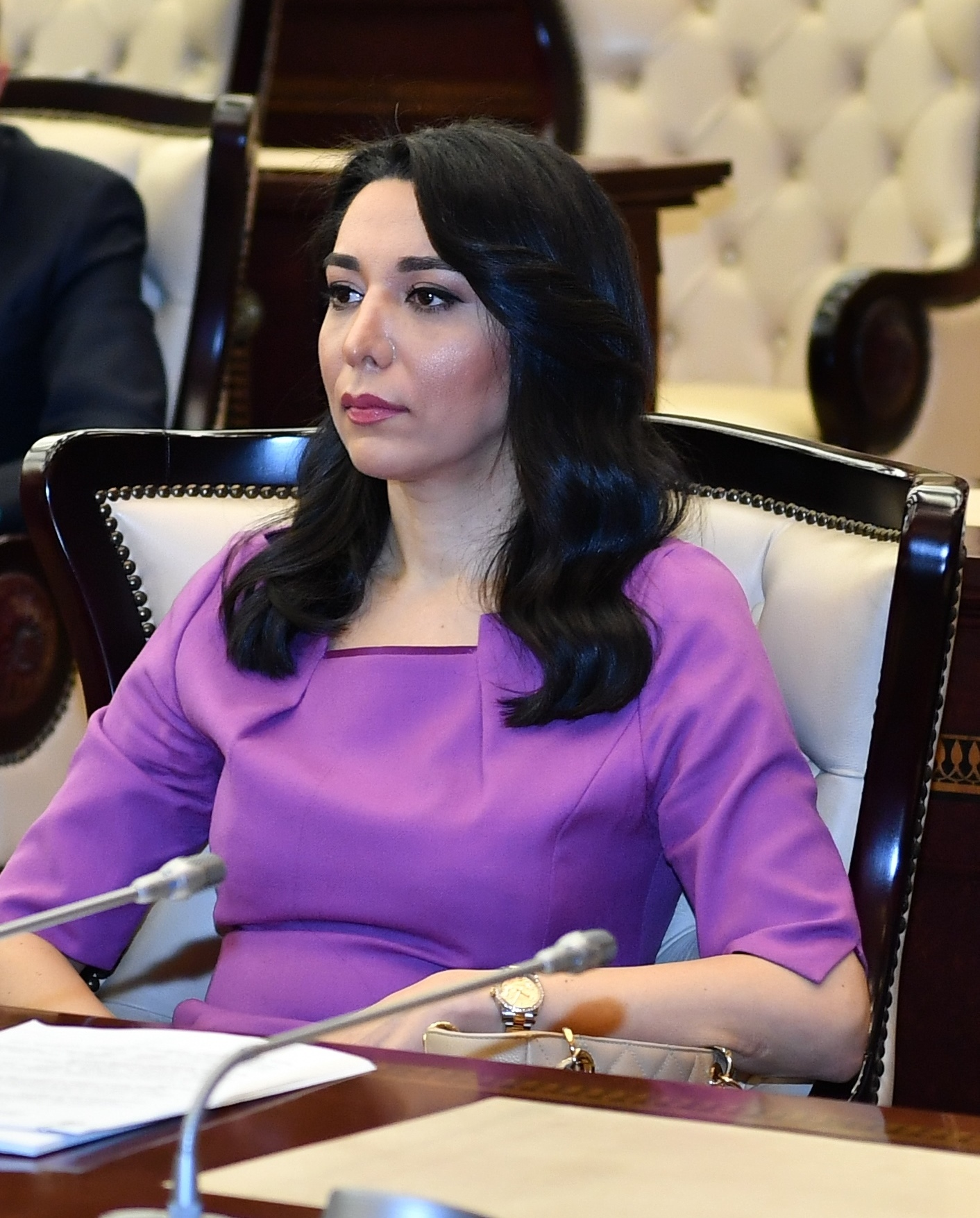
- Aliyeva in 2020

2nd Ombudsman
- Incumbent
- Assumed office November 29, 2019
- President: Ilham Aliyev
- Preceded by: Elmira Süleymanova

Personal details
- Born: May 7, 1980 (age 46) Baku, Azerbaijan SSR, Soviet Union
- Education: Baku State University

Sabina Yashar gizi Aliyeva (Azerbaijani: Səbinə Yaşar qızı Əliyeva; born May 7, 1980), is an Azerbaijani civil servant, the Commissioner for Human Rights (Ombudsman) of the Azerbaijan Republic (since 2019).

== Biography ==
Sabina Aliyeva was born in Baku on May 7, 1980. In 1996, she entered the Law Faculty of Baku State University and graduated in 2000. In 2002, she obtained a Master's degree in State Law. From 2009 to 2012, S.Aliyeva studied International Relations at the Academy of Public Administration under the President of the Republic of Azerbaijan, and in 2016 she obtained a PhD in Law. She defended a thesis in International Law and Human Rights.

She received the qualification of “State Counselor of the 3rd rank” according to the Order of the President of the Republic of Azerbaijan dated June 21, 2016.

On November 29, 2019, Sabina Aliyeva was elected as the Commissioner for Human Rights (Ombudsman) of the Republic of Azerbaijan by the Milli Mejlis (Parliament) (National Assembly) among three candidates presented for this position by the President of the Republic of Azerbaijan.

Aliyeva is married and has two children. Her husband is a Member of the National Assembly of Azerbaijan Siyavush Novruzov.

She was awarded with the medal "For Services in the field of Military Cooperation" on behalf of the President of the Republic of Azerbaijan by the relevant order of the Minister of Defense of the Republic of Azerbaijan dated December 29, 2020.

== Activities ==
=== Socio-public activities ===
- On September 12, 2023, Sabina Aliyeva was elected as the Vice President of the Asian Ombudsmen Association (AOA) during the 17 th General Assembly held in Kazan, Republic of Tatarstan, Russian Federation.
- On October 6, 2023, she was elected as a Board Member of the Ombudsman
- Association of the Organization of Islamic Cooperation (OIC OA) during the OICOA General Assembly held in Istanbul, Republic of Türkiye.
- She is a mentor of the “Yüksəliş” (Rise) competition established in accordance with the Order of the President of the Republic of Azerbaijan.
- Within the framework of the competence to make proposals to the President regarding pardoning issues in line with Article 1.7 of the Constitutional Law on the Commissioner for Human Rights (Ombudsman) of the Republic of Azerbaijan, Sabina Aliyeva regularly participates in the meetings of the Commission on Pardon Issues under the President of the Republic of Azerbaijan.
- She was appointed as a member of the COP29 Organising Committee established by the Presidential Order No. 4264 dated January 13, 2024.

=== Activities during the Garabagh war (2020-2023) ===
During the Tovuz battles, Sabina Aliyeva conducted monitoring visits to Aghdam and Dondar Gushchu villages in Tovuz district, as well as to Gazakh and Aghstafa districts, to investigate human rights violations resulting from provocations committed by Armenia at the state border.

During the Second Garabagh War, Sabina Aliyeva conducted fact-finding missions in Naftalan, Tartar, Ganja, Barda, and surrounding settlements where civilian facilities were attacked. In the course of the war, 7 reports, 8 statements, 12 appeals, and 3 video messages were prepared, and more than 50 press releases were published and also conveyed to the international community in English.

Participation of the foreign delegations - including the Ombudsman Institution of Türkiye, Ombudsman Association of the Organization of Islamic Cooperation (OIC), Human Rights and Equality Institution of Türkiye, OIC Independent Permanent Human Rights Commission in the fact-finding missions to Ganja, Tartar, as well as the liberated territories was directly organized upon Sabina Aliyeva’s initiative. Reports developed as a result of those missions were presented to the international community. In 2023, Sabina Aliyeva publicly responded to the statement of the CoE Secretary General in relation to the Lachin-Khankendi road, stating that this position doesn’t reflect the reality.

She addressed appeals and protest statements to the UN High Commissioner for Human Rights, the Executive Director of UNICEF, CoE Commissioner for Human Rights by referring to the norms and principles of international law to draw attention to the facts and demand a decisive international response to the human rights violations committed against Azerbaijanis.

=== Responses to the biased attitudes against Azerbaijan ===
In 2023, she criticized the opinions of Luis Moreno Ocampo, former chief prosecutor of the International Criminal Court, regarding Azerbaijan, noting that his statements contained legal and historical mistakes. Commenting on the US religious freedom report for 2024, she emphasized that religious tolerance and multiculturalism are implemented at the level of state policy in Azerbaijan.

=== The Association of Ombudsmen and National Human Rights Institutions of Turkic States ===
Based on the initiative of the Ombudspersons of Azerbaijan and Türkiye, the Association of Ombudsmen and National Human Rights Institutions of Turkic States (TÜRKOMB) was founded in 2022 in Bursa, Türkiye. Ombudspersons and heads of national human rights institutions from Azerbaijan, Türkiye, Kazakhstan, Uzbekistan, and Kyrgyzstan signed the Memorandum of Understanding on the establishment of the TÜRKOMB.

== Awards and Medals ==
- “For Distinction in Public Service” according to the Order of the President of the Republic of Azerbaijan, June 27, 2013.
- “State Counselor of the 3rd rank” according to the Order of the President of the Republic of Azerbaijan, June 21, 2016.
- The Medal “For Services in the field of Military Cooperation” on behalf of the President of the Republic of Azerbaijan by the relevant Order of the Minister of Defense of the Republic of Azerbaijan, December 29, 2020.
- The Anniversary Badge for her service in the Trade Union Movement by the Executive Committee of the Confederation of Trade Unions of Azerbaijan, February 28, 2021.
- The Jubilee Medal of the Republic of Azerbaijan “The 30th anniversary of the State Customs Committee of the Republic of Azerbaijan (1992-2022)” by the relevant Order of the Chairman of the State Customs Committee of the Republic of Azerbaijan, January 24, 2022.
- The Jubilee Medal of the Republic of Azerbaijan "The 15th anniversary of the Ministry of Defense Industry of the Republic of Azerbaijan (2005-2020)" by the relevant Order of the Minister of Defense Industry, February 2, 2022.
- The Jubilee Medal of the Republic of Azerbaijan "The 10th anniversary of the State Agency for Public Service and Social Innovations under the President of the Republic of Azerbaijan (2012-2022)" by the relevant Order of the Chairman of the State Agency for Public Service and Social Innovations under the President of the Republic of Azerbaijan, January 23, 2023.
- The Anniversary Badge of “ACTU-30” by the Confederation of Trade Unions of Azerbaijan, January 30, 2023.
- The Jubilee Medal of the Republic of Azerbaijan "The 100th anniversary of Supreme Court of Azerbaijan (1923-2023)", February 2, 2023.
- The Jubilee Medal of the Republic of Azerbaijan "30th Anniversary of the body ensuring the security of the President of the Republic of Azerbaijan (1993-2023)", August 21, 2023.
- The Jubilee Medal of the Republic of Azerbaijan “The 100th Anniversary of Heydar Aliyev (1923-2023)”, by the relevant Order of the President of the Republic of Azerbaijan, February 2, 2024.

== Links ==
- Official website of Ombudsman of Azerbaijan
