= Qaraçanlı =

Qaraçanlı or Garachanly (Persian: قره‌چان‌لی) may refer to:

- Aşağı Qaraçanlı, Kalbajar, Azerbaijan
- Baş Qaraçanlı, Kalbajar, Azerbaijan
- Orta Qaraçanlı, Kalbajar, Azerbaijan
- Mozqaraçanlı, Kalbajar, Azerbaijan
- Qaraçanlı, Lachin, Azerbaijan
