= Abdullauşağı =

Abdullaushaghi Abdullauşağı
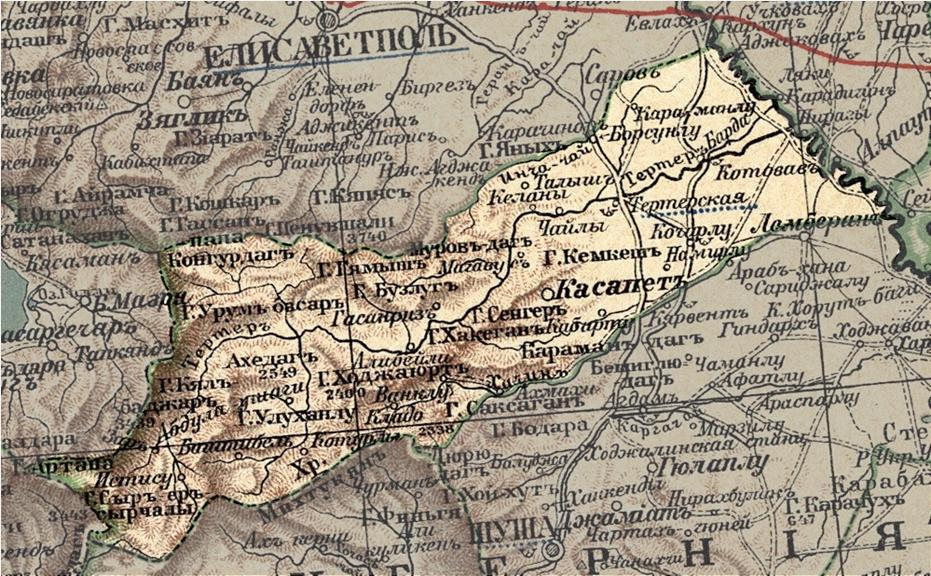
- The village of Abdullaushaghi as part of the Javanshir district on the map of 1903
- Interactive map of Abdullaushaghi
- Rayon: Kalbajar
- Time zone: UTC+4 (AZT)

Abdullaushaghi (Azerbaijani: Abdullauşağı) is a village located in the Kalbajar district of Azerbaijan. It is situated on the Lesser Caucasus Mountains on the Mozchay River in the southwestern part of the Zulfugarly Range at an altitude of 1779 m.

== History ==
Initially it was called Shahsevenler. Founded in the late 19th century by Abdullah, a native of the Aghjabadi village of Shahsevan.

Since 1869, the village was part of the Javanshir district of Elizavetpol province. According to the "Caucasian Calendar" of 1912, 62 Tatars (later known as Azerbaijanis) lived in the village.

According to the publication "Administrative Division of the ASSR", prepared in 1933 by the Department of National Economic Accounting of the Azerbaijan SSR (AzNEA), as of 1 January 1933, 269 people (45 households, 134 men and 135 women) lived in the village of Abdullaushaghy of Zulfugarly village council, Kalbajar district, Azerbaijan SSR. The ethnic composition of the entire Zulfugarly village council, which also included the villages of Aghyatak, Chorman, Fetallar, Mozkand, Garaguney and others, was 99.3% Turks (Azerbaijanis).

On 25 November 2020, based on the trilateral agreement between Azerbaijan, Armenia and Russia dated with 10 November 2020, concluded after the end of the Second Karabakh War, Kalbajar district was returned under the control of Azerbaijan.
