= Nəbilər, Kalbajar =

Nəbilər
- Location within Azerbaijan Location within East Zangezur Economic Region
- Coordinates: 40°06′07.3″N 46°13′20.8″E
- Country: Azerbaijan
- District: Kalbajar
- Elevation: 1,612 m (5,289 ft)
- Time zone: UTC+4 (AZT)

Nəbilər (Nabilar, formerly known as Quşyuvası (Note: anglicized as Gushyuvasy)) is a village located in Kalbajar District of Azerbaijan. It is situated at an altitude of 1612 m on the left bank of the Tutkhun River opposite the Almalig village.

== History ==
During the years of the Russian Empire, the village of Gushyuvasy was part of the Javanshir district, Elizavetpol province. According to the "Caucasian Calendar" for 1912, 25 people lived in the village, mostly Tatars, later known as Azerbaijanis.

According to the publication "Administrative Division of the ASSR", prepared in 1933 by the Department of National Economic Accounting of the Azerbaijan SSR (AzNEA), as of 1 January 1933, the settlement of Gushyuvasy was part of Kilsali village council of Kalbajar district, Azerbaijan SSR. The population was made by 81 people (16 households, 43 men and 38 women). The national composition of the entire Kilsali village council, which also included the villages of Jomart, Kilsali, Najafalylar, was 100% Turkic (Azerbaijani).

On 25 November 2020, based on the trilateral agreement between Azerbaijan, Armenia and Russia dated with 10 November 2020, concluded after the end of the Second Karabakh War, Kalbajar district was returned under the control of Azerbaijan.

== Toponym ==
The village was originally named after the forest area called "Gushyuvasy" which means "bird nest". In 1992, it was renamed "Nabilar" in honor of a man named Nabi, who founded the village. The name means "the village of Nabi's descendants."
