= Shurtan =

Shurtan and its variant Şurtan may refer to:

== Shurtan ==
- Shurtan gas field, a natural gas field and natural gas condensate in Uzbekistan
- Shurtan (river), a river in Perm Krai and Sverdlovsk Oblast, Russia, a tributary of the Irgina
- FC Shurtan Guzar, an Uzbek football club
- Shurtan Stadium, also known as Sho'rtan Stadion, the official home of FC Shurtan Guzar

== Şurtan ==
- Şurtan (also, Shurtan), a village in the Kalbajar Rayon of Azerbaijan
- Aşağı Şurtan, (also, Ashagy Shurtan), a village in the Kalbajar Rayon of Azerbaijan.
- Yuxarı Şurtan (also, Yukhary Shurtan), a village in the Kalbajar Rayon of Azerbaijan

== See also ==
- Al-Shorta (disambiguation)
- Shurta
