= Allıkənd, Kalbajar =

Allikand Allıkənd
- Interactive map of Allikand
- Rayon: Kalbajar
- Time zone: UTC+4 (AZT)

Allikand (Azerbaijani: Allıkənd) is a village located in the Kalbajar district of Azerbaijan. It is situated on the Lesser Caucasus Mountains at an altitude of 1640 m.

== History ==
As part of Russia, the village was part of the Javanshir district of the Elizavetpol province. According to the "Caucasian Calendar" of 1912, 110 people lived in Allikand village, mostly Tatars (later known as Azerbaijanis).

According to the publication "Administrative Division of the ASSR", prepared in 1933 by the Department of National Economic Accounting of the Azerbaijan SSR (AzNEA), as of 1 January 1933, 321 people lived in the village of Allikand which was part of Kalbajar village council of Kalbajar district of Azerbaijan SSR (80 households, including 26 common and 54 individual; 166 men and 155 women). The national composition of the entire Kalbajar village council, which also included the settlements of Airimbinasi, Atallar, Boyagli, Daragishlag, Yukhari Gishlag, Kalbajar, Kilsalikand, Mammadushaghi, Shekerallar, was 90.3% Turks (Azerbaijani).

On 25 November 2020, based on the trilateral agreement between Azerbaijan, Armenia and Russia dated with 10 November 2020, Kalbajar district returned under the control of Azerbaijan.
