= Alçalı =

Alçalı may refer to:

- Alçalı, Salyan, a village in the Salyan Rayon of Azerbaijan
- Alçalı, Kalbajar, a village in the Kalbajar Rayon of Azerbaijan
- Ağbulaq, Kalbajar, a village in the Kalbajar Rayon of Azerbaijan, known as Alçalı until 2015
- Günəşqaya, a village in the Kalbajar Rayon of Azerbaijan, known as Alçalı until 2015
