= Qalaboyun =

Qalaboyun or Galaboyun or Kalaboyun or Kalaboyunlar may refer to:

- Qalaboyun, Kalbajar, a village in the Kalbajar District of Azerbaijan
- Qalaboyun, Tovuz, a village in the Tovuz District of Azerbaijan

== See also ==
- Qaraboyunlar, a village in Çobansığnaq, Tovuz Rayon, Azerbaijan
