= Mishni =

Mishni may refer to:

- Mishni, Iran
- Mişni, Kalbajar, Azerbaijan
- Mişni, Lachin, Azerbaijan
