= Dəmirçidam =

- Location within Azerbaijan Location within East Zangezur Economic Region
- Coordinates: 40°13′15″N 46°04′23″E
- Country: Azerbaijan
- District: Kalbajar
- Time zone: UTC+4 (AZT)

Dəmirçidam (Damirchidam) is a village in the Kalbajar District of Azerbaijan.

A native of Demirchidam is the Azerbaijani poet and storyteller Ashig Shamshir.

== Geography ==
It is situated 28 km north of the district center of Kalbajar. The nearest neighbouring villages are Seyidlar (to the west) and Jamilli (to the north).

== History ==
Damirchidam was founded in the early 19th century by people originary from Shinikh (the modern Gadabay district of Azerbaijan). Later, the villages of Aghdaban and Chaygovushan of the modern Kalbajar district were founded by people from Damirchidam.

According to the materials of the publication “Administrative division of the ASSR”, prepared in 1933 by the Department of National Economic Accounting of the ASSR (AzNEA), as of 1 January 1933, Damirchidam was one of the villages of Seyidlar village council of Kalbajar district of Azerbaijan SSR. The population was 256 people (50 households, 110 men and 146 women). The national composition of the entire Seyidlar village council, which also included the settlements (Babashlar, Chakhli, Jamilli, Lev, Ganlykand, Seyidlar – the center, Takaqaya) was 99.7% Turkic (Azerbaijani).

According to the information of 1960s, the village of Damirchidam was populated by an ethnographic group of Azerbaijanis - Ayrums.

During the Karabakh conflict, the village was occupied by Armenian Armed Forces on 1992.

Before the occupation of the village, the main occupations of the residents were animal husbandry, beekeeping and tobacco growing. The infrastructure included a secondary school, kindergarten, club, library, cultural center, and medical center.

According to the Trilateral Statement signed on the night of 9–10 November 2020, following the results of the Second Karabakh War, the village came under the control of the control of Azerbaijan.
