= Almalyk =

Almalyk, Almalıq or Almaliq may refer to:

- Olmaliq, formerly "Almalyk", a city in Uzbekistan
- Almaliq, Xinjiang, a medieval city in China
- Almalıq, a village in Azerbaijan
