= Başkənd, Azerbaijan =

Başkənd, Azerbaijan may refer to:

- Başkənd, Kalbajar
- Başkənd, Nakhchivan
