= Hasanlar =

Hasanlar can refer to:

- Həsənlər
- Hasanlar Dam
- Hasanlar, Bartın
- Hasanlar, Çine
- Hasanlar, Dursunbey
- Hasanlar, Düzce
- Hasanlar, Gerede
- Hasanlar, Göynük
