= Mercimek =

Mercimek may refer to

Places

- Mərcimək, a village in Azerbaijan
- Mercimek, Ceyhan, a neighbourhood of the municipality and district of Ceyhan, Adana Province, Turkey
- Mercimek, Pertek, a village in Turkey

People

- Mercimek Ahmed (died after 1432), Ottoman author
- Baki Mercimek (born 1982), Turkish football player
