= İstibulaq =

- Location within Azerbaijan Location within East Zangezur Economic Region
- Coordinates: 40°10′31″N 46°03′01″E
- Country: Azerbaijan
- Rayon: Kalbajar
- Time zone: UTC+4 (AZT)
  - Summer (DST): UTC+5 (AZT)

İstibulaq (Istibulak) is a village in the Chaykend municipality of the Kalbajar District of Azerbaijan.

The village was occupied by the Armed Forces of Armenia in 1993 during the First Nagorno-Karabakh War. It was returned to Azerbaijan on 25 November 2020.
