= Orta Şurtan =

- Location within Azerbaijan Location within East Zangezur Economic Region
- Coordinates: 39°58′00″N 45°57′00″E
- Country: Azerbaijan
- District: Kalbajar
- Elevation: 1,731 m (5,679 ft)
- Time zone: UTC+4 (AZT)
  - Summer (DST): UTC+5 (AZT)

Orta Şurtan (Orta Shurtan) is a village in the Kalbajar District of Azerbaijan.

== See also ==
- Aşağı Şurtan – Lower Şurtan
- Yuxarı Şurtan – Upper Şurtan
