= Armudlu, Azerbaijan =

Armudlu, Azerbaijan may refer to:

- Armudlu, Kalbajar, Azerbaijan
- Armudlu, Qakh, Azerbaijan
