= Molotov =

Molotov is commonly referred to:

- Vyacheslav Molotov (1890–1986), Soviet politician and diplomat, and foreign minister under Joseph Stalin
  - Molotov cocktail, a hand-held incendiary weapon

Molotov or Molotow may also refer to:

== Arts and entertainment ==
=== Music ===
- Molotov (band), a Mexican rock/rap band
- Molotov Movement, a Danish hip-hop collective
- The Molotovs, an English rock band
- Molotov, 1998 EP by The Bruisers
- "Molotov", single by Kira Puru, 2018
- "Molotov", by Front Line Assembly from WarMech, 2018
- "Molotov [ok]", by Stand Atlantic from F.E.A.R., 2021

=== Other ===
- Sergei Molotov, video game character from Empire Earth
- Molotov Cocktease, a character in The Venture Bros. TV series

== Places ==
- Oktyabrkənd, Azerbaijan, city formerly named Molotov
- Perm, Russia, city named Molotov between 1940 and 1957 in honour of Vyacheslav Molotov
- Molotow Club, a music venue in Hamburg, Germany

== Other uses ==
- Soviet cruiser Molotov, a 1939 warship
- Vyacheslav Molotov, a Iosif Stalin-class passenger ship
- Molotov bread basket, a Soviet-made bomb dispenser used in the Winter War
