= Böyükdüz =

Böyükdüz or Boyukduz may refer to:

- Böyükdüz, Kalbajar, a village in the Kalbajar District of Azerbaijan
- Böyükdüz, Kangarli, a village in the Kangarli District of Azerbaijan
