= Çopurlu, Azerbaijan =

Çopurlu
- Location within Azerbaijan Location within East Zangezur Economic Region
- Coordinates: 40°15′07″N 46°06′13″E
- Country: Azerbaijan
- Rayon: Kalbajar
- Elevation: 1,513 m (4,964 ft)
- Time zone: UTC+4 (AZT)
  - Summer (DST): UTC+5 (AZT)

Çopurlu (or Chopurlu) is a village in the Kalbajar Rayon of Azerbaijan. From 1993 to 2020, the village was occupied by Armenian forces. However, it was returned to Azerbaijan on 25 November 2020 as part of the 2020 Nagorno-Karabakh ceasefire agreement.

== Geography ==
Çopurlu is located on the banks of the Levçay, at the foot of the Murovdağ range; it is also located 20 km (12 mi) north of Kalbajar.

== Etymology ==
The former name of the village was Çopur Hüseynli. According to the local population, the settlement was named after Chopur Huseyn, who moved from Qabaqtəpə of the Dashkasan District. The Çopurlu tribe was registered in Qaymaqlı of Qazakh District. For this reason, it is also possible that oikonym is an ethnotoponym.

== History ==
During the First Nagorno-Karabakh War, Çopurlu was occupied by Armenian forces on 3 April 1993. The district was declared a part of the self-proclaimed Republic of Artsakh as part of Shahumyan Province, although it continued to be recognized by United Nations as a territory of the Republic of Azerbaijan.

Under the terms of the agreement that ended the 2020 Nagorno-Karabakh War, Çopurlu as with most of the Kelbajar district, returned to Azerbaijani control. Initially, it to be returned to Azerbaijani control by 15 November 2020, but this deadline was subsequently extended to 25 November 2020. In the early hours of 25 November, Azerbaijani forces entered the village.
