= Yellidzha =

Yellidzha may refer to:

- Bayburd, Armenia
- Yellicə, Azerbaijan
