= Chapli =

Chapli may refer to

- Çəpli, a town in Azerbaijan
- Chapli, an Indian form of sandal or slipper
- Chapli kebab, a type of kebab originating from Peshawar, Pakistan
- a neighborhood in Dnipro, Ukraine
