= Chirkin =

Chirkin (Russian: Чиркин) is a Russian masculine surname, its feminine counterpart is Chirkina. It may refer to

- Grigori Chirkin (born 1986), Russian football player
- Vladimir Chirkin (born 1955), Russian military officer

== See also ==
- Gyuzeychirkin
