= Çobankərəhməz =

- Location within Azerbaijan Location within East Zangezur Economic Region
- Coordinates: 40°01′11″N 46°13′18″E
- Country: Azerbaijan
- Rayon: Kalbajar
- Elevation: 1,683 m (5,522 ft)
- Time zone: UTC+4 (AZT)
  - Summer (DST): UTC+5 (AZT)

Çobankərəhməz (also, Choban-Karikl’yev and Chobankerakhmez) is a village in the Kalbajar Rayon of Azerbaijan.
