= Nadirxanlı =

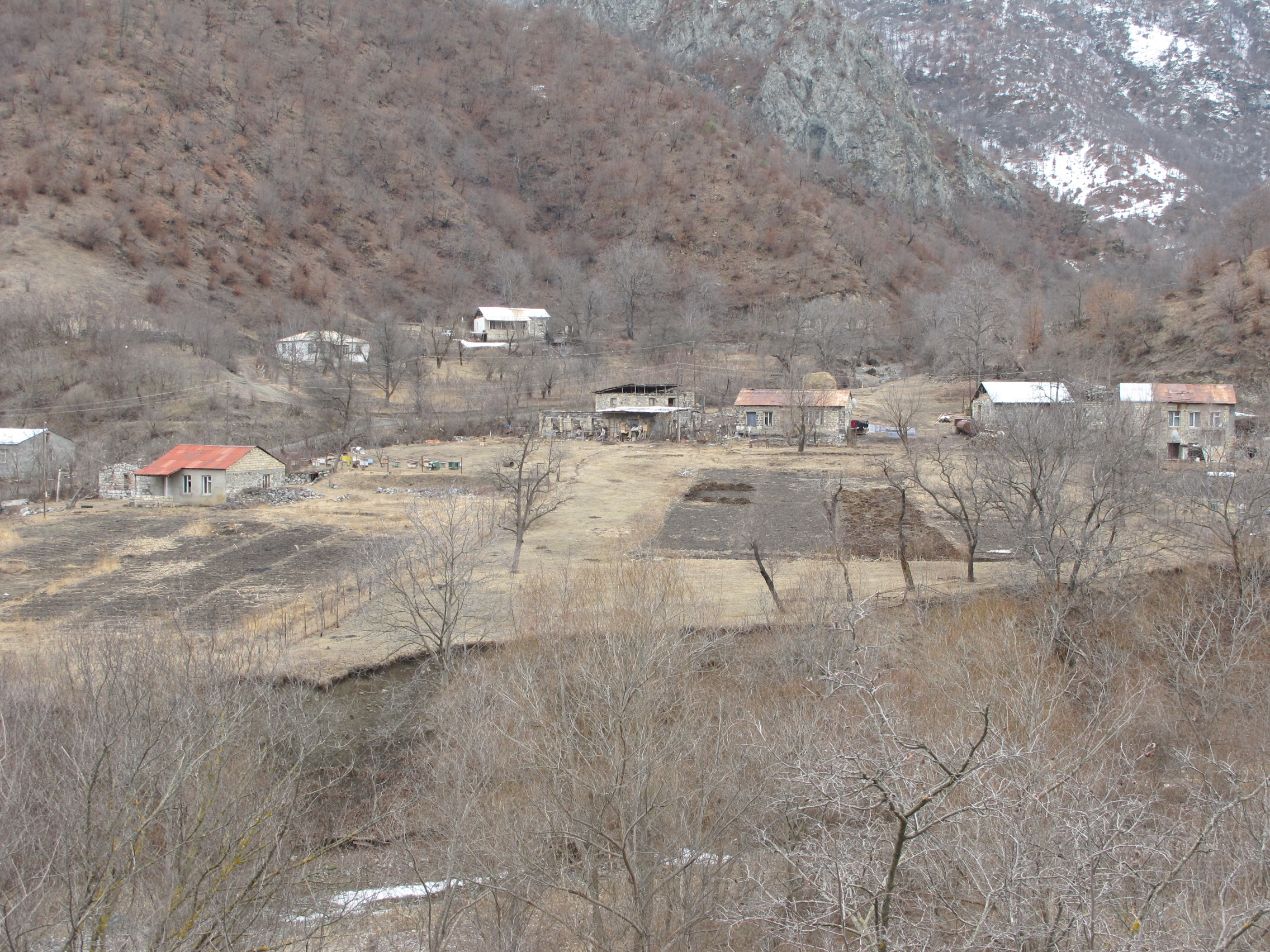

- Location within Azerbaijan Location within East Zangezur Economic Region
- Coordinates: 40°11′01″N 46°09′32″E
- Country: Azerbaijan
- District: Kalbajar

Population (2015)
  - Total: 267
- Time zone: UTC+4 (AZT)

Nadirxanlı (Nadirkhanly) is a village in the Kalbajar District of Azerbaijan.

== History ==
The village was located in the Armenian-occupied territories surrounding Nagorno-Karabakh, coming under the control of ethnic Armenian forces during the First Nagorno-Karabakh War in the early 1990s. The village subsequently became part of the breakaway Republic of Artsakh as part of its Shahumyan Province, referred to as Nor Getashen (Armenian: Նոր Գետաշեն). It was returned to Azerbaijan as part of the 2020 Nagorno-Karabakh ceasefire agreement.

== Demographics ==
The village had 215 inhabitants in 2005, and 267 inhabitants in 2015.

== Gallery ==
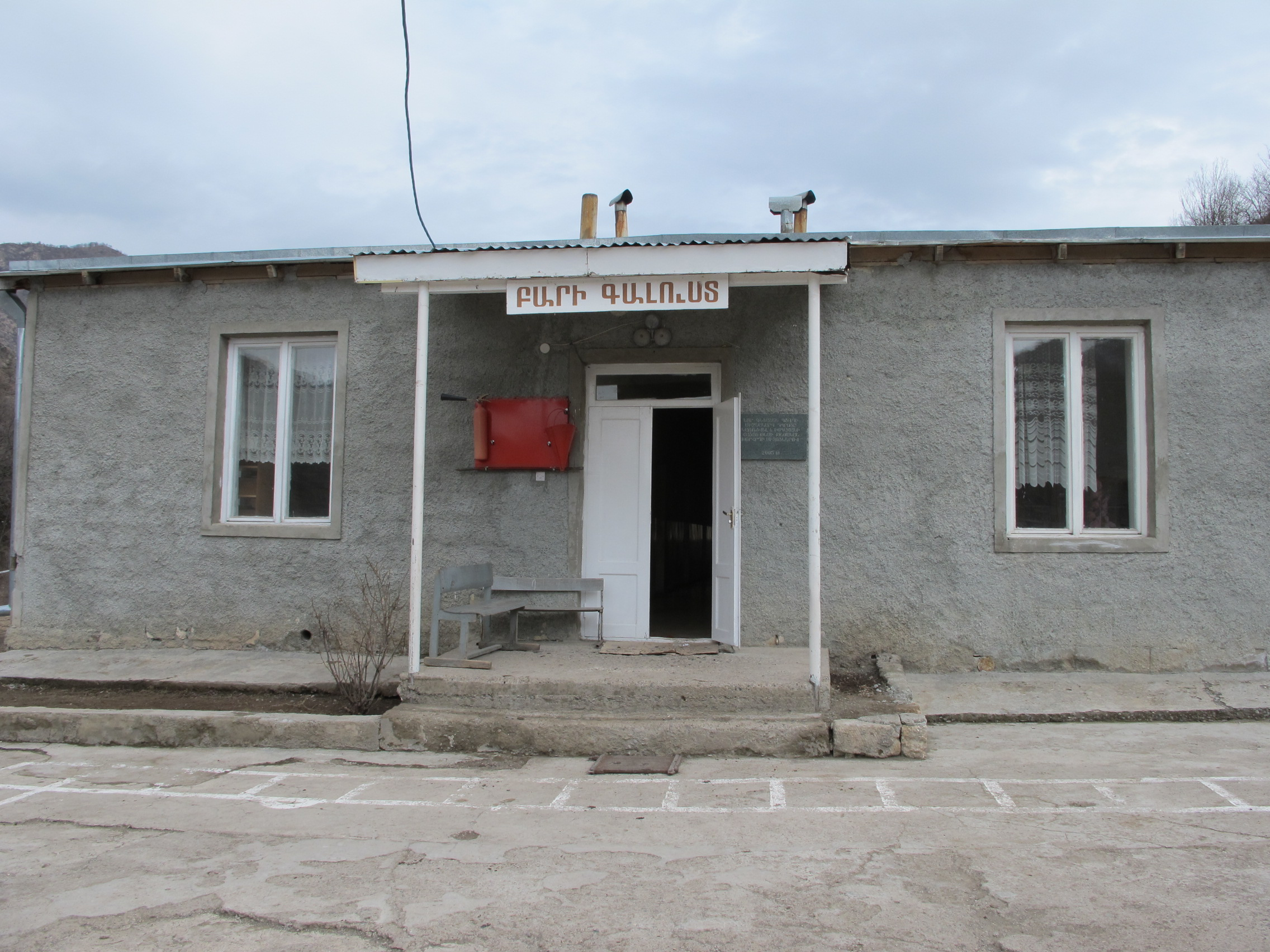
Village school
