= Şahkərəm, Kalbajar =

Şahkərəm
- Location within Azerbaijan Location within East Zangezur Economic Region
- Coordinates: 39°57′32″N 46°11′22″E
- Country: Azerbaijan
- Rayon: Kalbajar
- Time zone: UTC+4 (AZT)
  - Summer (DST): UTC+5 (AZT)

Şahkərəm (also, Şəkərəm and Shahkaram) is a village in the Kalbajar Rayon of Azerbaijan.
