= Hacıdünyamalılar =

- Location within Azerbaijan Location within East Zangezur Economic Region
- Coordinates: 39°59′50.4″N 45°57′50.3″E
- Country: Azerbaijan
- District: Kalbajar
- Time zone: UTC+4 (AZT)
  - Summer (DST): UTC+5 (AZT)

Hacıdünyamalılar (Hajidunyamalilar, formerly known as Vəng) is a village in the Kalbajar District of Azerbaijan.
