= Mollabayramlı =

- Location within Azerbaijan Location within East Zangezur Economic Region
- Coordinates: 39°59′07″N 45°56′28″E
- Country: Azerbaijan
- District: Kalbajar
- Time zone: UTC+4 (AZT)
  - Summer (DST): UTC+5 (AZT)

Mollabayramlı (Mollabayramli, formerly known as Ali Bayramli (Azerbaijani: Əli Bayramlı)) is a village in the Kalbajar Rayon of Azerbaijan.
