= Zivel =

Mollabayramli
- Location within Azerbaijan Location within East Zangezur Economic Region
- Coordinates: 39°58′44″N 45°56′33″E
- Country: Azerbaijan
- District: Kalbajar
- Time zone: UTC+4 (AZT)
  - Summer (DST): UTC+5 (AZT)

Mollabayramlı is a village in the Kalbajar District of Azerbaijan.
