= Birinci Milli =

- Location within Azerbaijan Location within East Zangezur Economic Region
- Coordinates: 40°06′46″N 46°04′48″E
- Country: Azerbaijan
- Rayon: Kalbajar
- Time zone: UTC+4 (AZT)
  - Summer (DST): UTC+5 (AZT)

Birinci Milli (Birinji Milli) is a village in the Kalbajar District of Azerbaijan.
