= Başlıbel =

- Location within Azerbaijan Location within East Zangezur Economic Region
- Coordinates: 39°58′33″N 46°07′48″E
- Country: Azerbaijan
- Rayon: Kalbajar
- Time zone: UTC+4 (AZT)
  - Summer (DST): UTC+5 (AZT)

Başlıbel (Bashlibel) is a village in the Kalbajar District of Azerbaijan. It is located on the banks of the Bashlibel river.
