= Tövlədərə =

- Location within Azerbaijan Location within East Zangezur Economic Region
- Coordinates: 39°58′N 45°57′E
- Country: Azerbaijan
- District: Kalbajar
- Time zone: UTC+4 (AZT)
  - Summer (DST): UTC+5 (AZT)

Tövlədərə (Tovladara) is a village in the Kalbajar District of Azerbaijan.
