= Alukend =

- Village
- Location within Azerbaijan Location within East Zangezur Economic Region
- Coordinates: 40°06′55″N 46°03′07″E
- Country: Azerbaijan
- District: Kalbajar
- Time zone: UTC+4 (AZT)
  - Summer (DST): UTC+5 (AZT)

Alukend was a village in the Kalbajar District of Azerbaijan.

This village was occupied by the self-proclaimed Nagorno-Karabakh Republic during the First Nagorno-Karabakh war. It was returned to Azerbaijan on 25 November 2020 per the 2020 Nagorno-Karabakh ceasefire agreement, that ended the Second Nagorno-Karabakh war.
