= Zağalar =

- Location within Azerbaijan Location within East Zangezur Economic Region
- Coordinates: 40°01′02.2″N 46°21′24.9″E
- Country: Azerbaijan
- District: Kalbajar
- Elevation: 1,779 m (5,837 ft)

Population (2015)
  - Total: 8
- Time zone: UTC+4 (AZT)

Zağalar (Zaghalar) is a village in the Kalbajar District of Azerbaijan.

== History ==
The village was located in the Armenian-occupied territories surrounding Nagorno-Karabakh, coming under the control of ethnic Armenian forces during the First Nagorno-Karabakh War in the early 1990s. It subsequently became part of the Martakert Province of the breakaway Republic of Artsakh, referred to as Andzavner (Armenian: Անձավներ). It was returned to Azerbaijan as part of the 2020 Nagorno-Karabakh ceasefire agreement.
