= Tağılar, Kalbajar =

Tağılar
- Location within Azerbaijan Location within East Zangezur Economic Region
- Coordinates: 40°08′33.8″N 46°11′41.8″E
- Country: Azerbaijan
- District: Kalbajar
- Time zone: UTC+4 (AZT)
  - Summer (DST): UTC+5 (AZT)

Tağılar (Taghylar; known as Qaragüney until 2015) is a village in the Kalbajar District of Azerbaijan.
