= Bəzirxana =

- Location within Azerbaijan Location within East Zangezur Economic Region
- Coordinates: 40°09′13″N 46°11′32″E
- Country: Azerbaijan
- Rayon: Kalbajar
- Time zone: UTC+4 (AZT)
  - Summer (DST): UTC+5 (AZT)

Bəzirxana (Bazirkhana) is a village in the Kalbajar District of Azerbaijan.
