= Məmmədsəfi =

- Location within Azerbaijan Location within East Zangezur Economic Region
- Coordinates: 39°57′54″N 45°56′54″E
- Country: Azerbaijan
- Rayon: Kalbajar
- Time zone: UTC+4 (AZT)
  - Summer (DST): UTC+5 (AZT)

Məmmədsəfi (Mammadsafi) is a village in the Kalbajar District of Azerbaijan.
