= Rəhimli, Kalbajar =

Rəhimli
- Location within Azerbaijan Location within East Zangezur Economic Region
- Coordinates: 40°09′46.7″N 46°03′59.3″E
- Country: Azerbaijan
- District: Kalbajar
- Time zone: UTC+4 (AZT)
  - Summer (DST): UTC+5 (AZT)

Rəhimli (Rahimli) is a village in the Kalbajar District of Azerbaijan.

== History ==
The village was occupied by Armenian forces during the First Nagorno-Karabakh war and administrated as part of Shahumyan Province of the self-proclaimed Republic of Artsakh.

On 25 November 2020, the village was returned to Azerbaijan per the 2020 Nagorno-Karabakh ceasefire agreement.
