= Yenikənd, Kalbajar =

Yenikənd
- Location within Azerbaijan Location within East Zangezur Economic Region
- Coordinates: 39°58′59.2″N 46°25′17.3″E
- Country: Azerbaijan
- District: Kalbajar
- Time zone: UTC+4 (AZT)
  - Summer (DST): UTC+5 (AZT)

Yenikənd (Yenikend) is a village in the Kalbajar District of Azerbaijan.

== History ==
The village was occupied by Armenian forces during the First Nagorno-Karabakh war and administrated as part of Martakert Province of the self-proclaimed Republic of Artsakh. It was renamed Chrag during its occupation.

On 25 November 2020, the village was returned to Azerbaijan per the 2020 Nagorno-Karabakh ceasefire agreement.
