= Şeyinli =

- Location within Azerbaijan Location within East Zangezur Economic Region
- Coordinates: 40°01′16.0″N 45°57′19.7″E
- Country: Azerbaijan
- District: Kalbajar
- Time zone: UTC+4 (AZT)

Şeyinli (Sheyinli) is a village in the Kalbajar District of Azerbaijan.
