= Xatıncan =

Coordinates: 40°46′N 45°36′E

Xatıncan is a village in the municipality of Qalaboyun in the Tovuz Rayon of Azerbaijan.
