= Otaqlı =

Otagly
- Azerbaijani: Otaqlı
- Location within Azerbaijan Location within East Zangezur Economic Region
- Coordinates: 40°07′18″N 46°01′01″E
- Country: Azerbaijan
- District: Kalbajar
- Time zone: UTC+4 (AZT)
  - Summer (DST): UTC+5 (AZT)

Otaqlı (Otagly) is a ghost village in the Kalbajar District of Azerbaijan.

== History ==
The village was located in the Armenian-occupied territories surrounding Nagorno-Karabakh, coming under the control of ethnic Armenian forces during the First Nagorno-Karabakh War in the early 1990s.

The village subsequently became part of the self-proclaimed Republic of Artsakh as part of its Kashatagh Province.

It was returned to Azerbaijan as part of the 2020 Nagorno-Karabakh ceasefire agreement. Subsequently, Azerbaijani Ministry of Defence published a video from the village, showing the ruined state of the village following its occupation.
