= Hopurlu =

- Location within Azerbaijan Location within East Zangezur Economic Region
- Coordinates: 40°02′19″N 45°58′42″E
- Country: Azerbaijan
- Rayon: Kalbajar
- Time zone: UTC+4 (AZT)
  - Summer (DST): UTC+5 (AZT)

Hopurlu (also, Khopurlu and Opurly) is a village in the Kalbajar Rayon of Azerbaijan.
