= Zərqulu =

- Location within Azerbaijan Location within East Zangezur Economic Region
- Coordinates: 40°00′N 46°12′E
- Country: Azerbaijan
- Rayon: Kalbajar
- Time zone: UTC+4 (AZT)
  - Summer (DST): UTC+5 (AZT)

Zərqulu (Zargulu) is a village in the Kalbajar District of Azerbaijan.
