= Hacıkənd, Kalbajar =

Hajikend
- Azerbaijani: Hacıkənd
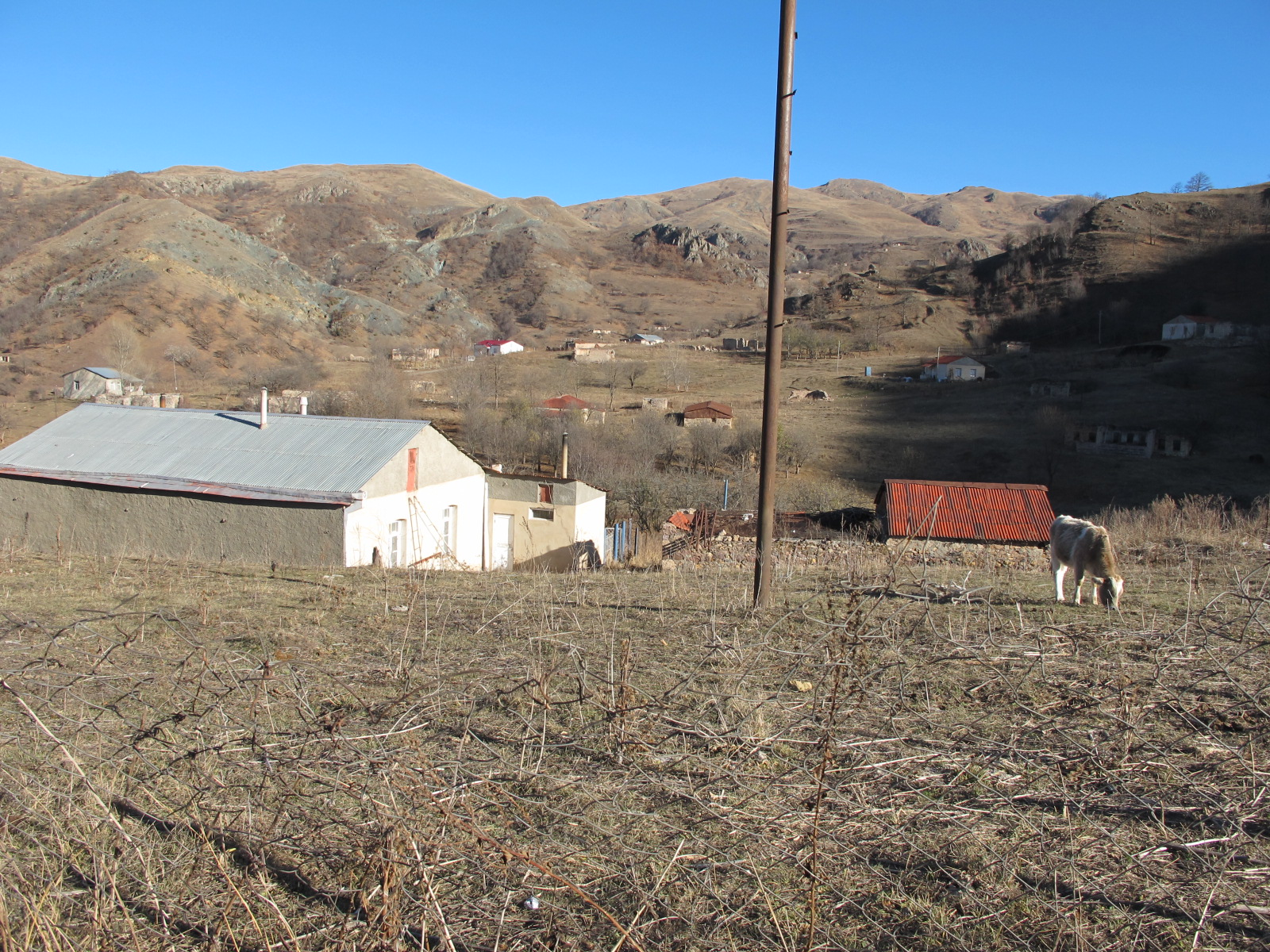

- Location within Azerbaijan Location within East Zangezur Economic Region
- Coordinates: 40°07′47.1″N 46°06′11.6″E
- Country: Azerbaijan
- District: Kalbajar

Population (2015)
  - Total: 97
- Time zone: UTC+4 (AZT)

Hacıkənd (Hajikend; formerly known as Sınıqkilsə) is a village in the Kalbajar District of Azerbaijan.

== History ==
The village was located in the Armenian-occupied territories surrounding Nagorno-Karabakh, coming under the control of ethnic Armenian forces during the First Nagorno-Karabakh War in the early 1990s. The village subsequently became part of the breakaway Republic of Artsakh as part of its Shahumyan Province, referred to as Nor Manashid (Armenian: Նոր Մանաշիդ). It was returned to Azerbaijan as part of the 2020 Nagorno-Karabakh ceasefire agreement.

== Historical heritage sites ==
Historical heritage sites in and around the village include a 12th/13th-century cemetery.

== Demographics ==
The village had 71 inhabitants in 2005, and 97 inhabitants in 2015.
