= Şaplar =

- Location within Azerbaijan Location within East Zangezur Economic Region
- Coordinates: 40°05′54″N 46°03′35″E
- Country: Azerbaijan
- District: Kalbajar
- Time zone: UTC+4 (AZT)
  - Summer (DST): UTC+5 (AZT)

Şaplar (Shaplar) is a village in the Kalbajar District of Azerbaijan.
