= Pirilər =

- Location within Azerbaijan Location within East Zangezur Economic Region
- Coordinates: 40°09′13.7″N 46°11′09.0″E
- Country: Azerbaijan
- District: Kalbajar
- Time zone: UTC+4 (AZT)
  - Summer (DST): UTC+5 (AZT)

Pirilər (Pirilar) is a village in the Kalbajar District of Azerbaijan.
