= Tatlar, Kalbajar =

Tatlar
- Location within Azerbaijan Location within East Zangezur Economic Region
- Coordinates: 40°04′N 46°03′E
- Country: Azerbaijan
- Rayon: Kalbajar
- Time zone: UTC+4 (AZT)
  - Summer (DST): UTC+5 (AZT)

Tatlar is a village in the Kalbajar Rayon of Azerbaijan.
