= Xanməmməd-Bünaən =

- Village
- Location within Azerbaijan Location within East Zangezur Economic Region
- Coordinates: 40°03′35″N 45°59′36″E
- Country: Azerbaijan
- Rayon: Kalbajar
- Time zone: UTC+4 (AZT)
  - Summer (DST): UTC+5 (AZT)

Xanməmməd-Bünaən (Khanmemmed-Bunaen) is a village in the Kalbajar District of Azerbaijan.

The village was occupied by Armenian forces during the First Nagorno-Karabakh war and administrated as part of Shahumyan Province of the self-proclaimed Republic of Artsakh. It was returned to Azerbaijan on 25 November 2020 per the 2020 Nagorno-Karabakh ceasefire agreement. It is suspected that this village has undergone a name change or no longer exists, as no Azerbaijani website mentions it under this name.
