= Üçüncü Milli =

- Location within Azerbaijan Location within East Zangezur Economic Region
- Coordinates: 40°07′08.0″N 46°05′43.4″E
- Country: Azerbaijan
- District: Kalbajar
- Time zone: UTC+4 (AZT)
  - Summer (DST): UTC+5 (AZT)

Üçüncü Milli (Uchunju Milli) (Third National) is a village in the Kalbajar District of Azerbaijan. the village is located in the National Village Administrative Territorial District of Kalbajar District of the Republic of Azerbaijan .

By the Decision No. 123-XII of the Supreme Council of the Republic of Azerbaijan dated May 25, 1991, the Third National Village of Sinıqkilsa Village Council of Kalbajar District was included in the First National Village Council. It was occupied by the Armed Forces of Armenia in 1993. After the tripartite agreement signed by the heads of state of Azerbaijan, Russia and Armenia on November 10, 2020, the Third National Village was evacuated on November 25, 2020.
