= Gözlübulaq =

- Location within Azerbaijan Location within East Zangezur Economic Region
- Coordinates: 40°06′21″N 46°17′21″E
- Country: Azerbaijan
- Rayon: Kalbajar
- Time zone: UTC+4 (AZT)
  - Summer (DST): UTC+5 (AZT)

Gözlübulaq (Gozlubulakh) was a village in the Kalbajar District of Azerbaijan.
