= Oruclu, Kalbajar =

Oruclu
- Location within Azerbaijan Location within East Zangezur Economic Region
- Coordinates: 40°01′31″N 46°09′40″E
- Country: Azerbaijan
- District: Kalbajar
- Time zone: UTC+4 (AZT)
  - Summer (DST): UTC+5 (AZT)

Oruclu (Orujlu) is a village in the Kalbajar District of Azerbaijan.
