= İmanbinəsi =

- Location within Azerbaijan Location within East Zangezur Economic Region
- Coordinates: 40°03′25.9″N 46°01′12.2″E
- Country: Azerbaijan
- District: Kalbajar
- Time zone: UTC+4 (AZT)
  - Summer (DST): UTC+5 (AZT)

İmanbinəsi (Imanbinasi) is a village in the Kalbajar District of Azerbaijan.
