= İlyaslar =

- Location within Azerbaijan Location within East Zangezur Economic Region
- Coordinates: 40°14′21″N 46°06′29″E
- Country: Azerbaijan
- Rayon: Kalbajar
- Elevation: 1,518 m (4,980 ft)
- Time zone: UTC+4 (AZT)
  - Summer (DST): UTC+5 (AZT)

İlyaslar is a village in the Kalbajar District of Azerbaijan.
