= Qasımlar =

- Location within Azerbaijan Location within East Zangezur Economic Region
- Coordinates: 40°08′N 46°06′E
- Country: Azerbaijan
- District: Kalbajar
- Time zone: UTC+4 (AZT)
  - Summer (DST): UTC+5 (AZT)

Qasımlar (Gasymlar; formerly known as Kilsa (Azerbaijani: Kilsə)) is a village in the Kalbajar District of Azerbaijan.
