= Sarıdaş =

- Location within Azerbaijan Location within East Zangezur Economic Region
- Coordinates: 40°11′48″N 46°08′18″E
- Country: Azerbaijan
- Rayon: Kalbajar
- Time zone: UTC+4 (AZT)
  - Summer (DST): UTC+5 (AZT)

Sarıdaş (also, Sarydash) is a village in the Kalbajar Rayon of Azerbaijan.
