= Çayqovuşan, Kalbajar =

Place in Kalbajar, Azerbaijan

Çayqovuşan
- Location within Azerbaijan Location within East Zangezur Economic Region
- Coordinates: 40°11′48.2″N 46°20′30.1″E
- Country: Azerbaijan
- District: Kalbajar
- Time zone: UTC+4 (AZT)

Çayqovuşan (Chaygovushan) is a village in the Kalbajar District of Azerbaijan. Çayqovuşan was one of two villages of Kalbajar forming an enclave inside the Aghdara District.
