= Təzəkənd, Kalbajar =

Təzəkənd
- Location within Azerbaijan Location within East Zangezur Economic Region
- Coordinates: 40°01′08.9″N 46°23′38.1″E
- Country: Azerbaijan
- District: Kalbajar
- Time zone: UTC+4 (AZT)
  - Summer (DST): UTC+5 (AZT)

Təzəkənd (Tazakend, formerly known as Alaqaya) is a village in the Kalbajar District of Azerbaijan.
