= Keçiliqaya =

- Location within Azerbaijan Location within East Zangezur Economic Region
- Coordinates: 40°02′49″N 46°17′33″E
- Country: Azerbaijan
- Rayon: Kalbajar
- Time zone: UTC+4 (AZT)
  - Summer (DST): UTC+5 (AZT)

Keçiliqaya (also, Kechilikaya, Kechili, and Kechilli) is a village in the Kalbajar Rayon of Azerbaijan.
