= Böyürbinə =

- Location within Azerbaijan Location within East Zangezur Economic Region
- Coordinates: 40°09′N 46°04′E
- Country: Azerbaijan
- District: Kalbajar
- Time zone: UTC+4 (AZT)

Böyürbinə (Boyurbina, formerly known as Sarıgüney (Sariguney)) is a village in the Kalbajar District of Azerbaijan.
