= Qaraxançallı =

- Location within Azerbaijan Location within East Zangezur Economic Region
- Coordinates: 39°58′29″N 46°13′10″E
- Country: Azerbaijan
- Rayon: Kalbajar
- Time zone: UTC+4 (AZT)
  - Summer (DST): UTC+5 (AZT)

Qaraxançallı (also, Karakhanchally and Karakhanchilar) is a village in the Kalbajar Rayon of Azerbaijan.
