= Barmaqbinə =

- Location within Azerbaijan Location within East Zangezur Economic Region
- Coordinates: 40°06′30.1″N 45°59′47.5″E
- Country: Azerbaijan
- District: Kalbajar
- Time zone: UTC+4 (AZT)
  - Summer (DST): UTC+5 (AZT)

Barmaqbinə (Barmagbina) is a village in the Kalbajar District of Azerbaijan.
