= Soyuqbulaq, Kalbajar =

Soyuqbulaq
- Location within Azerbaijan Location within East Zangezur Economic Region
- Coordinates: 40°00′35″N 46°00′14″E
- Country: Azerbaijan
- Rayon: Kalbajar
- Elevation: 1,695 m (5,561 ft)
- Time zone: UTC+4 (AZT)
  - Summer (DST): UTC+5 (AZT)

Soyuqbulaq is a village in the Kalbajar Rayon of Azerbaijan.
