= Xallanlı =

- Location within Azerbaijan Location within East Zangezur Economic Region
- Coordinates: 39°58′20″N 46°10′40″E
- Country: Azerbaijan
- Rayon: Kalbajar
- Time zone: UTC+4 (AZT)
  - Summer (DST): UTC+5 (AZT)

Xallanlı (also, Khailanli, Khallanli, and Khanlanli) is a village in the Kalbajar Rayon of Azerbaijan.
