= Çovdar, Kalbajar =

Çovdar
- Location within Azerbaijan Location within East Zangezur Economic Region
- Coordinates: 39°56′59″N 46°09′47″E
- Country: Azerbaijan
- Rayon: Kalbajar
- Time zone: UTC+4 (AZT)
  - Summer (DST): UTC+5 (AZT)

Çovdar (Chovdar) is a village in the Kalbajar District of Azerbaijan.
