= Tirkeşəvənd, Kalbajar =

Tirkeşəvənd
- Location within Azerbaijan Location within East Zangezur Economic Region
- Coordinates: 39°58′11.39″N 46°13′5.40″E
- Country: Azerbaijan
- Rayon: Kalbajar
- Time zone: UTC+4 (AZT)
  - Summer (DST): AZT

Tirkeşəvənd is a village in the Kalbajar Rayon of Azerbaijan.
