= Comərd =

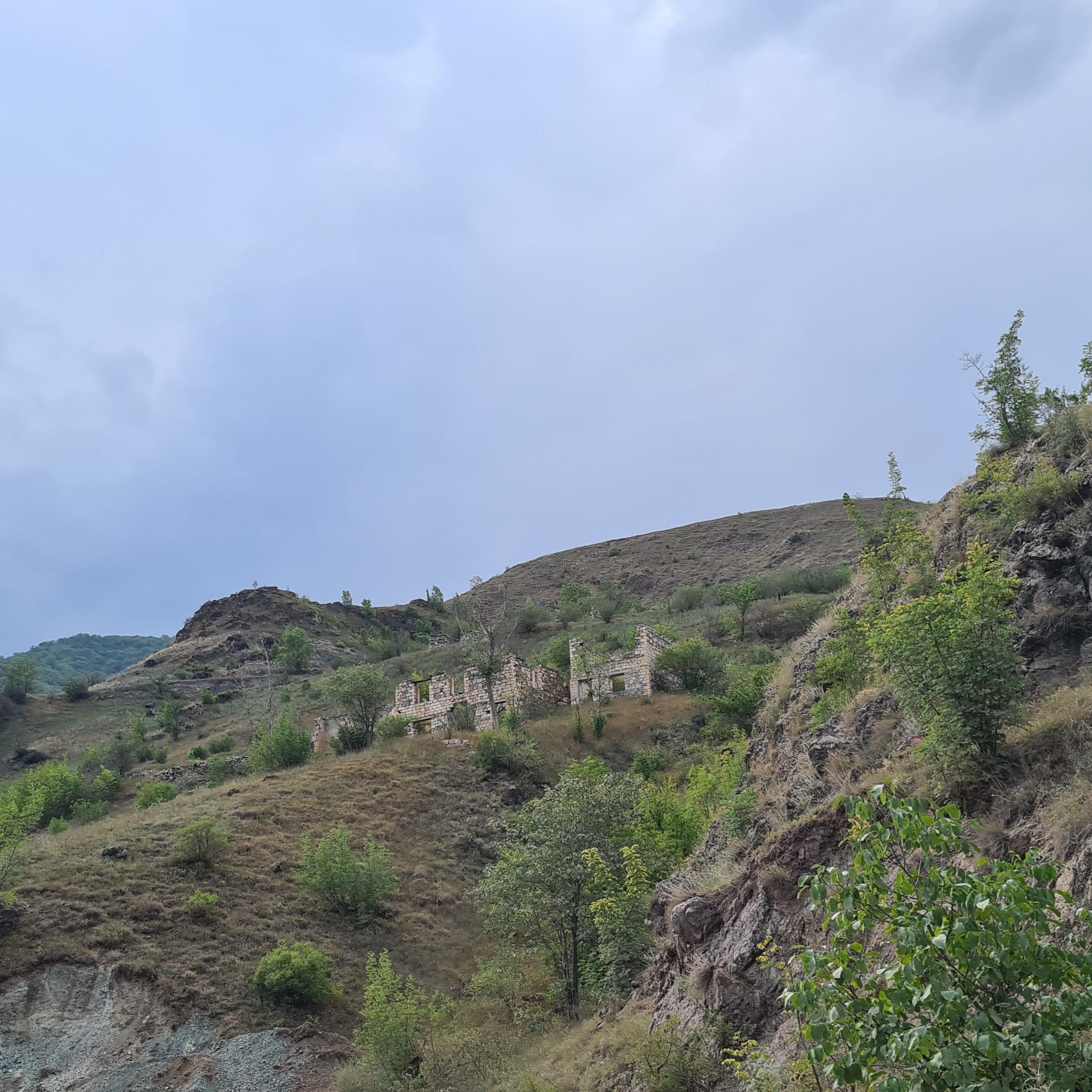

- Location within Azerbaijan Location within East Zangezur Economic Region
- Coordinates: 40°08′09.7″N 46°13′14.0″E
- Country: Azerbaijan
- District: Kalbajar

Population (2014)
  - Total: 3
- Time zone: UTC+4 (AZT)

Comərd (Jomard) is a village in the Kalbajar District of Azerbaijan.

== History ==
The village was located in the Armenian-occupied territories surrounding Nagorno-Karabakh, coming under the control of ethnic Armenian forces during the First Nagorno-Karabakh War in the early 1990s. The village subsequently became part of the breakaway Republic of Artsakh as part of its Shahumyan Province, referred to as Chumen (Armenian: Ճումեն; also Jomard, Ջոմարդ). It was returned to Azerbaijan as part of the 2020 Nagorno-Karabakh ceasefire agreement.

== Gallery ==
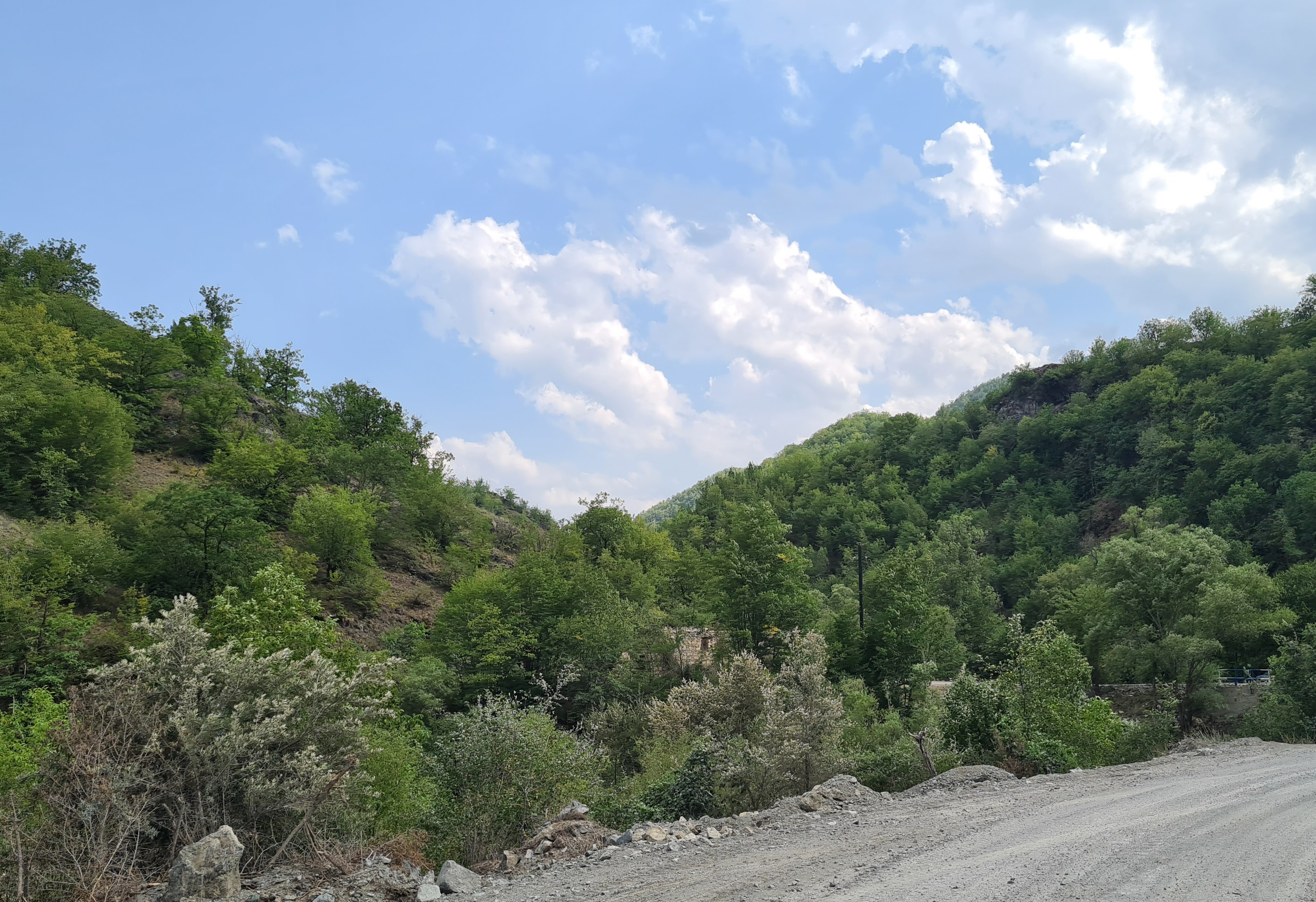
