= Məmməduşağı =

- Location within Azerbaijan Location within East Zangezur Economic Region
- Coordinates: 40°05′04″N 46°02′40″E
- Country: Azerbaijan
- Rayon: Kalbajar
- Time zone: UTC+4 (AZT)
  - Summer (DST): UTC+5 (AZT)

Məmməduşağı (also, Mamedushagy) is a village in the Kalbajar Rayon of Azerbaijan.
