= Qaymaqlı =

- Municipality
- Location within Azerbaijan
- Coordinates: 41°13′26″N 45°08′19″E
- Country: Azerbaijan
- Rayon: Qazakh

Population
  - Total: 2,055
- Time zone: UTC+4 (AZT)
  - Summer (DST): UTC+5 (AZT)

Qaymaqlı (also, Kaymagly and Kaymakhly) is a village and municipality in the Qazakh Rayon of Azerbaijan. It has a population of 2,055.
