= Qalaboyun, Tovuz =

Qalaboyun
- Municipality
- Location within Azerbaijan
- Coordinates: 40°46′N 45°36′E
- Country: Azerbaijan
- Rayon: Tovuz

Population
  - Total: 426
- Time zone: UTC+4 (AZT)
  - Summer (DST): UTC+5 (AZT)

Qalaboyun (also, Kalaboyun and Kalaboyunlar) is a village and municipality in the Tovuz Rayon of Azerbaijan. It has a population of 426. The municipality consists of the villages of Qalaboyun and Xatıncan.
