= Baş Qaraçanlı =

Bash Garachanly
- Azerbaijani: Baş Qaraçanlı
- Location within Azerbaijan Location within East Zangezur Economic Region
- Coordinates: 40°04′00″N 46°11′30″E
- Country: Azerbaijan
- District: Kalbajar
- Elevation: 1,759 m (5,771 ft)
- Time zone: UTC+4 (AZT)
  - Summer (DST): UTC+5 (AZT)

Baş Qaraçanlı (Bash Garachanly) is a village in the Kalbajar District of Azerbaijan.
