= Qaragüney, Kalbajar =

Qaragüney
- Location within Azerbaijan Location within East Zangezur Economic Region
- Coordinates: 40°04′45.8″N 46°15′53.8″E
- Country: Azerbaijan
- District: Kalbajar
- Time zone: UTC+4 (AZT)
  - Summer (DST): UTC+5 (AZT)

Qaragüney (Garaguney) is a village in the Kalbajar District of Azerbaijan.
