= Armudlu, Kalbajar =

Armudlu
- Location within Azerbaijan
- Coordinates: 40°05′N 46°01′E
- Country: Azerbaijan
- Rayon: Kalbajar
- Time zone: UTC+4 (AZT)
  - Summer (DST): UTC+5 (AZT)

Armudlu is a village in the Kalbajar Rayon of Azerbaijan.
