= Seyidlər, Kalbajar =

Seyidlər
- Location within Azerbaijan Location within East Zangezur Economic Region
- Coordinates: 40°14′20.7″N 46°04′04.5″E
- Country: Azerbaijan
- District: Kalbajar

Population (2015)
  - Total: 123
- Time zone: UTC+4 (AZT)

Seyidlər (Seyidlar) is a village in the Kalbajar District of Azerbaijan.

== History ==
The village was located in the Armenian-occupied territories surrounding Nagorno-Karabakh, coming under the control of ethnic Armenian forces during the First Nagorno-Karabakh War in the early 1990s. The village subsequently became part of the breakaway Republic of Artsakh as part of its Shahumyan Province, referred to as Nor Karachinar (Armenian: Նոր Կարաչինար). It was returned to Azerbaijan as part of the 2020 Nagorno-Karabakh ceasefire agreement.

== Demographics ==
The village had 91 inhabitants in 2005, and 123 inhabitants in 2015.
