= Günəşli, Kalbajar =

Günəşli
- Location within Azerbaijan Location within East Zangezur Economic Region
- Coordinates: 40°07′08″N 46°11′21″E
- Country: Azerbaijan
- District: Kalbajar
- Elevation: 1,582 m (5,190 ft)
- Time zone: UTC+4 (AZT)
  - Summer (DST): UTC+5 (AZT)

Günəşli (Gunashli, formerly known as Kilsəli) is a village in the Kalbajar District of Azerbaijan.
