= Nəcafalı =

- Location within Azerbaijan Location within East Zangezur Economic Region
- Coordinates: 40°08′32″N 46°13′14″E
- Country: Azerbaijan
- Rayon: Kalbajar
- Elevation: 1,233 m (4,045 ft)
- Time zone: UTC+4 (AZT)
  - Summer (DST): UTC+5 (AZT)

Nəcafalı (also, Nadzhafalylar and Nadzhafali) is a village in the Kalbajar Rayon of Azerbaijan.
