= Mərcimək =

- Location within Azerbaijan Location within East Zangezur Economic Region
- Coordinates: 40°04′57″N 46°20′15″E
- Country: Azerbaijan
- Rayon: Kalbajar
- Elevation: 1,599 m (5,246 ft)
- Time zone: UTC+4 (AZT)
  - Summer (DST): UTC+5 (AZT)

Mərcimək (Merjimek) is a village in the Kalbajar District of Azerbaijan. The name translates to "Lentil" because lentils were grown there. A local legend claims that two people made a bet that plants could not be grown in that village. The other told the person to plant lentils, and the plant thrived.

== History ==
In 1993, Mərcimək was occupied by the unrecognised Republic of Artsakh in the Nagorno-Karabakh war, and was liberatied by the Azerbaijani Armed Forces in 2020.
