= Çəpli =

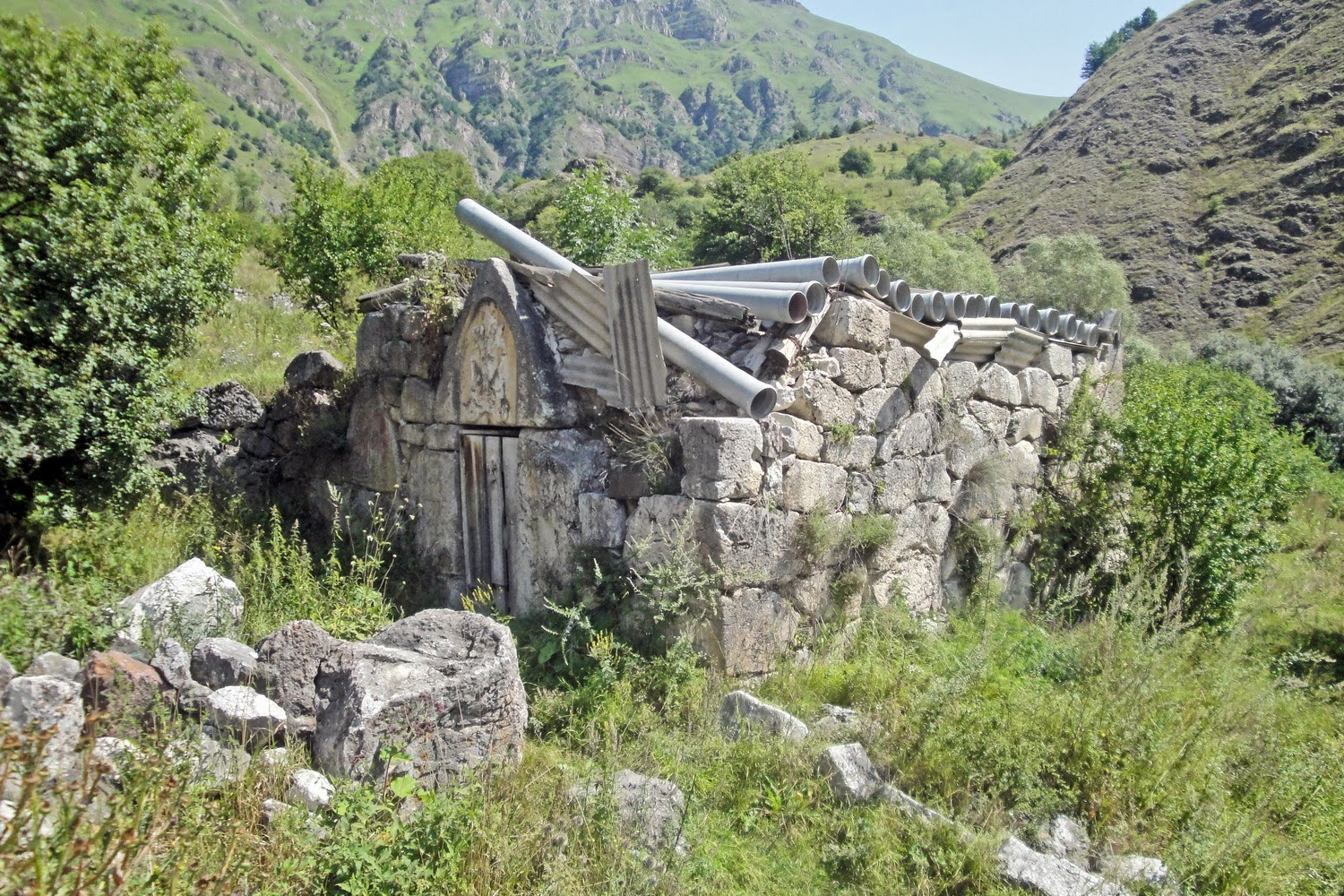
- Church in the village

- Location within Azerbaijan Location within East Zangezur Economic Region
- Coordinates: 40°13′49″N 46°09′54.4″E
- Country: Azerbaijan
- Rayon: Kalbajar
- Time zone: UTC+4 (AZT)

Çəpli (Chapli; Armenian: Չափնի, romanized: Chapni) is a village in the Kalbajar District of Azerbaijan. The village is located in a mountainous area, on the banks of the Lev River.

== Gallery ==
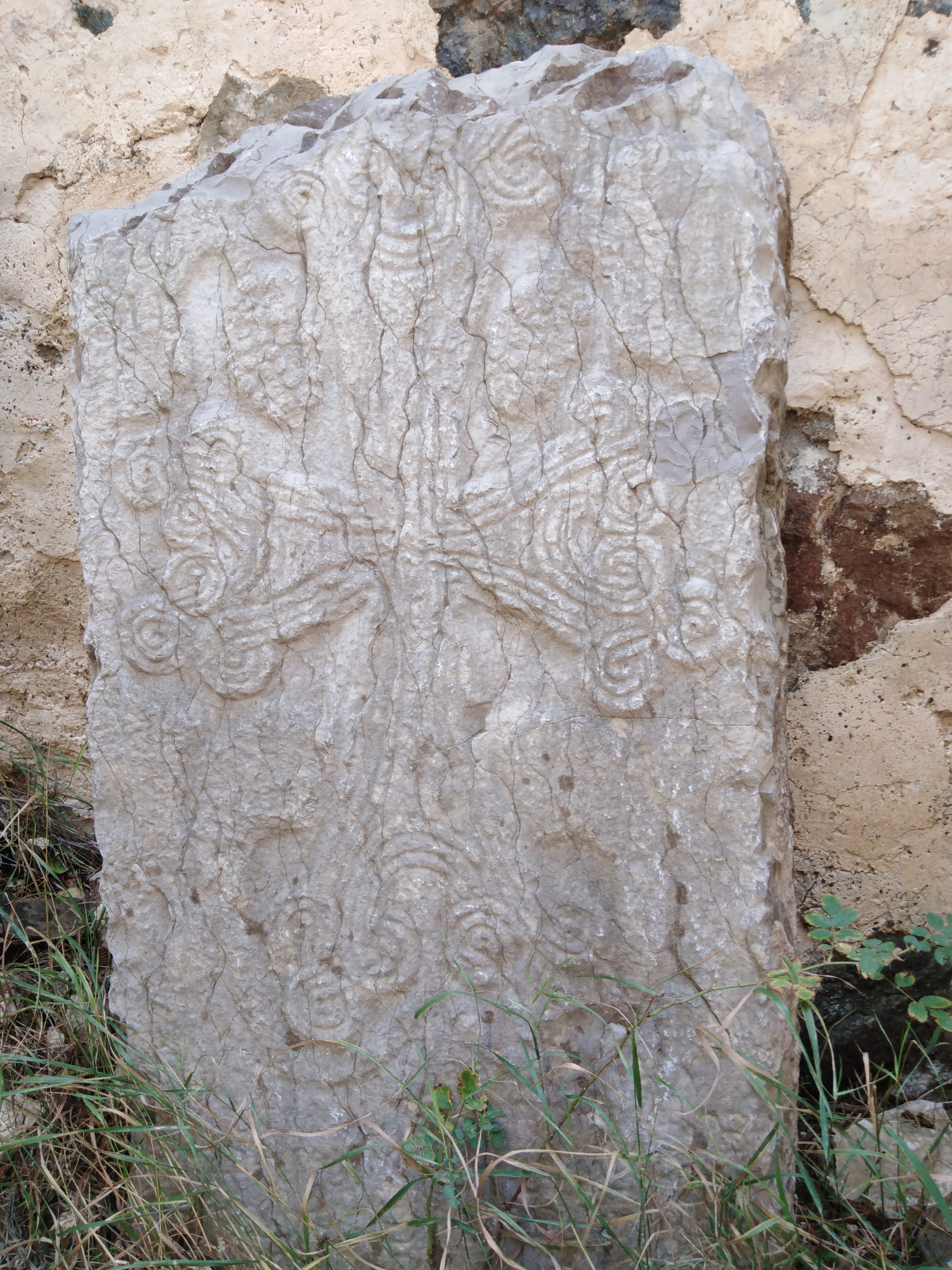

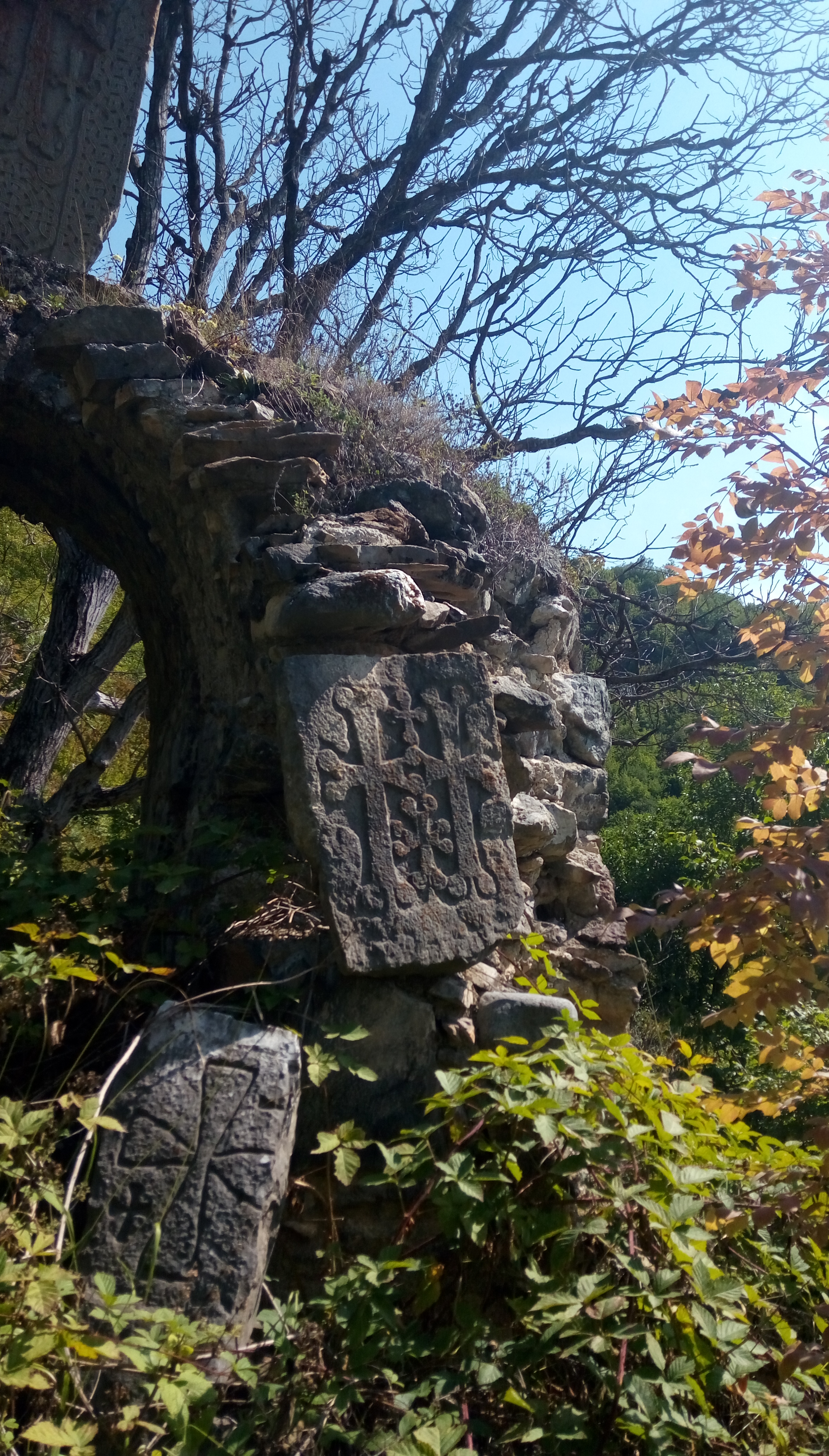

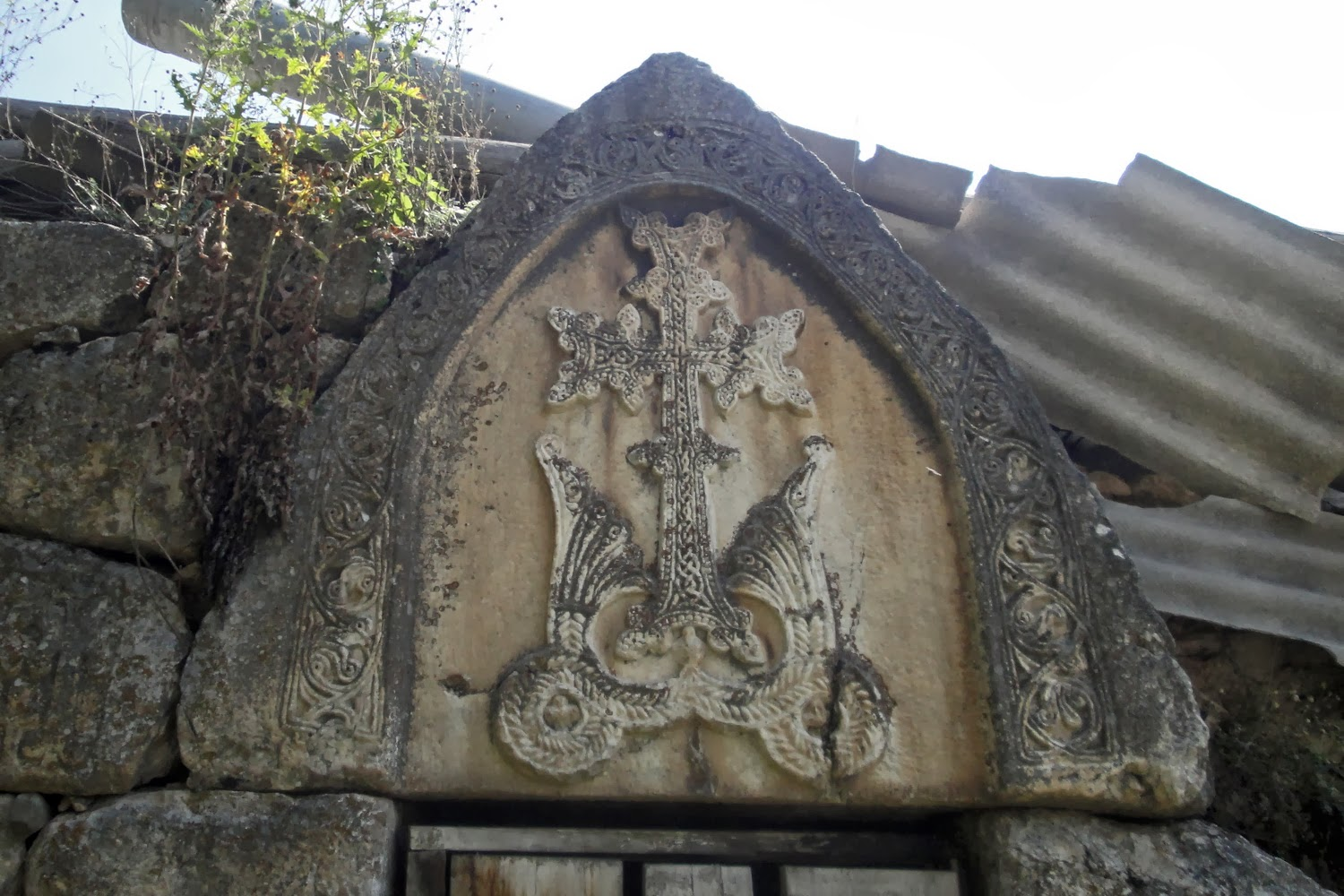
