= Orta Qaraçanlı =

Orta Garachanly
- Azerbaijani: Orta Qaraçanlı
- Location within Azerbaijan Location within East Zangezur Economic Region
- Coordinates: 40°02′06″N 46°02′25″E
- Country: Azerbaijan
- District: Kalbajar
- Time zone: UTC+4 (AZT)
  - Summer (DST): UTC+5 (AZT)

Orta Qaraçanlı (also, Orta Garachanly) is a village in the Kalbajar District of Azerbaijan.
