= Qalaboyun, Kalbajar =

Qalaboyun
- Location within Azerbaijan Location within East Zangezur Economic Region
- Coordinates: 39°57′59.0″N 46°15′02.2″E
- Country: Azerbaijan
- District: Kalbajar
- Time zone: UTC+4 (AZT)
  - Summer (DST): UTC+5 (AZT)

Qalaboyun (Galaboyun) is a village in the Kalbajar District of Azerbaijan.
