= Alçalı, Salyan =

Alçalı
- Municipality
- Location within Azerbaijan
- Coordinates: 39°31′09″N 48°55′12″E
- Country: Azerbaijan
- Rayon: Salyan

Population
  - Total: 600
- Time zone: UTC+4 (AZT)
  - Summer (DST): UTC+5 (AZT)

Alçalı (also Alchaly) is a village and municipality in the Salyan Rayon of Azerbaijan. It has a population of 600.
