= Ağbulaq, Kalbajar =

Ağbulaq
- Location within Azerbaijan Location within East Zangezur Economic Region
- Coordinates: 40°11′06″N 46°07′12″E
- Country: Azerbaijan
- District: Kalbajar
- Time zone: UTC+4 (AZT)
  - Summer (DST): UTC+5 (AZT)

Ağbulaq (Aghbulag; known as Alçalı until 2015) is a village in the Kalbajar District of Azerbaijan.
