= Cəmilli, Kalbajar =

Cəmilli
- Location within Azerbaijan Location within East Zangezur Economic Region
- Coordinates: 40°14′45″N 46°03′55″E
- Country: Azerbaijan
- Rayon: Kalbajar
- Time zone: UTC+4 (AZT)
  - Summer (DST): UTC+5 (AZT)

Cəmilli (Jamilli) is a village in the Kalbajar District of Azerbaijan.

The village is administratively part of Kalbajar District, which lies within the East Zangezur Economic Region.
