= Moz, Kalbajar =

Mozkənd
- Location within Azerbaijan Location within East Zangezur Economic Region
- Coordinates: 40°04′36″N 46°08′18″E
- Country: Azerbaijan
- District: Kalbajar
- Elevation: 1,815 m (5,955 ft)
- Time zone: UTC+4 (AZT)
  - Summer (DST): UTC+5 (AZT)

Moz (also known as Mozkənd) is a village in the Kalbajar District of Azerbaijan.
