= Çorman, Kalbajar =

Çorman
- Location within Azerbaijan Location within East Zangezur Economic Region
- Coordinates: 40°02′04″N 46°15′40″E
- Country: Azerbaijan
- Rayon: Kalbajar
- Time zone: UTC+4 (AZT)
  - Summer (DST): UTC+5 (AZT)

Çorman (also, Chorman) is a village in the Kalbajar Rayon of Azerbaijan.
