= Fətallar =

- Location within Azerbaijan Location within East Zangezur Economic Region
- Coordinates: 40°04′02.0″N 46°09′20.2″E
- Country: Azerbaijan
- District: Kalbajar
- Time zone: UTC+4 (AZT)
  - Summer (DST): UTC+5 (AZT)

Fətallar (Fatallar) is a village in the Kalbajar District of Azerbaijan.

== History ==
The village was occupied by Armenian forces during the First Nagorno-Karabakh war and was administrated as part of Shahumyan Province of the self-proclaimed Republic of Artsakh.

On 25 November 2020, the village was returned to Azerbaijan per the 2020 Nagorno-Karabakh ceasefire agreement.
