= Qaraçanlı, Lachin =

Garachanly قره‌چان‌لی
- Azerbaijani: Qaraçanlı
- Location within Azerbaijan Location within East Zangezur Economic Region
- Coordinates: 39°44′20″N 46°23′28″E
- Country: Azerbaijan
- District: Lachin
- Time zone: UTC+4 (AZT)
  - Summer (DST): UTC+5 (AZT)

Qaraçanlı (also, Garachanly; Persian: قره‌چان‌لی) is a village in the Lachin District of Azerbaijan.
