= Çaykənd, Kalbajar =

Çaykənd
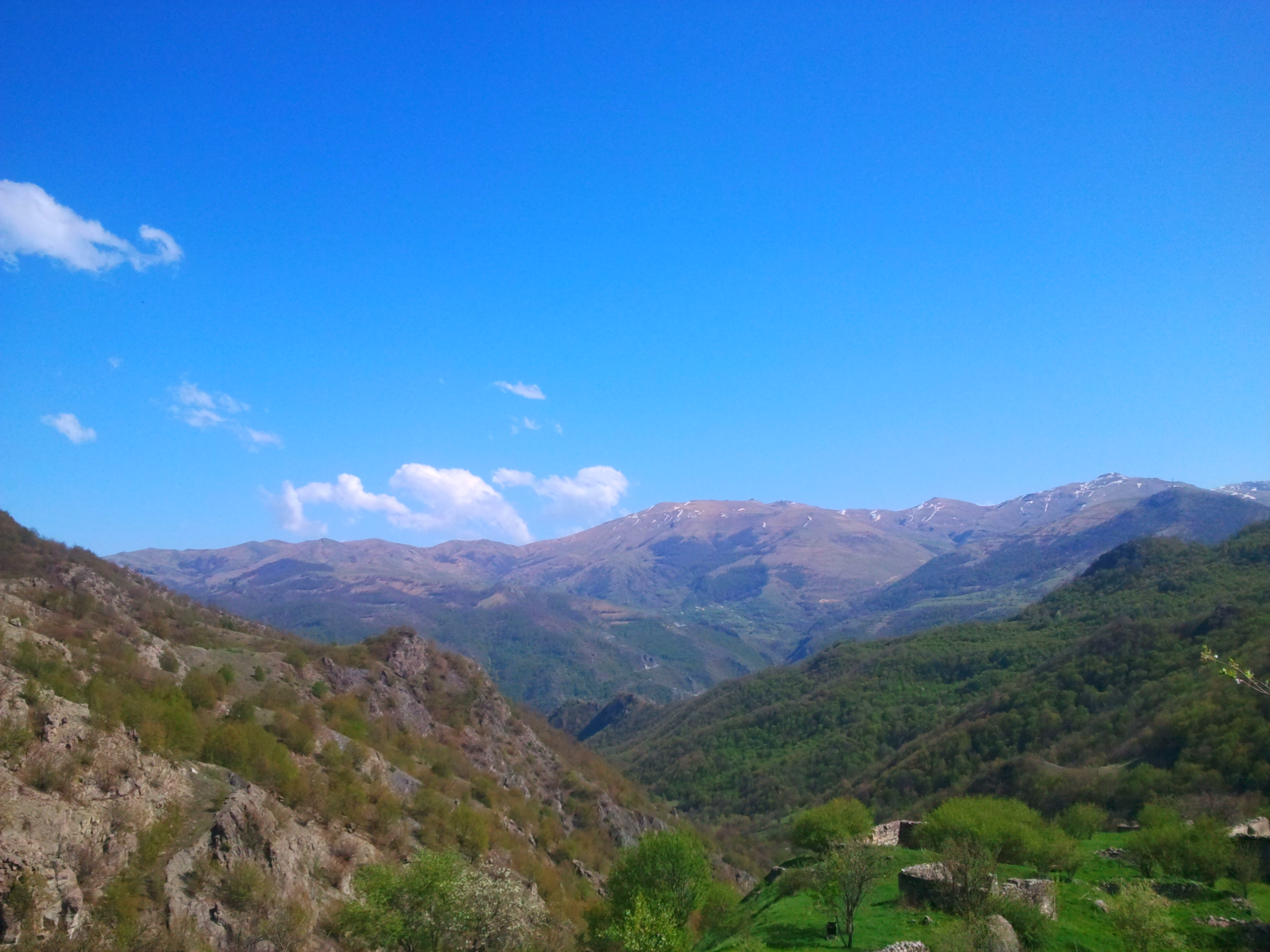

- Location within Azerbaijan Location within East Zangezur Economic Region
- Coordinates: 40°08′55.8″N 46°05′12.1″E
- Country: Azerbaijan
- District: Kalbajar
- Elevation: 1,618 m (5,308 ft)

Population (2015)
  - Total: 267
- Time zone: UTC+4 (AZT)

Çaykənd (Chaykend) is a village in the Kalbajar District of Azerbaijan.

== History ==
The village was located in the Armenian-occupied territories surrounding Nagorno-Karabakh, coming under the control of ethnic Armenian forces during the First Nagorno-Karabakh War in the early 1990s. The village subsequently became part of the breakaway Republic of Artsakh as part of its Shahumyan Province, referred to as Nor Verinshen (Armenian: Նոր Վերինշեն). It was returned to Azerbaijan on 25 November 2020 as part of the 2020 Nagorno-Karabakh ceasefire agreement.

== Historical heritage sites ==
Historical heritage sites in and around the village include a 12th/13th-century khachkar.

== Demographics ==
The village had 200 inhabitants in 2005, and 267 inhabitants in 2015.

== Gallery ==
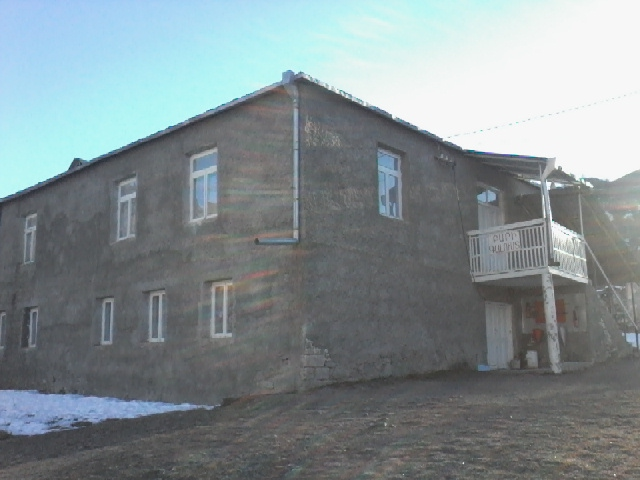

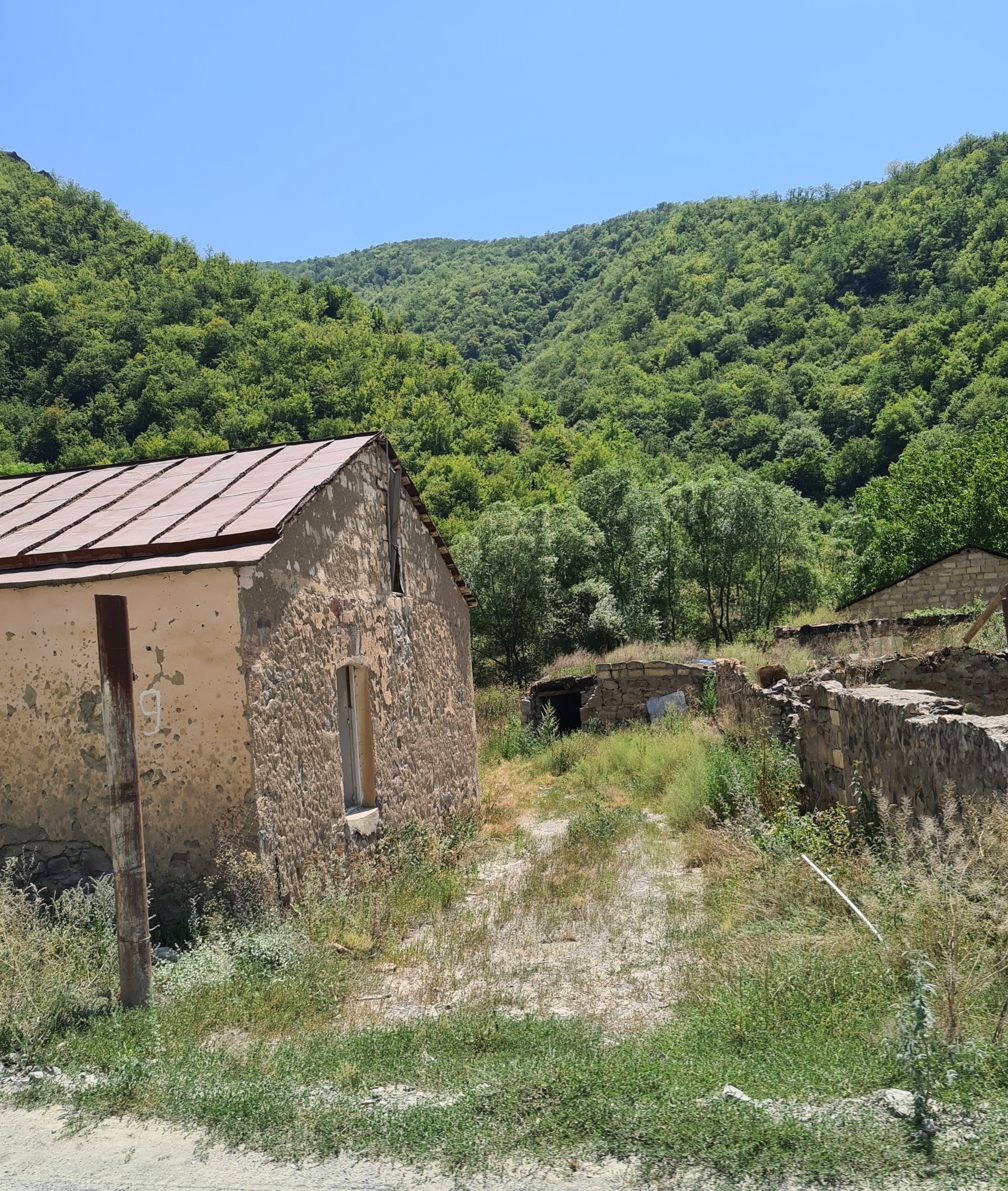

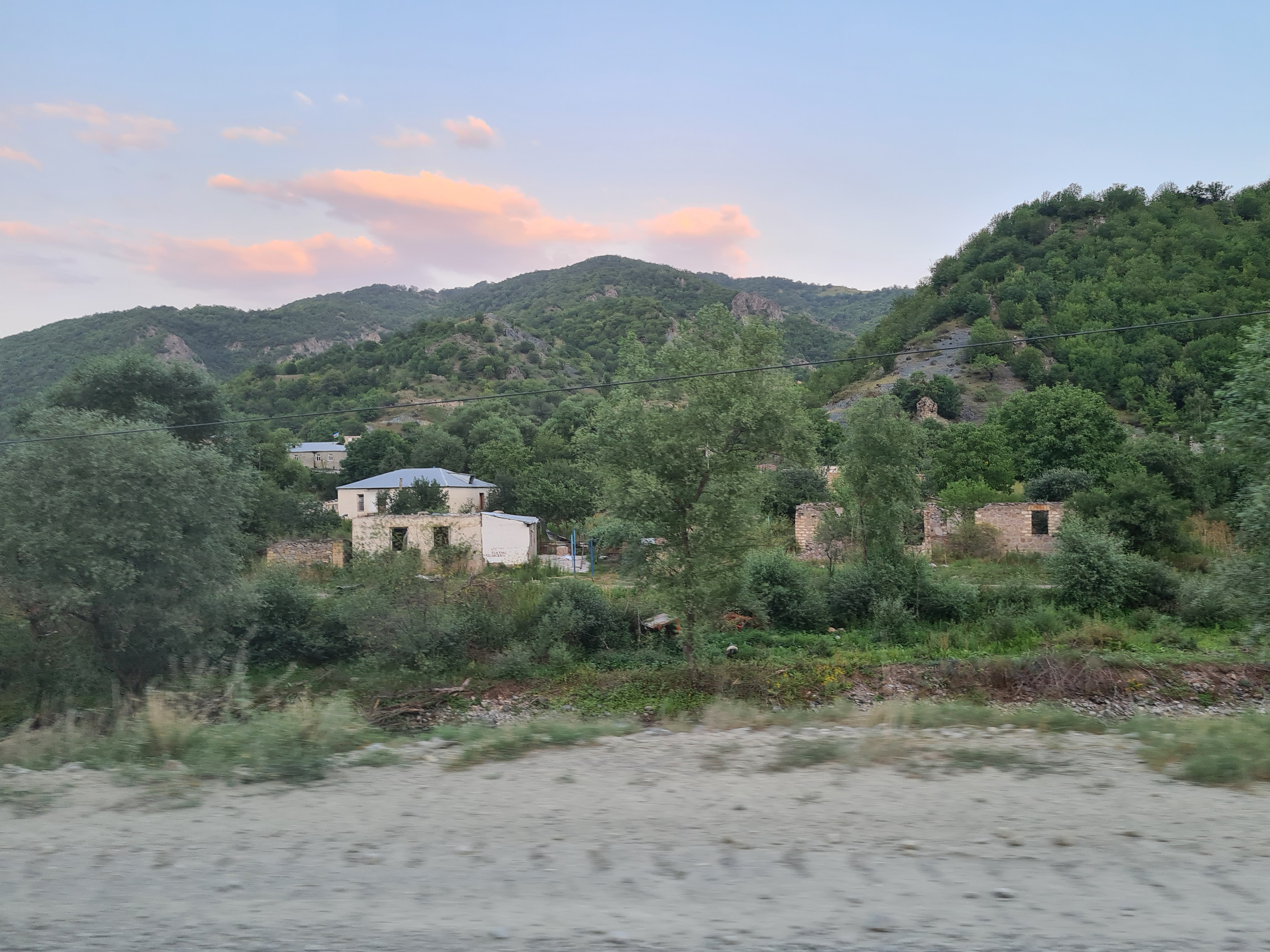
