= Alçalı, Kalbajar =

Alçalı
- Location within Azerbaijan Location within East Zangezur Economic Region
- Coordinates: 40°10′52.3″N 46°06′57.9″E
- Country: Azerbaijan
- District: Kalbajar
- Time zone: UTC+4 (AZT)
  - Summer (DST): UTC+5 (AZT)

Alçalı (Alchaly) is a village in the Kalbajar District of Azerbaijan.
