= Aşağı Qaraçanlı =

Ashaghy Garachanly
- Azerbaijani: Aşağı Qaraçanlı
- Location within Azerbaijan Location within East Zangezur Economic Region
- Coordinates: 40°02′11″N 46°03′21″E
- Country: Azerbaijan
- District: Kalbajar
- Time zone: UTC+4 (AZT)
  - Summer (DST): UTC+5 (AZT)

Aşağı Qaraçanlı (also, Ashaghy Garachanly) is a village in the Kalbajar District of Azerbaijan.
