= Al-Shorta (disambiguation) =

Al-Shorta or Shorta may refer to:

== Football clubs ==
- Al-Shorta SC, in Baghdad, Iraq
- Al-Shorta SC (Syria), in Damascus, Syria
- Shorta Aleppo SC, in Aleppo, Syria
- Al-Shorta Doha, former name of Al-Duhail SC in Qatar
- Ittihad El Shorta SC, in Cairo, Egypt
- Aliyat Al-Shorta SC, in Baghdad, Iraq

== Basketball clubs ==
- Al-Shorta SC (basketball), in Baghdad, Iraq

== Other uses ==
- Shurta, Arabic term for police
- Shorta (film), a 2020 Danish film known as Enforcement in English
- Al-Shorta Stadium, a multi-use stadium in Baghdad, Iraq
- Al-Shorta Stadium (1990), a former multi-use stadium in Baghdad, Iraq
