= Quzeyçirkin =

- Location within Azerbaijan Location within East Zangezur Economic Region
- Coordinates: 40°08′39″N 46°10′19″E
- Country: Azerbaijan
- Rayon: Kalbajar
- Elevation: 1,648 m (5,407 ft)
- Time zone: UTC+4 (AZT)
  - Summer (DST): UTC+5 (AZT)

Quzeyçirkin (Guzeychirkin) is a village in the Kalbajar District of Azerbaijan.
