= Bashkend, Kalbajar =

Bashkend Başkənd
- Location within Azerbaijan Location within East Zangezur Economic Region
- Coordinates: 40°07′58″N 46°07′23″E
- Country: Azerbaijan
- Rayon: Kalbajar
- Time zone: UTC+4 (AZT)
  - Summer (DST): UTC+5 (AZT)

Bashkend (Azerbaijani: Başkənd) is a village in the Kalbajar Rayon of Azerbaijan.
