= Daşbulaq, Kalbajar =

Daşbulaq
- Location within Azerbaijan Location within East Zangezur Economic Region
- Coordinates: 40°08′19.5″N 46°01′38.9″E
- Country: Azerbaijan
- District: Kalbajar
- Time zone: UTC+4 (AZT)
  - Summer (DST): UTC+4 (AZT)

Daşbulaq (Dashbulag) is a ghost village in the Kalbajar District of Azerbaijan.

== Etymology ==
Originally known as Kilsali (Azerbaijani: Kilsəli, literally, "with church") due to the proximity of ancient churches, the village was renamed Daşbulaq (literally, stone spring) commemorating two ancient stone baths which remain the village's most notable feature. In 1956, the village was given the suitably communist name Oktyabrkend in honour of the October Revolution but in 1992 - following Azerbaijan's independence, the former name of the village, Dashbulag, was restored.

== History ==
In 1993, the village along with the Kalbajar District was occupied by Armenian forces and incorporated into the self-proclaimed Republic of Artsakh as part of its Shahumyan Province. The village was returned to Azerbaijan on 25 November 2020 as part of the 2020 Nagorno-Karabakh ceasefire agreement which ended the 2020 Nagorno-Karabakh war. Subsequently, Azerbaijani Ministry of Defence published a video of the village in January 2021, showing the ruined state of the village, following its occupation.

== Stone baths ==
Dashbulag takes its name from a spring that flows into a pair of ancient hand-carved stone troughs or baths, each around 2 metres long, 1 metre wide and 60 centimetres high. The surfaces of each trough are inscribed in an ancient language said by some sources to be in the script of Caucasian Albanian. The spring water, which is considered to have medicinal properties, flows from the spring first filling one bath then overflowing into the second through a special opening.
