= Mozqaraçanlı =

Mozgarachanly
- Azerbaijani: Mozqaraçanlı
- Location within Azerbaijan Location within East Zangezur Economic Region
- Coordinates: 40°04′07.0″N 46°11′09.5″E
- Country: Azerbaijan
- District: Kalbajar
- Time zone: UTC+4 (AZT)
  - Summer (DST): UTC+5 (AZT)

Mozqaraçanlı (Mozgarachanly) is a village in the Kalbajar District of Azerbaijan.
