= Tblghu, Nagorno-Karabakh =

Tblghu / Damghaly Թբլղու / Damğalı
- Location within Azerbaijan Location within East Zangezur Economic Region
- Coordinates: 40°01′N 46°37′E
- Country: Azerbaijan
  - District: Aghdara

Population (2015)
  - Total: 158
- Time zone: UTC+4 (AZT)

Tblghu (Armenian: Թբլղու) or Damghaly (Azerbaijani: Damğalı) is a village located in the Aghdara District of Azerbaijan, in the region of Nagorno-Karabakh. Until 2023 it was controlled by the breakaway Republic of Artsakh. The village had an ethnic Armenian-majority population until the expulsion of the Armenian population of Nagorno-Karabakh by Azerbaijan following the 2023 Azerbaijani offensive in Nagorno-Karabakh.

== History ==
During the Soviet period, the village was part of the Mardakert District of the Nagorno-Karabakh Autonomous Oblast.

== Historical heritage sites ==
Historical heritage sites in and around the village include the 12th/13th-century fortress of Aghuyen (Armenian: Աղուեն), a 13th-century church, a 13th-century khachkar, and an 18th/19th-century cemetery.

== Economy and culture ==
The population is mainly engaged in agriculture and animal husbandry. As of 2015, the village has a municipal building, a house of culture, the Tblghu branch of the Kolatak Secondary School, and a medical centre.

== Demographics ==
The village had 176 inhabitants in 2005, and 158 inhabitants in 2015.
