= Dərəqışlaq =

- Location within Azerbaijan Location within East Zangezur Economic Region
- Coordinates: 40°07′N 46°03′E
- Country: Azerbaijan
- Rayon: Kalbajar
- Time zone: UTC+4 (AZT)
  - Summer (DST): UTC+5 (AZT)

Dərəqışlaq is a village in the Kalbajar Rayon of [lAzerbaijan.
