= Mişni, Kalbajar =

Mişni
- Location within Azerbaijan Location within East Zangezur Economic Region
- Coordinates: 40°09′38.4″N 46°02′48.8″E
- Country: Azerbaijan
- District: Kalbajar
- Time zone: UTC+4 (AZT)
  - Summer (DST): UTC+5 (AZT)

Mişni (Mishni) is a village in the Kalbajar District of Azerbaijan.
