= Aşağı Şurtan =

- Location within Azerbaijan Location within East Zangezur Economic Region
- Coordinates: 39°59′31″N 46°00′08″E
- Country: Azerbaijan
- District: Kalbajar
- Time zone: UTC+4 (AZT)
  - Summer (DST): UTC+5 (AZT)

Aşağı Şurtan (Ashaghy Shurtan) is a village in the Kalbajar District of Azerbaijan.

The settlement is so named because it is located on the lower reaches of the Shurtanchay River in the area.
