= Almalıq =

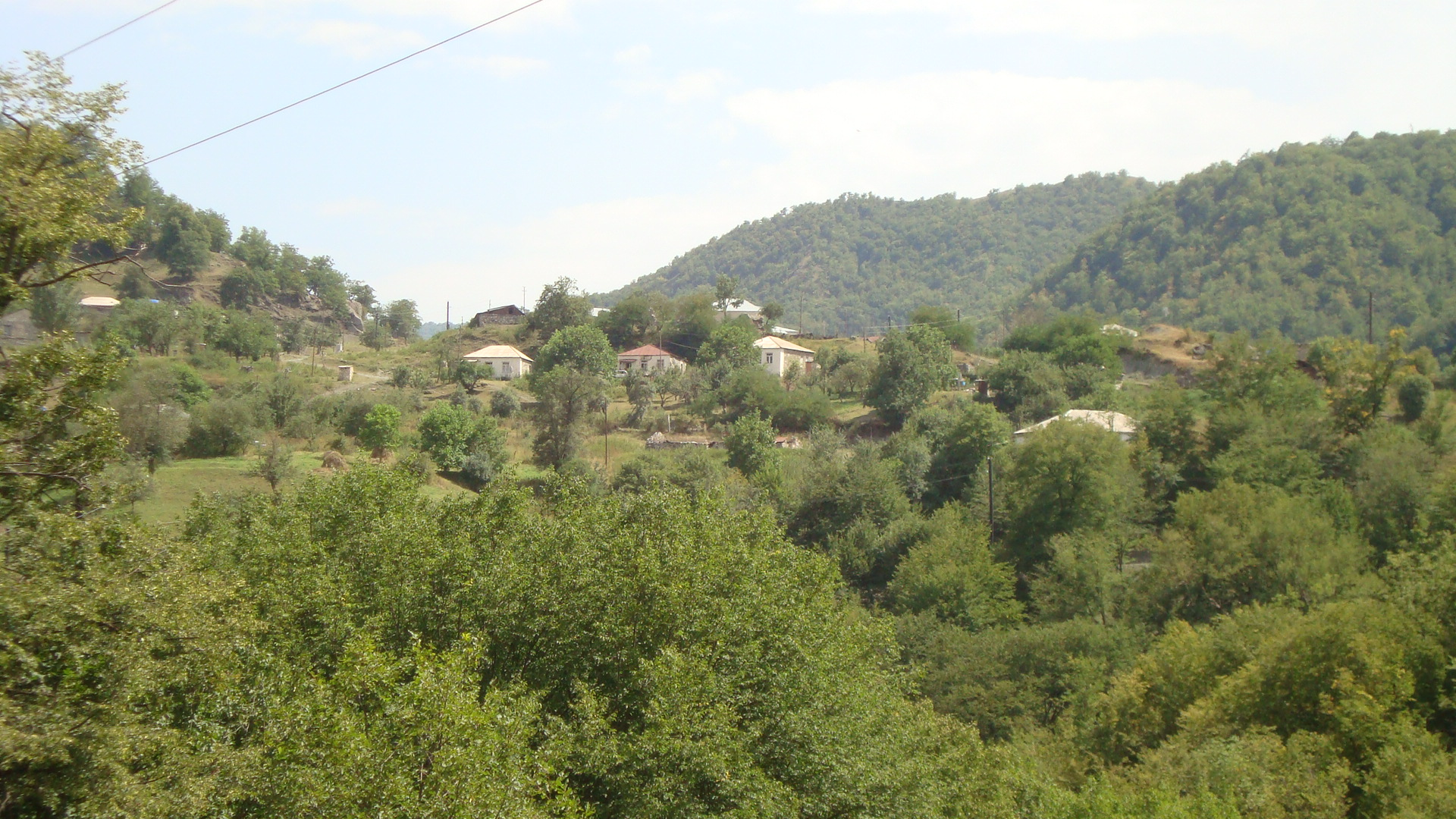

- Location within Azerbaijan Location within East Zangezur Economic Region
- Coordinates: 40°06′01.1″N 46°14′15.1″E
- Country: Azerbaijan
- District: Kalbajar
- Elevation: 1,498 m (4,915 ft)

Population (2015)
  - Total: 111
- Time zone: UTC+4 (AZT)

Almalıq (Almalyg) is a village in the Kalbajar District of Azerbaijan.

== History ==
The village was located in the Armenian-occupied territories surrounding Nagorno-Karabakh, coming under the control of ethnic Armenian forces during the First Nagorno-Karabakh War in the early 1990s. The village subsequently became part of the breakaway Republic of Artsakh as part of its Shahumyan Province, referred to as Havsatagh (Armenian: Հավսաթաղ). It was returned to Azerbaijan as part of the 2020 Nagorno-Karabakh ceasefire agreement at the end of the Second Nagorno-Karabakh war.

== Demographics ==
The village had 65 inhabitants in 2005, and 111 inhabitants in 2015.

== Gallery ==
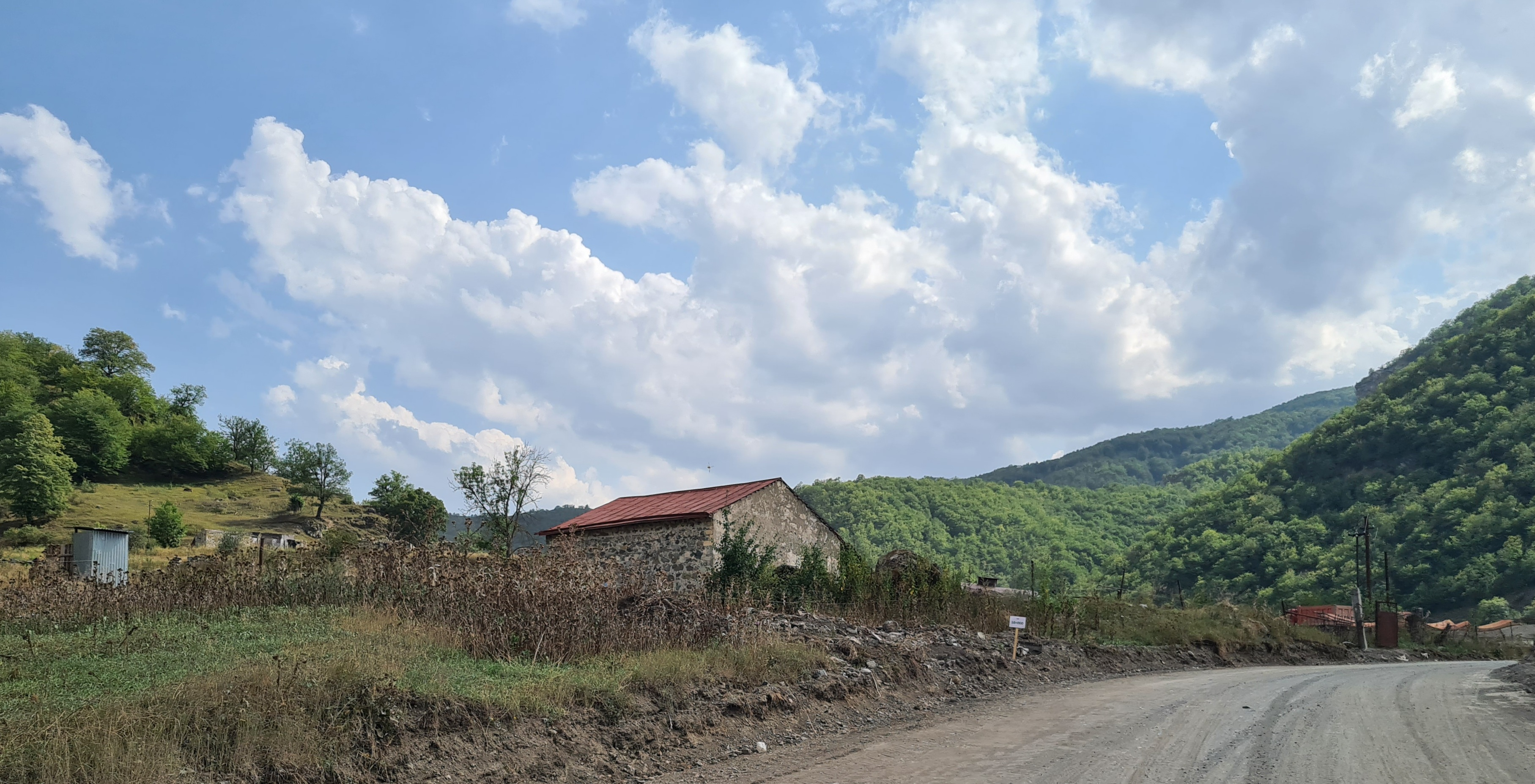

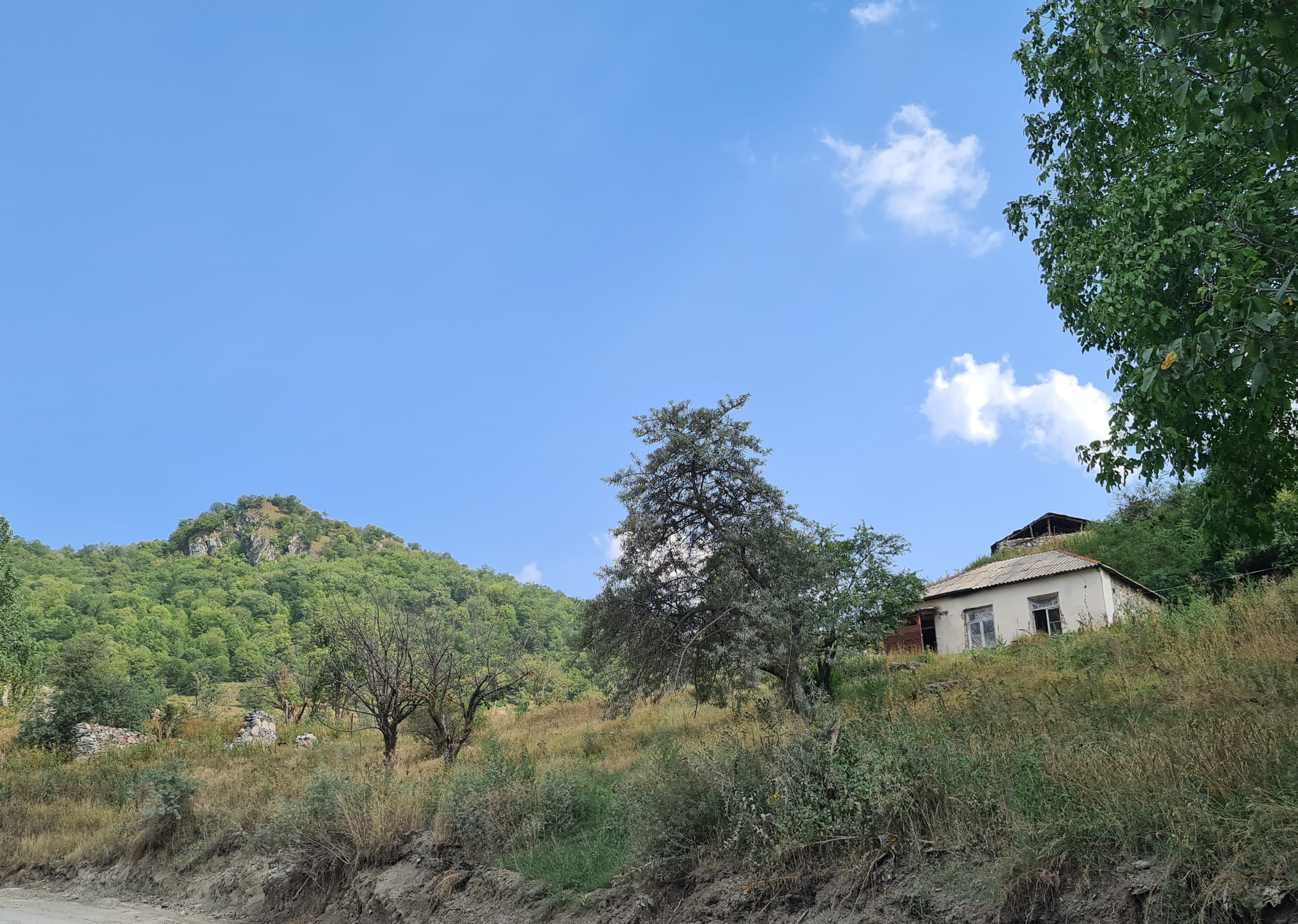

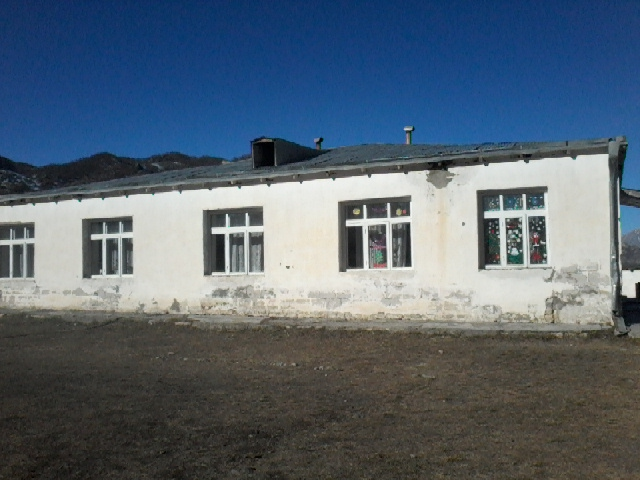
