= Kalbajar District =

District in western Azerbaijan

Coordinates: 40.1067°N 46.0383°E

- District
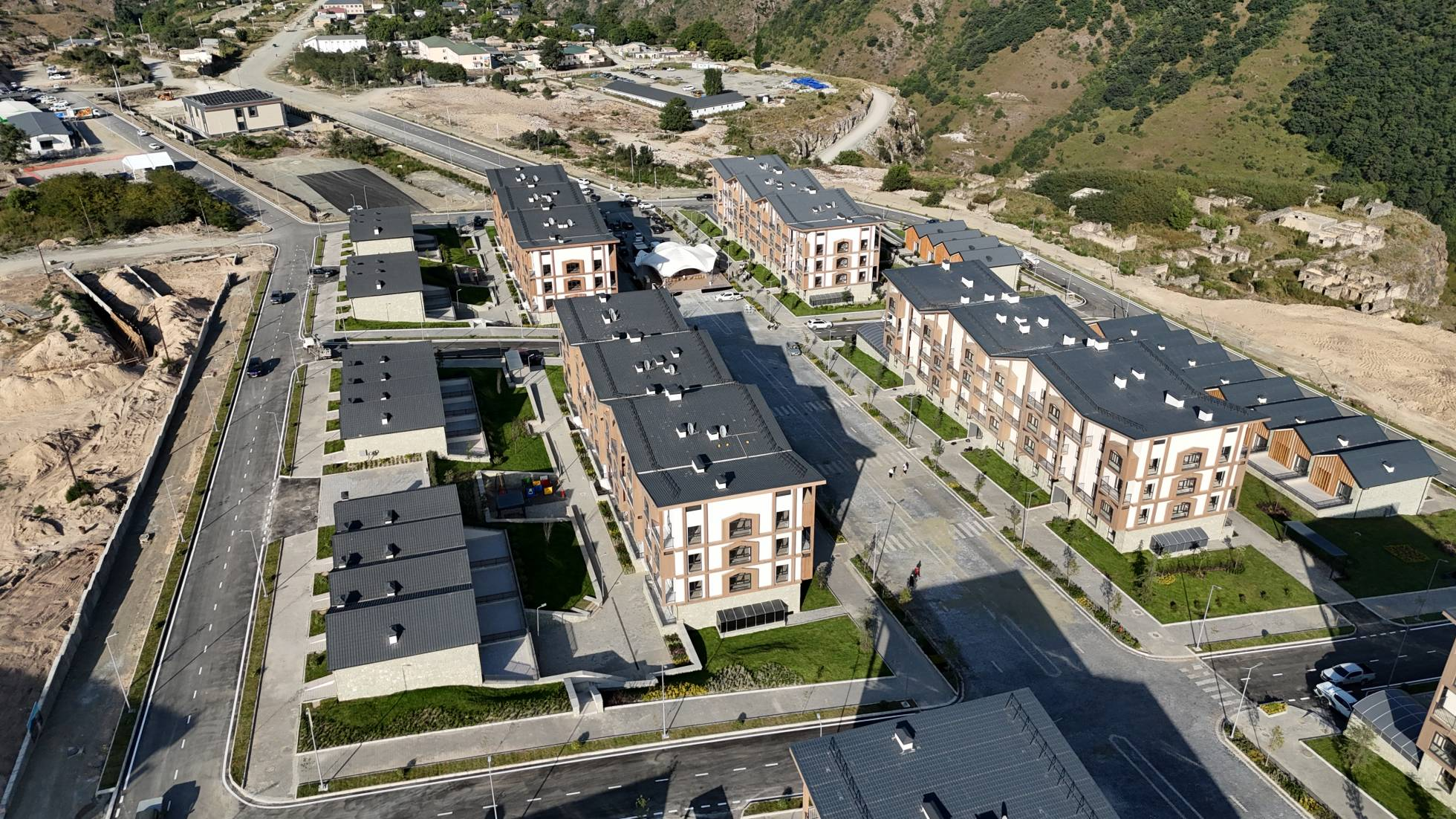
- The city of Kalbajar, August 2025

- Map of Azerbaijan showing Kalbajar District
- Country: Azerbaijan
- Region: East Zangezur
- Established: 8 August 1930
- Capital: Kalbajar
- Settlements: 147

Government
  - Governor: Azer Gojayev

Area
  - Total: 3,050 km^{2} (1,180 sq mi)

Population (2020)
  - Total: 94,100
  - Density: 30.9/km^{2} (79.9/sq mi)
- Time zone: UTC+4 (AZT)
- Postal code: 3200
- Website: kelbecer-ih.gov.az

Kalbajar District (Azerbaijani: Kəlbəcər rayonu) is one of the 67 districts of Azerbaijan. It is located in the west of the country and belongs to the East Zangezur Economic Region. The district borders the districts of Lachin, Khojaly, Agdam, Tartar, Goranboy, Goygol and Dashkasan districts of Azerbaijan, as well as the Gegharkunik and Vayots Dzor provinces of Armenia. Its capital and largest city is Kalbajar. As of 2020, the district had a nominal population of 94,100.

== History ==
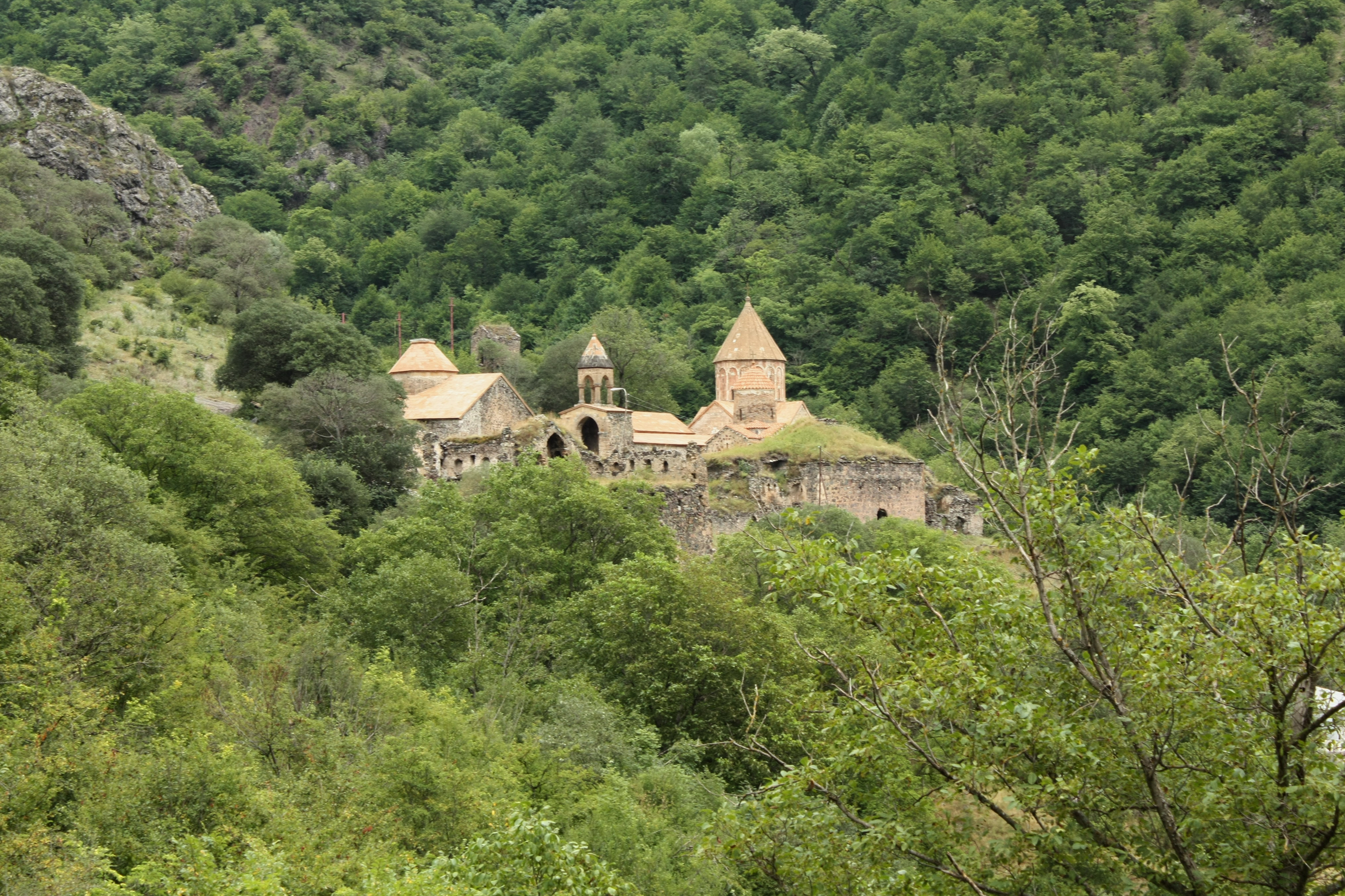
Dadivank monastery

In Turkic Kalbajar means "Castle on the mouth of the river". The city of Kalbajar was renamed to Karvachar (Armenian: Քարվաճառ) after its occupation in the First Nagorno-Karabakh war, which corresponds to the ancient district of Vaykunik, one of 12 cantons of Artsakh. Kalbacar was registered as "Kəlavəçər" or "Kellaveçer", was one of villages of Zar nahiye of Nakhchivan kaza in Nakhchivan sanjak of Revan Eyalet in 1590 during first Ottoman rule. It was also known as Upper-Khachen or Tsar (after its chief town) and was ruled by one of the branches of the House of Khachen, who held it until the Russian conquest of the Karabakh region in the early 19th century. In 1992, Azerbaijan abolished the Mardakert District of the Nagorno-Karabakh Autonomous Oblast, and its western part was included in the Kalbajar district.

=== Armenian occupation ===
As a result of the First Nagorno-Karabakh War, the area was occupied by Armenian forces on April 3, 1993. The district was declared a part of the self-proclaimed Republic of Artsakh, although it continued to be recognized by the United Nations as a territory of the Republic of Azerbaijan. The Azerbaijani population of Kalbajar were displaced and lived as internally displaced persons in other regions of Azerbaijan. The district was made into the Shahumyan Province, one of the eight regions of NKR. The region remained the least populated of the NKR regions with a total population of 2,800. The town of Kalbajar was home to 500 Armenian residents.

=== Return to Azerbaijan ===
Under the terms of the agreement that ended the 2020 Nagorno-Karabakh War, most of the district (i.e. Kelbajar district within its Soviet time borders) returned to Azerbaijani control. The eastern part of the district, which was part of Martakert Province, remained under the control of the Republic of Artsakh. Initially, the western part was to be returned to Azerbaijani control by 15 November 2020, but this deadline was subsequently extended to 25 November 2020. In the early hours of November 25, Azerbaijani forces entered the region; it was the second region to be returned to Azerbaijan per the ceasefire agreement.

== Cultural monuments ==
The district has close to 750 Armenian cultural monuments, which include monasteries, churches, chapels, fortresses, khachkars and inscriptions. The most well-known are the monasteries of Dadivank and Gandzasar.

== Economy ==
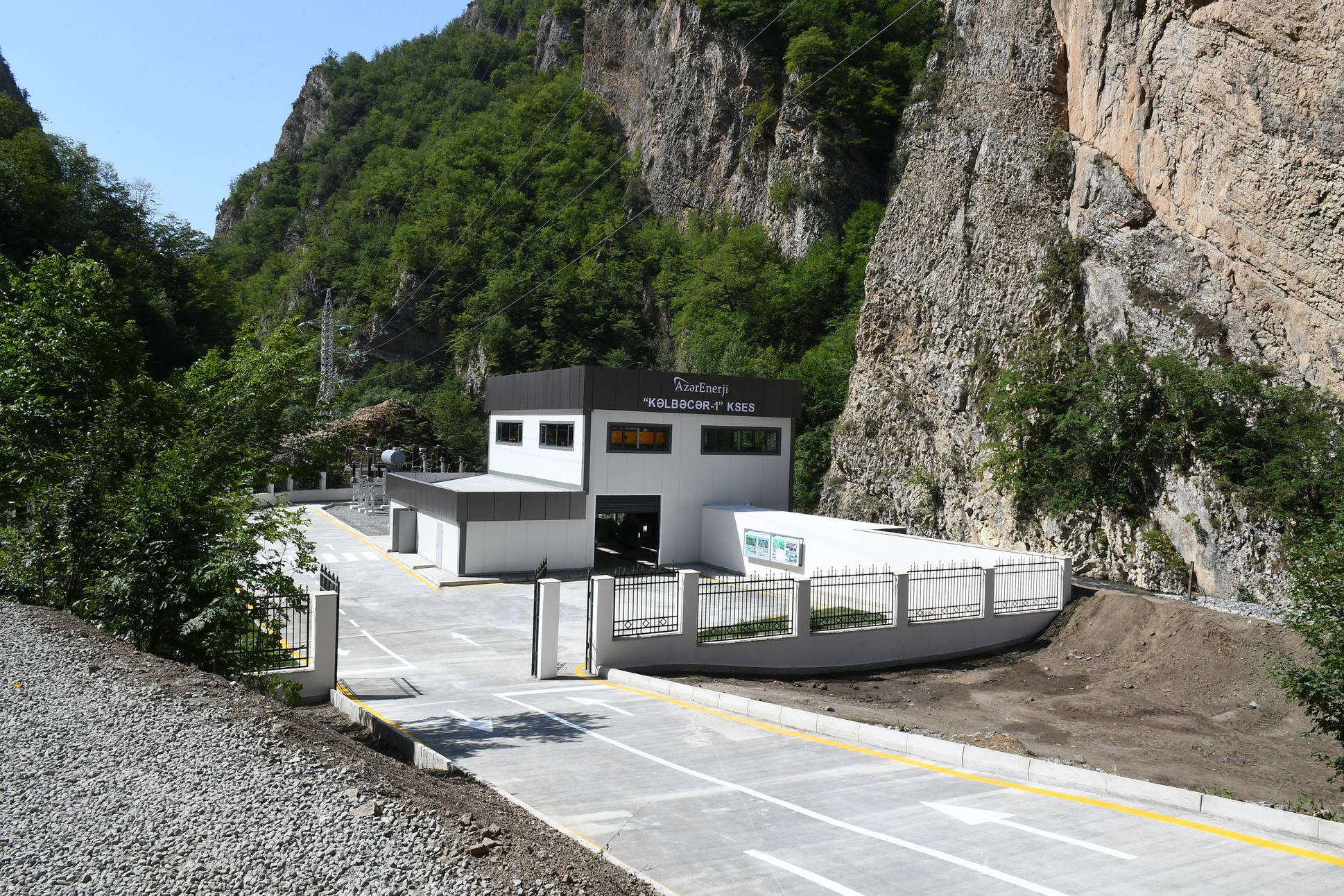
"Kalbajar-1" hydropower station

In 2022, the small 4.4 MW hydroelectric power plant Kelbajar-1 started operationing.

== Demographics ==
At the beginning of the 17th century, most of the Armenians of the region, roughly corresponding to the territory of the region, were deported to Iran, and Kurds began to settle in the region.

According to the "Statistical Data on the Population of the Transcaucasian Territory, extracted from the family lists of 1886", on the territory of the Avrayan, Ayrum, Asrik, Koturli, Farakhkanli and Chirakhli rural communities of the Jevanshir uezd of the Elizavetpol Governorate, corresponding to the territory of the Kelbajar region (within its Soviet borders), overall, there were 6446 Kurds and 919 Tatars (later known as Azerbaijanis), all of the Shiite religion.

According to the 1926 census, Kurds made up 99.8%, and Turks (later known as Azerbaijanis) - only 0.5% of the population of the Kelbajar district of the Kurdistan uezd, while for the majority of the population the native language was Turkic (later known as Azerbaijani).

In 1933, Turks (i.e. Azerbaijanis) accounted for 100% of the total population of the Bashlybel, Asrik, Kilsala, Otaklar, Kamyshli, Kylychli village councils, more than 99% of the Seidlar, Synykh-Kilisalinsky, Zarsky, Zulfugarli village councils, as well as more than 90% of the Kelbajar and Keshtak village councils. Also, Azerbaijanis made up 50.6% of the Chirakh village council, while 44.4% were Kurds. Only in the Aghjakent village council, Kurds made up the majority - 90.9%.

According to the 1939 census, 89.5% of the region's population were Azerbaijanis.

As of 1979, the region had a population of 40,516:

- Azerbaijanis 99.5% (40,329)
- Armenians 0.1% (49)
- Lezgins 0.1% (30)
- Russians 0.1% (46)

In 1980, the population excluding Nagorno Karabakh was 40,300, counting 124 settlements. 8 of these settlements were Kurdish.

The population grew to 43,713 by 1989.

As of 1999, the population in the Kalbajar District including part of the now-abolished Mardakert District was 66,211, however the census counts were not carried out in Armenian-occupied parts of Kalbajar:

- Azerbaijanis 83.2% (55,082)
- Armenians 14.8% (9,794)
- Lezgins 0,1% (9)
- Kurds 1.9% (1,248)
- Russians 0.1% (23)
- Other 0.1% (45)

=== During Armenian occupation ===
Starting in the early 2000s, the district was slowly repopulated by Armenian settlers from eastern Shahumyan and Gulustan area.

According to the 2005 census carried out by the self-proclaimed Republic of Artsakh, 2,560 Armenians were living in the western part of the Shahumyan Province, which roughly corresponded to the Soviet Kalbajar District. The number grew to 2,800 by 2006.

By 2015, the number of Armenians who had settled in the district had grown to 3,090 according to the statistics provided by Artsakh.

However, the international observers provided different figures. An OSCE Fact-Finding Mission visited the occupied territories of Azerbaijan in 2005 to inspect settlement activity in the area and report its findings to the Co-Chairs of the OSCE Minsk Group. According to FFM figures, at that time the number of Armenian settlers in Kalbajar District was approximately 1,500. The OSCE Minsk Group Co-Chairs, who conducted a Field Assessment Mission to the occupied territories of Azerbaijan in October 2010 reported that there had been no significant growth in the population since 2005.

== Villages ==
- Abdullauşağı
- Ağbulaq
- Ağcakənd
- Ağdaban
- Ağdaş
- Ağqaya
- Ağyataq
- Alçalı
- Alıbəyli
- Alırzalar
- Allıkənd
- Almalıq
- Alolar
- Alukend
- Armudlu
- Aşağı Ayrım
- Aşağı Şurtan
- Aşağı Qaraçanlı
- Babaşlar
- Bağırlı
- Bağırsaq
- Bağlıpəyə
- Barmaqbinə
- Başkənd
- Başlıbel
- Baş Qaraçanlı
- Bazarkənd
- Bəzirxana
- Birinci Milli
- Boyaqlı
- Bozlu
- Böyükdüz
- Böyürbinə
- Cəmilli
- Comərd
- Çaykənd
- Çayqovuşan
- Çəpli
- Çərəktar
- Çıldıran
- Çıraq
- Çobankərəhməz
- Çopurlu
- Çorman
- Çormanlı
- Çovdar
- Dalqılınclı
- Damğalı
- Daşbulaq
- Dəmirçidam
- Dərəqışlaq
- Dəvədaşı
- Dovşanlı
- Əsrik
- Fərxani
- Fətallar
- Göydərə
- Gözlübulaq
- Güneypəyə
- Günəşli
- Günəşqaya
- Hacıdünyamalılar
- Hacıkənd
- Hayad
- Heyvalı
- Həsənlər
- Həsənriz
- Hopurlu
- İkinci Milli
- İlyaslar
- İmanbinəsi
- İstibulaq
- İstisu
- Kaha
- Keçiliqaya
- Keşdək
- Kəndyeri
- Kərəmli
- Kolatağ
- Laçın
- Lev
- Mehmana
- Məmmədsəfi
- Məmməduşağı
- Mərcimək
- Mişni
- Mollabayramlı
- Moz
- Mozqaraçanlı
- Nadirxanlı
- Narınclar
- Nəbilər
- Nəcafalı
- Orta Qaraçanlı
- Orta Şurtan
- Oruclu
- Otaqlı
- Otqışlaq
- Pirilər
- Qalaboyun
- Qamışlı
- Qanlıkənd
- Qaragüney
- Qaraxançallı
- Qasımbinəsi
- Qasımlar
- Qazıxanlı
- Qılınclı
- Qızılqaya
- Qozlu
- Qozlukörpü
- Quzeyçirkin
- Rəhimli
- Sarıdaş
- Seyidlər
- Soyuqbulaq
- Susuzluq
- Şahkərəm
- Şahmansurlu
- Şaplar
- Şeyinli
- Tağılar
- Tatlar
- Taxtabaşı
- Təkdam
- Təkəqaya
- Təzəkənd
- Tirkeşəvənd
- Tövlədərə
- Üçüncü Milli
- Vəng
- Vəngli
- Xallanlı
- Xanməmməd-Bünaən
- Xoləzəy
- Yanşaq
- Yanşaqbinə
- Yayıcı
- Yellicə
- Yenikənd
- Yuxarı Ayrım
- Yuxarı Oratağ
- Yuxarı Şurtan
- Zağalar
- Zallar
- Zar
- Zərqulu
- Zəylik
- Zivel
- Zülfüqarlı

== Transportation ==
Toghanali–Kalbajar–Istisu highway

== See also ==
- Armenian-occupied territories surrounding Nagorno-Karabakh
- Battle of Kalbajar
- List of power stations in Azerbaijan
- Murovdagh Tunnel
