= Capture of Garadaghly =

1992 event of the first Nagorno-Karabakh War

Coordinates: 39°47′49″N 46°58′32″E

- Part of the First Nagorno-Karabakh War
Date	17 February 1992
Location	Garadaghly, Nagorno-Karabakh
Result	Armenian victory

Belligerents
Artsakh; Armenia	(Azerbaijan Democratic Republic) Azerbaijan

Units involved
(Republic of Artsakh) Arabo Battalion	(Azerbaijan Democratic Republic) Unknown

Casualties and losses
Unknown	20 were killed 15 were wounded

The Capture of Garadaghly (Azerbaijani: Qaradağlının işğalı) was the seizure of Garadaghly, an Azerbaijani-populated village in Khojavend district of Nagorno-Karabakh by Armenian volunteer units on 17 February 1992, in the First Nagorno-Karabakh War.

== Preceding events ==
In the spring and summer of 1991, the violence during the First Nagorno-Karabakh war escalated into a partisan-style conflict between villages as raids were made and hostages were taken. In one of these events, six Azerbaijani villagers were killed in one attack by Armenian fighters in Garadaghly.

== Attack ==
The assault began at 5am on 17 February 1992. The battle continued for 11 hours and resulted in the capture of Garadaghly by Armenian troops. Arabo and Aramo units, and Monte Melkonian's units took part in the operation. Survivors fled to Aghdam over the mountains. The attack on the village resulted in the deaths of more than 20 people and the injuries of 15 others.

Markar Melkonian, brother of Monte Melkonian, who participated in the capture of the village, describes in his book My Brother's Road that the fighters from Arabo and Aramo units gathered thirty-eight Azerbaijani captives, including several women and other non-combatants, in a ditch on the outskirts of the village. One of the captives in the ditch tossed a grenade, injuring one of the captors. The Arabo and Aramo fighters who were already "wishing to avenge the death of another comrade the day before, began stabbing and shooting their captives", until all died. One of the Armenian fighters doused several wounded Azerbaijani soldiers with gasoline and burned them alive. Melkonian's brother wrote that Monte was against killings - he commanded that "no captives were to be harmed".

== Aftermath ==
After the capture of Garadaghly, the Azerbaijani defence minister Tajeddin Mehdiyev was fired. Letters had been sent by Azerbaijan to the United Nations, Organization for Security and Co-operation in Europe and Red Cross condemning the killing of Azerbaijani civilians.

== See also ==
- Khojaly massacre
- Maraga massacre
- Capture of Gushchular and Malibeyli
