= Battle of Kalbajar =

Battle during the First Nagorno-Karabakh War

- Part of the First Nagorno-Karabakh War
Date	March 27 – April 3, 1993 (1 week)
Location	Kalbajar District, Azerbaijan
Result	Armenian victory

Belligerents
Armenia; Nagorno-Karabakh Republic	Azerbaijan

Commanders and leaders
(Armenia) Gurgen Dalibaltayan (Republic of Artsakh) Samvel Babayan (Republic of Artsakh) Monte Melkonian	Surat Huseynov; Shamil Asgarov; Najmeddin Sadikov

Strength
Several hundred troops, including the crew members of tanks and armored fighting vehicles;	701st brigade (Unknown number of infantry and tanks)

Casualties and losses
Minimal	400 servicemen killed (per Azerbaijan); 150+ servicemen captured
- ~60,000 Azerbaijanis and Kurds displaced 80 civilians taken hostage Hundreds of civilians died from frostbite

The Battle of Kalbajar (Note: Also referred to as the Occupation of Kalbajar (Azerbaijani: Kəlbəcərin işğalı) or the Liberation of Karvachar (Armenian: Քարվաճառի ազատագրում).) took place in March and April 1993, during the First Nagorno-Karabakh War. It resulted in the capture of the Kalbajar District of Azerbaijan by Armenian military forces.

Kalbajar lies outside the contested enclave of the former Nagorno-Karabakh Autonomous Oblast (NKAO). The offensive was the first time Armenian forces from Nagorno-Karabakh had advanced beyond the boundaries of the enclave (besides the capture of Lachin in 1992). Kalbajar District, located between Armenia and the western border of the former NKAO, was composed of several dozen villages and its provincial capital, also named Kalbajar. The Armenian side launched an attack from four directions, including Armenia proper. After initial heavy resistance, the Azerbaijani defence quickly collapsed and the provincial capital fell on April 3, 1993. Armenian forces captured an area of more than 1,900 square kilometres, establishing a second overland link between Armenia and Nagorno-Karabakh.

As a result of the battle, an estimated 60,000 Kurdish and Azerbaijani civilians were displaced. Civilians fled Kalbajar in April through mountains still covered in snow. Refugees reported that hundreds of people froze to death attempting to flee. Azerbaijan made an unsuccessful attempt to recapture the region in winter 1993–1994.

Kalbajar was under the control of the self-proclaimed Nagorno-Karabakh Republic until November 25, 2020, when Armenian troops returned the region along with other occupied districts surrounding Nagorno-Karabakh to Azerbaijani control under a ceasefire agreement mediated by Russia, ending the Second Nagorno-Karabakh War.

== Background ==
An autonomous oblast during the Soviet era under the jurisdiction of the Azerbaijan SSR, Nagorno-Karabakh's population was approximately 76% ethnic Armenian. As the Soviet Union's disintegration approached during the late 1980s, the enclave's government expressed its desire to secede and unite with the neighbouring Armenian SSR. By 1991, Armenia and Azerbaijan were independent countries but the nascent Nagorno-Karabakh Republic (NKR) remained internationally unrecognized despite its government's declaration of independence. Small-scale violence had flared up between the two ethnic groups in February 1988 but soon escalated to use of Soviet-built tanks, helicopters, and fighter bombers appropriated by both sides after the collapse of the Soviet Union.

On May 9, 1992, Armenian forces captured the mountain stronghold of Shusha and soon after established a land connection between Nagorno-Karabakh and Armenia through Lachin. However, the Armenian side was caught unprepared by an Azerbaijani offensive in the summer of 1992, when Azerbaijani forces captured practically the entire northern part of Nagorno-Karabakh (the former Martakert District), at one point occupying nearly half of the territory of the former NKAO. Armenian forces managed to halt the Azerbaijani advance by October 1992 and began to retake territory in the north by February 1993. Meanwhile, internal divisions plagued the Azerbaijani war effort, with Colonel Surat Huseynov moving his units away from the frontline to Ganja after being dismissed from his posts, leaving Kalbajar particularly vulnerable.

== The region of Kalbajar ==
Kalbajar is a raion surrounded by several canyons and an elevated mountain range known as the Murov Mountains. It is located between Armenia and the western boundary of the former Nagorno-Karabakh Autonomous Oblast, and is of significant strategic importance to both sides. Its wartime population of approximately 60,000 was primarily made up of ethnic Azerbaijanis and Kurds. In February-March 1993, Kalbajar was virtually surrounded, wedged between Armenia, Armenian-controlled Lachin District, and the Murov Mountains, the main mountain pass of which (the Omar Pass) is nearly impassable in the winter and early spring. Its main connection to the rest of Azerbaijan, the road to Tartar, passed through Armenian-controlled territory in Martakert Province.

=== Rationale for its taking ===
In March 1993, military incursions by Azerbaijani forces and artillery barrages were reported to have been coming from the region, prompting military leaders to announce an offensive against the district. In an interview given in April 1993, General Gurgen Dalibaltyan, who planned the operation, explained that its strategic purpose was to "create a reliable connection between Karabakh and Armenia, since Lachin was in a difficult position, surrounded by enemy forces", while also referring to Kalbajar as "our historical homeland". Speaking in 2020, Serzh Sargsyan, who was a member of the State Defence Committee of the NKR at the time of the battle, stated that the operation to capture Kalbajar was conceived in January 1993 and was aimed at securing the rear of Nagorno-Karabakh and especially Martakert Province, which in Sargsyan's words "was impossible to defend from multiple sides".

One of the most successful Armenian commanders of the conflict and participant in the Battle of Kalbajar, Monte Melkonian, stated that Armenian forces had to take the district in order to suppress Azerbaijani artillery strikes against nearby Armenian villages. However, Melkonian also justified the operation on historical grounds, citing historical Armenian presence in the area. He stated, "This is a historical issue... of course this is historical Armenia... And we'll vindicate that reality [to the Azerbaijanis] with our guns. Unfortunately! It would be nice if the Azerbaijanis would understand that reality is reality, agree and say OK, it's yours, and that's that". Questioned on the possibility of a large expulsion of civilians if the region was captured, Melkonian responded, "A lot of blood has been spilled on both sides... The emotions are high and that isn't conducive to living together in near or medium future".

== The battle ==
=== Heavy resistance ===
Defeats in late March already had the Azerbaijani military evacuating civilians out of the region to the northern town of Yevlakh and Azerbaijan's second-largest city, Ganja. The Armenians had assembled a force of several hundred men to enter Kalbajar from four different directions: Melkonian's detachment of tanks and troops from Karabakh would attack from the southeast, one fifty-man unit from the town of Vardenis, Armenia would enter from the west; the third force would attack from the village of Aghdaban in the north, and the primary attacking force would come from the village of Nareshtar. Kalbajar was protected only by a small group of defenders that received no reinforcements; a unit of 200 men attempting to reinforce the district was intercepted and defeated by Samvel Karapetyan's unit. A few days before the commencement of the operation, Armenian forces warned the Azerbaijanis in the district of the coming attack.

The battered village of Charektar in Kalbajar had already seen extensive fighting in earlier weeks and was reinforced by both Azerbaijani and foreign Chechen, Afghan and other fighters as the Armenian offensive commenced on March 27. However, instead of launching a simultaneous attack, only the units in Aghdaban and Nareshtar moved out. Melkonian's armoured column did not move out until later on and his units faced tenacious resistance on an embankment of entrenched defences where his forces were forced to retreat. The troops in Vardenis began their assault shortly thereafter but their advance was slowed since they had to trek through the snowy passes of the Murov Mountains.

On March 28, Melkonian's forces resumed their attack on Charektar and an eight-hour battle ensued until his forces were able to break through the defences. They advanced twenty-nine kilometres, reaching the Tartar River on March 31. The stretched out Azerbaijani forces deployed throughout the region were unable to stop their advance. Within another twenty kilometres of his forces' positions was the Kalbajar District's namesake capital, a crucial road intersection that led to Lachin and the village of Zulfugarli. By March 29, Armenian forces encircled the town of Kalbajar. A journalist reported seeing intensive bombardment of Kalbajar, including Grad artillery, originating from Armenia proper.

=== Melkonian's advance ===
The following two days saw a massive refugee column of cars and trucks "laden with bundles... bumper to bumper" trudging through the intersection. Melkonian ordered his forces to halt their advance until the remnants of the column dried up in the early afternoon of April 1. Assessing that most refugees had left, he ordered his units to advance and sent a detachment to guard a vital tunnel leading south towards Zulfugarli. While his troops had assumed that most civilians had left Kalbajar, they encountered a GAZ-52 transport truck in the tunnel and, thinking it was a military vehicle, fired and destroyed it with rocket-propelled grenades and assault rifles. As they observed the wreck of the vehicle, the troops realized they had taken out a vehicle filled entirely with civilians: twenty-five Kurd and Azerbaijani kolkhoz workers. Four of them, including the driver of the truck and his daughter, were killed. The rest were ordered by Melkonian to be taken to a hospital in Karabakh's capital of Stepanakert; however, as many as eleven of them died.

After the Zulufgarli incident, his forces pushed forward and reached another vital intersection leading to Ganja, fifteen kilometres away from the capital. Civilians in Kalbajar continued to be evacuated by both air and the through the intersection and Melkonian halted his advance by a further forty hours to allow the traffic column to move through. On April 1, his forces issued a radio message to the governor of the region, instructing his forces to leave the capital. An ultimatum was placed until 2 pm of the following day. Identified by his radio codename, "Khan", the governor responded and stated, "We're never going to leave... we'll fight to the end."

=== Final push ===
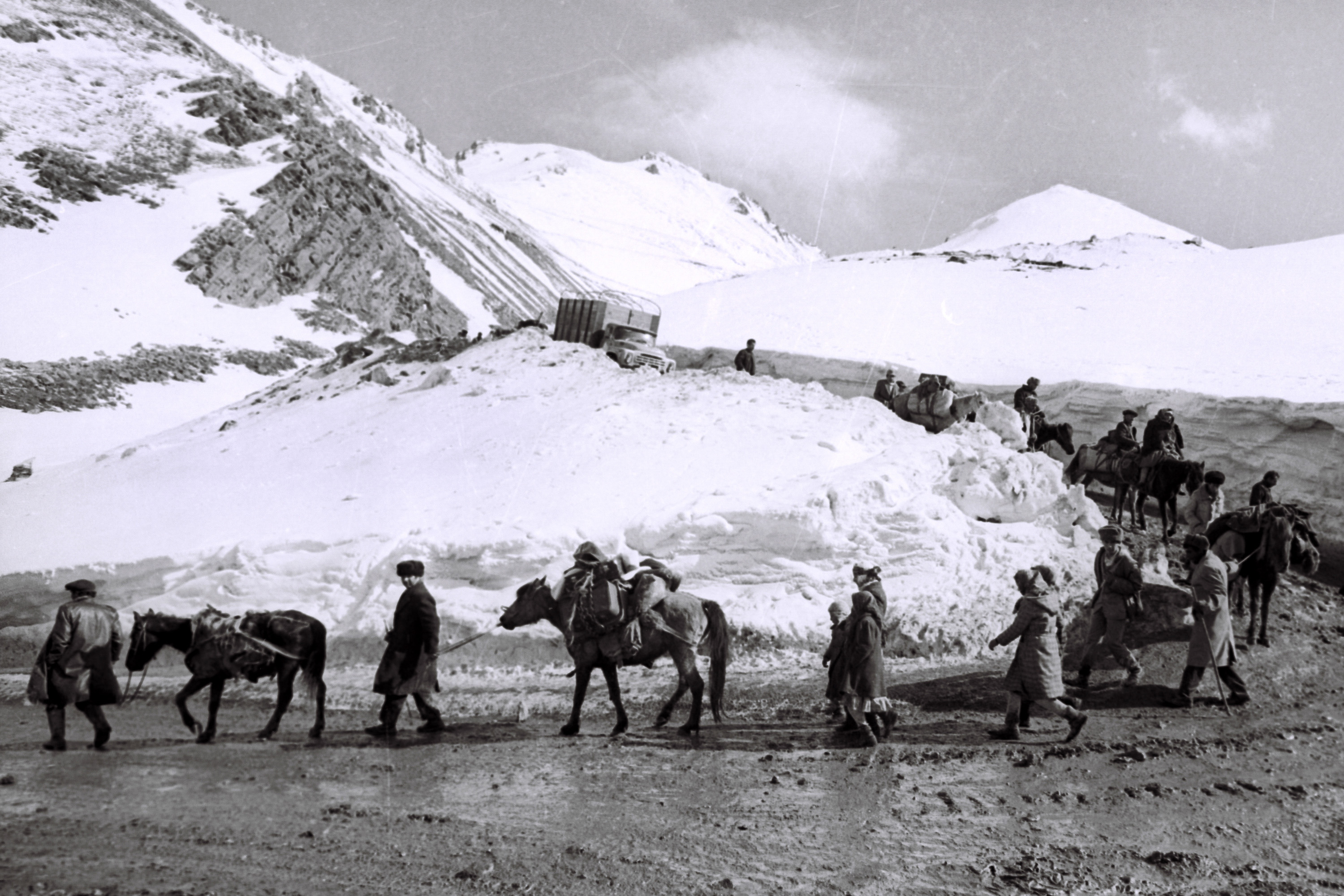
Azerbaijani displaced people from Kalbajar

As the deadline passed on April 2, Melkonian's armor entered the intersection and encountered a line of Azerbaijani tanks and infantry. A firefight ensued but lasted for only several minutes as the defence line was soon battered and destroyed. Many of the Azerbaijani forces were ill-prepared for the attack as Melkonian noted when pointing out to their lack of equipment.

By April 3, the Armenian forces had encircled the capital and resistance had weakened. Azerbaijani commander Surat Huseynov and his 709th brigade, which had been tasked to defending the Murov Mountains, had retreated to Ganja after political and military problems began to unravel upon in the battlefield. An account of the war-weariness afflicting the inhabitants of the town was described by Melkonian's elder brother, Markar:

A downcast enemy soldier with a bandaged hand and a burned leg rides up on a donkey and surrenders. An old man in a faded jacket studded with medals from the Great Patriotic War weeps before leaving his home forever. An elderly woman in a black yazma, waving a torn sheet on a stick, greets Monte and Abo [his radio operator] in Azeri Turkish, then suddenly kneels to the ground to kiss Monte's feet. Surprised and awkward, Monte tries to pull back. Yok! he shouts, "No!" He reflexively bends over and brings the woman up by her arm. "What are you doing?" he asks in Anatolian Turkish, "Don't ever do that!"... [Melkonian] found [in the capital] a row of neat but bleak storefronts and a few chickens. The townsfolk... had not bothered to grab the chickens as provisions for the road. The only other sign of life was a BMP idling in the middle of the road through the center of town.

Although his contingent did not reach in time for the fighting, the city's capital was taken. Aside from some farm life, the town had been largely abandoned. With the taking of the region, Armenian forces now held a continuous swath of territory stretching from Nagorno-Karabakh to Armenia proper, a total of 3,000 square kilometres. In the retreat through the Omar Pass of the Murov mountain range, many Azerbaijani refugees froze to death. With the last helicopters leaving on April 1, they were forced to walk through the heavy snow at freezing temperatures. Nearly 39,000 civilians were processed into the camps at Yevlakh and Dashkasan with as many as 15,000 unaccounted for. Four Azerbaijani Mi-8 helicopters ferrying refugees and wounded out of the conflict zone crashed, the last of which was hit by Armenian forces.

== Political ramifications ==
The offensive provoked international criticism against both the Armenians in Karabakh and the Republic. Vafa Guluzade, the chief adviser to then-president of Azerbaijan, Abulfaz Elchibey, alleged that the region was taken too easily because help arrived from the Russian 128th Regiment (7th Russian Army) stationed in Armenia. This charge was refuted by the operation's commander, Gurgen Dalibaltayan, and others since "Moscow [i.e., the Russian government] was not in total control of Armenian military operations." Armenia's western neighbour, Turkey, halted humanitarian aid coming to through its borders and closed its border with Armenia (the Turkey-Armenia border has remained closed ever since). The United States also condemned the offensive, issuing a "sharp rebuke" and sending an accompanying letter to the Armenian government.

On April 30, 1993, Turkey and Pakistan co-sponsored United Nations Security Council Resolution 822 which called for Armenians in the region to withdraw immediately from Kalbajar and "other recently occupied areas of Azerbaijan". Turkey's President Turgut Özal raised the possibility of military intervention on Azerbaijan's side and set forth on a tour of Turkic former Soviet republics on April 14 (Özal would die of a heart attack just three days later). Iran also condemned the offensive since many refugees in Azerbaijan were fleeing south towards its borders. In an attempt to end the hostilities, U.S., Russia and Turkey reiterated the call for the withdrawal of Armenian troops from the Kalbajar region of Azerbaijan on May 6, which would be followed by formal peace talks.

The loss of Kalbajar was a significant blow to the authority of President Abulfaz Elchibey and his party, the Popular Front of Azerbaijan. On April 12, 1993, Elchibey declared a two-month state of emergency in Azerbaijan. Two months later, the rebellious commander Surat Huseynov marched his troops on Baku, prompting Elchibey to flee the city and leading to the rise of Heydar Aliyev to the presidency.

In June 1993, Armenian president Levon Ter-Petrosyan threw his support behind a plan proposed by Russian, the United States and Turkey according to which Armenian forces would withdraw from Kalbajar district in return for security guarantees for Nagorno-Karabakh. Ter-Petrosyan traveled to Stepanakert to persuade the Armenian leadership of Nagorno-Karabakh to agree to the plan, and offered to remain in Stepanakert for 10 days as a hostage to guarantee the realization of the plan. While the Nagorno-Karabakh leadership agreed, they asked for a one-month delay, and the plan was never realized as Azerbaijan fell into chaos and Armenian forces began a counter-offensive.

== Bibliography ==
- De Waal, Thomas. Black Garden: Armenia and Azerbaijan Through Peace and War. New York: New York University Press, 2003 ISBN 0-8147-1945-7
- Human Rights Watch/Helsinki Report. Azerbaijan: Seven Years of Conflict in Nagorno-Karabakh. New York: Human Rights Watch, 1995 ISBN 1-56432-142-8
- Hunter, Shireen T. The Transcaucasus in Transition: Nation-Building and Conflict. Washington D.C.: The Center for Strategic & International Studies, 1994 ISBN 0-89206-247-9
- Melkonian, Markar. My Brother's Road: An American's Fateful Journey to Armenia. New York: I. B. Tauris, 2005 ISBN 1-85043-635-5
