= Armenian volunteer units during the First Nagorno-Karabakh War =

The term fedayee was originally used during the Armenian national movement of the late 19th and early 20th centuries. Still, it was also used to refer to the Armenian irregular forces in the early 1990s when the dispute with Azerbaijan over Nagorno-Karabakh was turning into the First Nagorno-Karabakh War.

== Role ==
According to some estimates, the detachments played one of the decisive roles in the victory of the Armenian army, as they were the main force that fought in the first years of the war. These volunteer units formed the basis for the Armed Forces of Armenia.

== List ==
Here is a list of the major Armenian volunteer detachments during the First Nagorno-Karabakh War.

Name	In Armenian	Transcribed	Number (max. est.)	Commander	Notes
Armenian National Army	Հայոց Ազգային Բանակ (ՀԱԲ)	Hayots' Azgayin Banak (HAB)		Razmik Vasilyan	The Armenian National Army (ANA) was formed on 24 April 1989 in Yerevan, on the 74th anniversary of the Armenian genocide. It was dissolved in 1990. 15 freedom fighters were killed from the military unit.
Yerkrapah Volunteer Battalion	«Երկրապահ» կամավորական ջոկատ	«Yerkrapah» kamavorakan jokat		Vazgen Sargsyan	Name means "'The country is safe' volunteer brigade"
Liberation Army	Ազատագրական բանակ	Azatagrakan banak	300	Leonid Azkaldian	It was formed in January 1991 in Yerevan by volunteers from Armenia, the diaspora, and Artsakh. It was a large special operations force whose declared goal was to preserve the self-determination of the Armenian population of Nagorno-Karabakh.
Crusaders	«Խաչակիրներ» ջոկատ	«Khachakirner» jokat		Garo Kahkejian	
The Deers	«Եղնիկներ» ջոկատ	«Yeghnikner» jokat	400	Shahen Meghrian	
Shushi Independent Battalion	«Շուշի» առանձնակի գումարտակ	«Shushi» arandznaki gumartak		Jirair Sefilian	Formed from mostly Syrian and Lebanese Armenians. Most were members of the ARF.
Tigran the Great International Military Regiment	«Մեծ Տիգրան» միջազգային ռազմական գունդը	Tigran Mets	400	Armenak Armenakyan	Created in 1990 under the command of Vazgen Sargsyan, this regiment consisted of 40 volunteer detachments.
Davit of Sasun Battalion	«Սասունցի Դավիթ» կամավորական ջոկատ	«Sasunts'i Davit'» kamavorakan jokat	500	Arkady Ter-Tadevosyan	
Dashnaktsakanner	Դաշնակցականներ	Dashnakts'akanner	200	Tatul Krpeyan	Members of the Armenian Revolutionary Federation (Dashanktsutyun).
Sasun	«Սասուն» ջոկատ	«Sasun» jokat	100	Sasun Mikaelyan	The name is ref. Sason.
Cossack Detachment					It consisted of 85 Cossacks who left Kuban voluntarily for Armenia. 14 died during the liberation of the village of Vank. .
Ossetian Battalion	Օսական ջոկատ	Ōsakan jokat		Mirza Abayev	
Ashot the Iron	Աշոտ Երկաթ	Ashot Yerkat'	250	Karapet Jadoyan	name ref. Ashot II of Armenia
General Andranik	Անդրանիկ Զորավար	Andranik Zoravar	400		name ref Andranik
Revengers	Վրիժառուներ	Vrizharuner	200		
Haydat	Հայդատ	Haydat	200		
Mush	Մուշ	Mush	300		Name ref. Muş
Nork-Marash	Նորք-Մարաշ	Nork-Marash	200		name ref. Nork, Yerevan and Kahramanmaraş
Malatia-Sebastia	Մալաթիա - Սեբաստիա	Malat'ia - Sebastia	200	Vahan Zatikyan	name ref; Malatia-Sebastia District
Arabo Battalion	Արաբո	Arabo	200	Simon Achikgyozyan (followed by Manvel Yeghiazaryan)	name ref. Arabo
Glorious Warriors	Պարապած մարտիկներ	Parapats martikner	300	H.G. Mkrtchyan	
Detachment of Hrazdan	Հրազդանյան ջոկատ	Hrazdanyan jokat	200	Zarzand Danielian	
Tseghakron	Ցեղակրոն	Ts'eghakron		Hagop Khachatryan	
Daredevils of Sassoun	Սասնա ծռեր	Sasna tsrer		Samvel Gevorgyan	name ref. Sason
Suicide Squad	Մահապարտների ջոկատ	Mahapartneri jokat	150	Alexander Tamanyan	
Nart	Նարտ	Nart			name ref. Nart saga?
Black Panther	Սեվ հովազ	Sev hovaz		Ruben Egoyan	
Cobra	Կոբրա	Kobra		B. Agasaryan, N. Gulyan	
Aknalich	Ակնալիճ	Aknalich			name ref. Aknalich
Echmiadzin detachment					name ref. Echmiadzin
Hadrut detachment					name ref. Hadrut (town)
Sisian detachment	Սիսական կամավորական զորամիավորում	Sisakan kamavorakan zoramiavorum			It was formed in August 1992 in Sis, from the union of the detachments of the villages of the region. 87 freedom soldiers were killed from the military unit.
Kapan detachment					name ref. Kapan
Martakert detachment				Norayr Danielian	name ref. Martakert
Nikol Duman	Նիկոլ Դուման	Nikol Duman		Armen Martirosyan	
5th Vanadzor Motorized Rifle Volunteer Brigade	Վանաձորի 5-րդ մոտոհրաձգային կամավորական բրիգադ	Vanadzori 5-rd motohradzgayin kamavorakan brigad			It was formed on November 28, 1992. It liberated more than 50 settlements of Artsakh. Among its notable members was journalist Vardan Drikyan.
Artsvik-10 Battalion				Sedrak Saroyan	
Army of Independence					It was founded in late 1989 by members of the Union for National Self-Determination, including Ashot Navasardyan, Movses Gorgisyan, Azat Arshakyan, and Razmik Markosyan.
