= Hayastan (disambiguation) =

Hayastan is the endonym for Armenia.

Hayastan or Hayasdan may also refer to:

- Hayastan (daily), an Armenian newspaper (1917–1918)
- Hayastan (periodical), the journal of ASALA militants (1980–1997)
- Hayastan All Armenian Fund, an American non-profit

== See also ==
- Mayr Hayastan (Mother Armenia), a female personification of Armenia
- Nor Hayastan, independent Armenian-language daily newspaper published in Glendale, California
- Yeritasard Hayastan, an Armenian-American socio-political and economical periodical published by the Social Democrat Hunchakian Party from 1903 until the 2000s
