= Seta Kabranian-Melkonian =

Armenian-American writer (b. 1963)

- Սեդա Գպրանյան-Մելքոնյան
- Born: Seta Kabranian; 26 June 1963 (age 63); Anjar, Lebanon
- Education: Yerevan State University (MA; PhD); University of Alaska Anchorage (MFA)
- Occupation: Writer
- Employer: University of Alaska Anchorage
- Spouse(s): Monte Melkonian (m. 1991; died 1993) Joel Condon
- Children: Saro Condon

Seta Kabranian-Melkonian (Armenian: Սեդա Գպրանեան-Մելքոնեան; b. 1963) is an Armenian-American writer and refugee rights activist. Born in Lebanon, Kabranian moved to Yerevan to study Armenian literature. She met and married Monte Melkonian, who died fighting in the First Nagorno-Karabakh War. She established a non-governmental organization in his name, to provide aid to families of Armenian soldiers and refugees. She later moved to Alaska, where she studied creative nonfiction, contributed to research on refugees and worked as a faculty member of the University of Alaska Anchorage.

== Biography ==
Seta Kabranian was born in the Lebanese Armenian town of Anjar, in 1963. One of six daughters, Kabranian was born into a family that had survived the Armenian genocide.

When she was fifteen, Kabranian met Monte Melkonian, who at the time was fighting in the Lebanese Civil War as a member of the Armenian Secret Army for the Liberation of Armenia (ASALA). In 1981, Kabranian moved to Yerevan, in the Armenian Soviet Socialist Republic (ASSR), where she studied Armenian literature at Yerevan State University. After spending 1983–1985 in hiding with Melkonian in Europe, and staying in Lebanon and the United States for a short period, Kabranian returned to Armenia to stay. She graduated as a Master of Arts during the time of the ASSR, and later graduated as a Doctor of Philosophy after the restoration of the Armenian Republic.

Following the Armenian declaration of independence, in 1991, Kabranian and Melkonian married at the monastery of Geghard. Melkonian died two years later, while fighting in the First Nagorno-Karabakh War. After the war's conclusion, Kabranian established the Monte Melkonian Fund, to aid the families of soldiers that were wounded or killed in action. Kabranian began to express distaste with the social stratification that had taken place in Armenia after the war, noting the stark divide between the Armenians living in poverty and the rich members of the diaspora, the latter of whom had brought with them a culture of luxury cars and casinos. American journalist Thomas Goltz noted that Kabranian sympathised more with Azeri victims of the First Nagorno-Karabakh War than those that had come to dominate the economy of Armenia.

After her work for a refugee aid NGO, Kabranian moved to the United States. There she began studying creative nonfiction at the University of Alaska Anchorage (UAA), graduating as a Master of Fine Arts. She continues to work at UAA as a teacher, and is an affiliate editor for The Alaska Quarterly Review. She has also continued her activism in refugee aid, as president of the Society for Orphaned Armenian Relief in Anchorage.

== Academic work ==
In her academic research, Kabranian has pursued her interest in refugee rights and social justice. Together with Monte's brother Markar Melkonian, Kabranian co-authored My Brother's Road, a book about Monte Melkonian which was published in 2005 by I. B. Tauris. In 2017, Kabranian herself published The Consecrated Ones, a book about the life of Garlen Ananian written in the Armenian language. She has also published works in the magazine Hetq and the literary magazines Iknagir and Atticus Review.

In 2015, Kabranian published an article on "Ethical Concerns with Refugee Research". Defining a "refugee" as a person that has been forcibly displaced from their country of origin due to natural disasters, persecution or war, Kabranian found that the total number of refugees experienced an exponential growth during the first two decades of the 21st century. In her research, Kabranian employed a methodological pluralism, which combined quantitative and qualitative research on the subject. She demonstrated that obtaining refugee status provides many opportunities, including the improvement of living conditions and the recognition of their fundamental rights, irrespective of different laws on refugee status in different countries of destination.

In the wake of the displacement of Armenians from Nagorno-Karabakh in 2023, Kabranian was among dozens of Armenian academics that called for the international community to aid the displaced refugees and take action against what they described as an act of ethnic cleansing by Azerbaijan.

== Selected work ==
Books

- Melkonian, Markar; Kabranian-Melkonian, Seta (2005). My Brother's Road: An American's Fateful Journey to Armenia. I. B. Tauris. ISBN 1-85043-635-5.
- Kabranian-Melkonian, Seta (2017). Նուիրեալները: Կառլէն Անանեանի Անցած Ճամբով [The Consecrated Ones: Garlen Ananian's Path]. Los Angeles: Abril Books. ISBN 978-0979684210. OCLC 1004672778.

Journal articles

- Kabranian-Melkonian, Seta (2015). "Ethical Concerns With Refugee Research". Journal of Human Behavior in the Social Environment. 25 (7): 714–722. doi:10.1080/10911359.2015.1032634.
- Kabranian, Seta; Wasko, Paul (2021). "Sequencing Instruction and Student Learning through the e-Portfolio". CSHSE Bulletin. University of Alaska Anchorage: 6–7.
- Kabranian-Melkonian, Seta (2022). "Գէթ". Journal of the Society for Armenian Studies. 29 (1): 133–134. doi:10.1163/26670038-12342776.

Web articles

- Kabranian-Melkonian, Seta (23 May 2019). "A Bottle of Dirt". Atticus Review.
- Kabranian-Melkonian, Seta (17 April 2023). "Artsakh and the Truth About the Legend of Monte Melkonian". The Markaz Review.
- Kabranian-Melkonian, Seta (16 October 2023). "Forging Peace for Artsakh—The Debacle of Nagorno Karabagh". The Markaz Review.

== Bibliography ==
- Dechev, Teodor (2019). ""The black January" in Baku – 1990, the Karabakh conflict and the dissolution of the USSR". Politics & Security (in Russian). 3 (4): 71–100.
- Goltz, Thomas (2000). "Remembering a winter of discontent: Letter from the south Caucasus". The Washington Quarterly. 23 (3): 69–76. doi:10.1162/016366000561187.
- Krikorian, Onnik (4 March 2000). "A Conversation with Seta Melkonian". onnik-krikorian.com.
- Martínez Sanesteban, Irene (30 September 2020). Refugiats i refugiades ambientals: una revisió sistemàtica (PDF) (Thesis) (in Catalan). Autonomous University of Barcelona.
- Nalbantian, Tsolin (2018). "Armenians in the Middle East: From marginalization to the everyday". In Rowe, Paul S. (ed.). Routledge Handbook of Minorities in the Middle East. Routledge. doi:10.4324/9781315626031-20. ISBN 9781315626031.
- "Where is the international will to respond to the ethnic cleansing taking place in Artsakh?". Armenian Weekly. 14 November 2023. ISSN 0004-2374.
- "Seta Kabranian-Melkonian". Atticus Review. 2019.
- "Author: Seta Kabranian-Melkonian". The Markaz Review. 2023.
- "SOAR-Anchorage Chapter". Society for Orphaned Armenian Relief. 2020.
- "Seta Kabranian Ph.D." University of Alaska Anchorage. 2023.
