= Qarabulaq, Goygol =

Garabulag Մարտունաշեն • Martunashen
- Azerbaijani: Qarabulaq
- Location within Azerbaijan
- Coordinates: 40°27′52″N 46°23′42″E
- Country: Azerbaijan
- District: Goygol

Population
  - Total: 252
- Time zone: UTC+4 (AZT)

Qarabulaq (Garabulag; Armenian: Կարաբուլաղ, romanized: Karabulagh or Armenian: Մարտունաշեն, romanized: Martunashen) is a village and municipality in the Goygol District of Azerbaijan on the recently asphalted lane between Chaykand and Sarisu. The village had an Armenian majority prior to the First Nagorno-Karabakh War and Operation Ring.

== History ==
The Armenian population of the village was forcefully evicted by Soviet special forces during Operation Ring in 1991. The fact that the population was able to successfully flee is often attributed to the actions of Simon Achikgyozyan of the Arabo Detachment. Achikgyozyan died on 30 April 1991, defending the town by concentrating the fire from oncoming tanks against himself while the townspeople fled through the forests to safety. The Armenian population of the village was forcibly deported and used to live as refugees in the Republic of Artsakh.
