= Arabo Battalion =

- Armenian: Արաբո կամավորական ջոկատ
- Active: 4 October 1989-1994
- Country: Armenian SSR; Armenia
- Branch: Armenian Ground Forces
- Type: infantry detachment
- Size: 200
- Garrison/HQ: Republic of Artsakh
- Nickname: "The Eagle" (Armenian: Արծիվ)
- Engagements: First Karabakh War ∟ Khojaly massacre ∟ Operation Goranboy ∟ Capture of Garadaghly

Commanders
- Notable commanders: Simon Achikgyozyan; Manvel Yeghiazaryan; Monte Melkonian

The Arabo Volunteer Detachment (Armenian: «Արաբո» կամավորական ջոկատ) or Arabo Battalion was a paramilitary Armenian volunteer unit during the First Nagorno-Karabakh War, composed of Armenians mainly from Armenia and Karabakh, as well as Armenians from abroad. It was an ARF-affiliated unit.

== History ==
The group was originally named after Garegin Nzhdeh. However, the emergence of a group called "Garegin Nzhdeh" among other Armenian groups led to the change of the group's name to "Arabo". "Arabo" was the pseudonym of Arakel Mkhitarian, who revolted against the Ottomans in the 19th century and was eventually killed by Kurdish groups. The group was established in Yerevan in October 1989 with the participation of Armenian nationalists from Lebanon, Palestine, Syria and France, as well as experienced officers and servicemen who served in the Soviet Army. On 9 October 1989, the number of members of the group was 24, and on January 19, 1990, the number of members of the group increased with the arrival of groups of 10, 15, 20.

=== Operations ===
At the initial stage, Arabo operated along the Armenia–Azerbaijan border. It took part in the Capture of Garadaghly, where its fighters, together with fighters from the battalion and from other volunteer units, reportedly gathered about three dozen Azerbaijani captives in a ditch and killed them, as a way to "avenge" the death of another comrade the day before, against the orders of Monte Melkonian.
