= Tatul, Armenia =

Tatul Թաթուլ
- Location within Armenia Location within Aragatsotn
- Coordinates: 40°23′21″N 43°48′51″E
- Country: Armenia
- Province: Aragatsotn
- Municipality: Talin
- Elevation: 1,540 m (5,050 ft)

Population (2011)
  - Total: 822
- Time zone: UTC+4
  - Summer (DST): UTC+5

Tatul (Armenian: Թաթուլ) is a village in the Talin Municipality of the Aragatsotn Province of Armenia. The village was inhabited by Armenians until 1918. The village was renamed after the First Nagorno-Karabakh War commander and the National Hero of Armenia Tatul Krpeyan, who was born in the village.
