= İstisu, Kalbajar =

Istisu
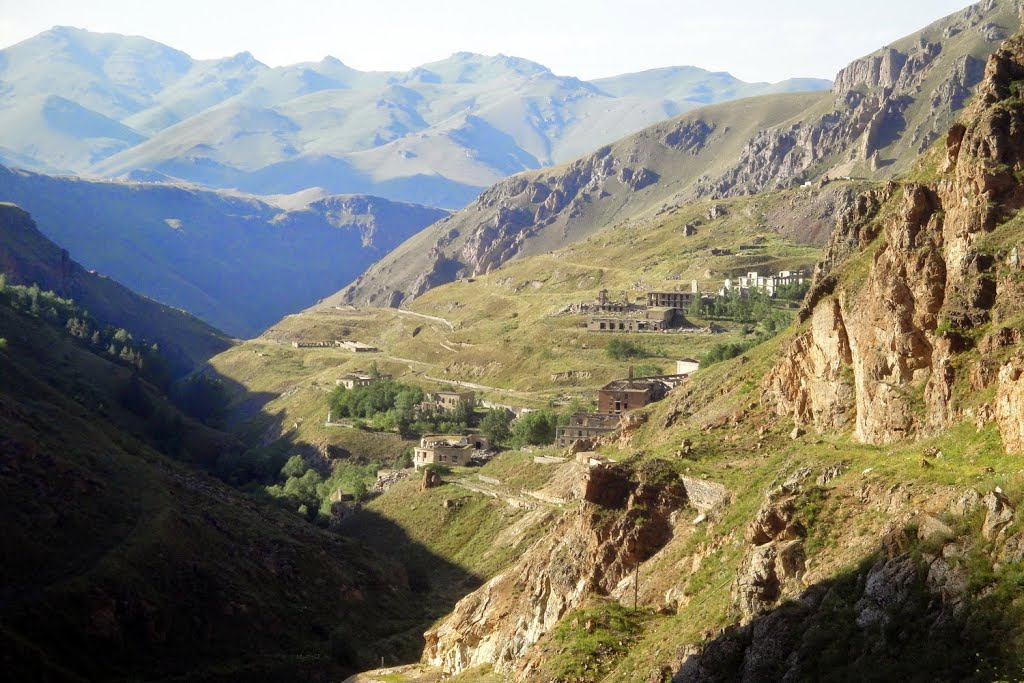

- Location within Azerbaijan Location within East Zangezur Economic Region
- Coordinates: 39°56′53″N 45°57′42″E
- Country: Azerbaijan
- District: Kalbajar
- Time zone: UTC+4 (AZT)

İstisu (Istisu, lit. 'warm water' in Azerbaijani) is a village in the Kalbajar District of Azerbaijan.

Situated in a river valley, Istisu has historically been a resort town, and during the Soviet period, it attracted people from all over the USSR to be treated at the mineral-springs baths located in the area.

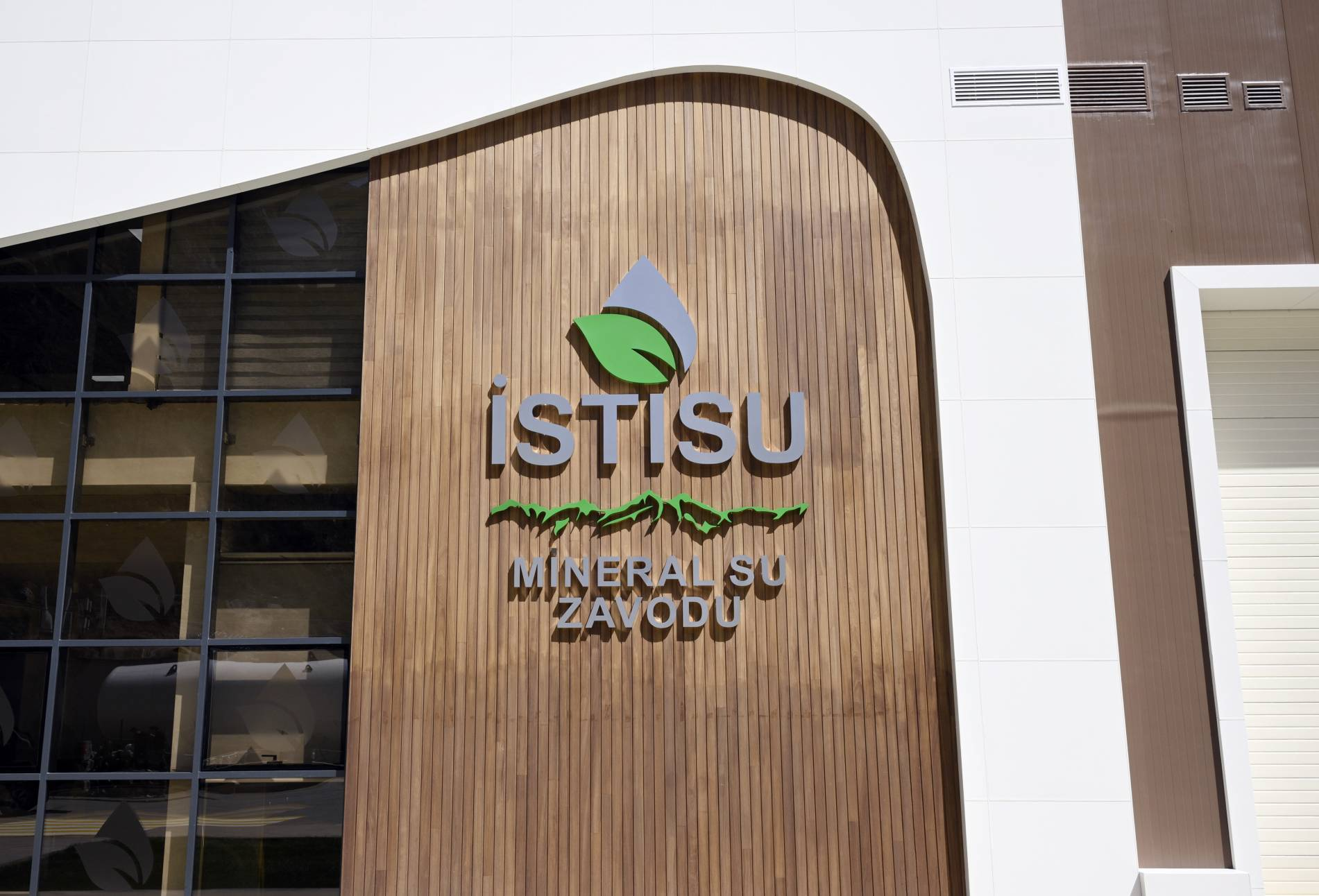
Istisu mineral water factory

== History ==
In the early Middle Ages, the royal baths of the rulers of Caucasian Albania were located in İstisu. There is a resort in the town, known as Istisu resort.

The village was located in the Armenian-occupied territories surrounding Nagorno-Karabakh, coming under the control of ethnic Armenian forces during the First Nagorno-Karabakh War in the early 1990s. The village subsequently became part of the breakaway Republic of Artsakh as part of its Shahumyan Province, referred to as Jermajur (Armenian: Ջերմաջուր). In 2018 it was reported that work has begun on a privately funded factory to produce mineral water. İstisu was returned to Azerbaijan on 25 November 2020 as part of the 2020 Nagorno-Karabakh ceasefire agreement.

== See also ==
- Istisu resort
