= Assassination of Galip Ozmen =

1980 murder of Turkish agent in Athens

Galip Ozmen was the Administrative Attaché of Turkish Embassy in Greece and Turkish intelligence (MIT) agent, who was assassinated in Athens on 31 July 1980 by the Armenian Secret Army for the Liberation of Armenia (ASALA). An Armenian gunman attacked Galip Ozmen, 45, and his family as they were waiting in their automobile in the Pangrati area of Athens. Galip Ozmen was killed and his fourteen-year-old daughter, Neslihan Ozmen, later died of her wounds. His wife, Sevil Ozmen, and his sixteen-year-old son, Kaan Ozmen, were seriously wounded, but survived.

Witnesses said the gunman, a short, young man with dark, curly hair, approached Ozmen's car, pulled a pistol out of a plastic bag and fired into the car. Ozmen died en route to the hospital. His daughter, Neslihan, was reported upon arrival to the hospital to be "clinically dead" with a brain injury. She fell in coma and died the next day. Sevil Ozmen, the diplomat's wife, was wounded in her right arm and their elder son, Kaan, was shot in the shoulder. Only 12-year-old Alper Ozmen, the youngest member of the family, escaped injury.

ASALA claimed responsibility for the attack in a tape-recorded message telephoned to Associated Press, stating that "our enemy is the Turkish regime, the NATO and the reactionary Armenian forces."

The assassination was carried out by Monte Melkonian. Melkonian was unable to clearly see the passengers, who were obscured by darkly tinted window glass, and believed they were all diplomats. Melkonian was shocked to learn that the other passengers were Ozmen's family and later wrote that he would have spared them if he had a clearer view. However, he considered Galip Ozmen to be a legitimate target as in Melkonian's opinion he had freely chosen to represent a regime that occupied most of the Armenian homeland and committed the Armenian Genocide, alongside other crimes such as occupying Northern Cyprus and killing thousands of Kurds. As Melkonian fled the scene, the diplomat's son got out of the car, holding his gunshot wound, and together with a few bystanders tried to pursue Mekonian, but the latter had outran them.

After Galip's assassination, his son revealed to Greek journalists that his father had been a spy for the National Intelligence Organization of Turkey. The Turkish press claimed Ozmen had been killed for spying on Armenian organizations in Greece, although ASALA was unaware that he was a spy.
