= Garadaghly, Nagorno-Karabakh =

Garadaghly / Varanda Qaradağlı / Վարանդա
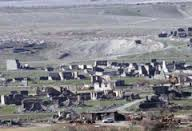

- Location within Azerbaijan Location within Karabakh Economic Region
- Coordinates: 39°47′49″N 46°58′32″E
- Country: Azerbaijan
  - District: Khojavend

Population (2015)
  - Total: 110
- Time zone: UTC+4 (AZT)

Garadaghly (Azerbaijani: Qaradağlı) or Varanda (Armenian: Վարանդա) is a village in the Khojavend District of Azerbaijan, in the region of Nagorno-Karabakh. The village had an Azerbaijani-majority population prior to their expulsion during the First Nagorno-Karabakh War.

== History ==
During the Soviet period, the village was part of the Martuni District of the Nagorno-Karabakh Autonomous Oblast.

In early February 1992, during the First Nagorno-Karabakh War, Armenian forces captured the village as well as the villages of Malibeyli and Aghdaban. Their inhabitants were expelled, resulting in the death of at least 99 civilians and 140 injuries. The attack on the village resulted in the deaths of more than 20 people and the injuries of 15 others. According to the State Commission [sic] of the Republic of Azerbaijan on Prisoners of War, Hostages, and Missing Persons, 26 citizens of Azerbaijan have been reported missing since Armenian forces captured the village.

Following the First Nagorno-Karabakh War, the village has been administrated as part of the Martuni Province of the Republic of Artsakh.

== Economy and culture ==
The population is mainly engaged in agriculture and animal husbandry. As of 2015, the village has a municipal building, a secondary school, and a medical centre.

== Demographics ==
According to the 1910 publication of the Caucasian Calendar, Garadaghly had 500 inhabitants in 1908, the majority of whom were Tatars (later known as Azerbaijanis), the village also had an Azerbaijani majority in 1989. Azerbaijani IDPs from the village mostly settled in the Beylagan District of Azerbaijan. The village was settled by Armenians after the First Nagorno-Karabakh War.

In the present-day, the village has an ethnic Armenian-majority population, with 70 inhabitants in 2005, and 110 inhabitants in 2015.
