= Mardakert and Martuni Offensives =

1992 battles of the First Nagorno-Karabakh War

- Part of the First Nagorno-Karabakh War
Date	Late summer to early autumn of 1992
Location	Mardakert and Martuni, Nagorno-Karabakh.
Result	Armenian victory

Belligerents
Nagorno-Karabakh	Azerbaijan

Commanders and leaders
(Republic of Artsakh) Monte Melkonian	Unknown

Strength
3,000 soldiers 10–20 T-72 tanks 20 APCs	At least 6,000 soldiers 32 T-72 tanks 50 APCs and IFVs

Casualties and losses
200–400 killed 2–3 tanks destroyed	600–1,200 killed Dozens of tanks Destroyed

The Mardakert and Martuni Offensives took place during the late summer and early autumn months of 1992 in fighting between Armenians and Azeris during the First Nagorno-Karabakh War.

On June 27, the Azeri offensive was launched towards the adjacent village of Jardar where Armenian commando Monte Melkonian's fighters had dug in to confront them. The use of anti-tank projectiles decimated the Azeris' armor and allowed the detachments to resist being overrun. The presence of the armored vehicles were also proven to be useless in a close combat environment as they were found to be vulnerable targets where maneuvering space was limited and where the defenders easily picked off vehicles that strayed away from the fighting. Following the next day and subsequent weeks, several more offensives were launched by the Azeris, all of which were staved off and credited to Melkonian's organization and command leadership.

== Mediation by the CSCE ==
In late August, after a stall in talks hosted by the CSCE in Rome earlier in the month, diplomatic relations between the two countries increased and both nations agreed to a truce signing in Almaty, arranged by Kazakhstan's president Nursultan Nazarbayev, that would be observed from September 1 and be monitored by international observers in the enclave.

The cease fire, like the many others arranged before it, collapsed within a few days as all three sides were drawn back into the conflict. Azerbaijan made several gains in intense fighting between Armenian forces and, on September 7, was estimated to be holding 25% of the disputed enclave including the northern region of Mardakert. On September 23, the Azeris opened up a new offensive that attacked from several different directions, intending mainly to close the Lachin Corridor in an operation that killed several hundred Armenian and Azeri soldiers.

Armenian forces captured the surrounding Azeri held villages on October 2. The attack culminated in the capture of the Azeris' headquarters at Kurapatkino, putting an end to the shellings upon Martuni. The Armenians also received training from Russian military forces and downed an estimated twenty Azeri fighter aircraft, in this time period, with the use of shoulder-fired Strela-4 and Strela-10 surface-to-air missiles.
