= Monteavan =

Monteavan Մոնթեավան
- Location within Armenia
- Coordinates: 40°12′30″N 44°18′30″E
- Country: Armenia
- Province: Armavir

Population (2011)
  - Total: 946
- Time zone: UTC+4 ( )
  - Summer (DST): UTC+5 ( )

Monteavan (Armenian: Մոնթեավան), previously known as Shahumyani Trchnafabrika (Armenian: Շահումյանի թռչնաֆաբրիկա, lit. 'Shahumyan poultry factory'), is a village in the Armavir Province of Armenia. The name Monteavan derives from the left-wing militant Monte Melkonian.
