= Zülfüqarlı =

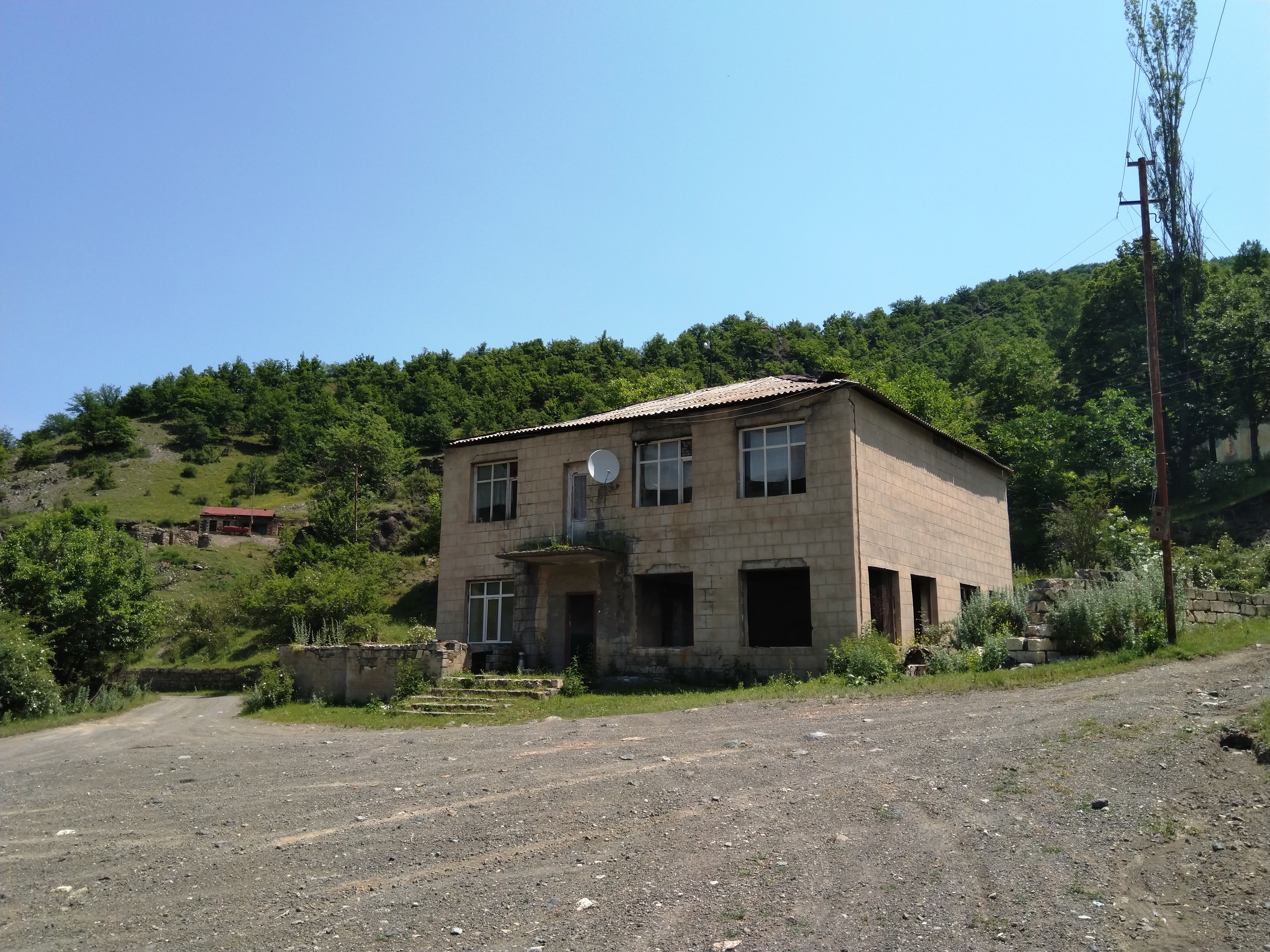

- Location within Azerbaijan Location within East Zangezur Economic Region
- Coordinates: 40°04′13.7″N 46°14′26.7″E
- Country: Azerbaijan
- District: Kalbajar

Population (2015)
  - Total: 103
- Time zone: UTC+4 (AZT)

Zülfüqarlı (Zulfugarly) is a village in the Kalbajar District of Azerbaijan.

== History ==
Zülfüqarlı (Zulfuqarli) is a village in the Kalbajar District of Azerbaijan's Karabakh (East Zangezur) region, situated along the Tutqun River (a right tributary of the Tartarchay). It is believed that the village is named after the legendary sword Zulfiqar used by Ali. The village was located in the Armenian-occupied territories surrounding Nagorno-Karabakh, coming under the control of ethnic Armenian forces during the First Nagorno-Karabakh War in the early 1990s. The village subsequently became part of the breakaway Republic of Artsakh as part of its Shahumyan Province, referred to as Zuar (Armenian: Զուար). It was returned to Azerbaijan as part of the 2020 Nagorno-Karabakh ceasefire agreement.

== Economy ==
The Istisu thermal spring is located close to the village. It can be used as a geothermal energy source.

== Demographics ==
The village had 73 inhabitants in 2005, and 103 inhabitants in 2015.

== Gallery ==
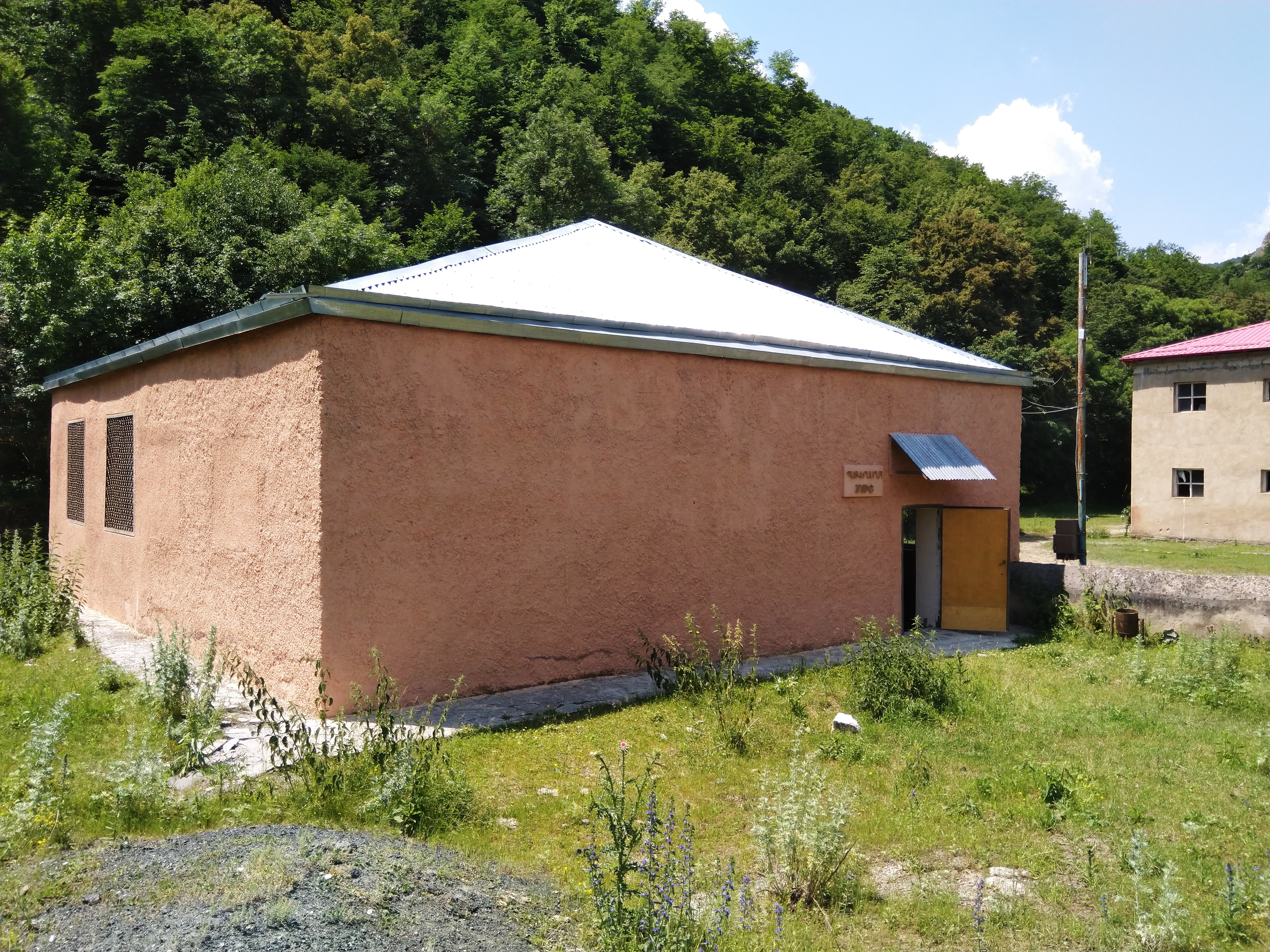
Gallery building in the village

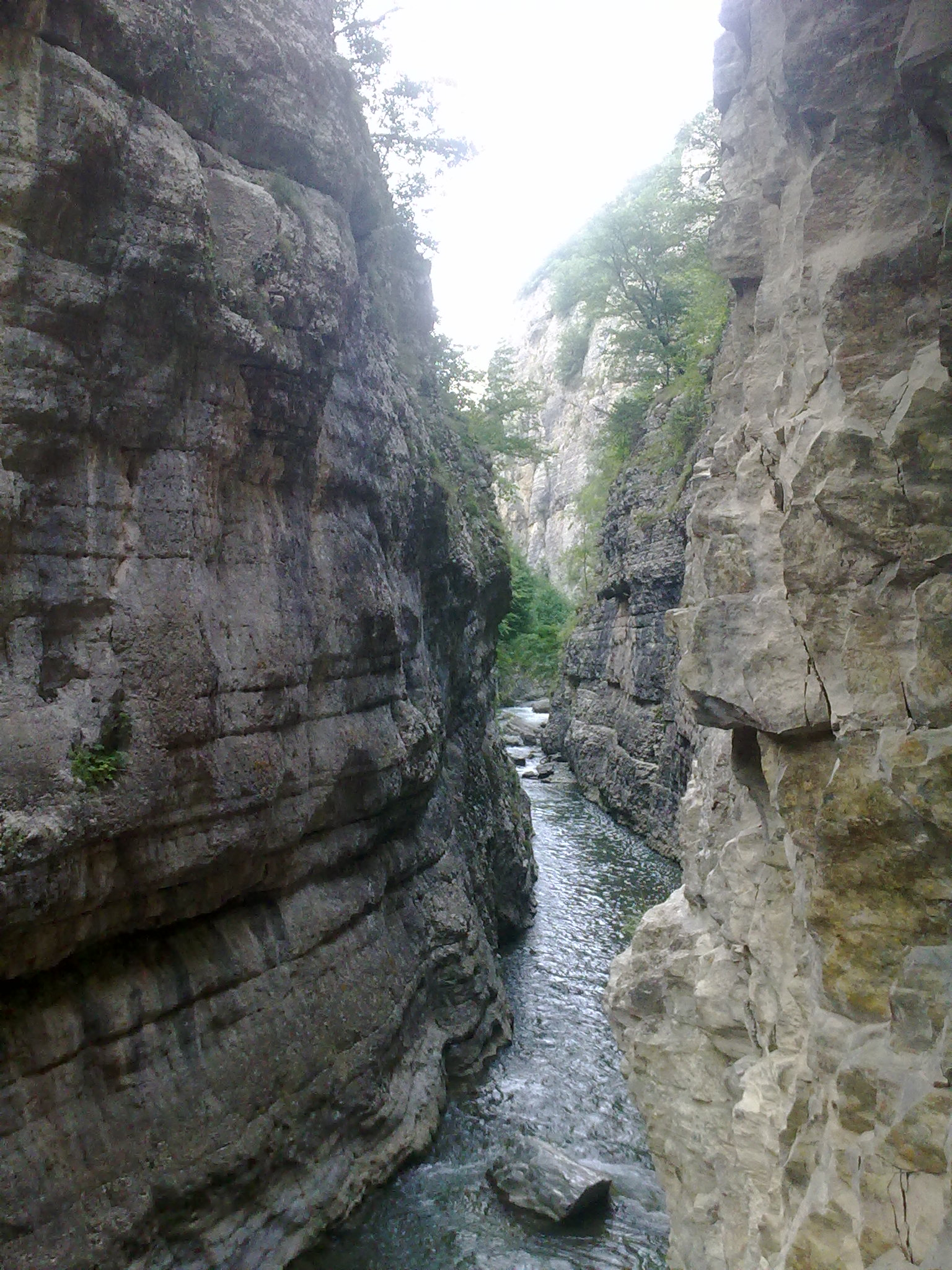
Tutqun river gorge

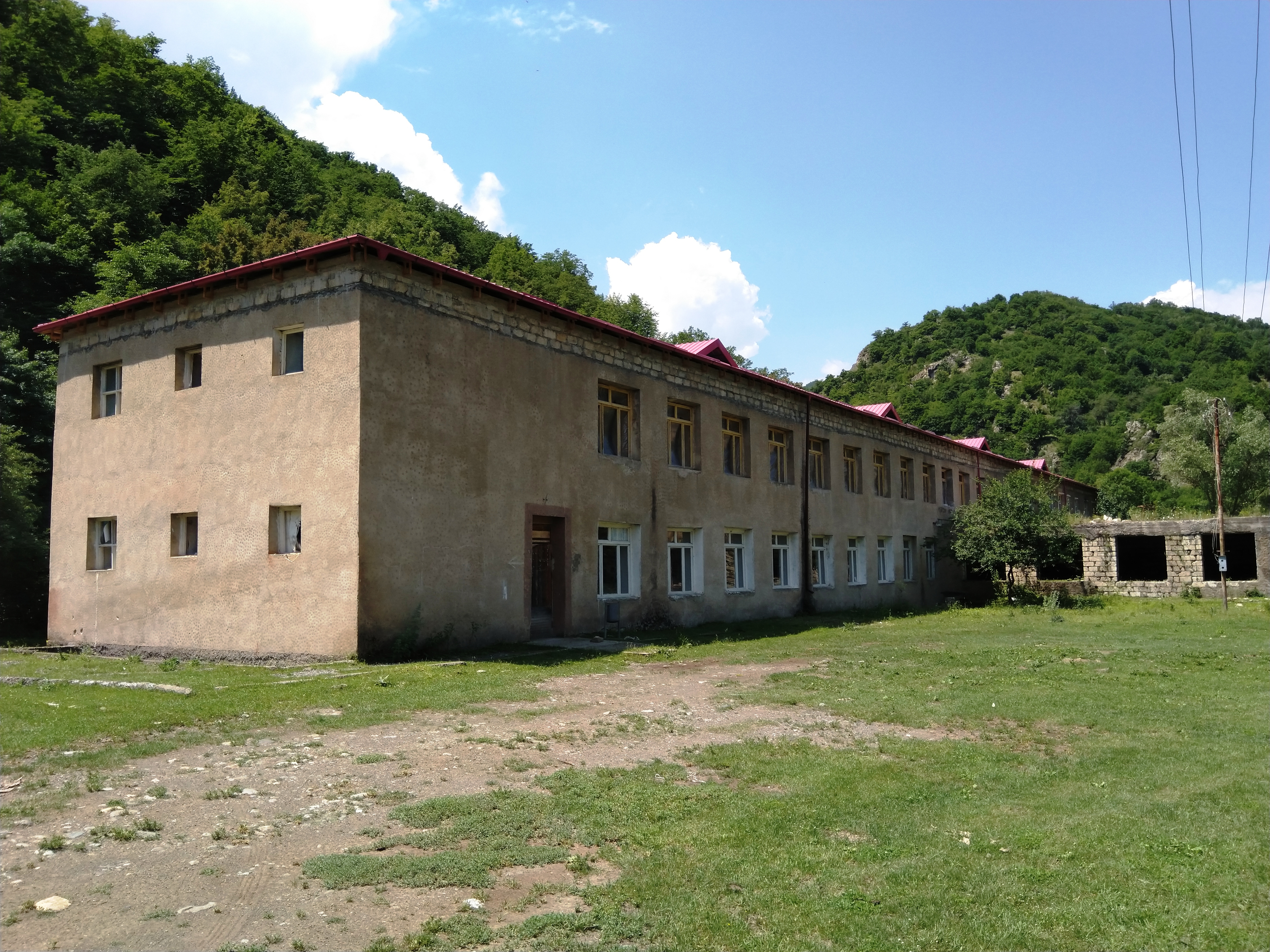
Community school

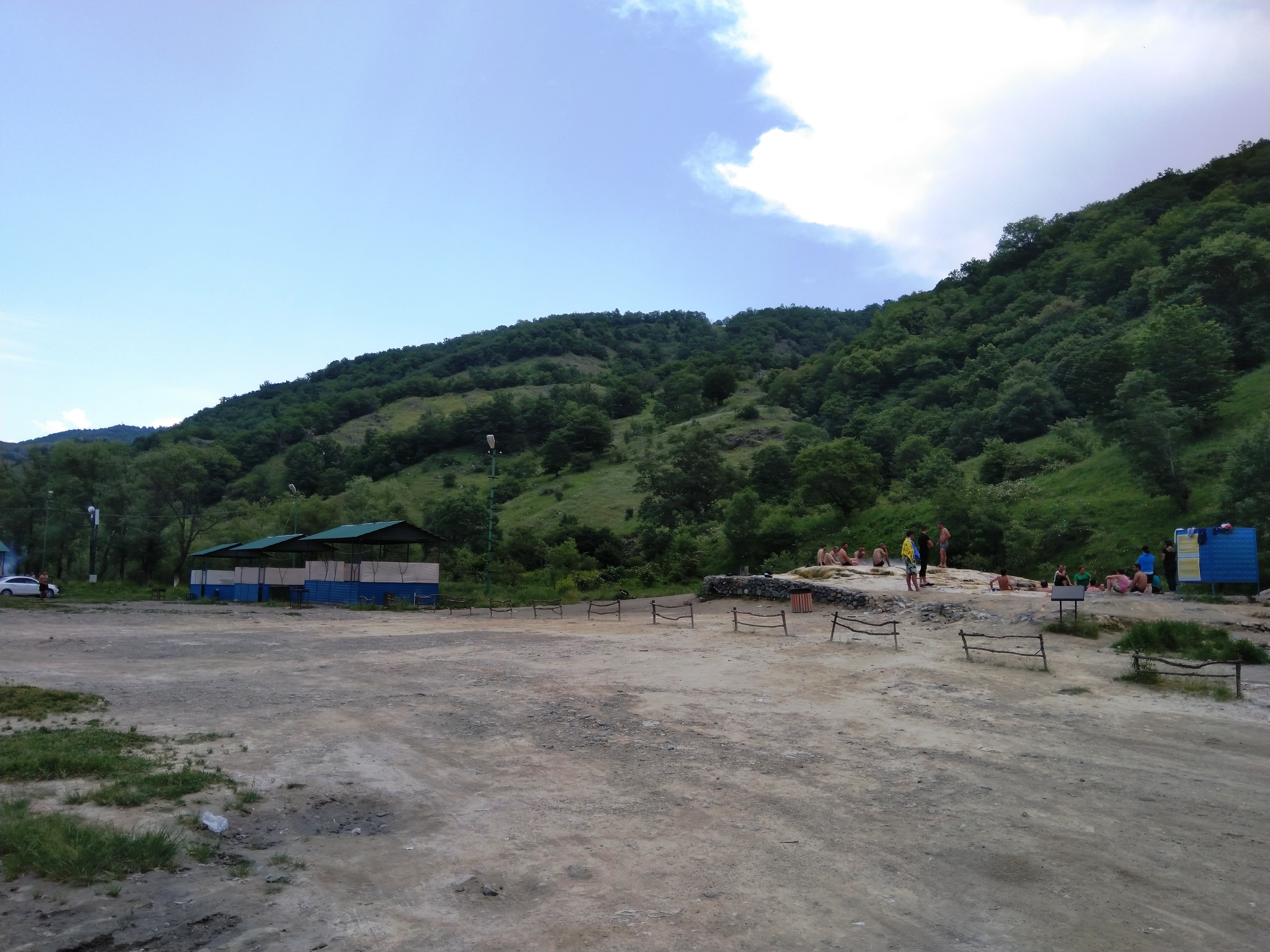
The hot springs and its surroundings near the village

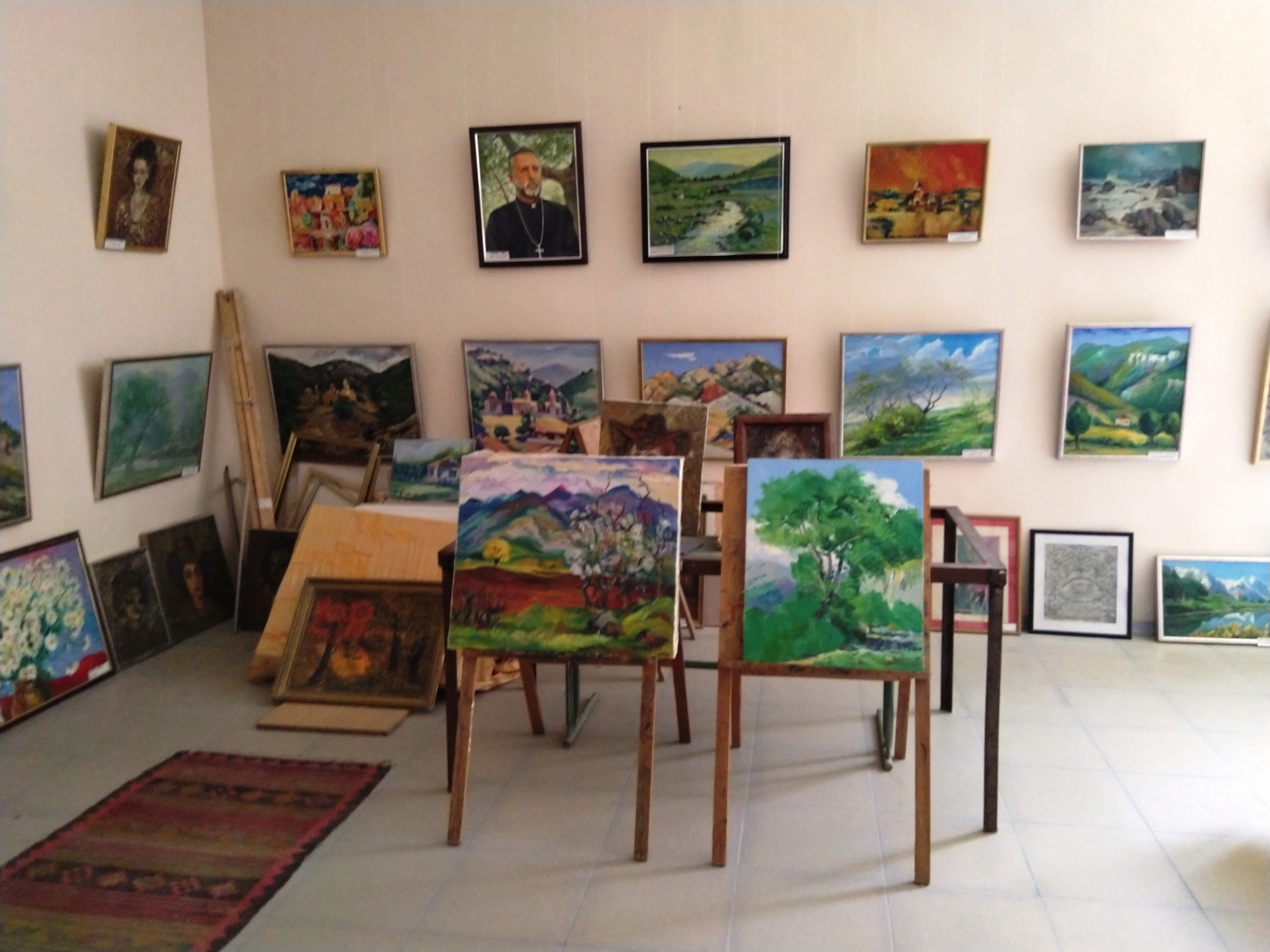
Exhibits from the village community gallery

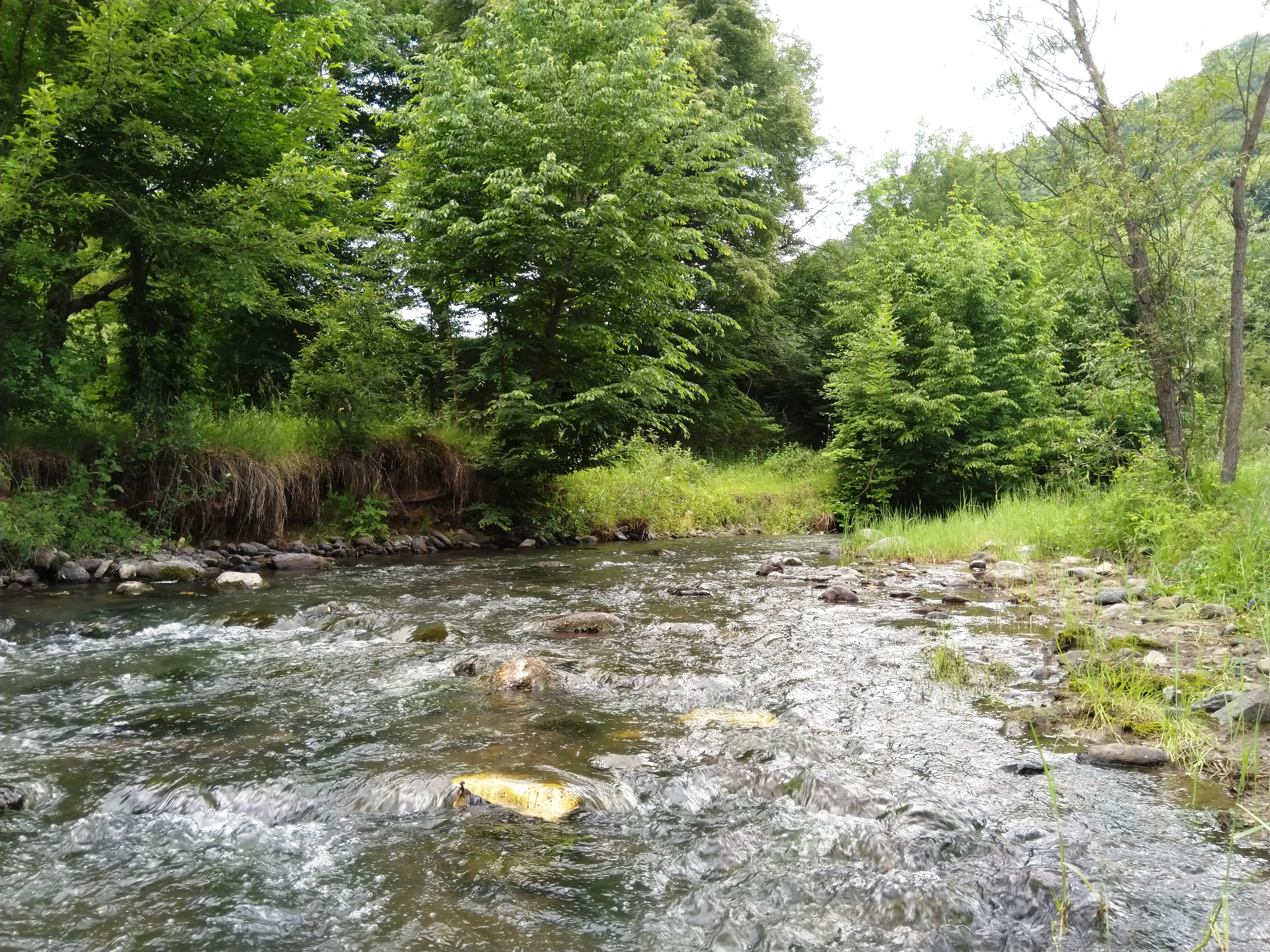
The upper part of the Tutqun river

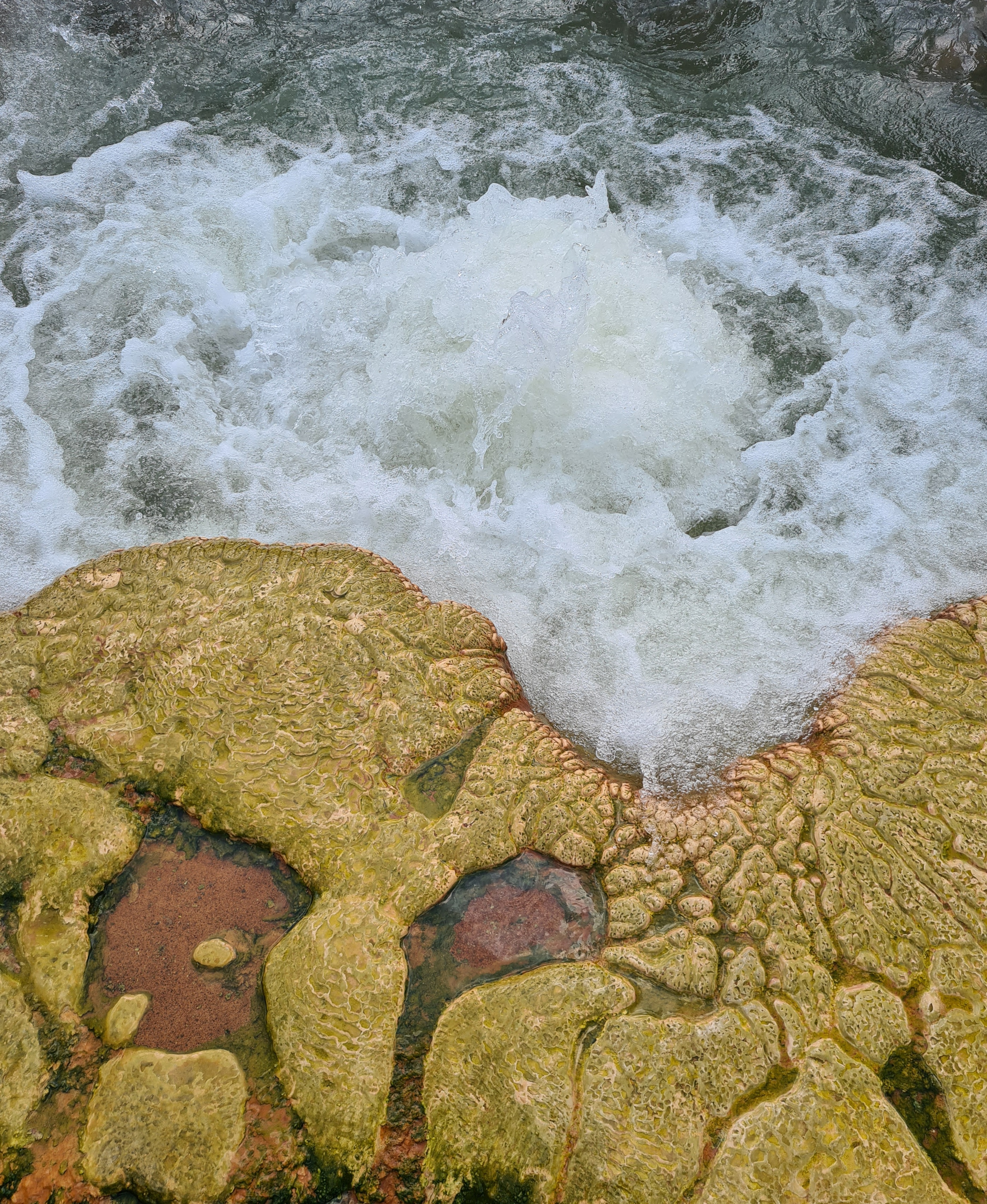
Istisu thermal spring close to Zülfüqarlı village

== See also ==
- Istisu resort
