= Shushi Independent Battalion =

The 77th Shushi Separate Battalion or Shushi Independent Battalion (Armenian: «Շուշի» առանձնակի գումարտակ) was a unit of the Artsakh Defence Army. It was formed on 1 September 1992, originally consisting of over 1,000 soldiers including many from the Armenian diaspora. Most soldiers in the battalion were members of the ARF. It took part in Operation Horadiz.

== The battalion in modern Artsakh ==
A memorial to the fallen military personnel from the battalion was erected on the southern top of Mount Aragats in 2003. After the 2016 Nagorno-Karabakh clashes, the ARF helped the Ministry of Defense of Armenia in setting up a volunteer reserve battalion, tracing back its heritage from the Shushi independent battalion.

== See also ==
- Armenian volunteer units during the First Nagorno-Karabakh War
