= Istisu resort =

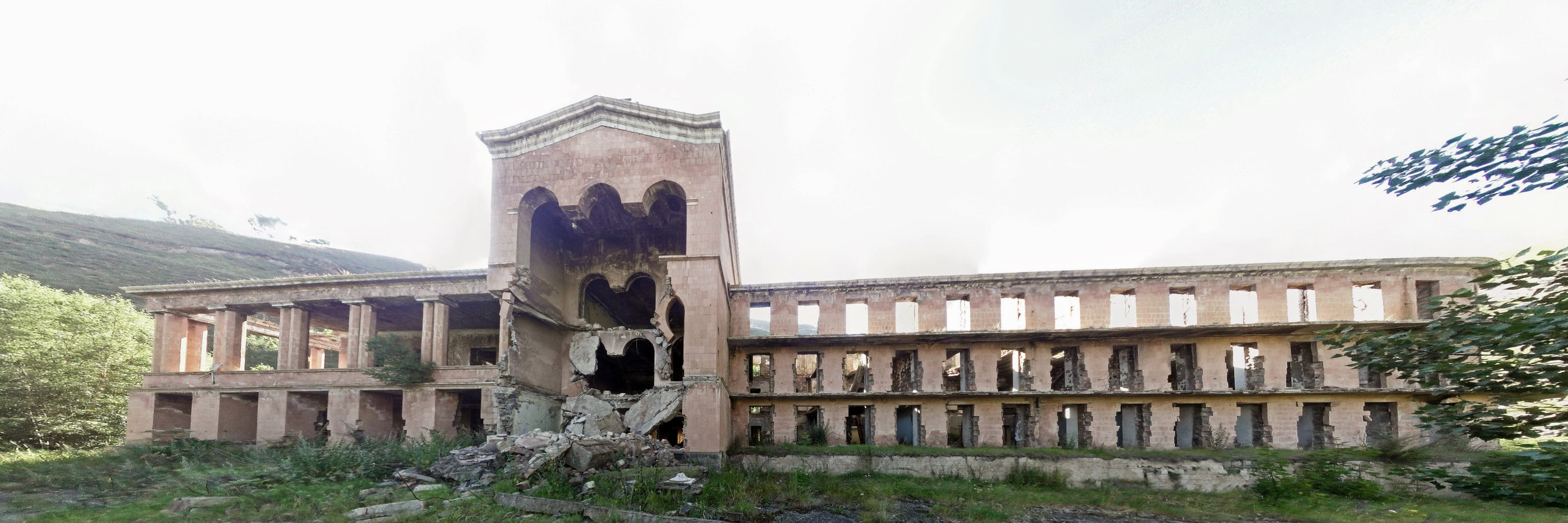
- Istisu sanatory during the Armenian occupation

Geography
- Location: Istisu, Kalbajar, Azerbaijan
- Coordinates: 39.948056°N 45.961667°E

History
- Constructed: 1925
- Opened: 1927

Istisu resort (Azerbaijani: İstisu kurortu) or Istisu sanatorium (Azerbaijani: İstisu sanatoriyası) is a treatment and recreation centre established in 1927 in Istisu (literally warm water), Kalbajar District of Azerbaijan.

In 1970, the Soviet government included the Istisu resort in the list of resorts that have all-union importance. During the Soviet period, about 50 thousand people were treated here every year. In the 1980s, a water filling plant was built as part of the sanatorium. More than 800 thousand litres of mineral water were produced daily from the Upper Istisu, Lower Istisu, Goturlu and Tutgun mineral water fields. During the First Nagorno-Karabakh War, after the occupation of Kalbajar by Armenian forces in 1993, the resort was completely destroyed. The town subsequently became part of the self-proclaimed Republic of Artsakh as part of its Shahumyan Province, referred to as Jermajur (Armenian: Ջերմաջուր). In 2018, it was reported that work has begun on a privately funded factory to produce mineral water. Kalbajar was returned to Azerbaijan on 25 November 2020, as part of a tripartite ceasefire agreement signed by the Presidents of Azerbaijan and Russia, and the Prime Minister of Armenia, after the 2020 Nagorno-Karabakh war.

== History ==
Istisu resort is located in the town of the same name, in Kalbajar District of Azerbaijan, and at an altitude of 2,225 metres (7,300 ft). The springs here were formed as a result of swelling and cracking of the Earth's crust after a large seismic event in 30 September 1139, in Ganja. Robert Hewsen writes that, in the early Middle Ages, the royal baths of the rulers of Caucasian Albania were located here, though according to other scholars the healing properties of the springs have been known to the local population since the 12th century. Istisu literally means warm water in Azerbaijani. The resulting water has hyperthermic, carbon dioxide, hydro-carbonate-chloride-sulphate-sodium in it. There are 12 active mineral springs within the resort. The temperature of the mineral water is 58.8 celsius. These spring waters are rich in lithium, bromine, iodine, arsenic, phosphorus, zinc, copper, nickel, magnesium, iron and other chemicals. One of these springs has a fountain up to 8 meters high. Some 4 million litres of water are released annually from hot springs. Most of this water flows into rivers.

According to Mirali Qashqai, Istisu is similar in chemical composition and physical properties to Karlovy Vary in Czech Republic, and in some respects it is unique in the world.

=== Soviet period ===
The resort was established under the Health Commissariat of the Azerbaijani SSR in 1925, after the Red Army invasion of Azerbaijan and the subsequent Sovietization of the country. It began to operate in 1927. In 1951, baths and a resort hospital and a hotel were built in Upper Istisu. In 1970, the Soviet government included the Istisu resort in the list of resorts that had all-union importance. During the Soviet period, 50 thousand people were treated here every year. In the 1980s, a water filling plant was built as part of the sanatorium. More than 800 thousand litres of mineral water were produced daily from the mineral water fields located here.

=== Occupation and return ===
The Kalbajar District of Azerbaijan was occupied by the Armenian forces after a large-scale attack launched by the Armenian forces on 27 March 1993. As a result of the battle, an estimated 60,000 Kurdish and Azerbaijani civilians were displaced, while more than 150 were taken hostage. Civilians fled Kalbajar in April through mountains still covered in snow. Refugees reported that hundreds of people froze to death attempting to flee. Azerbaijani sources reported that the region suffered $761 million in damage, while the resort itself received high damages. During the First Nagorno-Karabakh War, after the occupation of Kalbajar by Armenian forces in 1993, the resort was completely destroyed. The town subsequently became part of the self-proclaimed Republic of Artsakh as part of its Shahumyan Province, referred to as Jermajur (Armenian: Ջերմաջուր). In 2018, it was reported that work has begun on a privately funded factory to produce mineral water.

== Gallery ==
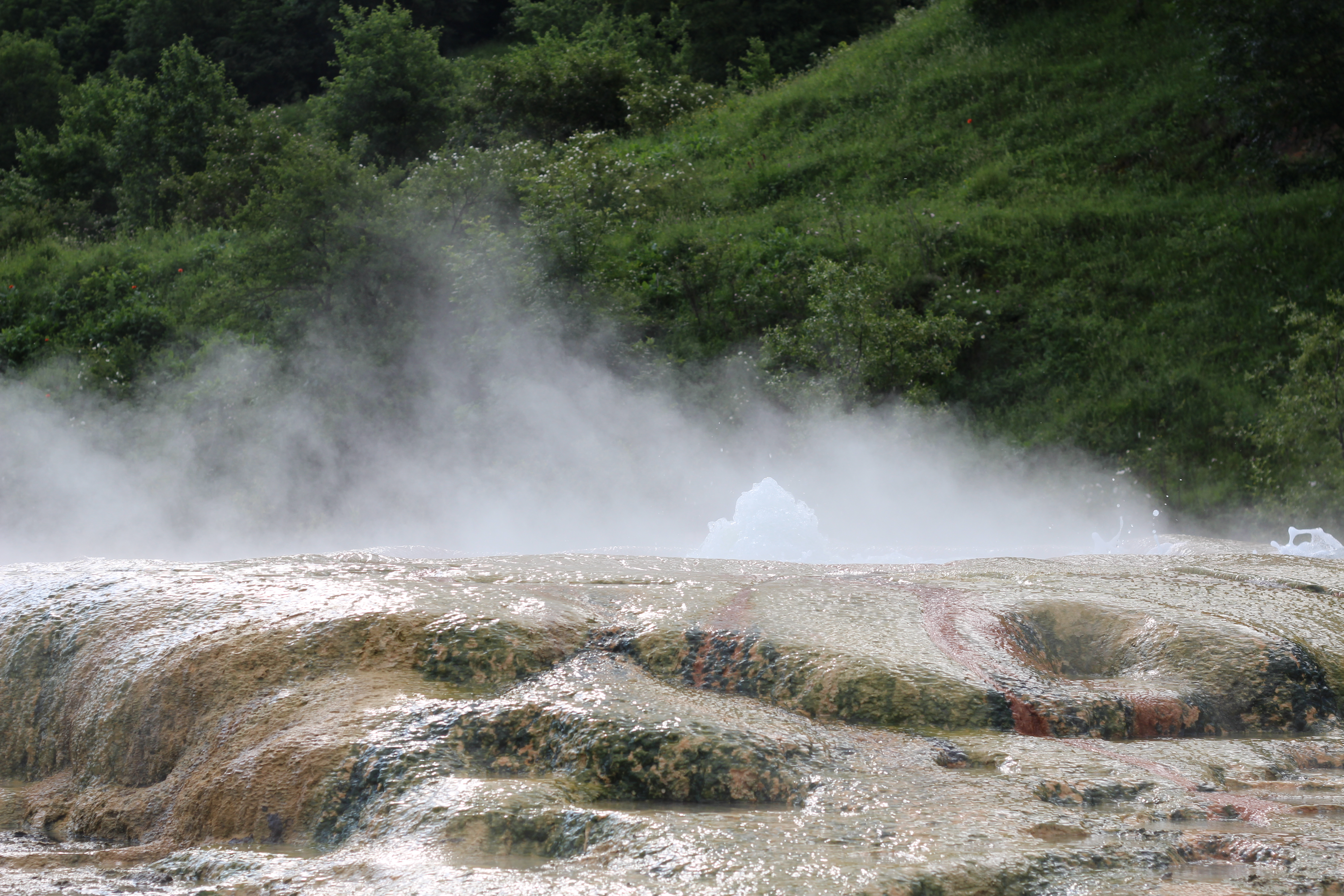

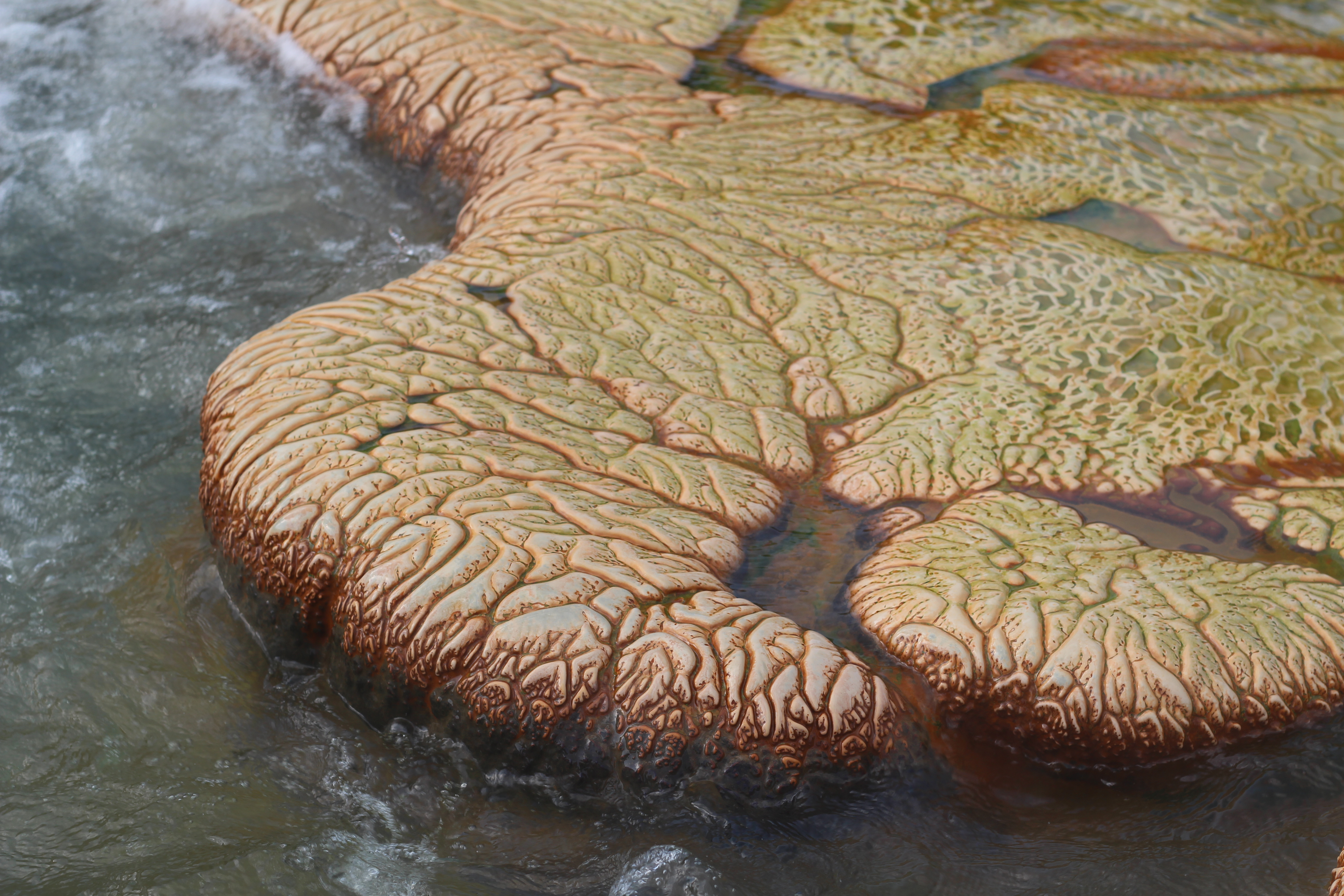

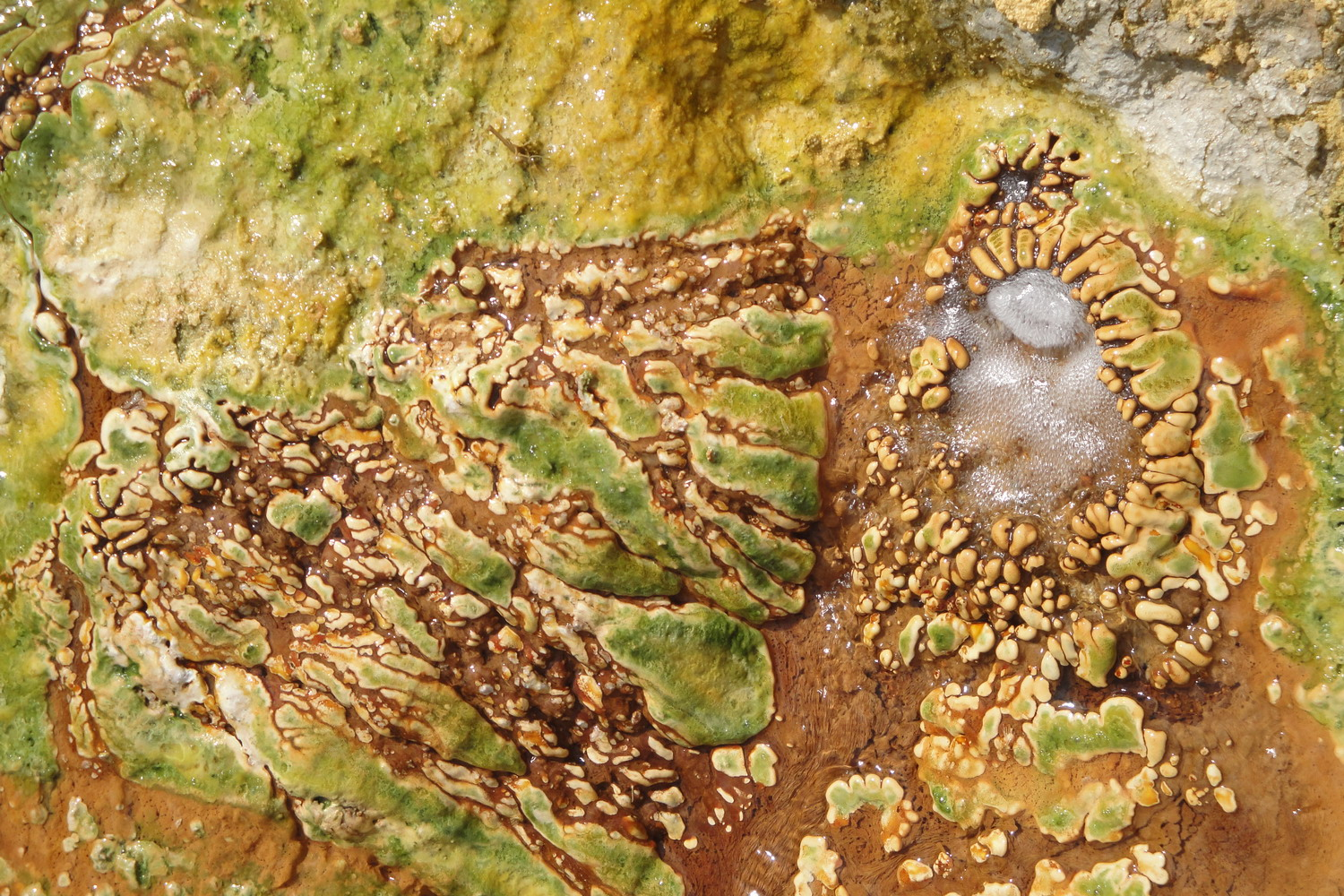

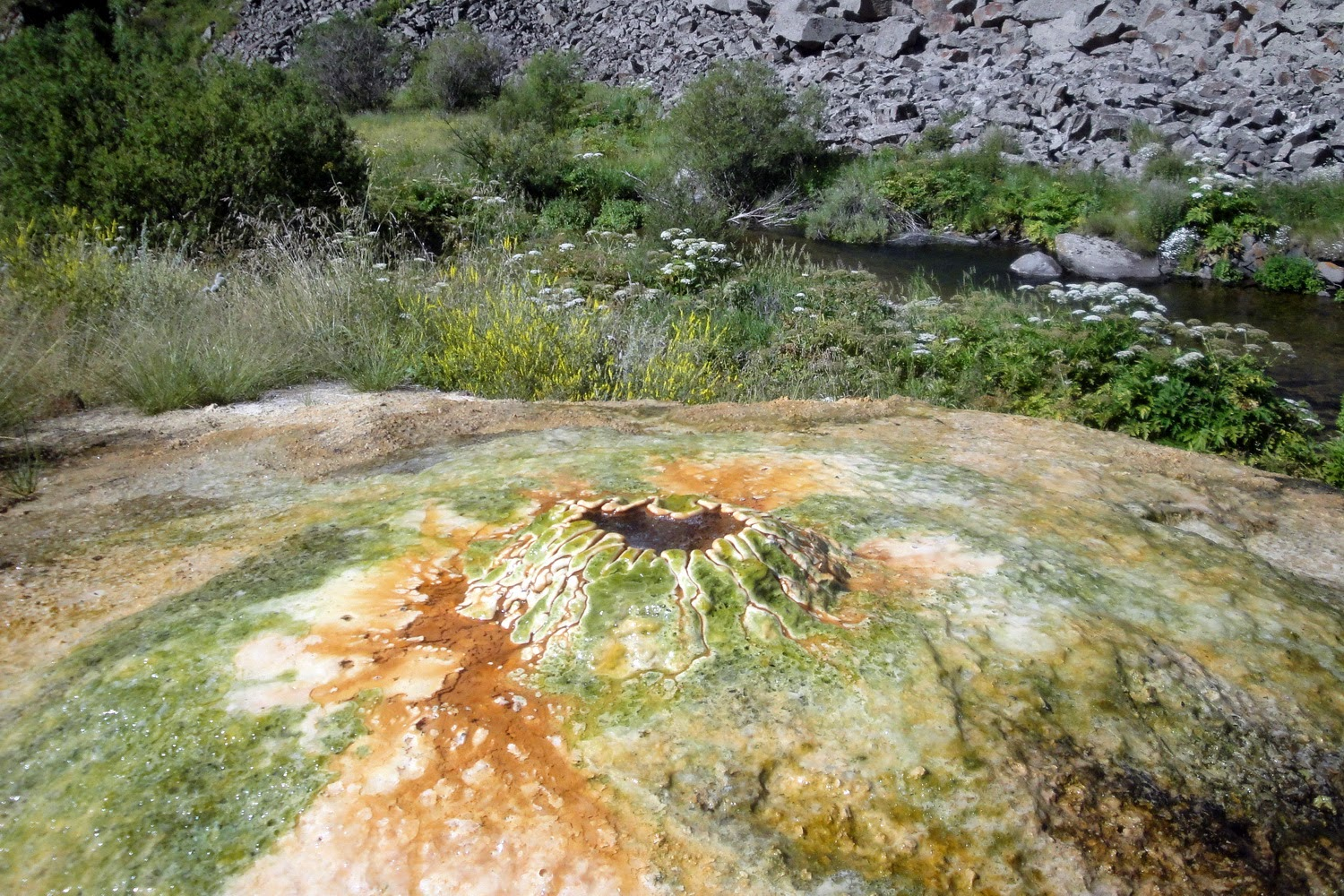

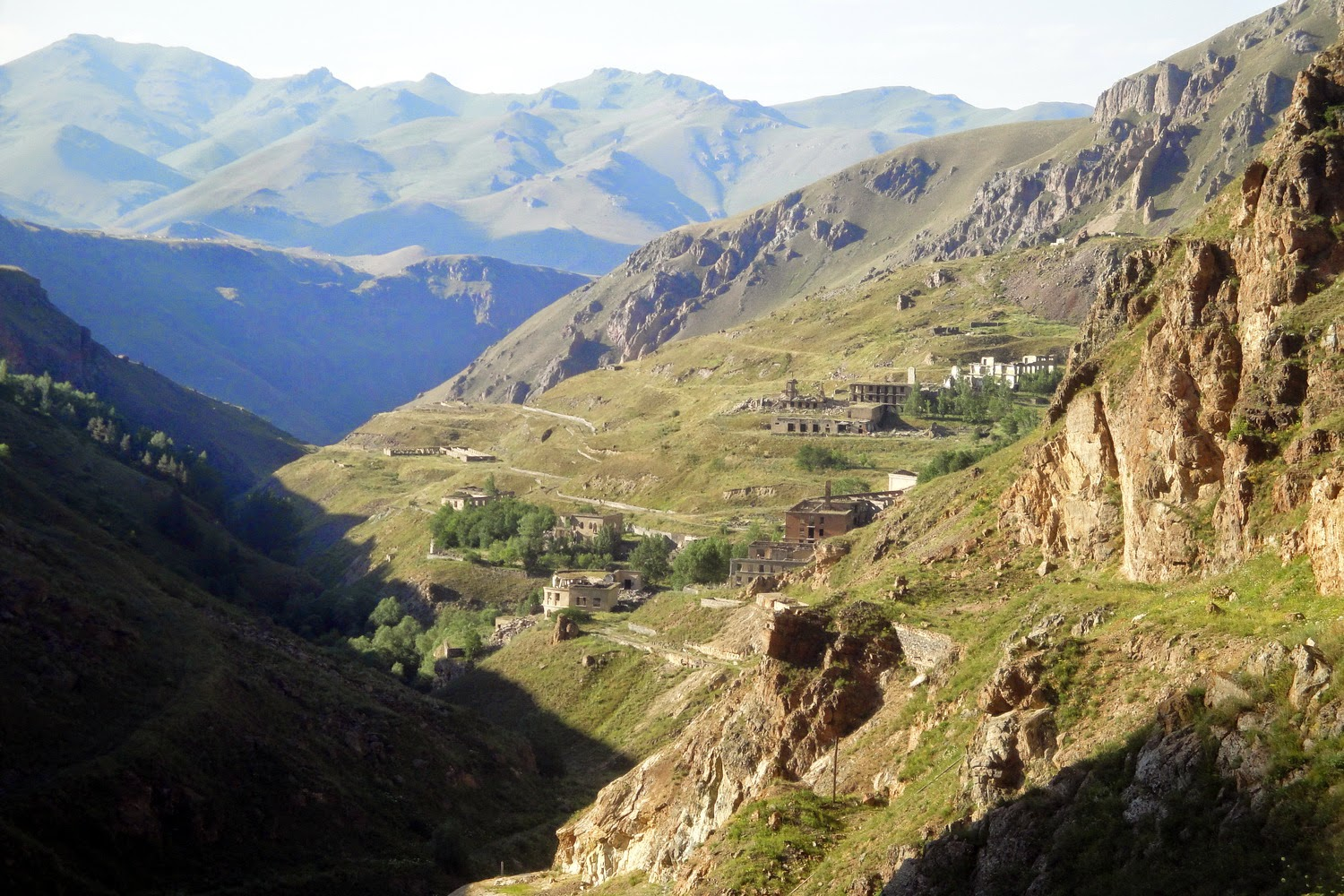

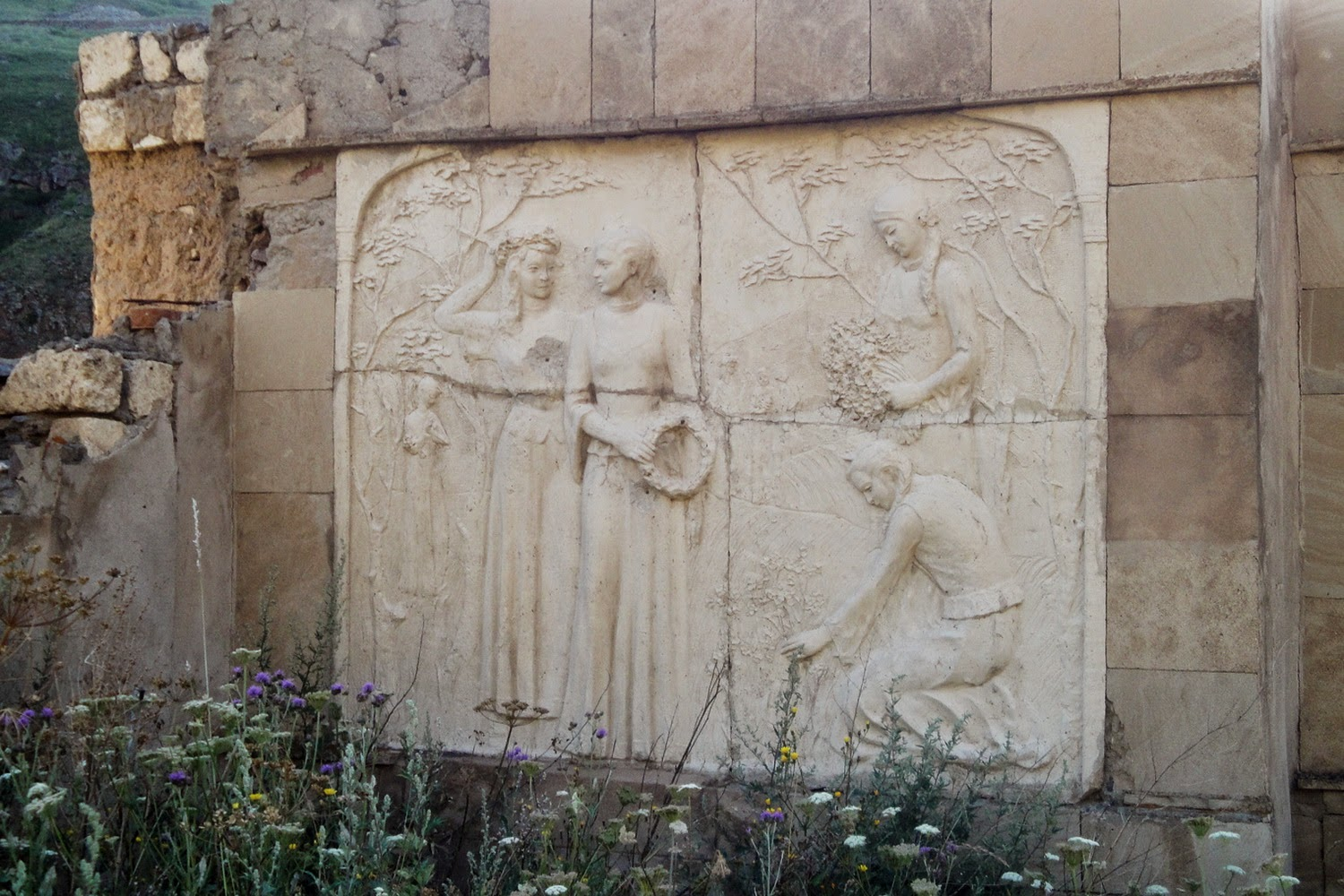

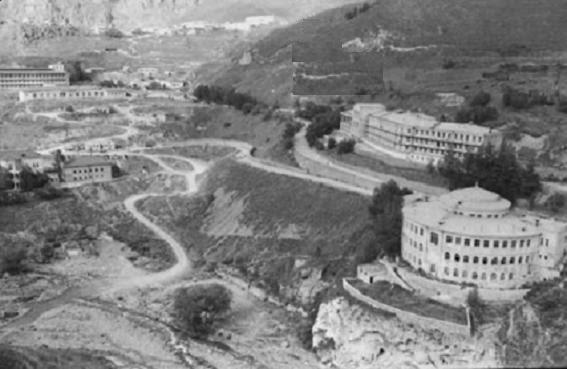
Old image of Istisu village, Kalbajar, Azerbaijan.
