= Simon Achikgyozyan =

Armenian military commander (1939–1991)

- Born: 6 February 1939; Galați, Kingdom of Romania
- Died: 30 April 1991 (aged 52); Martunashen, Azerbaijan SSR, USSR
- Burial place: Kanaker-Zeytun Cemetery, Yerevan
- Military career
- Allegiance: Armenian Revolutionary Federation
- Service years: 1989–1991
- Nicknames: Դեդ (Ded, "Grandfather")
- Unit: Arabo Detachment
- Conflicts: First Nagorno-Karabakh War: Operation Ring; Defence of Martunashen †
- Awards: Order of Combat Cross (1st Degree)

Simon Achikgyozyan (Armenian: Սիմոն Աչիկգյոզյան, 6 February 1939 – 30 April 1991) was one of the earliest Armenian military commanders during the First Nagorno-Karabakh War. He is considered a hero in Armenia.

== Early life, education and career ==
Achikgyozyan was born in the city of Galați, Kingdom of Romania to Hovhannes and Siranush from the Ottoman Empire, survivors of the Armenian genocide. In 1946, his family resettled in Soviet Armenia. Achikgyozyan graduated from the Yerevan State University in 1960 as an engineer-geologist. From 1961 to 1990, he worked at the Institute of Geological Sciences of the National Academy of Sciences of Armenia, earning a PhD in Geology in 1970. He is the author of over 70 scientific publications on geology and minerals of Armenia.

== First Nagorno-Karabakh War ==
The Karabakh movement that started in February 1988 demanded the unification of the mostly Armenian-population Nagorno-Karabakh Autonomous Oblast region of Soviet Azerbaijan with Armenia. The tensions between Armenians and Azerbaijanis soon escalated into an armed conflict known as the First Nagorno-Karabakh War.

Achikgyozyan joined the ARF-affiliated Arabo Detachment in 1989 and was elected into the Yerevan City Council in 1990. By early 1991, the tensions rose gradually to a point where an armed conflict became inevitable. In late April 1991, Soviet and Azerbaijani security forces jointly perpetrated Operation Ring, which included the deportation of thousands of civilian Armenians from the region. Armenian volunteer groups, led by Tatul Krpeyan (posthumously awarded with the title National Hero of Armenia) and Simon Achikgyozyan organized self-defense operations. However, their actions were suppressed by Soviet-Azerbaijani forces. On April 30, 1991, Achikgyozyan was killed in Martunashen village.
