= Tatul Krpeyan =

Armenian paramilitary commander (1965–1991)

National Hero of Armenia Tatul Krpeyan
- Born: April 21, 1965; Areg, Armenian SSR, Soviet Union
- Died: April 30, 1991 (aged 26); Getashen, Nagorno-Karabakh Autonomous Oblast, Soviet Union
- Military career
- Allegiance: Armenian Revolutionary Federation
- Service years: 1990–1991
- Nicknames: Գետաշենի արծիվ (Getasheni artsiv, "Eagle of Getashen")
- Conflicts: First Nagorno-Karabakh War; Operation Ring †
- Awards: National Hero of Armenia (1996)

Tatul Zhorzhiki Krpeyan (Armenian: Թաթուլ Ժորժիկի Կրպեյան; 21 April 1965 – 30 April 1991) was an Armenian commander. He was the self-appointed leader of paramilitary units in Getashen and Martunashen villages in Shahumyan District (Note: The Azerbaijani sections nowadays.) of Nagorno-Karabakh Autonomous Oblast during the First Nagorno-Karabakh War. He was killed during Operation Ring by the Soviet Azerbaijani special police (OMON).

== Biography ==
Born in the village of Areg near the town of Talin, Armenia, he completed his elementary and intermediary education in the Technical School of Talin. After serving in the Soviet Army, in 1987 he entered the Faculty of History of Yerevan State University. During his first year at university, Tatul joined the Karabakh movement. He was also a member of the "Miatsum" (Unification) organization, whose efforts were directed to unite the Nagorno-Karabakh Autonomous Oblast with Armenia.

=== Operation Ring ===
In September 1990, he traveled to Nagorno-Karabakh, where the situation continued to deteriorate. Joining the Armenian Revolutionary Federation (ARF), Tatul founded the "Dashnaktsakanner" unit of volunteers in Karabakh.

Krpeyan headed the self-defense of the sub-district Getashen-Martunashen from September 1990 until late April 1991 against Azerbaijani Armed Forces units and police detachments (OMON). In the spring of 1991 the main battleground of the partisan war was the wooded hills to the north of Nagorno-Karabakh where fighters from Armenia infiltrated to Armenian inhabited villages. Tatul Krpeyan led his volunteers to Getashen and Martunashen. On 10 April 1991 the decision was made by the authorities to start operations against these villages.

Krpeyan was killed on 30 April 1991 in Getashen during Operation Ring. The Moscow-based human rights group Memorial has reconstructed what happened. On 30 April 1991, 4th Army soldiers and then the Azerbaijani OMON entered Getashen near Shahumian, where Krpeyan was killed․ The OMON raided and looted houses and attacked many of the inhabitants. The dozen or so killed were in their eighties and nineties. The OMON forces took fifty hostages, half of whom were exchanged for soldiers taken hostage by Tatul's men. The volunteer fighters retreated and the Armenian villagers of Getashen and Martunashen were deported.

Fellow ARF volunteer fighter Harmik Hovsepyan described Krpeyan thus:

I remember Tatul well. He was like a ‘fedayi’ (freedom fighter) from Sasoun - broad-shouldered, with curly hair and a thick moustache. Not only did he serve as head of the detachment but he also taught in the local school there. The role he played wasn't limited to just fighting…

== Legacy ==
Krpeyan was buried in his native village Areg, which was renamed Tatul after him. A monument made of tuff sculpted by Tariel Hakobyan was raised in his memory on his grave. He posthumously received the highest title in Armenia, the National Hero of Armenia award in 1996․ Many works of art have been dedicated to Krpeyan. In 2004 Rafayel Sahakian published a historical fiction book named Artsvapasht Yerkir (Eagle-worshipping Country) dedicated to him. The song "Leran Lanjin" ("On the Mountain Slope"), composed by Nersik Ispiryan, mentions Krpeyan. "Mayramut Ijav" ("The Sun Set") was composed by Ashugh Gevorg, as well as Ashot Babayan's sonata for cello and piano in 1993, were all reportedly dedicated to Tatul Krpeyan's memory.

In 2015, on his 50th birth anniversary, a school and a park in Yerevan were renamed in his honour per governmental jubilee commissions. A commemorative stamp depicting Krpeyan were issued by Haypost meanwhile for this national celebration.
