= Monte Melkonian =

Armenian revolutionary hero (1957–1993)

National Hero of Armenia Monte Melkonian
- Մոնթէ Մելքոնեան
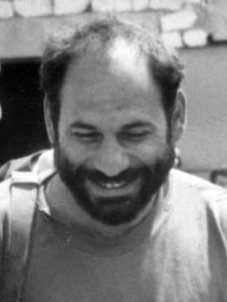
- Born: 25 November 1957; Visalia, California, United States
- Died: 12 June 1993 (aged 35); Mərzili, Aghdam, Azerbaijan
- Burial place: Yerablur, Armenia
- Alma mater: University of California, Berkeley
- Spouse: Seta Kabranian (m. 1991–1993)
- Relatives: Markar Melkonian (brother)
- Military career
- Allegiance: ASALA (1980–1988); Artsakh (1988–1993)
- Service years: 1978–1993
- Nickname: Avo (Աւօ)
- Conflicts: Iranian Revolution; Black Friday (protester); Lebanese Civil War; 1982 Lebanon War; Nagorno-Karabakh conflict; First Nagorno-Karabakh War; Mardakert and Martuni Offensives; Battle of Kalbajar; Battle of Aghdam †
- Awards: National Hero of Armenia (1996)
- Other work: The Right to Struggle: Selected Writings of Monte Melkonian on the Armenian National Question (1993) (Note: Published posthumously. Compiled from selected works written by Melkonian between 1981 and 1991.)

Monte Melkonian (Armenian: Մոնթէ Մելքոնեան; (Note: Reformed Armenian orthography: Մոնթե Մելքոնյան) 25 November 1957 – 12 June 1993) was an Armenian-American revolutionary and left-wing nationalist militant. He was a commander in the Artsakh Defense Army and National Hero of Armenia.

Born in California, Melkonian left the United States and arrived in Iran as a teacher in 1978, amidst the Iranian Revolution. He took part in demonstrations against Mohammed Reza Pahlavi, and subsequently travelled to Lebanon to serve with a Beirut-based Armenian militia fighting in the Lebanese Civil War. Melkonian was active in Bourj Hammoud, and was one of the planners of the Turkish consulate attack in Paris in 1981. He was later arrested and imprisoned in France. He was released in 1989 and acquired a visa to travel to Armenia in 1990.

Prior to the First Nagorno-Karabakh War, during which he commanded an estimated 4,000 Armenian troops, Melkonian had no official service record in any country's armed forces. Instead, his military experience came from his activity in ASALA during the Lebanese Civil War. With ASALA, Melkonian fought against various right-wing Lebanese militias in and around Beirut, and had also taken part in combat against Israel during the 1982 Lebanon War.

Over the course of his military career, Melkonian had adopted a number of aliases, including "Abu Sindi," "Timothy Sean McCormack," and "Saro." During the First Nagorno-Karabakh War, many of the Armenian soldiers under his command referred to him as Avo (Աւօ). On 12 June 1993, Melkonian was killed by Azerbaijani soldiers while he was surveying the village of Mərzili with five other Armenian soldiers after a battle. He was buried at Yerablur, a military cemetery in the capital city of Armenia Yerevan, and was posthumously conferred the title of National Hero of Armenia in 1996.

== Early life ==
=== Youth ===
Melkonian was born on 25 November 1957, at Visalia Municipal Hospital in Visalia, California, to Charles (1918−2006) and Zabel Melkonian (1920−2012). He was the third of four children born to a self-employed cabinet maker and an elementary-school teacher. By all accounts, Melkonian was described as an all-American child who joined the Boy Scouts and was a pitcher in Little League baseball. He also played the clarinet. Melkonian's parents rarely talked about their Armenian heritage with their children, often referring to the place of their ancestors as the "Old Country". According to his interest in his background only sparked at the age of eleven, when his family went on a year-long trip to Europe in 1969. In the spring of that year, the family also travelled across Turkey to visit the town of Merzifon, where Melkonian's maternal grandparents were from. Merzifon's population at the time was 23,475 but was almost completely devoid of its once 17,000-strong Armenian population that was wiped out during the Armenian genocide in 1915. This trip apparently also deeply moved Melkonian. During his final year at university, the Armenian Student Association was established, providing him with opportunities to engage with Armenian circles, participate in organized activities, and learn about other political movements through student associations.

=== Education ===
Upon his return to California, Melkonian returned to attend high school. He excelled in his courses and participated in a study abroad program in East Asia, visiting Vietnam and Japan, where he learned local customs and picked up on some of the language. After his stint abroad, he returned to the US and enrolled at the University of California, Berkeley with a Regents Scholarship, majoring in ancient Asian history and Archaeology. He finished his degree in under three years, and was accepted to the archaeology graduate program at the University of Oxford. He decided against this, however, and chose to travel abroad again, this time to the Middle East.

== Departure from the United States ==
=== Iranian Revolution ===
After graduating from U.C. Berkeley in the spring of 1978, Melkonian travelled to Iran, where he taught English and participated in the movement to overthrow the Shah. He helped organize a teachers' strike at his school in Tehran, and was in the vicinity of Jaleh Square when the Shah's troops opened fire on protesters, killing and injuring many. Later, he found his way to Iranian Kurdistan, where Kurdish partisans made a deep impression on him. Years later, in southern Lebanon, he occasionally wore the uniform of the Kurdish peshmerga which he was given in Iranian Kurdistan.

=== Lebanese Civil War ===
In the fall of 1978, Melkonian made his way to Beirut, the capital of Lebanon, in time to participate in the defense of the Armenian quarter against the right-wing Phalange forces. While he was living in East Beirut, Melkonian worked underground with individual members of the Social Democrat Hunchakian Party and the Lebanese Communist Party. Although he never professed an allegiance to the Armenian Revolutionary Federation (ARF), he was a member of the Armenian militia that defended positions in and around Bourj Hammoud that were under the command of ARF "group leaders". Melkonian was a permanent member of the militia's bases in Bourj Hammoud, Western Beirut, Antelias, Eastern Beirut, and other regions for almost two years, during which time he participated in several street battles against Phalange forces. He also began working behind the lines in Phalangist controlled territory, on behalf of the "Leftist and Arab" Lebanese National Movement. By this time, he was speaking Armenian – a language he had not learned until adulthood (Armenian was the fourth or fifth language Melkonian learned to speak fluently, after Spanish, French, and Japanese. In addition, he spoke passable Arabic, Italian, and Turkish, as well as some Persian and Kurdish).

==== ASALA ====
In the spring of 1980, Melkonian was inducted into the Armenian Secret Army for the Liberation of Armenia (ASALA) and secretly relocated to West Beirut. For the next three years he was an ASALA militant and contributor to the group's journal, Hayastan. During this time, several Palestinian militant organizations provided their Armenian comrades with extensive military training. On 31 July 1980 in Athens, Melkonian assassinated the Administrative Attaché of Turkish Embassy in Greece, Galip Ozmen, considered by Melkonian to be a legitimate target for representing a regime that committed the Armenian genocide, occupied northern Cyprus, massacred Kurds in Turkey, among other crimes. After his death, Özmen was also revealed to have been a Turkish intelligence (MIT) spy. Melkonian also shot the passengers in the front and back seats who were obscured by darkly tinted window glass, believing them to be other diplomats. The passengers were later revealed to be Ozmen's wife Sevil, and his sixteen-year-old son, Kaan, who were wounded but survived, and his fourteen-year-old daughter, Neslihan, who later died of her wounds. Melkonian was reportedly unhappy to find out who the other passengers were, and later wrote that he would've spared them if he had a clearer view.

Melkonian carried out armed operations in Rome, Athens and elsewhere, and he helped to plan and train commandos for the "Van Operation" of September 24, 1981, in which four ASALA militants took over the Turkish embassy in Paris and held it for several days. In November 1981, French police arrested and imprisoned a young, suspected criminal carrying a Cypriot passport bearing the name "Dimitri Georgiu". Following the detonation of several bombs in Paris aimed at gaining his release, "Georgiu" was returned to Lebanon where he revealed his identity as Monte Melkonian.

In mid-July 1983, ASALA violently split into two factions, one opposed to the group's despotic leader, whose nom de guerre was Hagop Hagopian, and another supporting him. Although the lines of fissure had been deepening over the course of several years, the shooting of Hagopian's two closest aides at a military camp in Lebanon finally led to the open breach. This impetuous action was perpetrated by one individual who was not closely affiliated with Melkonian. As a result of this action, however, Hagopian took revenge by personally torturing and executing two of Melkonian's dearest comrades, Garlen Ananian and Aram Vartanian.

=== Imprisonment in France ===
In the aftermath of this split, Melkonian spent over two years underground, first in Lebanon and later in France. After testifying secretly for the defence in the trial of Armenian militant and accused bank robber Levon Minassian, he was arrested in Paris in November 1985 and sentenced to six years in prison for possession of falsified papers and carrying an illegal handgun.

Melkonian spent over three years in Fresnes and Poissy prisons. He was released in early 1989 and sent from France to South Yemen, where he was reunited with his girlfriend Seta. Together they spent year and a half living underground in various countries of eastern Europe in relative poverty, as one Eastern Bloc regime after another disintegrated.

== Arrival in the Armenian SSR ==
=== Dissolution of the Soviet Union ===
On 6 October 1990, Melkonian arrived in what was then still the Armenian Soviet Socialist Republic. During his first 8 months in Armenia, Melkonian worked in the Armenian Academy of Sciences, where he prepared an archaeological research monograph on Urartian cave tombs, which was posthumously published in 1995.

Finding himself on Armenian soil after many years, he wrote in a letter that he found a lot of confusion among his compatriots. Armenia faced enormous economic, political and environmental problems at every turn, problems that had festered for decades. New political forces bent on dismantling the Soviet Union were taking Armenia in a direction that Melkonian believed was bound to exacerbate the crisis and produce more problems. He believed that "a national blunder was taking place right before his eyes."

=== Armenia and Azerbaijan ===
Under these circumstances, it quickly became clear to Melkonian that, for better or for worse, the Soviet Union had no future and the coming years would be perilous ones for the Armenian people. He then focused his energy on Nagorno-Karabakh. "If we lose [Karabakh]," the bulletin of the Nagorno-Karabakh Defense Forces quoted him as saying, "we turn the final page of our people's history." He believed that, if Azeri forces succeeded in deporting Armenians from Karabakh, they would advance on Zangezur and other regions of Armenia.

==== Nagorno-Karabakh conflict ====
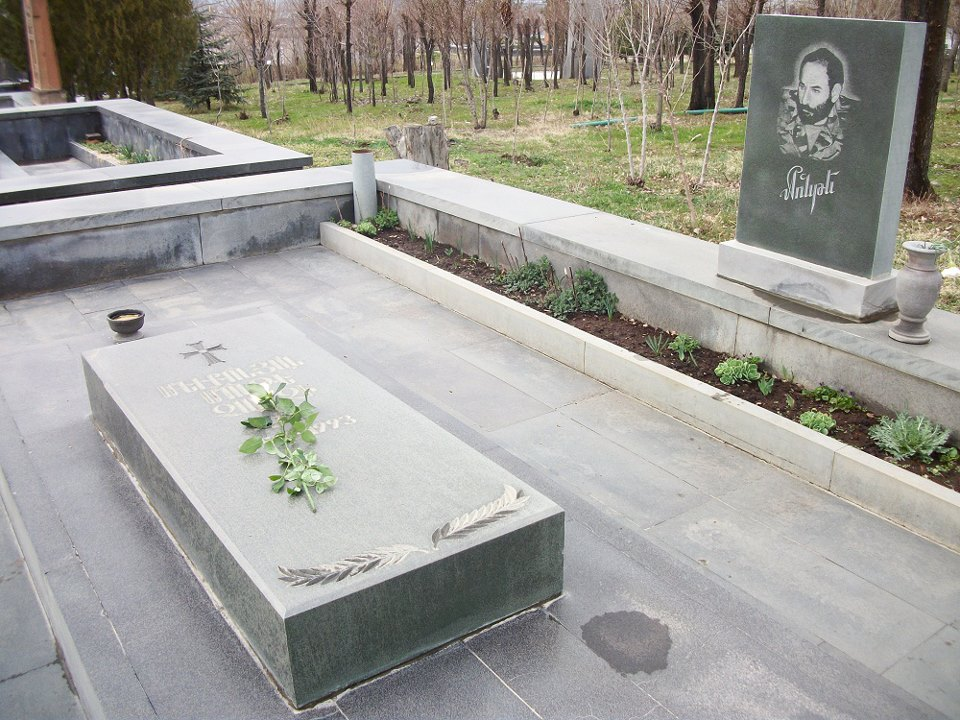
Melkonian's tomb at Yerablur military cemetery

On 12 or 14 September 1991, Melkonian travelled to the Shahumian region (north of Karabakh), where he fought for three months in the fall of 1991. There he participated in the capture of the villages of Erkej, Manashid and Buzlukh.

On February 4, 1992, Melkonian arrived in Martuni as the regional commander. Upon his arrival the changes were immediately felt: civilians started feeling more secure and at peace as Azeri armies were pushed back and were finding it increasingly difficult to shell Martuni's residential areas with GRAD missiles.

In April 1993, Melkonian was one of the chief military strategists who planned and led the operation to fight Azeri fighters and capture the region of Kalbajar of Azerbaijan which lies between Armenia and the former NKAO. Armenian forces captured the region in four days of heavy fighting, sustaining far fewer fatalities than the enemy.

== Death and legacy ==
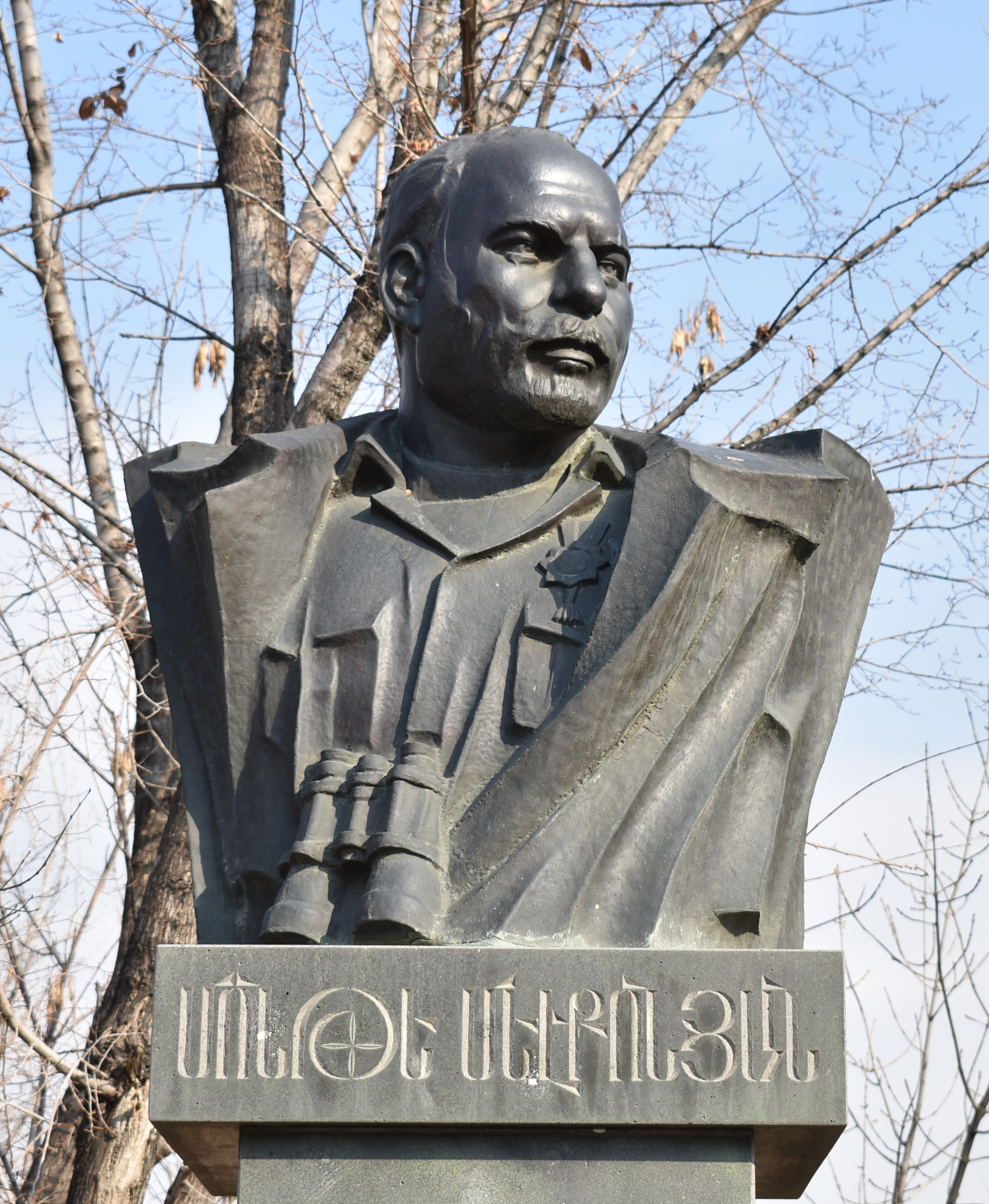
Melkonian's bust at the Victory Park, Yerevan.

Melkonian was killed in the abandoned village of Merzili in the early afternoon of 12 June 1993 during the Battle of Aghdam. According to Markar Melkonian, Melkonian's older brother and author of his biography, Melkonian died in the waning hours of the evening by enemy fire during an unexpected skirmish that broke out with several Azerbaijani soldiers who had likely gotten lost.

Melkonian was buried with full military honors on 19 June 1993, at Yerablur military cemetery in the outskirts of Yerevan, where his coffin was brought from the Surb Zoravar Church in the city centre. Some 50,000 to 100,000 people (some reports put the figure as high as 250,000), including Armenian President Levon Ter-Petrosyan, acting Defense Minister Vazgen Manukyan, Deputy Foreign Minister Gerard Libaridian, other officials, and parliamentarians attended his funeral.

The Karabakh town of Martuni was tentatively renamed Monteaberd Armenian: Մոնթեաբերդ; literally "Fort Monte") in his honor. A statue of Melkonian was present in the town throughout the Republic of Artsakh era, but both Armenian and Azeri media reported on its removal after the 2023 Azeri takeover, with Azeri media such as Turan and Trend claiming it was removed by the Armenians to prevent the Azeris from doing so.

In 1993, the Monte Melkonian Military Academy was established in Yerevan.

Statues of Melkonian have been erected in Yerevan's Victory Park, and in the towns of Dilijan (2017) and Vardenis (2021). In 2021, the village of Shahumyani Trchnafabrika was renamed Monteavan after him.

=== Public image ===
Melkonian had become a legend in Armenia and Karabakh by the time of his death. Due to his international socialist and Armenian nationalist views, one author described him as a mix between the early 20th century Armenian military commander Andranik and Marxist revolutionary Che Guevara. Thomas de Waal described him as a "professional warrior and an extreme Armenian nationalist" who is "the most celebrated Armenian commander" of the Nagorno-Karabakh War. Raymond Bonner wrote in 1993 that Melkonian had charisma and discipline, which is why he "rapidly became the most highly regarded commander in the Karabakh War." Razmik Panossian wrote that Melkonian was "a charismatic and very capable commander."

== Political and moral views ==
Melkonian was an Armenian nationalist and a revolutionary socialist. Throughout his life he sympathized with Marxism–Leninism, which was also the ideology of ASALA. Vorbach wrote in 1994 that his writings "expose him as an Armenian nationalist and a committed socialist of the Marxist-Leninist variety." According to his brother he "had not always been a communist, but he had never been an ex-communist." Melkonian hoped that the Soviet Union would "reform itself, democratise, and promote personal freedoms" and did not abandon hope in Soviet Armenia until the end of the Soviet era appeared inevitable. Philip Marsden wrote that his career "reveals the profound shift in radical ideology—from revolutionary Marxism to nationalism." Marsden adds that in the 1980s his ideology came into conflict with a growing nationalism: "With ever greater difficulty, he squeezed the Armenian question into the context of left-wing orthodoxy, believing for instance that Armenia's independence from the Soviet Union would be a terrible error." In the 1980s he advocated for the Soviet takeover of Turkey's formerly Armenian populated areas and its unification with Soviet Armenia. Yet he likewise supported the idea that "the most direct way... to attain the right to live in 'Western Armenia' is by participating in the revolutionary struggle in Turkey" and considered the option of Armenian self-determination within a revolutionary Turkish or Kurdish state. In the 1980s, while in a French prison, he called for the creation of a guerrilla force in eastern Turkey which would unite Kurdish rebels, left-wing Turks, and Armenian revolutionaries. Vorbach summarized his views on Turkey:

He was a revolutionary personality motivated by the vision of an overthrow of the 'chauvinist' leadership in Turkey and the establishment of a revolutionary socialist government (be it Turkish, Kurdish, Armenian or Soviet Armenian) under which Armenians could live freely in their historic homeland, which includes areas in present day Turkey.

While in Poissy prison, Melkonian drafted a political manifesto for his envisioned "Armenian Patriotic Liberation Movement", in which he outlines seven core principles: 1) revolutionary internationalism, 2) democracy and self-determination, 3) socialism, 4) feminism, 5) environmentalism, 6) anti-imperialism, and 7) peace and disarmament.

By the early 1990s, he saw Karabakh as a "sacred cause". He is quoted as saying, "If we lose Karabakh, we turn the final page of our people's history." He was quoted by The Moscow Times in 1993: "There's bound to be a coup d'etat in Turkey sometime in the next 10 years. During the immediate post-coup chaos, we'll take Nakhichevan - easy!"

Melkonian was also an internationalist. In an article titled "Imperialism in the New World Order" he declared his support for socialist movements in Palestine, South Africa, Central America and elsewhere. He also espoused environmentalism from an anti-capitalist perspective. According to one author his economic views were influenced by the Beirut-based Armenian Marxist economist Alexander Yenikomshian.

Maile Melkonian, Melkonian's sister, wrote in 1997 that he was never associated with and was not a supporter of the views of the Armenian Revolutionary Federation (Dashnaks).

=== Anti-smoking and anti-alcohol stance ===
Melkonian was said to have led an exemplary life by not smoking and drinking. Melkonian advocated that revolutionary socialists must lead "practical self-disciplined lives" and avoid "self-destructive habits" such as smoking or drinking alcohol: "By severely diminishing a person's self-discipline, these dependencies inhibit a person from becoming a member of the vanguard, and especially a guerrilla or fedaii." When he joined in toasts, he is said to have raised a glass of yogurt. Melkonian is widely known to have forbidden his soldiers consumption of alcohol. He also established a policy of collecting a tax in kind on Martuni wine, in the form of diesel and ammunition for his fighters. Melkonian also burned cultivated fields of cannabis in Karabakh.

== Personal life ==
Melkonian married his long-time girlfriend Seta Kebranian at the Geghard monastery in Armenia in August 1991. They had met in the late 1970s in Lebanon. In a 1993 interview, Melkonian said that they had had no time to start a family. He stated, "We'll settle down when the Armenian people's struggle is over."

As of 2013 Seta, an activist and a lecturer, resided in Anchorage, Alaska with her husband Joel Condon who is a professor of architecture at the University of Alaska Anchorage.

== Awards ==
Country	Award	Date
Nagorno-Karabakh	Order of the Combat Cross of the First Degree	23 November 1993
Armenia	National Hero of Armenia	20 September 1996
Nagorno-Karabakh	Hero of Artsakh	21 September 1999

== Bibliography ==
- de Waal, Thomas (2003). Black Garden: Armenia and Azerbaijan Through Peace and War. New York: New York University Press.
- de Waal, Thomas (2013). Black Garden: Armenia and Azerbaijan Through Peace and War (2nd (revised and updated) ed.). NYU Press.
- Melkonian, Markar (2005). My Brother's Road, An American's Fateful Journey to Armenia. New York: I.B. Tauris.
- Melkonian, Monte (1990). The Right to Struggle: Selected Writings of Monte Melkonian on the Armenian National Question. San Francisco: Sardarabad Collective
- Krikorian, Michael (2007). ""Excuse me, how do I get to the front?" The Brothers Monte and Markar Melkonian (Los Angeles)". In von Voss, Huberta (ed.). Portraits of Hope: Armenians in the Contemporary World. Berghahn Books. pp. 237–242. ISBN 978-1-84545-257-5.
- Vorbach, Joseph E. (1994). "Monte Melkonian: Armenian revolutionary leader". Terrorism and Political Violence. 6 (2): 178–195. doi:10.1080/09546559408427253.
- Zurcher, Christopher (2009). The Post-Soviet Wars: Rebellion, Ethnic Conflict, and Nationhood in the Caucasus. NYU Press. ISBN 978-0-81479-724-2.
