= My Brother's Road =

Book by Markar Melkonian

My Brother's Road: An American's Fateful Journey to Armenia
- Author: Markar Melkonian
- Language: English
- Subject: History
- Publisher: I. B. Tauris
- Publication date: 2005
- Publication place: United States
- Pages: 344 pp
- ISBN: 1-85043-635-5

My Brother's Road: An American's Fateful Journey to Armenia by Markar Melkonian. It is a biography and memoir about the American-born Armenian, Monte Melkonian (1957–1993) published by Bloomsbury in May 2008.

Monte was a third-generation Central Californian who as a young man abandoned a promising career as an archaeologist to become an Armenian militant. He was a witness to revolution in Iran, an Armenian militiaman in Beirut, a guerrilla fighter in Southern Lebanon, and finally, a commander of 4,000 fighters and thirty tanks in Karabagh. He died in battle on June 12, 1993, and has since been designated a national hero of Armenia.

The book was written with the help of Monte's widow, Seta, and covers his journey from the classrooms of California to the rubble of Beirut, the Iranian revolution, ASALA, and the struggle for the mountains of Nagorno-Karabakh.
