= Hayastan (periodical) =

Hayastan meaning Armenia (in Armenian: Հայաստան, pronounced Hayasdan in Western Armenian) was a multilingual radical publication and the organ of the Armenian Secret Army for the Liberation of Armenia (ASALA). The journal published editorials, official announcements and communiques of ASALA, and articles on political and military issues. The periodical was primarily in Armenian but also contained articles and translations of Armenian-language articles in a number of other languages, notably in Arabic, English, French and Turkish.

Established in October 1980 in Lebanon, it published monthly during the periods 1980-1987 and 1991–1997. It was a free publication and was distributed clandestinely. From 1983 to 1987 it issued separate additional issues in Arabic, English, French and Turkish.

== Other supporting periodicals ==
Affiliated publications including Hayasdan Gaydzer published in London and Hayasdan - Hay Baykar published in Paris used the title "Hayastan" in their titles and used wide excerpts of the contents of Hayastan in their publications.

However these publications were not considered as official organs of ASALA but rather those of the Armenian Popular Movements which worked as sympathizers and at times as political wing of the organization or mobilizing support for them.
