= Çaykənd, Goygol =

Çaykənd Գետաշեն • Getashen
- Municipality
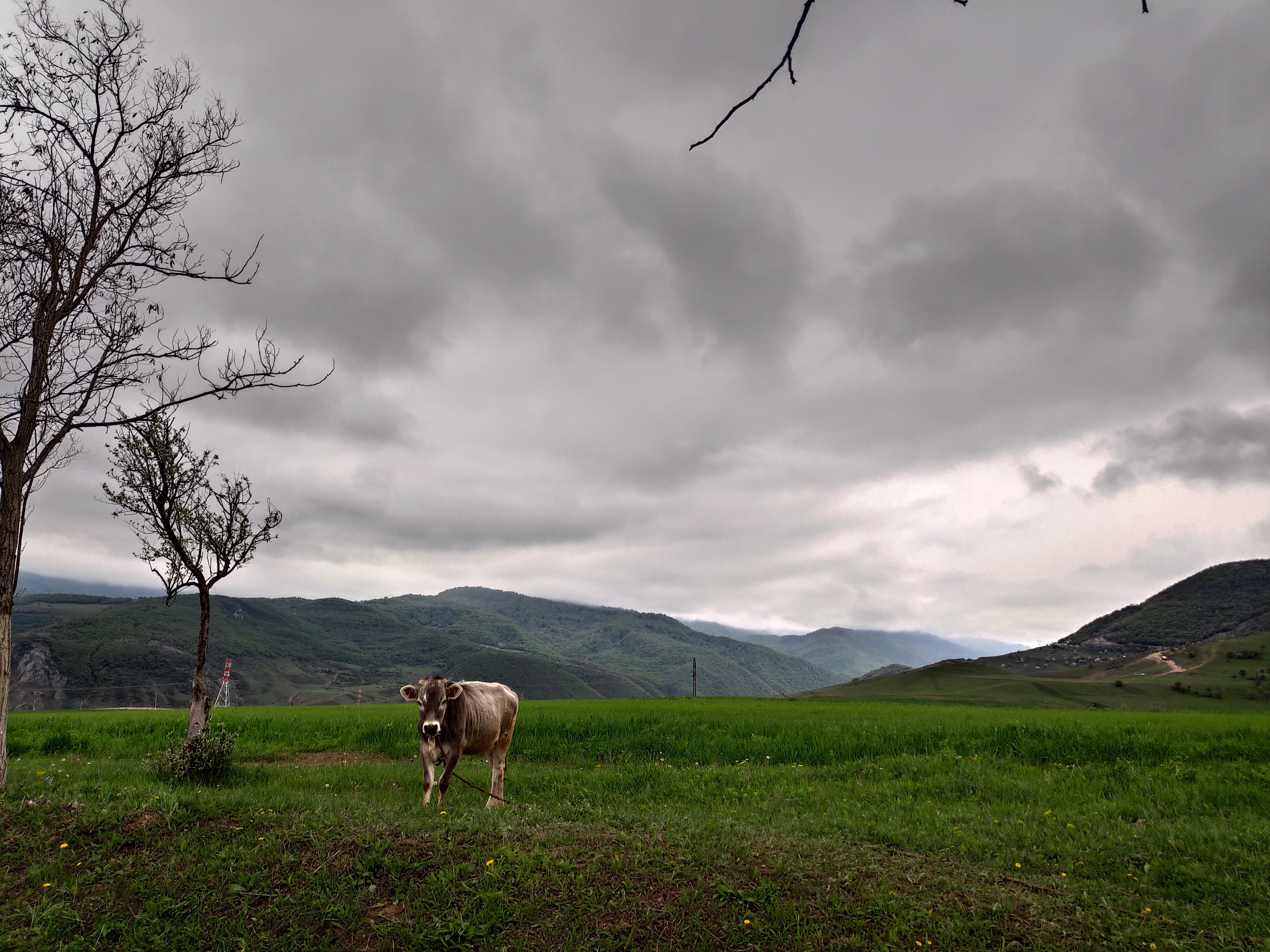

- Location within Azerbaijan
- Coordinates: 40°28′21.4″N 46°22′12.6″E
- Country: Azerbaijan
- District: Goygol

Population
  - Total: 2,236
- Time zone: UTC+4 (AZT)

Çaykənd (Chaykend; Armenian: Գետաշեն, romanized: Getashen) is a village and municipality in the Goygol District of Azerbaijan.

== History ==
Soviet forces acting in conjunction with the local Azerbaijani OMON deported Armenians living in the areas in and around Karabakh including Getashen. The operation involved the use of ground troops, military, armored vehicles and artillery. The deportations of the Armenian civilians were carried out with gross human rights violations documented by international human rights organizations.

== Demographics ==
The village has a population of 2,236. It had an Armenian majority prior to the First Nagorno-Karabakh War and Operation Ring. However, the Armenian population of the village was deported by Azerbaijani and Soviet special forces during Operation Ring in 1991.
