= Markar Melkonian =

Armenian-American writer

- Born: Visalia, CA, U.S.
- Education: Ph.D. in Philosophy, University of Massachusetts–Amherst

Markar Melkonian is an Armenian-American writer, lecturer, and solidarity worker.

Melkonian's book My Brother's Road: An American's Fateful Journey to Armenia, details the life of his brother, Monte Melkonian, and his role in the struggle for Armenian independence in the 1990s. My Brother's Road was published by I.B. Tauris in 2005 (revised paperback 2008). Translations in Italian, Armenian, Russian, and French were planned. His book The Wrong Train: Notes on Armenia since the Counterrevolution (2020) presents contextual analysis of the challenges plaguing Armenia as it shifts from a post-Soviet economy to a fiercely capitalist one.

== Books ==
Markar Melkonian's books include

- Melkonian, Markar (1996). Marxism: A Post-Cold War Primer. Boulder: Westview Press. ISBN 978-0-7567-6371-8.
- Melkonian, Markar (1999). Richard Rorty's Politics: Liberalism at the End of the American Century. Amherst, N.Y.: Humanity Books. ISBN 978-1-57392-725-3. OCLC 41649687.
- Melkonian, Markar (2005). My Brother's Road: An American's Fateful Journey to Armenia. Gpranyan-Melkʻonyan, Seda. London: I.B. Tauris. ISBN 978-1-85043-635-5. OCLC 56805609.
- Melkonian, Markar (2020). The Wrong Train: Notes on Armenia since the Counterrevolution. I.B. Tauris. ISBN 978-1-949618-22-8.
