= Operation Kalbajar =

First Nagorno-Karabakh War military offensive

- Part of First Nagorno-Karabakh War
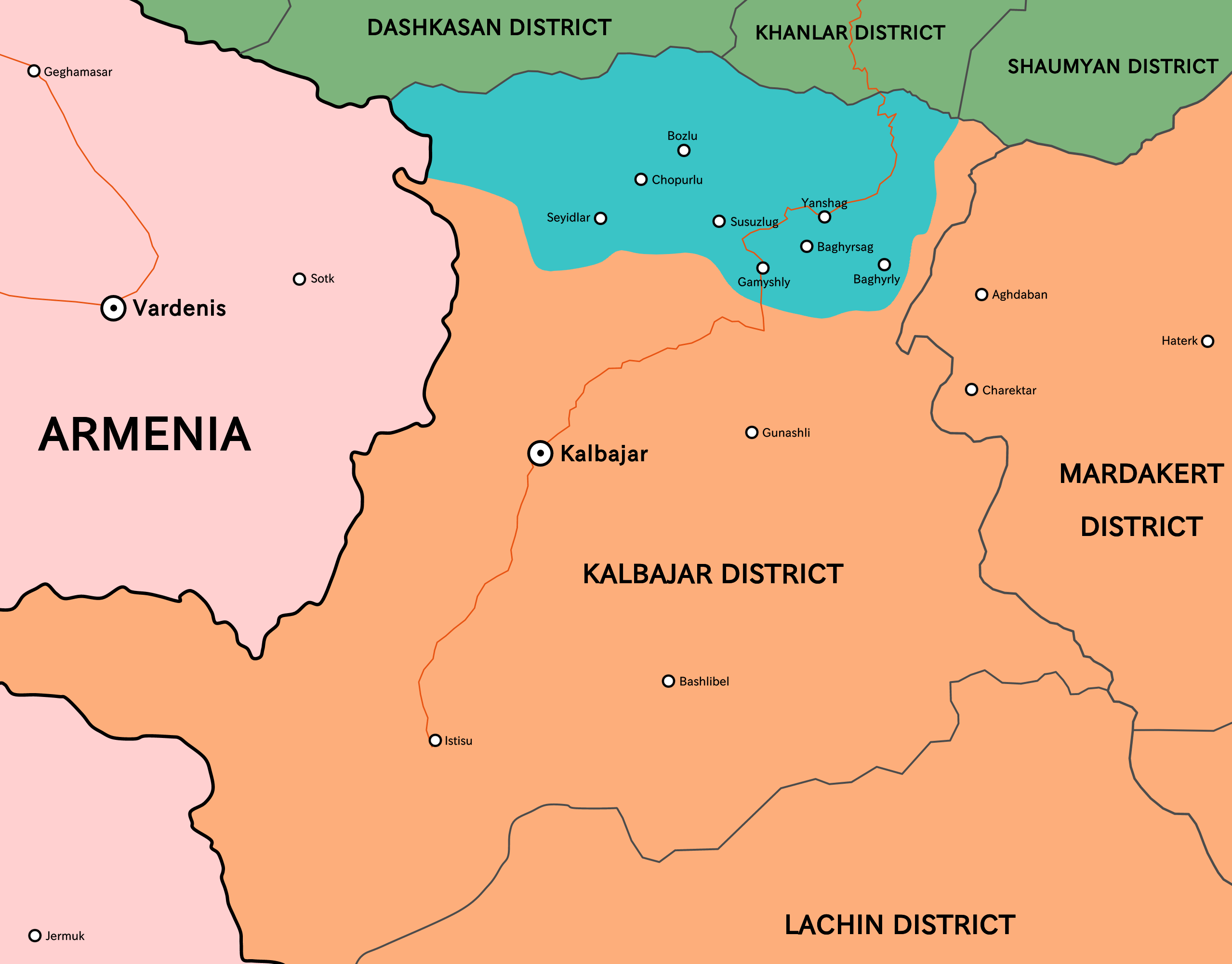
- Map showing the height of the Azerbaijani offensive (c. mid-February 1994) Areas recaptured by Azerbaijan during the operation Armenian-occupied territories Azerbaijan outside of the conflict zone Armenia
Date	15 December 1993 – 20 February 1994 (2 months and 5 days)
Location	Kalbajar, Azerbaijan
Result	At the peak of the operation, approximately 30% of the territory of the Kalbajar region was liberated from occupation, but both sides returned to their positions.

Belligerents
Azerbaijan	Nagorno-Karabakh Republic; Armenia

Commanders and leaders
Heydar Aliyev; Surat Huseynov; Najmaddin Sadigov; Mammadrafi Mammadov; Valeh Rafiyev; Saleh Ilyasov; Eldar Hasanov; Gorkmaz Garayev	(Armenia) Levon Ter-Petrosyan; (Armenia) Hrachya Andreasyan; (Armenia) Serzh Sargsyan; (Republic of Artsakh) Robert Kocharyan; (Republic of Artsakh) Samvel Babayan; (Republic of Artsakh) Arkadii Shirinyan; (Republic of Artsakh) Levon Mnatsakanyan; (Republic of Artsakh) Samvel Karapetyan; (Republic of Artsakh) Arshavir Gharamyan

Units involved
Azerbaijani Armed Forces: Azerbaijani Land Forces; 701st Kalbajar Motorised Rifle Brigade; Ministry of Internal Affairs: Kalbajar police	Nagorno-Karabakh Defence Army: Central Self-Defence Group; Armed Forces of Armenia: 555th Vardenis Motorised Rifle Regiment; 7th Gyumri Engineer Battalion; 9th Etchmiadzin Engineer Battalion

Strength
3,500 servicemen (December 1993)	+2,000 servicemen (February 1994)

Casualties and losses
~4,000 servicemen killed 1,337 servicemen died of frostbite 111 servicemen missing Several dozen equipment captured	~2,000 servicemen killed Several dozen equipment, including tanks, IFVs, and artillery captured

Operation Kalbajar (Note: (Azerbaijani: Kəlbəcər əməliyyatı) or Operation Omar pass (Armenian: Օմարի լեռնանցք գործողություն)) was a military offensive launched by the Azerbaijani Armed Forces in late 1993 against the forces of the Armenian Army and the self-proclaimed Nagorno-Karabakh Republic to recapture the district of Kalbajar in the final stage of the First Nagorno-Karabakh War.

Armenian forces had captured the entire district in an offensive in March–April 1993. These developments caused political turmoil within Azerbaijan. Azerbaijani military commander Surat Huseynov marched from Ganja to Baku in the summer of 1993, to depose the then president of Azerbaijan, Abulfaz Elchibey. Ex-Soviet leader Heydar Aliyev assumed power and made Huseynov the country's prime minister. The Armenians were easily able to push further and capture several districts of Azerbaijan adjacent to Nagorno-Karabakh during this period. Aliyev vowed to take back the lost territories.

The Azerbaijani forces, made up of over three thousand soldiers of the 701st Kalbajar Motorised Infantry Division, launched the offensive on 15 December, in high altitudes and harsh winter conditions, which led to some commanders opposing the operation. After back-and-forth action, the Azerbaijanis had passed over the Murov range by mid-January 1994. They were able to cut off the Vardenis–Martakert road and advanced towards to the Kalbajar–Martakert–Lachin road. The Armenians were caught off guard and the offensive initially met little resistance, with the Armenian forces retreating deeper into the region. By February, the Azerbaijani forces had approached Kalbajar. The offensive took a turn, and the Armenian forces were able to regroup and launch a counter-offensive with a large number of troops. They were able to cut off the road passing thorough the Omar Pass and besiege the Azerbaijani forces. The Azerbaijanis panicked and had to retreat through harsh mountainous terrain and deadly weather. By 20 February, the Azerbaijani forces were able to retreat to their original positions, except for two battalions, which were encircled by Armenian forces and fell under heavy bombardment.

The offensive is the single deadliest military engagement of the war, in which both Armenian and Azerbaijani forces suffered heavy casualties. According to British journalist Thomas de Waal, overall, more than six thousand servicemen were killed during the offensive. Many Azerbaijani soldiers, ill-prepared for winter conditions, either froze to death or died from avalanches. The high number of casualties paved the way to the signing of the Bishkek Protocol, ending the war. The Azerbaijani authorities kept their casualty numbers a secret, and it is still unknown who gave the order to launch an offensive in winter.

== Background ==
Kalbajar is one of the largest and most mountainous regions of Azerbaijan, surrounded by the Murov mountain range, consisting mostly of dense forests, rivers and springs. Historically, livestock and agriculture dominated the region's economy. Soviet authorities made the region an administrative district in August 1930, and chose the city of Kalbajar its administrative centre. The region is bordered by the Gegharkunik Province (formerly Vardenis District) in Armenia in the west, Dashkasan and Goygol (formerly Khanlar) districts in the north, Goranboy (formerly Shahumyan) in the northeast, Martakert, known to Azerbaijanis as Aghdara, in the east, Askeran in the south-east, and Lachin District in the south. (Note: During the First Nagorno-Karabakh War, the Azerbaijani authorities made changes to the administrative divisions of Azerbaijan. The Nagorno-Karabakh Autonomous Oblast was abolished, along with the Askeran, Martakert, and Shahumyan districts. Askeran was replaced with Khojaly District, Martakert (It was initially renamed as Ağdərə in 26 November 1991) was divided between Kalbajar, Tartar and Aghdam districts, while Shahumyan was incorporated into Goranboy District.) It is sandwiched between Armenia and Nagorno-Karabakh and lies outside of the former Nagorno-Karabakh Autonomous Oblast. With a population of about 60,000, the region consisted of several dozen villages mostly populated by the ethnic Azerbaijanis and Kurds. It is rich in gold and chromium deposits and is known for its healing mineral water sanatoriums.

During the Soviet era, an autonomous oblast within the Azerbaijan SSR governed the predominantly Armenian-populated Nagorno-Karabakh region. As the Soviet Union disintegrated during the late 1980s, the question of the region's status re-emerged, and on 20 February 1988, the parliament of the Nagorno-Karabakh Autonomous Oblast passed a resolution requesting transfer of the oblast from the Azerbaijani SSR to the Armenian SSR. Azerbaijan rejected the request several times, and ethnic violence began shortly after with a series of pogroms between 1988 and 1990 against Armenians in Sumgait, Ganja and Baku, and against Azerbaijanis in Gugark and Stepanakert. Following the revocation of Nagorno-Karabakh's autonomous status, an independence referendum was held in the region on 10 December 1991. The Azerbaijani population, which then constituted around 22.8% of the region's population, boycotted the referendum. 99.8% of participants voted in favour. In early 1992, following the Soviet Union's collapse, the region descended into outright war.

=== Prelude ===
Armenian forces launched an offensive on 18 May 1992 to take the city of Lachin, thus seizing control of the narrow, mountainous Lachin corridor, a key road connecting Goris in Syunik Province, southern Armenia, to Stepanakert, the regional capital for the Armenian in Nagorno-Karabakh; the only other major road connecting Armenia to Nagorno-Karabakh passes through the Murov range. The city itself was poorly guarded, and by the next day the Armenian forces had taken control of the city and burned it to the ground. All 7,800 of its original Azerbaijani and Kurdish citizens became refugees as a result of forced deportations.

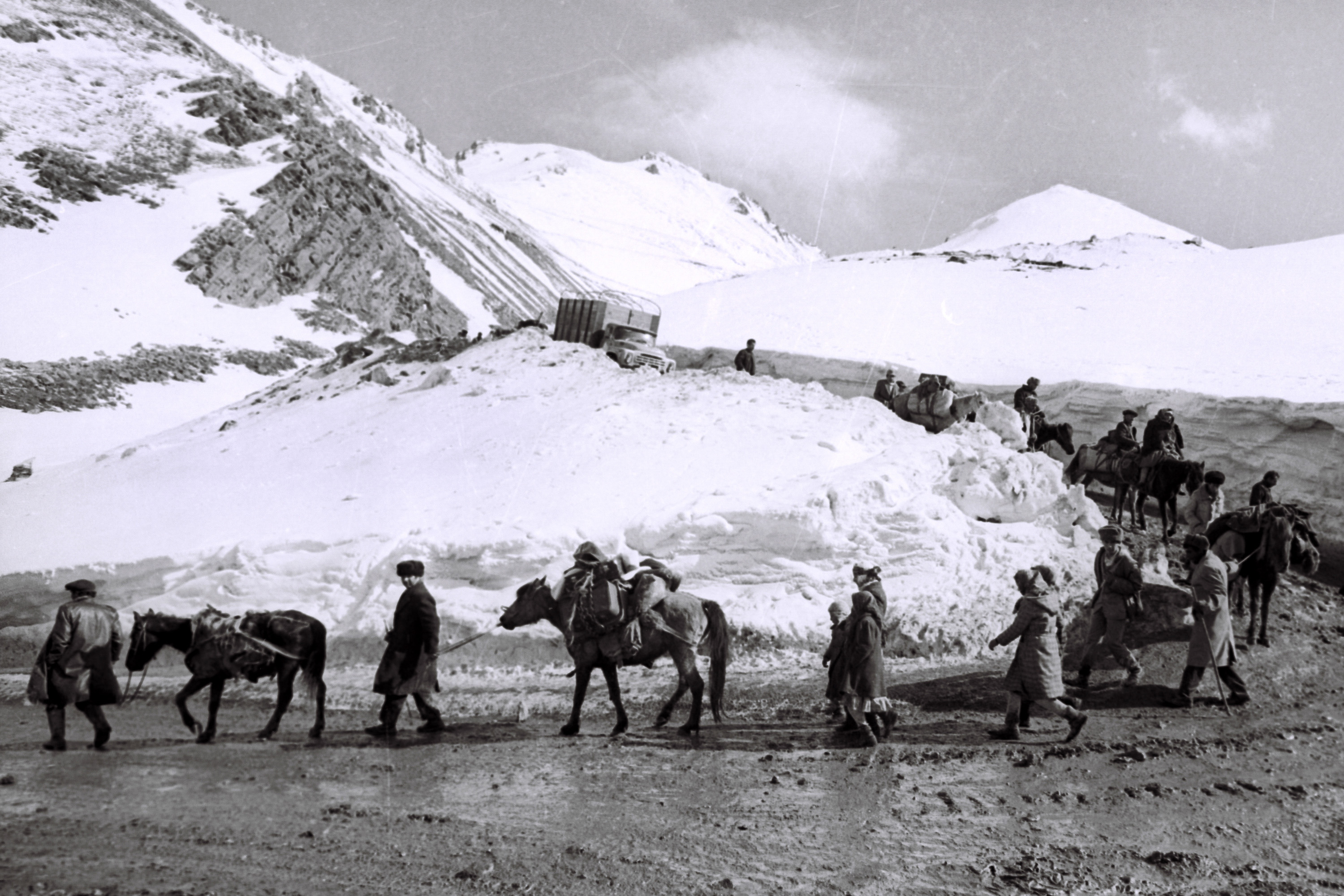
Azerbaijani refugees fleeing from Kalbajar through the Murov range.

1993 was a difficult year for Azerbaijan. The Armenian forces launched an offensive for Kalbajar in March, and fully occupied the region in April, gaining control of the highest peak in the whole of Karabakh, Mount Murovdagh. The Armenian advancement in Kalbajar was conducted with numerous violations of the rules of war, including the forcible exodus of its civilian population, indiscriminate shootings and hostage-taking. During the battle, over 500 Azerbaijani civilians were killed, and more than 60,000 were displaced. On 30 April, the United Nations Security Council (UNSC) passed Resolution 822, demanding the immediate cessation of all hostilities and the withdrawal of all occupying forces from Kalbajar. Following this, in early June, Surat Huseynov, an Azerbaijani military commander, frustrated by what he felt was then Azerbaijani president Abulfaz Elchibey's incompetence and his demotion, rebelled and marched from its base in Ganja towards Baku. During this political turmoil, the Azerbaijanis lost Martakert, Aghdam, Jabrayil, Fuzuli, Gubadly, and Zangilan. Elchibey stepped down from office on 18 June and then-parliamentary member and an ex-Soviet leader Heydar Aliyev assumed power. On 1 July, Huseynov was appointed as the prime minister of Azerbaijan. In fall, the Armenian forces were stopped as they advanced towards the city of Beylagan. As acting president, Aliyev disbanded 33 voluntary battalions of Elchibey's Azerbaijani Popular Front, which he deemed politically unreliable. He blamed the previous government for failures in the war and vowed to take back the lost territories. To compensate the voluntary battalions, he quickly and controversially recruited an army of young conscripts. Two subsequent UNSC resolutions on the Nagorno-Karabakh conflict were passed, 874 and 884, in October and November, acknowledging Nagorno-Karabakh as a region of Azerbaijan.

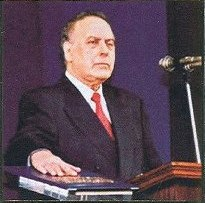
Aliyev during his Inauguration.

Aliyev appealed to the ethnic Azerbaijani military experts in the former Soviet republics, with many officers, most of whom were veterans of the Soviet–Afghan War, coming to the aid of the country. This and the nation-wide mobilisation increased the military strength of Azerbaijan. The Azerbaijani government had evacuated civilians living in the region before the offensive. The operations were to be continued at an altitude of 2,500–3,500 metres (8,200–11,500 ft) above sea level. The plan was very dangerous, as the region was devastated by harsh climate, heavy snow, strong winds and dangerous avalanches. Because of this, many commanders did not support the operation. Most of the soldiers involved in the operation were new recruits. The Azerbaijani military planned to launch an offensive from the Murov range, cutting off the Vardenis–Martakert road. They were then to capture the city of Kalbajar, moving deeper into the Kalbajar District, and at the same time, push from Tartar, thus encircling the Armenian troops.

=== Comparison of forces ===
The 701st Azerbaijani Motorised Rifle Brigade carried out the offensive. The brigade consisted of a total of 3,500 servicemen. Its commander was Lieutenant-Colonel Valeh Rafiyev, chief of staff was Lieutenant-Colonel Eldar Hasanov, and chief of operations was Major Gorkhmaz Garayev. The brigade consisted of six battalions:

- 1st Azerbaijani Battalion, led by Gurban Gurbanov
- 2nd Azerbaijani Battalion, led by Habib Shabanov
- 3rd Azerbaijani Battalion, led by Balay Nasibov
- 4th Azerbaijani Battalion, led by Hafiz Mammadov
- 5th Azerbaijani Battalion, led by Garay Asadov
- 6th Azerbaijani Battalion, led by Vali Bayramov

Kalbajar District shown within Azerbaijan's contemporary administrative divisions.

In early-February 1994, the Central Self-Defence Group of the NKR were led by the chief of staff of the Armenian Armed Forces, lieutenant general Hrach Andresyan. The Armenian forces only in the south consisted of more than 2,000 servicemen. The whole army group consisted of several regiments and battalions:

- Stepanakert Regiment, led by Levon Mnatsakanyan.
- Askeran Self-Defence District, led by Vitaly Balasanyan.
- 35th Self-Defence Battalion, led by Arshavir Gharamyan.
- 42nd Self-Defence Battalion, led by Arkady Shirinyan.
- 43rd Self-Defence Battalion, led by Ilich Baghryan.
- 77th Self-Defence Battalion, led by Petros Gevondyan.

In addition, the NKR was assisted by the units of the Armenian Armed Forces, which consisted of:

- 555th Vardenis Motorised Rifle Regiment.
- 7th Gyumri Engineer Battalion.
- 9th Etchmiadzin Engineer Battalion.

Several Azerbaijani commanders also alleged that the Armenian forces were supported by the Russian artillery during their counter-offensive.

== Offensive ==
=== Crossing the Murov ===
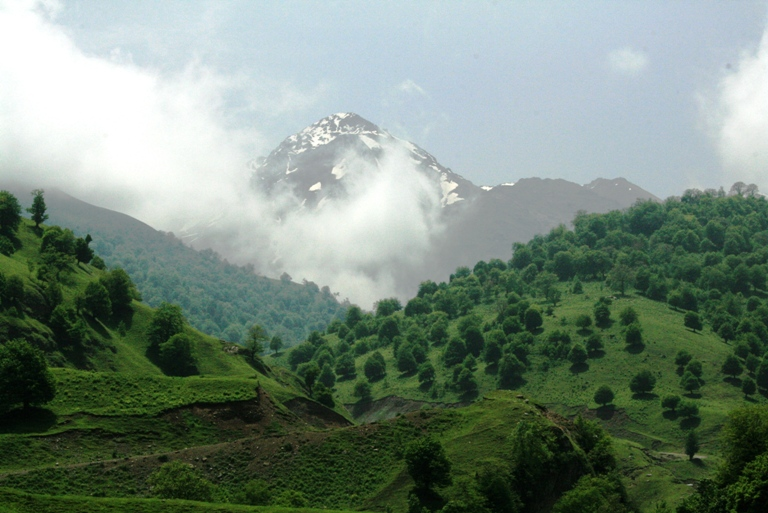
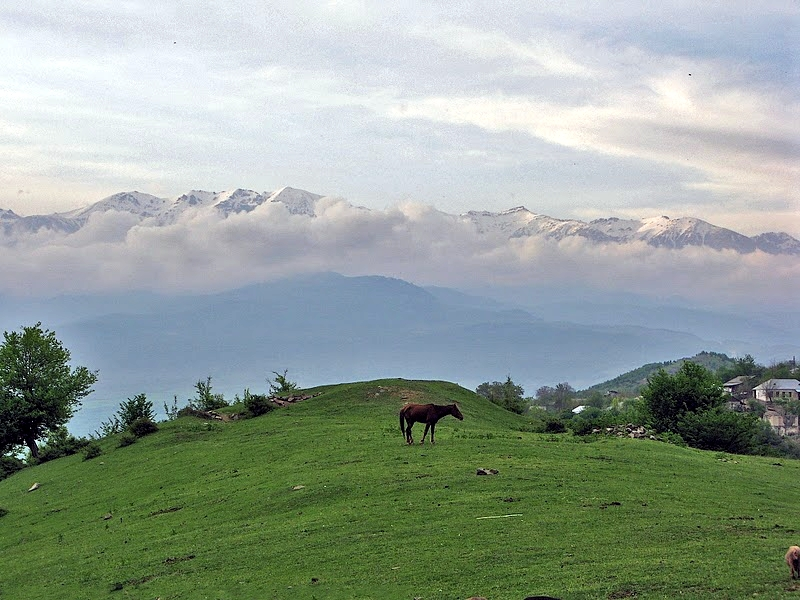
alt=Two photographs of the Murov mountain range

The military operation began with an Azerbaijani offensive in December 1993 along the entire northern front, advancing from the Murov mountain range. The 3rd Azerbaijani Battalion, advancing from Alakhanchally and Zivlan, moved towards the Murov. The 5th Battalion, led by Garay Asadov, launched Operation Meydanchay on 28 December, moving towards the Meydan Plain in the Murovdagh range. They moved over Mount Koroghlu at night, from the right side of the Guzgu Pass, to get behind the Armenian lines, setting up positions near Yanshag and Zallar on 1 January 1994 after eliminating the Armenian forces. The 3rd Azerbaijani Battalion attacked the Omar Pass, taking control of the area and inflicting casualties on the untrained Armenian conscripts of the Vanadzor Regiment. They crossed the pass and attacked the Hill 31–46. The Armenian military post at the hill was able to suppress the main movement of the Azerbaijani forces. However, the Azerbaijani forces soon seized control of the hill, pushing back the Armenians. The 2nd and 3rd Azerbaijani battalions were moved to Meydan Plain, and, along with the 5th Battalion, attacked the Armenian forces from their behind. The Armenian forces soon retreated. After that, the Azerbaijani military cleared the Omar Pass of landmines and established a battalion defence zone on the Meydan Plain.

On 2 January, the 3rd Azerbaijani Battalion captured Bozlu, Babashlar and Takagaya after heavy fighting. Simultaneously, the 2nd Azerbaijani Battalion launched an attack on Yanshag but failed. The Armenian forces then counter-attacked and recaptured the lost villages. The 3rd Battalion retreated to its previous positions in Dashkasan District to avoid being besieged. On 4 January, the 3rd Azerbaijani Battalion crossed the Murov range again and advanced towards their previous positions. Due to initial failures, the high command had to change the officers leading the Azerbaijani forces. They appointed Feyruz Alishov as the commander of the 3rd Azerbaijani Battalion, and Intigam Maharramov as the commander of the 2nd Azerbaijani Battalion. A few days later, the Azerbaijani Minister of Defence, Mammadrafi Mammadov, issued a decree, dismissing the commander of the 701st Motorised Rifle Brigade, Valeh Rafiyev and replacing him with Saleh Ilyasov. Rafiyev said later that the Azerbaijani prosecutor general Ali Omarov and the speaker of the Azerbaijani Parliament Rasul Guliyev played a major role in this decision.

The Azerbaijani forces launched another attack in mid-January, passing over the Murov range. On 16 January, the 1st and 3rd Azerbaijani battalions captured Mount Susuzlug. From here, the Azerbaijani troops had fire control over Meydanchay and Yansha. The next day, the 2nd Azerbaijani Battalion captured Shishgaya Hill, located east of the Meydanchay. On 19 January, the 5th Azerbaijani Battalion captured Gyzylgaya Hill. The following day, the 5th Azerbaijani Battalion captured the Baghyrsag, the 1st Battalion captured Yanshag, and the 3rd Battalion captured Susuzlug. Thus, the Armenian troops retreated to the depths of Kalbajar in late-January. On 21 January, the 2nd Azerbaijani Battalion, which entered Gamyshly, captured the Chichakli plateau, thus taking control of the Kalbajar–Martakert–Lachin road. The 5th Azerbaijani Battalion also attacked Baghyrly. The next day, the Azerbaijani forces seized control of Yanshagbina and Gasymbinasi. The Azerbaijani forces captured the strategic Omar Pass and the road passing through it, further strengthening their positions.

=== Push for Kalbajar ===
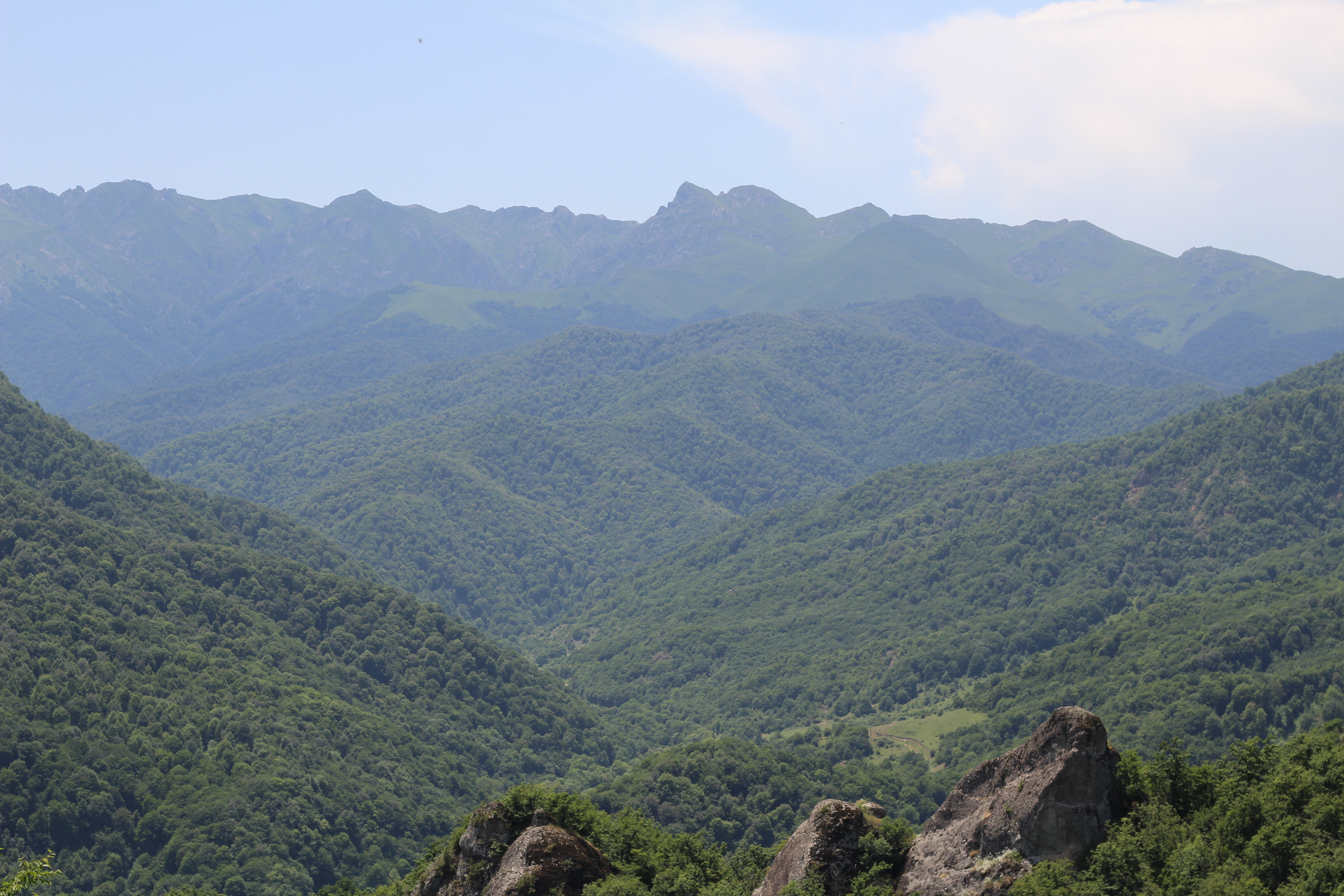
Kalbajar itself is mostly filled with tall mountains and dense forests.

On 23 January, the 3rd Azerbaijani Battalion besieged an Armenian battalion in Chapli. According to the British journalist Thomas de Waal, 240 Armenian soldiers were killed in the village; Mikhail Zhirohov believes the number to be 200. The Azerbaijani forces captured three tanks, four infantry fighting vehicles and a ZSU-23-4 Shilka tank. The Armenian forces launched a counter-attack and took control of Chapli the following day, but were driven out of their positions in the village on 27 January. The fleeing Armenian troops were forced to retreat towards Seyidlar. Thus, the road from Armenia to Kalbajar came under Azerbaijan's control. The following day, the 1st, 3rd and 4th Azerbaijani battalions, which continued their push deeper into the Kalbajar District, captured Ganlykend, Bozlu, Babashlar, Tekagaya, Ilyaslar, and Chopurlu. Two days later, they captured Seyidlar, Lev, Damirchidam, and Jamilli. The Azerbaijani command then instructed the 5th Azerbaijani battalion to continue the attack on the heights around Buzduk and the 1st and 3rd Azerbaijani battalions to take the heights around Sotk. These operations were in preparation for the impending attack on the city of Kalbajar.

By February, the Azerbaijani forces had recaptured about 30% of the Kalbajar District. The 1st, 3rd and 4th Azerbaijani battalions had approached the border with Armenia in the west, setting up positions along the Jamilli–Demirchidam–Ganlykend line. The central forces were the 2nd Azerbaijani Battalion, which had dug in near Gamyshly and Chichakli, while in the east, the 5th Azerbaijani Battalion took up positions in Baghyrly.

=== Retreat ===
The Armenian forces regrouped in early February. The NKR military authorities attacked the Central Self-Defence Group, coordinated by Vitaly Balasanyan, the commander of the Askeran Self-Defence District, and stationed in Stepanakert, to Kalbajar. The NKR authorities moved the army group to Martakert.

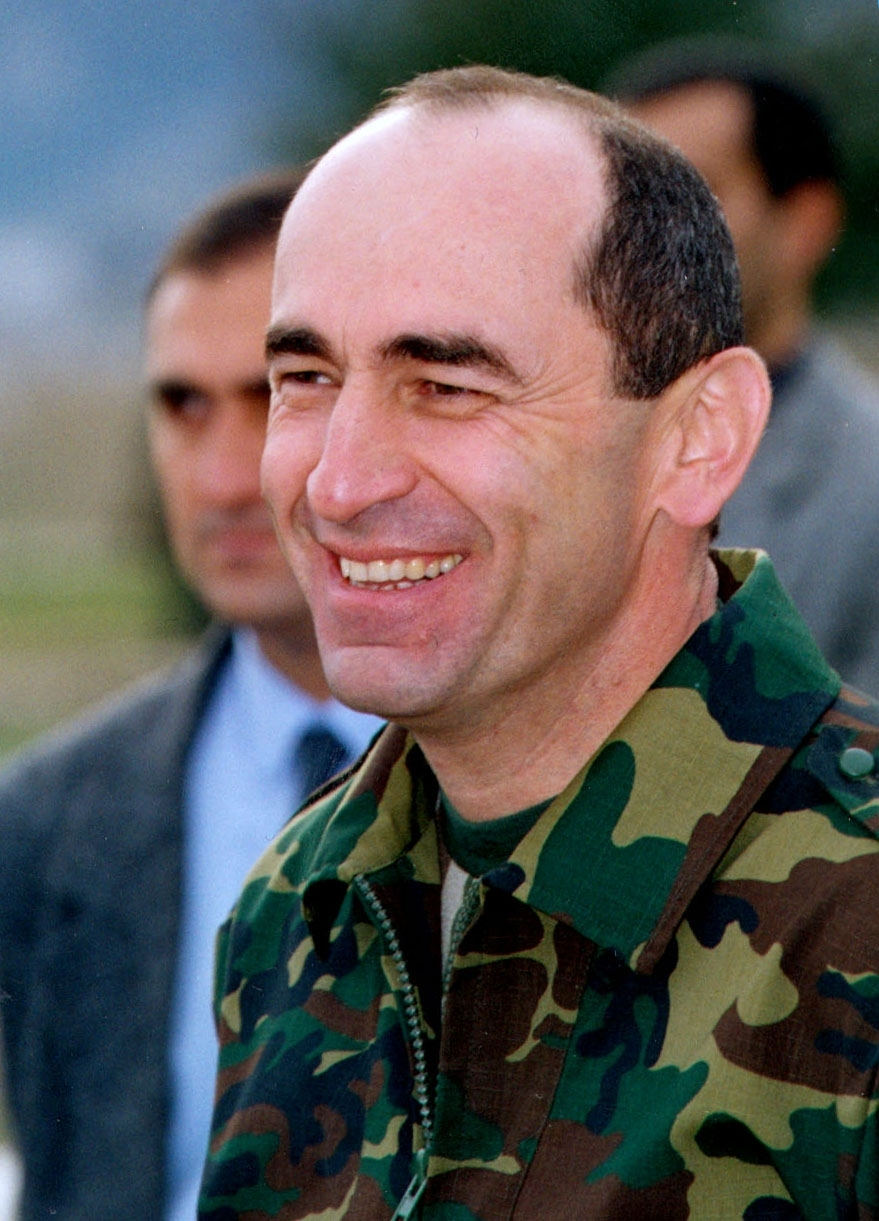
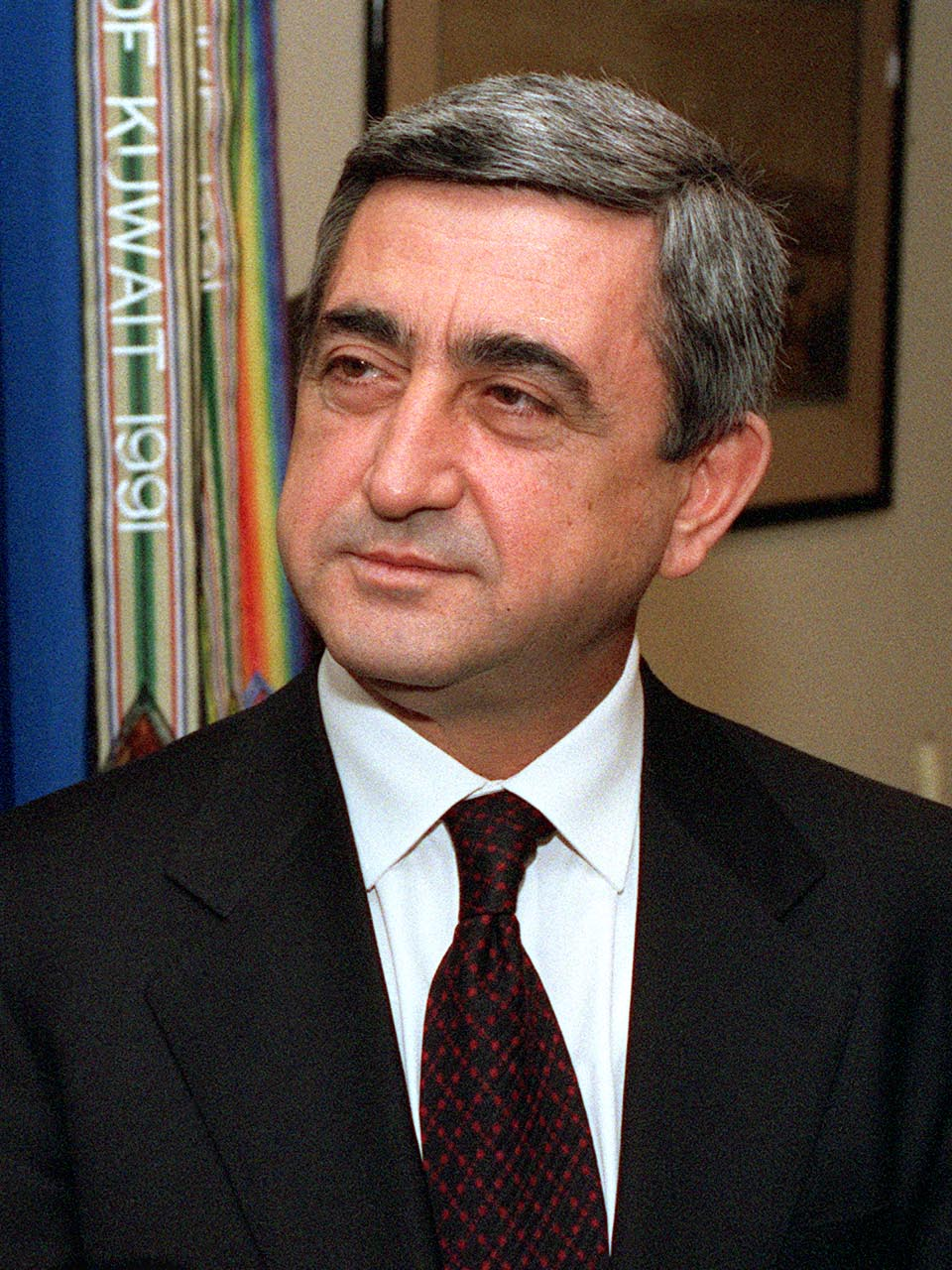
At the time, Serzh Sargsyan (on right) was the Armenian Minister of Defence, while Robert Kocharyan (on left) was the self-declared prime minister of the NKR.

According to the initial plan, the Armenian troops were to capture the Chichakli plateau. On 2 February, the Armenian forces attacked Gamyshly from the east, but the 2nd Azerbaijani Battalion repulsed them. The Armenian forces attacked the plateau the following day, but the 2nd Azerbaijani Battalion defended their positions and repulse the attacking Armenian troops. Nevertheless, on 6 February, the Armenian forces captured Chichakli, but lost it two days later, while the 1st and 3rd Azerbaijani battalions were ordered to continue their attack and take the heights around Sotk. Chichakli was well defended, thus, the Armenian troops increased the pressure from Martakert. The Armenian command was forced to move their focus to the heights in the plateau's northeast, and take control of the Kalbajar–Ganja road, passing from the Omar Pass over Chichakli. On 11 February, the Armenians attacked from Aghdaban with a large force and captured Hill 2071 and the heights around Baghyrly. The next day, they entered Baghirsagh. The Azerbaijani troops attempted several counter-attacks but failed each time. Continuing their push, the Armenian force captured the Aghgaya Hill and Hill 2868. In mid-February, the Armenian troops occupied Yanshag and Yanshagbina. Thus, the Armenian forces took control of the road from the Omar Pass to Kalbajar, cutting off the Azerbaijani supply lines and besieging the 701st Azerbaijani Motorised Rifle Brigade. The Azerbaijani forces were ordered to retreat on 14 February, while the Armenian forces in Jamilli captured Alishov. As the main road connecting the Azerbaijani forces to their starting point was under Armenian control, the Azerbaijani troops were forced to retreat via the narrow Susuzlug–Tekagaya–Agdagh road. The Azerbaijanis left all of their heavy equipment, and hundreds of soldiers froze to death or went missing. Some soldiers burned their jackets to keep warm from the cold, and the bodies of those who died of frostbite were not removed. Some Azerbaijani soldiers went crazy, with some singing and running into the cold river to swim, while those sitting on the ground froze in place. The Armenian forces were shelling the mountain tops to create avalanches, resulting in the deaths of many Azerbaijani servicemen. The Azerbaijani retreat lasted until 20 February. The Armenian side was able to besiege two Azerbaijani brigades. The Azerbaijani troops launched several unsuccessful attacks from the Khanlar District (modern-day Goranboy) on the Armenian positions to reopen the supply lines. De Waal noted the Armenian forces heavily bombarded the besieged Azerbaijani battalions with BM-21 Grad missiles. As a result of this attack alone, about 1,500 Azerbaijani soldiers were killed.

== Casualties ==
The offensive is one of the deadliest military engagements of the First Nagorno-Karabakh War, in which both Armenian and Azerbaijani forces suffered heavy casualties. According to Thomas de Waal, the Azerbaijani side suffered about 4,000 casualties during the military operations at Omar Pass; the Armenian side lost some 2,000 servicemen. De Waal noted a few years after the offensive, travellers to the Murov range still found frozen bodies. In later years, the Armenians collected hundreds of military identity documents belonging to the Azerbaijani soldiers who had died at Omar Pass. An Armenian television film crew filmed them for broadcast.

A significant number of the losses on the Azerbaijani side were due to frostbite and avalanches. The Azerbaijani side kept the number of losses secret at the time, and there is still no official information of the number Azerbaijani troop who died. According to the latest information from Azerbaijani sources, during the offensive, the army lost 1,592 servicemen; 1,337 froze to death, and 111 went missing.

== Aftermath ==
The Armenian forces were able to secure their positions in Kalbajar and seize control of the Omar and Guzgu passes in the Murov range. The scale of losses during the offensive helped pave the way for the Bishkek Protocol in May 1994, ending the war.

The Azerbaijani offensive was carried out in very difficult winter conditions. In addition, the Azerbaijani army had launched a very risky operation, with an imminent threat of possible encirclement. The 701st Azerbaijani Motorised Infantry Brigade moved too far from the Azerbaijani positions on the other side of the Murov range creating problems resupplying the troops advancing through the crossings during the winter. The limited number of advancing Azerbaijani units made it harder to evacuate wounded soldiers and damaged military equipment or receive reinforcements, while the Armenian military could transfer additional troops from Nagorno-Karabakh. The inability of the Azerbaijani military to support its forces from Martakert made their position more deplorable.

The offensive itself and the responsibility of Aliyev's government became a highly sensitive topic among Azerbaijani authorities. It is still unclear who decided to attack Kalbajar in the winter. Former Azerbaijani minister of defence, Mammadrafi Mammadov, later called the decision "foolish" and said he opposed it at the time. According to Mammadov, some political leaders were able to convince the Azerbaijani Defence Council that the attack on Kalbajar would be successful. Mammadov claimed that the operation plan belonged to then prosecutor general of Azerbaijan, Ali Omarov, who had close relations with Aliyev, and noted that Omarov believed Kalbajar would be captured easily. Garay Asadov, a former Azerbaijani battalion commander, said the attack in the winter was "completely wrong". According to him, if the operation had been held in the summer, Armenian forces would not have occupied the Aghdam and Fuzuli regions. Their forces in Murovdag were very small, and an attack from there would aggravate their situation leading the Armenian leadership to order a withdrawal from Aghdam and Fuzuli. Azerbaijan's then deputy minister of defence, Leyla Yunus, blamed the commanders for making a bad situation even worse. According to her, the Azerbaijani chief of general staff, Najmeddin Sadikov, launched the offensive instead of suspending it because of the worsening weather, calling it the "stupidest decision a military officer could ever take". Eldar Namazov, who was the head of the presidential administration for Aliyev's government, blamed Huseynov for the failure. Namazov stated the operation was thoroughly planned, and was initially successful, though the military command led by Huseynov made serious mistakes later on. He did not coordinate his decisions with Aliyev because of serious disagreements. Azad Isazadeh, who worked at the press office for the ministry of defence during the war, disagreed with this verdict, saying the operation could have been carried out only on the orders of Aliyev himself. Isazadeh compared the offensive to the Soviet technique of cotton harvesting, recruiting many completely unprepared young Azerbaijanis from the streets of Baku and throwing them into battle. According to Azerbaijani researcher Tural Hamid, Chief of General Staff Major General Najmaddin Sadigov "should have understood that the operation would end tragically ... because in winter the army could not conduct successful military operations at an altitude of almost 3,700 meters". According to him, the units of the 701st Brigade did not receive special training in winter operations in the high mountains, and were not equipped with mountain or ski equipment.

Following the offensive, a criminal case was launched in Azerbaijan. From 29 June to 18 August 1995, the military board of the Supreme Court of Azerbaijan, chaired by Shahin Rustamov, supervised the trial on the failure of the offensive. The court sentenced the brigade commander Saleh Ilyasov to seven years, the battalion commander Garay Asadov to six years, and the battalion chief Jalil Ibrahimov to ten years in prison. The case of Deputy Brigade Commander Nariman Zeynalov was returned to the Military Prosecutor's Office for further investigation.

On 18 February 2014, the ex-Armenian servicemen in Vardenis celebrated the twentieth anniversary of the Armenian victory in Omar Pass.

Azerbaijani forces recaptured Mount Murovdagh, a strategic position in the Murov range, during the Second Nagorno-Karabakh War, which allowed them to cut off the Vardenis–Martakert road.

== Sources ==
- Brown, Michael E. (1996). The International Dimensions of Internal Conflict. Cambridge: MIT Press. ISBN 0-262-52209-8.
- Cheterian, Vicken (2008). War and peace in the Caucasus: ethnic conflict and the new geopolitics. Columbia University Press. ISBN 9780231700641.
- Croissant, Michael P. (1998). The Armenia-Azerbaijan conflict: causes and implications. Greenwood Publishing Group. ISBN 9780275962418.
- de Waal, Thomas (2018). The Caucasus. An Introduction. Oxford: Oxford University Press.
- Gaffarov, Tahir (2008). Azərbaycan tarixi. Yeddi cilddə [History of Azerbaijan. In seven volumes] (in Azerbaijani). Vol. 7th. Azerbaijan National Academy of Sciences. ISBN 978-9952-448-36-8.
- Kamal, Akif. Kəlbəcər batalyonu və əfsanəvi alay [Kalbajar Battalion and the Legendary Regiment] (PDF) (in Azerbaijani). Archived from the original (PDF) on 18 April 2020.
- Kocharyan, Robert (2018). Жизнь и свобода: Автобиография экс-президента Армении и Карабаха [Life and Freedom: Autobiography of the Ex-President of Armenia and Karabakh] (in Russian). Intellektualnaya literatura.
- Melkonian, Markar (2005). My Brother's Road: An American's Fateful Journey to Armenia. New York: I. B. Tauris. ISBN 1-85043-635-5.
- Valimammadov, Mammad. Очерки по Карабахской войне [Essays on the Karabakh War] (in Russian). ЛитРес.
- Walker, Christopher J. (1996). "The Armenian presence in mountainous Karabakh". In Wright, F. R. John; Goldenberg, Suzanne; Schofield, Richard (eds.). Transcaucasian boundaries. London: UCL Press. ISBN 978-1857282351.
- Walker, Edward (February 1998). "No War, No Peace in the Caucasus: Contested Sovereignty in Chechnya, Abkhazia, and Karabakh" (PDF). Belfer Center for Science and International Affairs Occasional. Archived from the original (PDF) on 2021-11-06.
- Zhirohov, Mikhail (2012). Семена распада. войны и конфликты на территории бывшего СССР [The seeds of decay. wars and conflicts on the territory of the former USSR] (in Russian). BHV-Peterburg.
- Azerbaijan: Seven Years of Conflict in Nagorno-Karabakh. Human Rights Watch, Helsinki Watch. 1994. ISBN 9781564321428.
- "Rebel troops push toward Azeri capital". Toronto Star. 21 June 1993. Archived from the original on 6 October 2016.
