= Qamışlı =

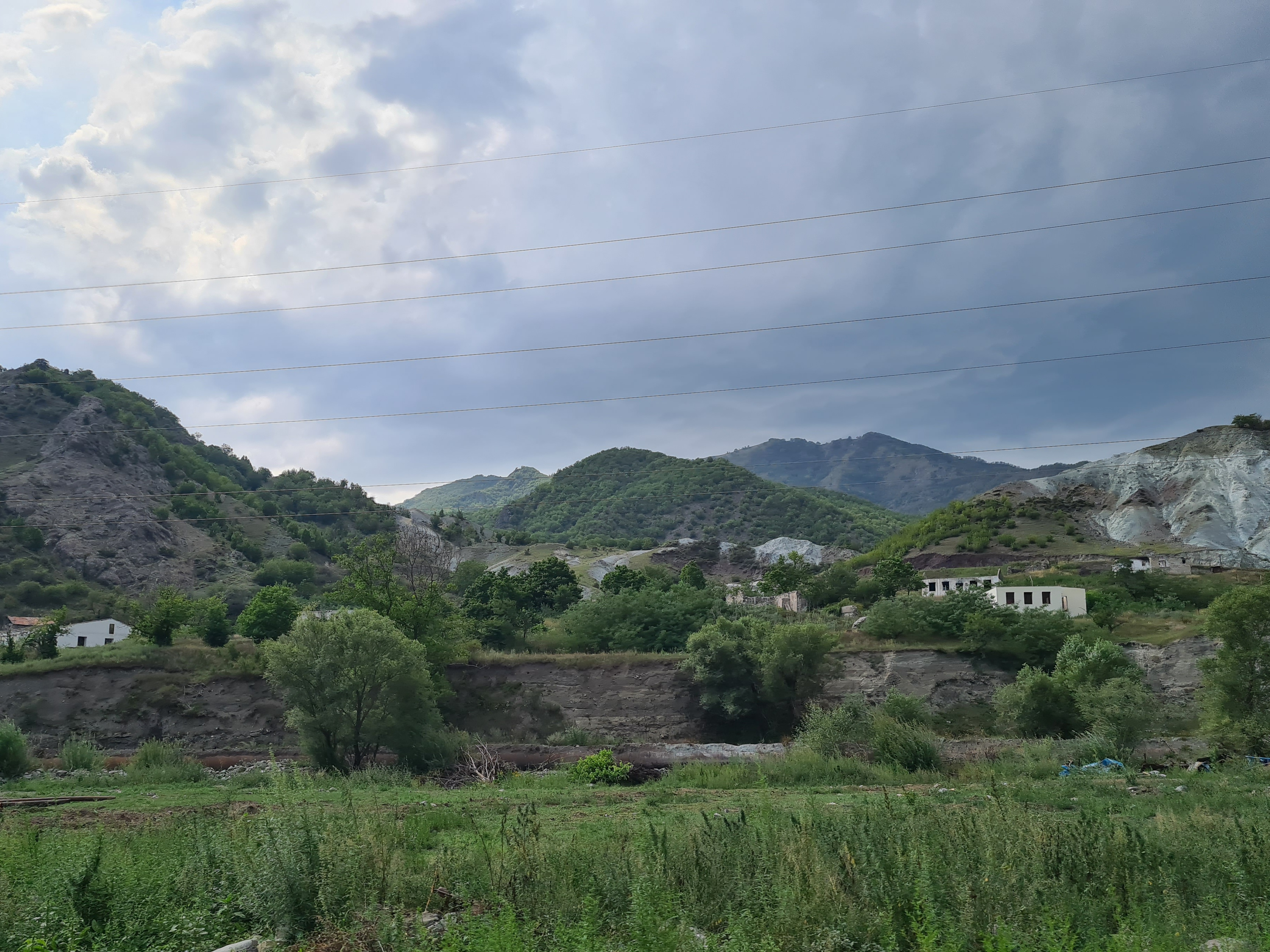

- Location within Azerbaijan Location within East Zangezur Economic Region
- Coordinates: 40°12′23″N 46°11′41″E
- Country: Azerbaijan
- District: Kalbajar

Population (2015)
  - Total: 249
- Time zone: UTC+4 (AZT)

Qamışlı (Azerbaijani pronunciation: [gɑmɯʃˈlɯ]) is a village in the Kalbajar District of Azerbaijan. It is situated along the Levçay river.

== History ==
Qamışlı was part of the Jevanshir Uyezd of Elisabethpol Governorate during the Russian Empire. According to 1886 census data, there were 22 homes and 183 Kurds of the Shiite branch of Islam in Qamışlı. According to the 1912 publication of the Caucasian Calendar, the village of Qamışlı was home to 121 people, the majority of whom were Azerbaijanis (classified as "Tatars" in the census).

Qamışlı was part of the village council of the same name in the Kalbajar District of the Azerbaijan SSR during the early Soviet period in 1933. The village had 58 farms and a total population of 320 people. The population of the village council, which also included the villages of Ağdaban, Bağırsaq, Bağırlı, Yanşaq, Susuzluq, and Zallar, was 100 percent Azerbaijani.

During the First Nagorno-Karabakh War, Qamışlı changed hands several times. The Armenian forces launched an offensive in 1993, capturing the entire Kalbajar district. A year later, during the Operation Kalbajar, Azerbaijani forces recaptured Qamışlı, but the Armenians soon launched a counter-offensive, forcing the Azerbaijanis to abandon the village. It was later incorporated into the breakaway Republic of Artsakh as part of its Shahumyan Province, where it was known as Yeghegnut (Armenian: Եղեգնուտ). Qamışlı was returned to Azerbaijan on 25 November 2020 as part of the 2020 Nagorno-Karabakh ceasefire agreement.

== Historical heritage sites ==
Historical heritage sites in and around the village include the medieval bridge of Shahi (Շահի, lit. 'of the king'), a khachkar and a stele from between the 12th and 13th centuries, as well as a 13th/14th-century chapel.

== Demographics ==
Year	Population	Ethnic composition	Source
1886	183	100% Shiite Kurds	Transcaucasian Statistical Committee
1912	121	Mainly Tatars (later known as Azerbaijanis)	Caucasian Calendar
1933	320	100% Azerbaijanis	Statistics of Azerbaijan SSR
1993: Occupation of Qamışlı. Expulsion of Azerbaijani population
2005	171	~100% Armenians	NKR census
2015	249	~100% Armenians	NKR estimate

== Gallery ==
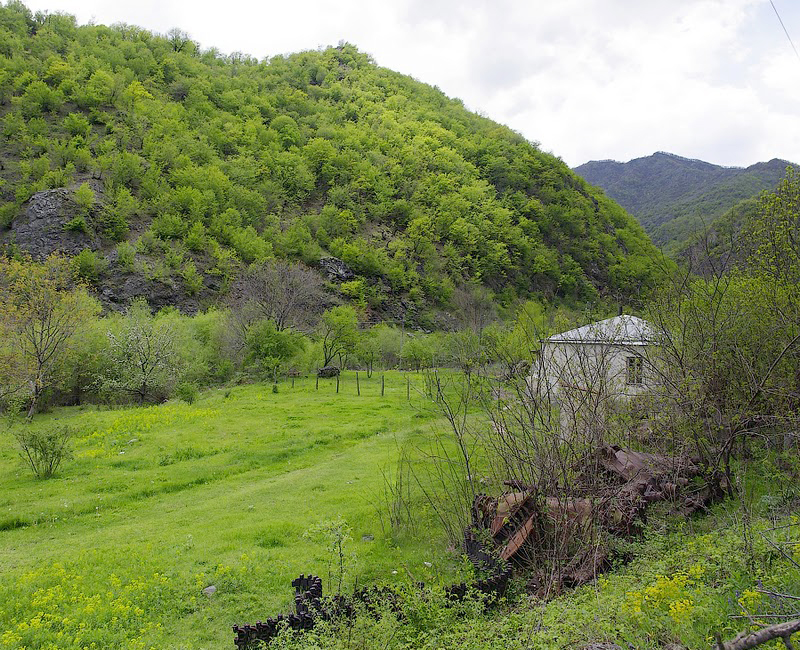

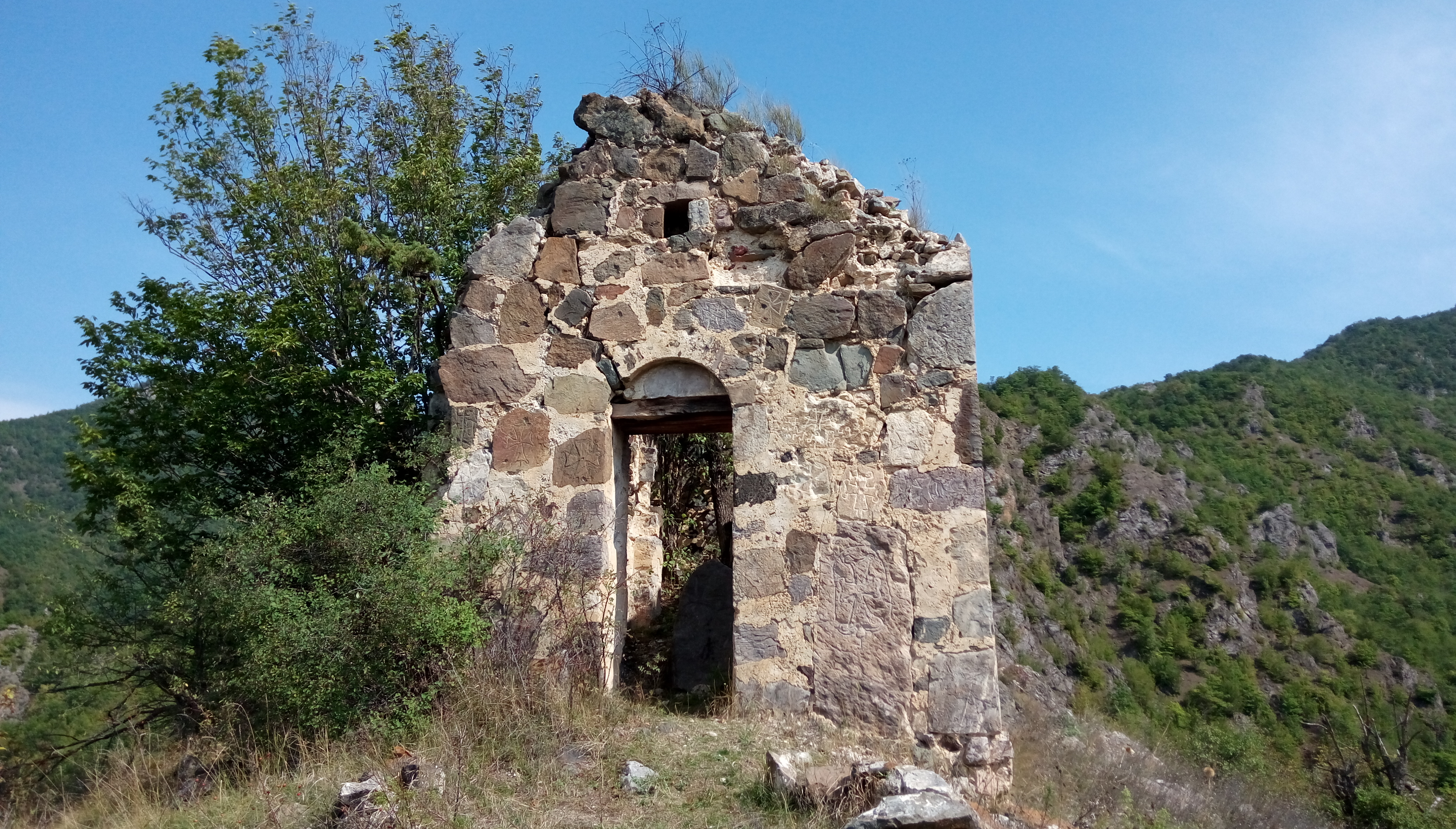
13th/14th-century chapel

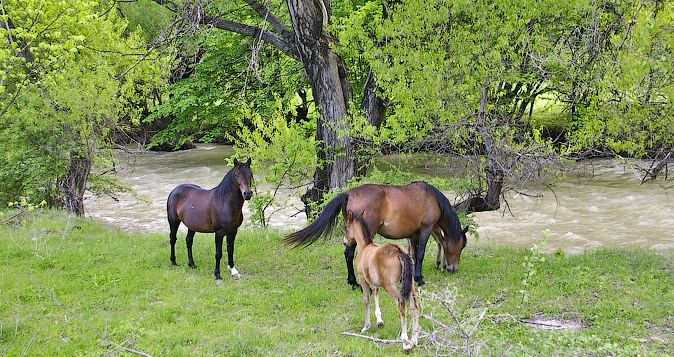

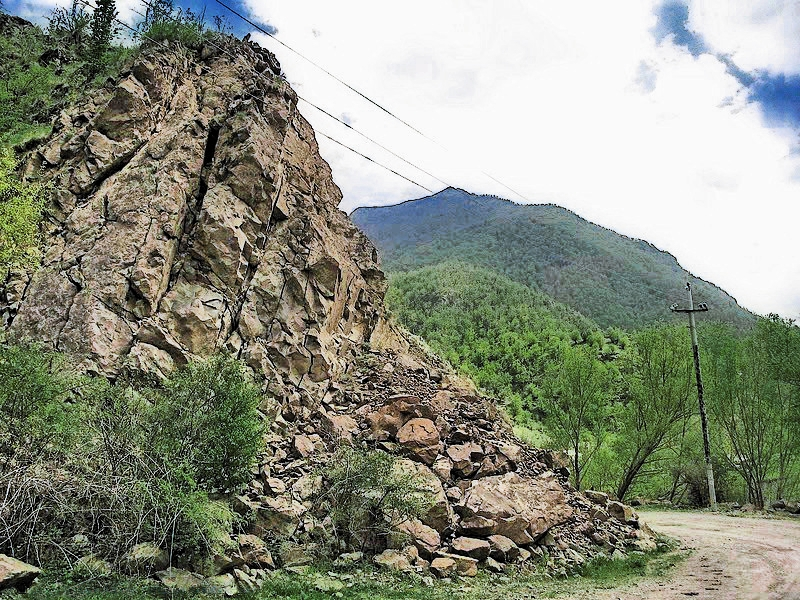

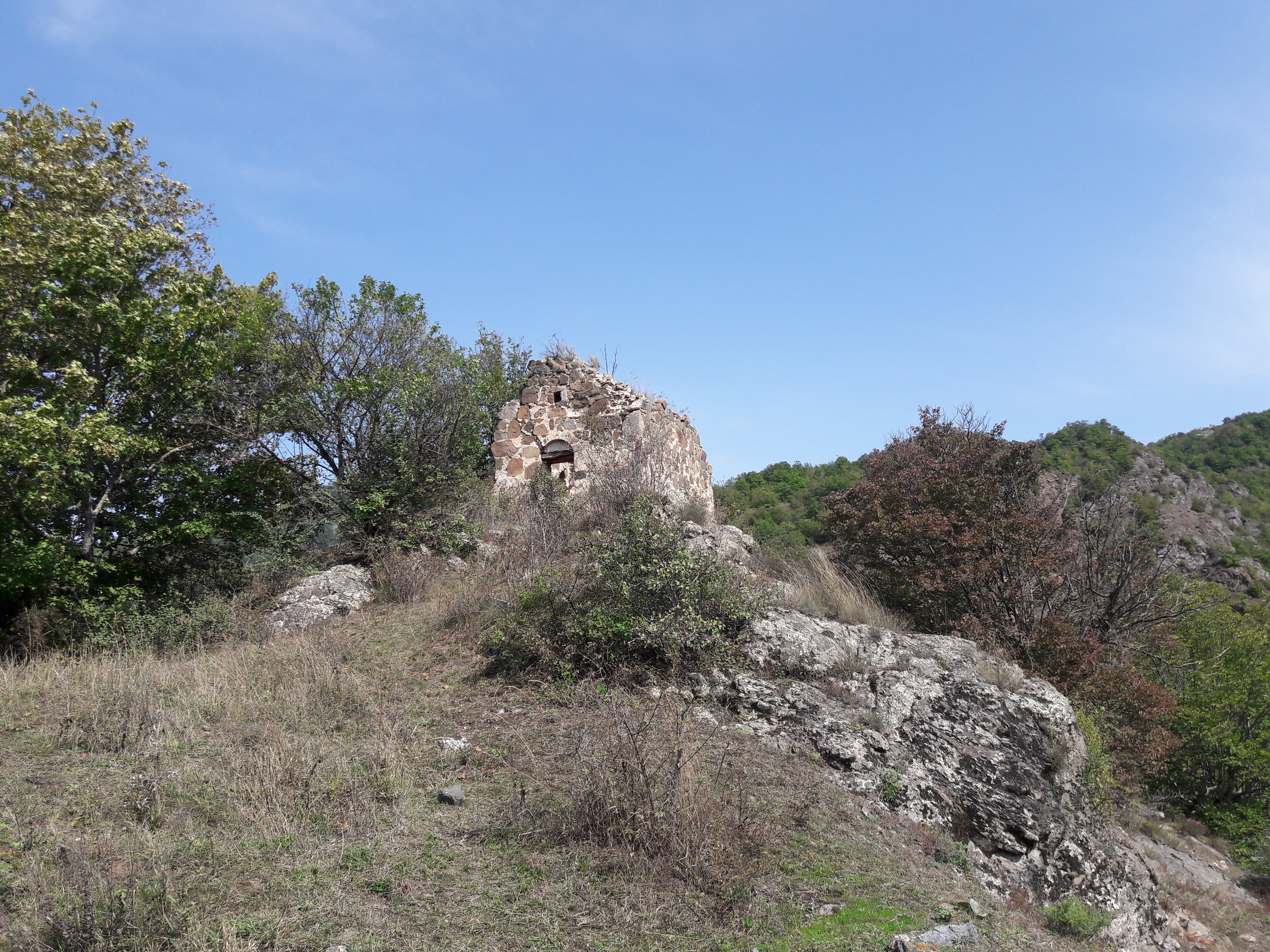
13th/14th-century chapel

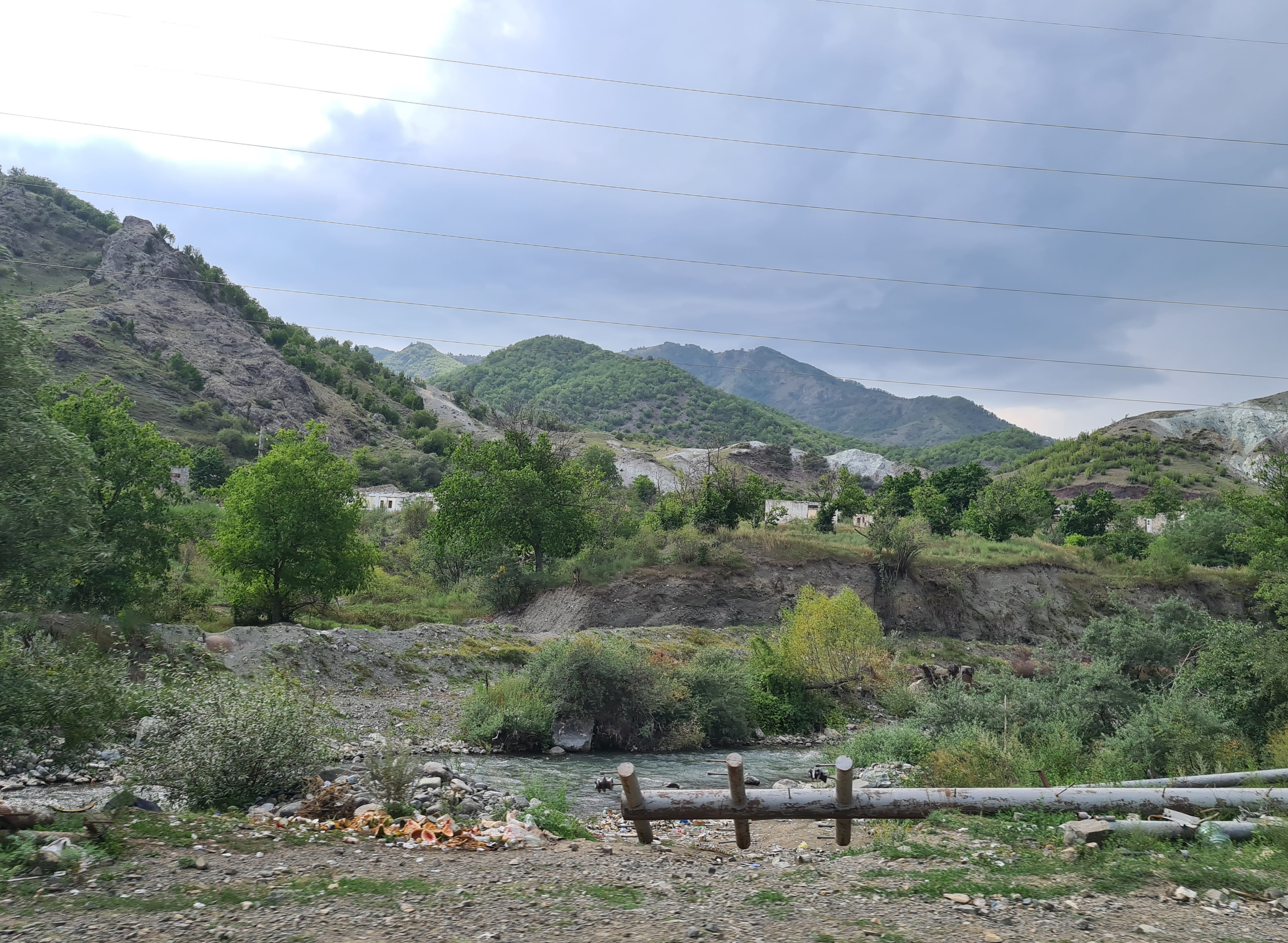
