= Susuzluq explosion =

2021 explosion in Azerbaijan

- Location: Susuzluq, Kalbajar District; Azerbaijan
- Date: June 4, 2021; 11:00 a.m. (UTC+04:00)
- Attack type: Anti-tank mine explosion
- Deaths: 3
- Injuries: 4

The Susuzluq explosion was a mine explosion in the vicinity of the village of Susuzluq in Azerbaijan's Kalbajar region, which occurred on 4 June 2021. The explosion killed 3 people, two of them journalists, and wounded another 4. This is the first case of journalist death on Azerbaijani territory after the 2020 Nagorno-Karabakh war.

The Azerbaijani side thereafter accused Armenia of not providing maps of mined areas to Azerbaijan. Ambassadors and embassies of various countries in Azerbaijan, as well as representatives from the Human Rights Watch, the Council of Europe, the OSCE, and the International Federation of Journalists expressed their concerns over the incident and offered their condolences.

== Background ==

The Kalbajar district was seized by Armenian forces in 1993, during the First Nagorno-Karabakh War, after which 60 thousand Azerbaijanis and Kurds living in the region were displaced; more than 150 Azerbaijanis were taken hostage to be exchanged with Armenian prisoners.

On 25 November 2020, the Kalbajar region, according to the trilateral ceasefire agreement, was returned to Azerbaijani control.

Demining of the territories affected by the Karabakh conflict remains one of the main issues between Azerbaijan and Armenia after the Second Karabakh War. According to the official data, since the ceasefire agreement was signed, more than 120 Azerbaijani military and civilians died or were injured as a result of mine incidents. Azerbaijan has repeatedly demanded Armenia to provide the maps of minefields. Azerbaijan also sent two complaints to the European Court of Human Rights, stressing that without transferring data on mined territories, the risk of such events will persist.

On 12 May, a border crisis started between the two countries, during which Azerbaijani forces repeatedly crossed several kilometers into Internationally recognised Armenian territory. On 27 May, Azerbaijan detained six Armenian servicemen, with allegations that they were trying to mine the territory of Kalbajar. The Armenian authorities stated that they were engaged in strengthening the defence of the border region by planting a minefield with warning signs on Armenian territory.

On 28 May 2021, the EU spokesperson Peter Stano called for immediate de-escalation and urged both sides to pull back their forces to positions held before 12 May and engage in negotiations on border delimitation and demarcation, welcoming proposals for a possible international observation mission and expressing readiness to provide expertise and help on border delimitation and demarcation. The EU continues to call on Azerbaijan to release all prisoners of war and detainees without delay and welcomes all efforts aimed at decreasing tensions.

== Incident ==
The employees of the State News Agency of Azerbaijan (AZERTAC) and the Azerbaijan Television (AzTV) went to the location to film the territories that Azerbaijan recaptured in the 2020 Nagorno-Karabakh War. On 4 June 2021, a Kamaz passenger bus carrying media representatives to the village of Susuzluq, Kalbajar region, hit an anti-tank mine.

As a result of the explosion, 3 persons died, 4 others received injuries of varying severity.

=== Deaths ===
- Siraj Abyshov, camera operator of the Azerbaijan television, was born on 29 August 29 in the city of Qubadli, Azerbaijan SSR. During the First Karabakh War, together with his family, he was displaced and moved to the city of Sumgait. In 2019, he started working for AzTV.
- Maharram Ibrahimov (Alioglu), reporter of the Azerbaijan State News Agency, was born on 16 April 1982 in the village of Ardanish, Krasnoselsky District, Armenian SSR. In 2003, he enrolled to the military service in the Internal Troops of the Ministry of Internal Affairs which he completed on 15 July 2004. Since 1 September 2004, he was a reporter of "AZERTAC". During the Second Karabakh War, he covered the events in the war zone.
- Arif Agalar oglu Aliyev, the Deputy Representative of the Head of the Executive Power of the Kalbajar region in the Susuzluq administrative-territorial district, was born in 1983 in the Susuzluq village. During the First Karabakh War, he was displaced to Khasabag village, Goygol region. He worked in this position since 2012. On 5 June 2021, his body will be delivered home to Goygol district, to be buried.

=== Wounded ===
- Emin Mammadov, a stage director of Azerbaijan TV. upon being contacted on the 4th of June he said that his condition was stable.

The other three victims have not been named. One of them is a bus driver, two others are villagers.

== Aftermath ==
After the initial spread in the media, the General Prosecutor's Office of the Republic of Azerbaijan and the Ministry of Internal Affairs of the Republic of Azerbaijan confirmed the news about the incident. The Military Prosecutors Office has initiated a criminal case under the Criminal Code.

Following the incident, the founder of the Tigran Mets special military training center, Lieutenant Colonel of the Armenian Armed Forces, Koryun Gumashyan, told the Armenian media in an interview that he and his men had planted 17 trucks of mines in Lachin and Kalbajar. He added that he was ready to provide Azerbaijan with maps of mined areas "in exchange for Armenian captives in Azerbaijan."

On the day of the incident, the Head of Press of the Ministry of Labour and Social Protection of the Population of Azerbaijan, Fazil Talibov, said that the victims will be given the status of martyrs.

== Reactions ==
=== Internal ===
The AzTV chairman, Rovshan Mammadov, among the first to confirm the incident on his Facebook page, called the incident "another example of Armenian vandalism and the enemies crimes against civilians" and expressed condolences to the families of both journalists. The First Vice-president of the Republic of Azerbaijan, Mehriban Aliyeva, stated that "the responsibility for the death of innocent people rests entirely with the military-political leadership of Armenia". Hikmet Hajiyev, the Assistant to the President of the Republic of Azerbaijan, and the Head of the Foreign Policy Department of the Presidential Administration of the Republic of Azerbaijan, called on the international organizations to show solidarity and condemn the tragedy, claiming that journalists were victims of a mine "deliberately planted by Armenian troops when leaving Kalbajar." The Head of the Press Service of the Ministry of Foreign Affairs of the Republic of Azerbaijan, Leyla Abdullayeva, the Minister of Foreign Affairs of Azerbaijan, Jeyhun Bayramov, the Azerbaijan Media Development Agency (MEDİA), expressed condolences to the families of the killed journalists. The Ministry of Foreign Affairs of Azerbaijan accused Armenia of violating the Geneva Convention. The Head of the Union of Journalists of Azerbaijan, Elchin Shikhli, accused Armenia of violating the international law and claimed that the mines were recently planted. The State Committee of the Republic of Azerbaijan on Family, Women and Children Issues stated that as a result of the incident, young children of three families were orphaned.

The victims were honoured near the building of the Azerbaijan TV.

=== International ===
The Ambassador of France to Azerbaijan, Zacharie Gross, the Embassy of Italy in Azerbaijan, the Ambassador of Israel to Azerbaijan, George Deek, the Embassy of Russia in Azerbaijan, the Embassy of Iran in Azerbaijan and the Embassy of Georgia in Azerbaijan expressed their condolences regarding the deaths of two journalists in the incident. The Turkish channel Haber Global blamed Armenia for the incident.

Georgy Gogia, the deputy director of the Human Rights Watch for Europe and Central Asia, noted that the event raises concern, especially if the mine was recently planted to target civilians. Dunja Mijatovic, Commissioner for Human Rights of the Council of Europe, declared the need to urgently clear the areas affected by the conflict from mines. The OSCE Representative on Media Freedom, Teresa Ribeiro, expressed a deep concern and sadness over the death of the two Azerbaijani journalists.

The Secretary General of the International Federation of Journalists, Anthony Bellanger, and the Secretary General of the European Federation of Journalists, Ricardo Gutierrez, in a joint statement expressed their condolences to the victims and their families, and also called on the Armenian authorities to hand over the plans of the mined areas". The International Media Institute said it was "deeply saddened" over the deaths of the two journalists. Gulnoza Said, Program Coordinator of the Committee to Protect Journalists for Europe and Central Asia, called the deaths of Ibrahimov and Abyshov "an unnecessary tragedy." She called on Armenian officials to share the "mine maps with the press to ensure that other journalists do not fall victims to the conflict".

The deputies of the Verkhovna Rada of Ukraine, Lyudmyla Marchenko and Maryan Zablotsky, demanded Armenia to provide the maps of the minefields. Igor Korotchenko, Russian journalist and former head of the Public Council under the Ministry of Defence of the Russian Federation, also reacted to the incident and stressed on the need to appeal to all organizations, including European, and international journalistic structures.

The killing of Siraj Abishov was condemned by the Director-General of the UNESCO Audrey Azoulay in a press-release published on the 7th of June. According to global monitoring on the safety of journalists by the Observatory of Killed journalist, Abishov the 2nd media professional killed Azerbaijan in 2021.
