= Bağırlı =

Bağırlı or Bagyrly may refer to:

- Bağırlı, Kalbajar, Azerbaijan
- Bağırlı, Shamakhi, Azerbaijan
