= Çanaqçı =

Çanaqçı or Chanakhchi or Chanakhchy or Chenakhchi may refer to:

- Chanakhchi, Armenia
- Zangakatun, Armenia
- Çanaqçı, Dashkasan, Azerbaijan
- Çanaqçı, Gadabay, Azerbaijan
- Çanaqçı, Khojali, Azerbaijan
