= AzTV =

State-controlled national television channel in Azerbaijan

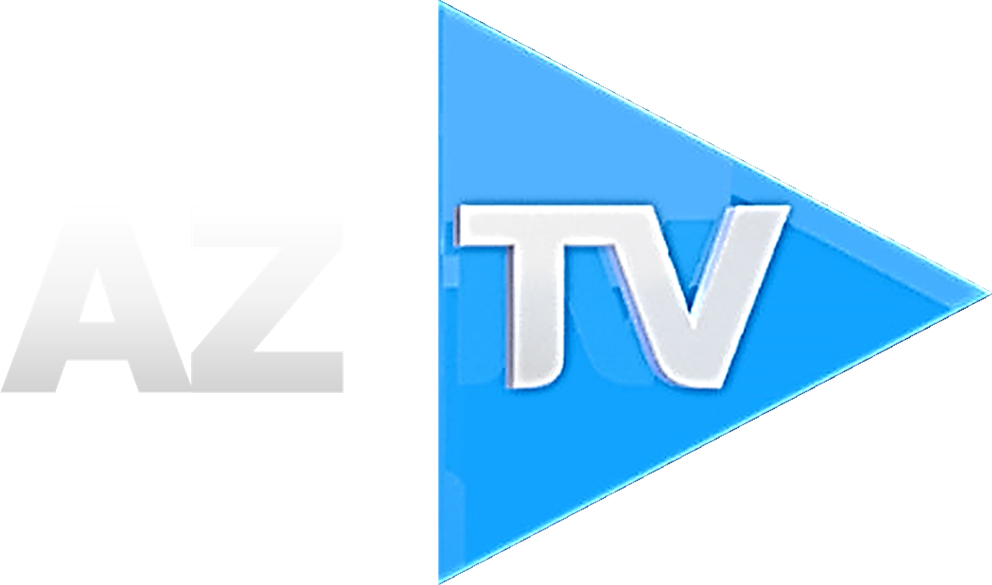
- AzTV logo since 2019
- Country: Azerbaijan
- Broadcast area: Azerbaijan; United States; UK; International

Programming
- Languages: Azerbaijani; Other languages of Azerbaijan
- Picture format: 16:9 1080i HDTV

Ownership
- Owner: Azerbaijan Television and Radio Broadcasting Closed Joint-stock Company (Government of Azerbaijan), (Parent Company AZCON Holding).
- Sister channels: İdman Azərbaycan TV, Mədəniyyət TV; AzTV 2 (1992–2005)

History
- Launched: 14 February 1956; 70 years ago
- Former names: Baku Television Studio (1956–1968); AzTV 1 (1996–2005)

Links
- Website: http://aztv.az/en

Availability

Terrestrial
- Digital terrestrial television: Varies within location

Streaming media
- AzTV.az: Watch live

AzTV or Azerbaijan Television (Azerbaijani: Azərbaycan Televiziyası) is a state-controlled national television station in Azerbaijan. It is the oldest television channel in the country, having first broadcast from Baku on 14 February 1956 in what was then the Azerbaijan Soviet Socialist Republic, Soviet Union. Since 2005, the channel has been operated by the Azerbaijan Television and Radio Broadcasting Closed Joint-stock Company.

== History ==
=== Beginning ===
Azerbaijan Television started its operation 30 years after Azerbaijani Radio - on February 14, 1956. The construction of the building for the television center in Baku began in 1954. The location for its construction was chosen at one of the highest places in Baku - Mehdi Huseyn 1. The building of the telecenter, which Azerbaijani builders and specialists built together with their colleagues from Moscow and Leningrad and equipped with the appropriate equipment, was handed over at the end of 1955. Until February 1956, test programs of the Baku studio were broadcast occasionally.

On the first day of the show, young actress Najiba Malikova appeared on the screen. Najiba Malikova, who opened with her "Göstərir Bakı!" (This is Baku!) speech, congratulated the audience on the occasion of the start of the television. On that day, the feature film "Bəxtiyar" was shown on the screen.

At first, the Baku studio aired a 2-hour program twice a week, then three days a week. At the first stage, since there were no specialists in the field of television, radio, newspaper and theater employees were invited to work here. Television had no understanding of programming, networks, and models. Therefore, the new mass media functioned as an image relay. Every day, the TV crew decided what to show the audience. The choice was not rich: concerts of classical and pop music, feature films, theater performances, interviews on socio-political topics, speeches of labor pioneers were shown, the announcer read short 15-minute news from newspapers. Since August 1956, Azerbaijani television began to broadcast 5 days a week, and the daily volume of programs was increased to 2 hours and 20 minutes. In 1962, the volume of daily aired programs increased to 7 hours. Since the 70s, the broadcast volume of daily programs and programs of Azerbaijan television has increased to 10 hours, and in the 80s to 18 hours. Since January 2005, television has switched to 24-hour continuous broadcasting.

=== The television studio ===
In 1956, the Baku television studio and the Radio Information Department operated separately. In October 1957, the television institution was removed from the Ministry of Culture, was merged with the Radio-Information Department and named the State Radio and Television Broadcasting Committee under the Council of Ministers of the Republic. In 1970, television received the status of State Television and Radio Broadcasting Committee. In 1991, the committee became a company. From June 2003, Nakhchivan Television, which is part of Azerbaijan State Television, began to operate as an independent broadcaster. Since 2005, by order of the President of Azerbaijan, the company has been transformed into "Azerbaijan Television and Radio Broadcasting" Closed Joint Stock Company.

By September 2, 1956, the Baku studio had already shown up to 100 feature films. Baku residents could watch the film magazines "Soviet Azerbaijan", "Science and Technology", "Foreign Chronicle", "Pioner" on television. Artists visiting our country from Moscow and other 13 republics of the USSR often performed from the Baku studio. In the first period, the Baku studio consisted of two rooms of 30 square meters. In one of the rooms divided in half, film equipment was installed, and in the other, performances of announcers and small music groups were broadcast. The studio had only one telecamera, as well as two cameras in the projection room for showing motion pictures and slides. One of the three cameras was for the announcer, or speaker, and the other two were for the film. When the camera in the studio was out of order, the announcer's description and text were provided from the projection room. On June 9, 1957, a football game was broadcast from the Republic Stadium for the first time. The report from the stadium was conducted by radio journalist Walid Sanani. On June 28, the student and youth festival was shown from that stadium. Live broadcasts were started from Azerbaijan State Academic National Drama Theater, Azerbaijan State Academic Opera and Ballet Theater, Azerbaijan State Philharmonic and other concert halls.

In 1958, eight-channel equipment was purchased from Leningrad (now St. Petersburg), which was considered a modern technical means for that time, and reconstruction works were started at the television center. From the mid-60s, new technology was introduced in the studios. The KMZI-4 video recording technique used in the shooting pavilion since 1965 made it possible to transfer performances to videotape. Until the 1970s, the lack of video equipment in the local airspace slowed down the development of television. Only in 1970-1972, after the filming was done with 16-millimeter film, news programs began to show reports. The improved "Kadr-2" video system, launched in 1971, created favorable conditions for editing.

Since 1970, Moscow television began broadcasting programs in color. Since 1973, Azerbaijani television has been able to switch to color broadcasting only in Baku. The introduction of the KADR-3R video recorder in the mid-70s created conditions for quality electronic assembly. In the 1970s and 1980s, video technology made its way to the airwaves.

In 1985, Azerbaijan Television reached the 4th place in the USSR due to its technical equipment, film production and appearances on Central TV with various programs.

During the period from 1981 to 1991, the most advanced technical means for that time made their way to the television space. The expansion of technical capabilities increased the quality of programs year by year, helped to find new forms. It was possible to shoot, edit, and broadcast directly through video cameras.

=== Early announcers ===
In May 1956, the first announcers appeared on the screen. Among them were Tamara Gözəlova, Nailə Mehdibəyova, Sevda Qənizadə, Sara Manafova, Rəna Nəsirova, Rəxşan Aslanova, Sima Xasıyeva and Nizami Məmmədov.

Later, a generation of talented announcers appeared on television: Roza Tağıyeva, Rafiq Hüseynov, Ofelya Sənani, Şərqiyyə Hüseynova, Sabir Ələsgərov, Hicran Hüseynov, Həqiqət Əsgərova, Natəvan Hacıyeva, Tamilla Ələkbərova, Davud Əhmədov, Gülşən Əkbərova, Nərgiz Cəlilova, Ülkər Quliyeva, Aygül Qaradağlı, Dilarə Səlim, Rafiq Həşimov and others.

=== The TV tower ===
In 1956, the construction of the TV tower was not yet completed. Until then, the transmitter of the Baku studio was installed in a 44-meter conventional oil well. In 1957, the tower with the height of 180 meters was commissioned. At that time, the broadcasts transmitted through the tower could be viewed only in the capital and its surroundings. In 1960, with the commissioning of the Baku-Aghstafa radio relay line, television rebroadcast stations began to operate in Goychay-Ganja-Aghstafa stations. As a result, it became possible to watch television in most regional centers and residential areas of Azerbaijan. In 1961, the launch of powerful television stations in Ganja, Goychay and Shusha made it possible to receive broadcasts from Baku in Goygol, Goranboy, Yevlakh, Mingachevir, Agjabedi and Nagorno-Karabakh. Thanks to the small television station established in Nakhchivan in January 1962, the population of the Autonomous Republic was able to watch television programs. The Nakhchivan studio, which was launched on March 12, 1963, began to show its programs to the local population through this station.

Increasing the program hours and applying advanced technology in the communication and telecommunication system required the construction of a new TV tower. In 1979, the Ministry of Communications began work on the construction of a 310-meter TV tower in Baku. The new TV tower, whose foundation was laid in 1981, was commissioned on June 7, 1996. Starting from February 2004, better quality broadcast of AzTV's programs was ensured in European countries. For this purpose, specialists of the Teleradio Production Union installed a new digital TV - Up-link station in the TV tower complex. Now the programs of Azerbaijani television are broadcast from that station to Europe through "Hot Bird", North America through "Galaxy 25", and Asia through "Azerspace-1" satellites.

In 2007, Azerbaijan Television was awarded the "European quality" medal for the technical relevance of broadcasting to Europe. It was broadcast in 16:9 aspect ratio on November 6, 2013. "Azerbaijan Television will fully switch to HD format from 2020. Necessary equipment has been purchased to broadcast programs from a new server system. This is a big milestone in the 63-year history of Azerbaijan Television. Rovshan Mammadov, the Chairman of the Azerbaijan Television and Radio Broadcasting Closed Joint-stock Company voiced these views at the next meeting of the Artistic Council. He noted that more than 10 editing computers were purchased for more effective preparation of programs.

It was also brought to attention that the programs "Baku s Nadejdoy" and "Hüquq və mən" will be aired in the near future. At the meeting, the members of the Artistic Council exchanged opinions, expressed their suggestions and comments on the programs shown on Azerbaijan Television, "Culture" channel and "Idman Azerbaijan TV". The next meeting of the Artistic Council was held in January 2020.

From May 31, 2021, Azerbaijan Television, Idman Azerbaijan TV and the "Culture" channel started broadcasting in HD.

This process, which requires a lot of funds, was carried out according to the order of President Ilham Aliyev on measures to strengthen the material and technical base of Azerbaijan Television and Radio Broadcasting Closed Joint Stock Company signed in 2019.

Elnur Alizadeh, Director of the Technical Production Unit of "Azerbaijan Television and Radio Broadcasting" CJSC, said that the technical staff worked hard for several days: "The technical staff worked very hard yesterday, today, throughout this process in general. Our goals are also after that. is to strengthen our technical base".

Chief engineer Yolchu Aliyev noted that this is just the beginning: "It was difficult because we have 3 channels, but the work to be done starts after that". On January 28, 2022, it switched to HD broadcast format on the "Azerspace-1" satellite.

=== Independence ===
The beginning of the Nagorno-Karabakh conflict during 1988 became a real test for Azerbaijani television. Since it operated under the control of the Communist Party and was not ready for the conflict that began within the USSR, Azerbaijan television could not establish an information policy. Azerbaijani television aired a short news about the non-stop rallies held by the separatists in Khankendi only 10 days later - with the permission of the government under the name "The situation in Karabakh". During the mass demonstrations that started in Baku, TV started broadcasting live from the square two days late. This became possible as a result of the opposition of the AzTV management to the will of Abdurrahman Vazirov, the first secretary of the Central Committee of the Communist Party of Azerbaijan. The employees of the Azerbaijani television, together with the people, opposed Gorbachev's steps and demanded compliance with the Constitution of Azerbaijan, international legal norms, and the prevention of illegal actions of Armenian separatists. The political commentators speaking on Azerbaijan television boldly expressed the essence of the Kremlin's policy against Azerbaijan, the uncontrollable socio-political situation that has arisen in our republic, and the rightful demands of the people. The emissaries from Moscow promised through Azerbaijani television that the Kremlin would not send troops to Baku and declare a state of emergency.

It was possible to restore the broadcasting of Azerbaijani television only on January 28. Announcer Rafig Huseynov, appearing on the air in a black suit and without a tie, expressed his condolences to the people of Azerbaijan regarding the killing of 138 civilians.

But since the television operates under the control of the Soviet Army, only the information, programs and programs "cut" by the military censor were aired. This situation continued until September 1991. After the KKCP in Moscow, President Ayaz Mutallibov lost the support of the Soviet Army, and the transformation of republics into independent states in the post-Soviet space became an unstoppable process.

On October 18, 1991, Azerbaijani declared independence. Azerbaijan TV turned from a provincial TV channel into the main television of an independent state.

== Organization ==
The channel has been owned since 2005 by the Azerbaijan Television and Radio Broadcasting Closed Joint-stock Company (Azerbaijani: Azərbaycan Televiziya və Radio Verilişləri Qapalı Səhmdar Cəmiyyəti), of which the national government is the only shareholder. This company also owns the channels İdman Azərbaycan TV (Sport Azerbaijan TV) and Mədəniyyət TV (Culture TV).

In 2007, an application by AzTV to join the European Broadcasting Union was rejected after the channel was found to be too closely associated with the ruling government.

== Programming ==
The channel starts its daily broadcast by airing National Anthem of Azerbaijan. Programming on AzTV primarily consists of news, talk shows, documentaries, music shows, and feature films.

== Technology ==
Their 1st shows (including music videos) that were recorded in 1956 are stored on film. In 1965, the studio switched to using videotape recording since it became affordable and the quality of their produced shows (including music videos) increased. AzTV maintains a huge archive of all their saved TV programming that was recorded from 1956–present. All of their shows are preserved on different film and videotape formats.

== Broadcast area ==
As of March 2014, 99.96% of the population of Azerbaijan can receive AzTV via terrestrial, cable, or satellite broadcasting, giving it the largest coverage area of any Azerbaijani television channel.

In addition to broadcasting domestically, AzTV broadcasts internationally on the internet and via free-to-air satellite to Europe, North America, and portions of North Africa, the Middle East, and Central Asia.
