= Suruk =

Suruk may refer to:

- Şürük, Azerbaijan
- Suruk, Iran
- Suruc, southern Turkey
