= Idman Azerbaijan TV =

İdman TV (Sport TV)
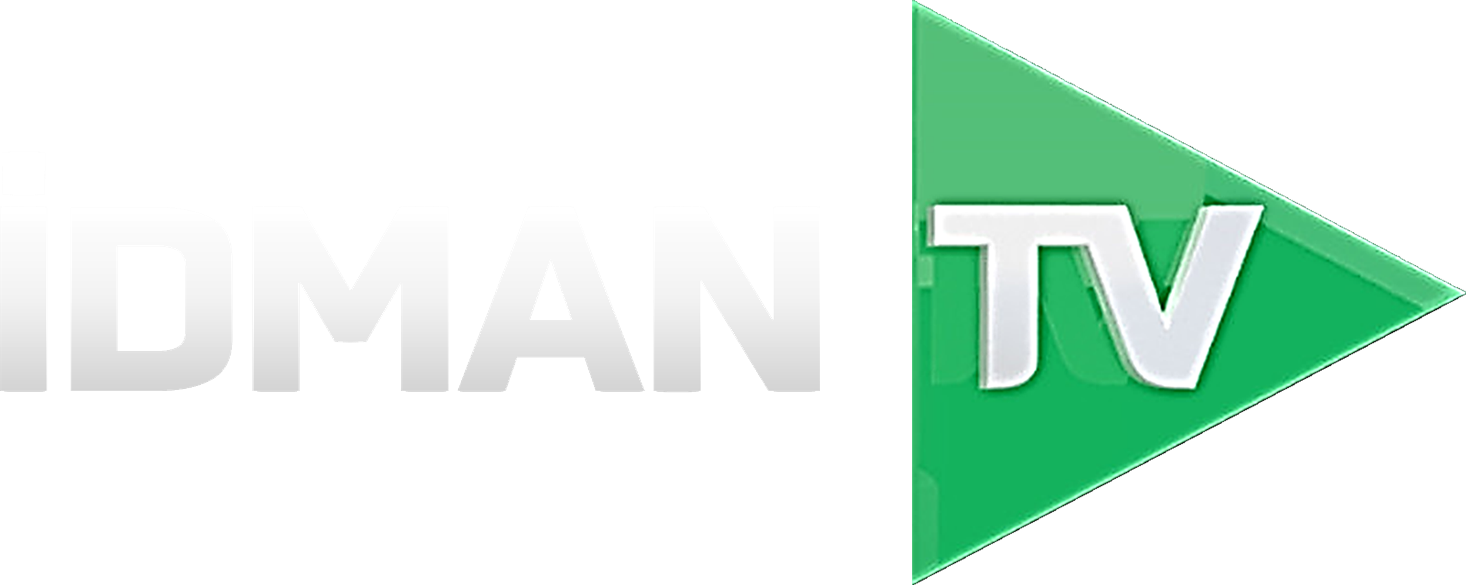
- Country: Azerbaijan

Programming
- Picture format: 16:9 1080i HDTV

Ownership
- Owner: Azerbaijan Television and Radio Broadcasting Closed Joint-stock Company (Government of Azerbaijan)
- Sister channels: AzTV, Mədəniyyət TV

History
- Launched: 1 January 2009; 17 years ago

Links
- Website: www.idmantv.az

Idman TV (Azerbaijani: İdman TV, "Sport TV") is a state-controlled television channel in Azerbaijan. It began broadcasting from Baku on 1 January 2009 and primarily airs live sporting events and sport-related programming.

The channel is owned by the Azerbaijan Television and Radio Broadcasting Closed Joint-stock Company (Azerbaijani: Azərbaycan Televiziya və Radio Verilişləri Qapalı Səhmdar Cəmiyyəti), of which the Government of Azerbaijan is the only shareholder. This company also owns the channels AzTV and Mədəniyyət TV (Culture TV).

Idman TV channel, satellite and internet broadcasts are partially interrupted due to international sports rights. It is valid in terrestrial and cable broadcasts in Azerbaijan. When there is a match on the Azerspace-1 satellite, the BISS is encrypted from the satellite. All programs are available on terrestrial and cable television broadcasts in Azerbaijan.
