= General Rzayev =

General Rzayev may refer to:

- Dadash Rzayev (born 1935), Azerbaijani Armed Forces major general
- Rail Rzayev (1945–2009), Azerbaijani Air Force general
- Zaur Rzayev (1958–2010), Azerbaijani Armed Forces major general
