= Alexander Gnezdov =

Azerbaijani footballer and manager

Personal information
- Full name: Alexander Efimovich Gnezdov
- Date of birth: 17 September 1908
- Place of birth: Gorokhovetsky Uyezd, Vladimir Governorate, Russian Empire
- Date of death: 1981 (aged 72–73)
- Position: Forward

Senior career*
Years	Team	Apps	(Gls)
1926–1927	Progress Baku		
1934–1936	Stalinets Leningrad	10	(6)
1937	Neftyanik	11	(3)
Total		21	(9)

Managerial career
- 1937: Neftyanik
- * Club domestic league appearances and goals

Alexander Efimovich Gnezdov (Russian: Гнездов Александр Ефимович; 17 September 1908 – 1981) was an Azerbaijani professional football manager and former player who played as a forward. He was known as the first manager of Neftçi PFK.

== Career ==
Gnezdov started his career at Progress Baku in 1926. Progress Baku was the first professional football club of Azerbaijan and founded in 1907. Then he joined Stalinets Leningrad (nowadays Zenit Saint Petersburg) in 1934, where he made ten appearances for the club, scoring six goals in total.

In 1937, Gnezdov was appointed the first coach at Neftyanik (nowadays Neftçi PFK), while he also played as a forward for the same club which was founded on 18 March 1937 and played under the name of Neftyanik until 1968. During his coaching period, the club was mainly consisted of players with Russian descent due to less interest to football among the local people. Despite his managerial status, Gnezdov was also considered a decisive player, especially in important and game-changing situations.

Gnezdov was the first person in Azerbaijan SSR who did punditry work. In 1949, he made history, filing Azerbaijan's first football report on radio.
