= Zaur Rzayev =

Azerbaijani military officer

- Native name: Zadir Rza oğlu Rzayev
- Born: Zadir Rza oglu Rzayev; October 10, 1937 (age 88); Şürük, Lankaran, Azerbaijani SSR, Soviet Union
- Died: January 29, 2010 (aged 72) Baku, Azerbaijan
- Allegiance: Red Army (1962–1991); Azerbaijani Armed Forces (1991–1993)
- Branch: Soviet Army; Azerbaijani Land Forces
- Service years: 1962–1993
- Rank: Major general
- Commands: 701st Motorized Rifle Brigade
- Conflicts: First Nagorno-Karabakh War
- Education: Baku Higher Combined Arms Command School; M. V. Frunze Military Academy

Zadir Rza oglu Rzayev (Azerbaijani: Zadir Rza oğlu Rzayev), known as Zaur Rzayev (10 October 1937 – 29 January 2010), was an Azerbaijani military officer, Major General of the Azerbaijani Armed Forces. He had served as the commander of the first Azerbaijani military unit created on the basis of Military Unit 18110 of the former Soviet Army, deputy commander of the 2nd Army Corps, front commander and the first deputy minister of defence during the First Nagorno-Karabakh War.

== Life and service ==
=== Early years ===
Zadir Rza oglu Rzayev was born on 10 October 1937 in Şürük, Lankaran District of the Azerbaijani SSR, then Soviet Union. In 1955, he entered the faculty of physics and mathematics of the Azerbaijan Pedagogical University, but dropped out of the university due to his family's economic difficulties. He studied at the Baku Higher Combined Arms Command School from 1958 to 1962, and graduated from there with honors.

=== Red Army ===
In 1962, he was promoted to lieutenant and sent to serve in the Red Army stationed in East Germany. Rzayev then entered the Frunze Military Academy in Moscow in 1971 and graduated in 1975. From there he was sent to the Transcaucasian Military District as a deputy regiment commander, and later to Baku as a deputy head of the military department of Baku State University to train Azerbaijani officers. Rzayev, who rose to the rank of colonel, was appointed head of the department.

=== First Nagorno-Karabakh War ===
On 9 October 1991, Rzayev went to the frontline of the First Nagorno-Karabakh War as the commander of the first military brigade of the Azerbaijani Armed Forces, known as the "First Battalion", which he created on his own initiative. In 1992, he led the liberation of 12 villages in Aghdara and 40 in Lachin, as well as a successful counter-offensive in Beylagan and Fuzuli as a corps commander. Rzayev was awarded the rank of major general by the decree of the Azerbaijani President Abulfaz Elchibey on 19 October 1992. He was called to Baku in November of that year and was appointed deputy commander of the 2nd Army Corps. Rzayev was later appointed the front commander and first deputy Minister of Defence on 16 June 1993.

Rzayev was seriously injured in a car accident in Beylagan on 29 August 1993 and was treated in a military hospital for 3 months. Zaur Rzayev died on 29 January 2010 at the age of 72.
