= 701st Motorized Rifle Brigade =

- Azerbaijani: 701 saylı Motoatıcı Briqada
- Active: 9 October 1991
- Country: Azerbaijan
- Branch: Azerbaijani Land Forces
- Part of: 1st Army Corps
- Nicknames: "Shikhov Battalion" "The First Battalion"
- Engagements: First Nagorno-Karabakh War: Battle of Kalbajar; Operation Kalbajar

Commanders
- Notable commanders: Colonel Zaur Rzayev; Colonel Azizaga Ganizade

The 701st Motorized Rifle Brigade (Azerbaijani: 701 saylı Motoatıcı Briqada) is a military unit of the Azerbaijani Land Forces. It was the first unit to be founded in the Azerbaijani Armed Forces and took part in the First Nagorno-Karabakh War.

== History ==
On 9 October 1991, the Supreme Council of the Armed Forces decided to establish Military Unit 18110 from a former settlement of the Soviet Army. he core of the military unit was formed by graduates of the Jamshid Nakhchivanski Military Lyceum. During the war, Kalbajar was defended by the 701st brigade, then the 701st brigade was sent to Lachin region for combat operations. After the occupation of Agdara/Martakert by the Armenian Army in mid-February 1993, the Kalbajar Region was defenseless. During the large-scale attack of the enemy forces up to 6 regiments to Kalbajar region from 3 directions, the 701st brigade was still fighting in Lachin Region. Many blamed the unit for the occupation of this region. The 701st Brigade was stationed and defended in the Kalbajar region from May to September 1992; In early September 1992, the 701st Brigade was unexpectedly sent to Lachin for combat operations.

When the Kalbajar Region was 80% occupied by the enemy and the Ministry of Defense ordered the 701st Brigade to withdraw from its positions in Lachin in the direction of Kalbajar to a village on foot, in an offensive known as Operation Kalbajar. The units of the 701st Brigade gradually entered the Kalbajar region, where all the heights were occupied by the enemy in a ring for several days. Fighting in unequal conditions, the 701st Brigade fought in a siege and saved the people of Kalbajar region, killing 400 soldiers.

== Command staff ==
- Unit Commander - Colonel Zaur Rzayev
- Chief of Staff - Lieutenant-Colonel Zafarshah Suleymanov
- Commander of the Rear - Lieutenant-Colonel Zakir Rahimov
- Chief of Operational Unit - Lieutenant-Colonel Gazanfar Mammadov
- Chief of the Personnel Department - Senior Lieutenant Rahim Farajov
- Assistant to the Chief of the Personnel Department - Lieutenant Ilgar Gayibov
- Chief of Service - Major Zeynalabdin Asgarov
- Chief of Communication Service - Captain Mubariz Fataliyev
- Chief of Automobile Service - Lieutenant Mammadmirza Rzayev
- Chief of Medical Service - Captain Ahliman Aliyev
- Chief of Topographic Service - Lieutenant Vagif Gurbanov
- Chief of Commodity Service - Senior Lieutenant Firuz Mursalov
- Chief of Food Service - Natalig Abdullayev
- Financial Service Chief - Lieutenant Qırımxan Hajiyev
- Fuel Service Chief - Lieutenant Rafig Huseynov
- Engineer Service Chief - Lieutenant Valeh Najafov
- Sports and Physical Training Chief - Lieutenant Rauf Baylarov
- Director of the Military Band - Major Eduard Ismailov
- Detachment Commander - Lieutenant Mubariz Khanbutayev
- Adjutant - Rashid Mammadov

== Decorated servicemen ==
Personnel of the brigade, were awarded various honorary titles and prizes. 4 people were awarded the title of "National Hero of Azerbaijan", 11 people were awarded the "Azerbaijan Flag" order, and 18 people were awarded the "For Courage" medal.

== War Veterans Council ==
The Public Union of Veterans of Military Unit 701 was established by Zaur Rzayev to honor the service of the military unit during the Karabakh war. Its headquarters is at the War Veterans council building on Zarifa Aliyeva Avenue in Baku.
