= Rafig Huseynov (announcer) =

- Rafiq Eyyub oğlu Hüseynov
- Born: Rafig Eyyub oglu Huseynov; August 4, 1946; Shusha, NKAO, Azerbaijani SSR, Soviet Union
- Died: October 26, 2017 (aged 71); Düsseldorf, Germany
- Resting place: Yasamal District
- Education: Azerbaijan State Institute of Arts
- Father: Eyyub Huseynov

Rafig Eyyub oglu Huseynov (Azerbaijani: Rafiq Eyyub oğlu Hüseynov; 1946 – 2017) was a Soviet–Azerbaijani TV announcer, host, actor and singer. He received the honorary title of the People's Artist of the Azerbaijani SSR in 1990, and was awarded the State Prize of the Azerbaijani SSR in 1991.

== Early life ==
Rafig Eyyub oglu Huseynov was born on 4 August 1946, in Shusha of the Nagorno-Karabakh Autonomous Oblast, the Azerbaijani SSR, which was then part of the Soviet Union. Born into a merchant family, he grew up in Baku, and lost his father at an early age. Huseynov entered the Azerbaijan State Institute of Arts and graduated from there in 1976.

== Career ==
Huseynov worked as an illuminator at the State Committee for Radio and Television Broadcasting under the Council of Ministers of the Azerbaijani SSR from July 1964. He worked as an announcer from January 1966. Later, Huseynov worked as deputy chairman of the Azerbaijan State Television and Radio Broadcasting Company.

Hosting numerous shows on the Azerbaijani television, including the news program, as well as many interviews and on-screen concerts, he was distinguished by recognizable timbre of voice, peculiar manner of broadcasting, and had played an active role in the formation of the Azerbaijani television. Thus, he was called the Azerbaijani Leviathan by some. In the early 1990s, Huseynov, as an announcer, had provided information about the Black January and the Nagorno-Karabakh conflict. Though Huseynov left the television in the early 1990s, and continued his career as a singer. He returned to television in 2005, taking the post of artistic director of the TV presenter of the AzTV.

He died on 26 October 2017, in Düsseldorf, Germany. He was buried in the Yasamal Cemetery of Baku on 3 November 2017, after a farewell ceremony at the Rashid Behbudov State Song Theatre.

== Awards ==
- Honored Artist of the Azerbaijani SSR. (1979)
- People's Artist of the Azerbaijani SSR. (1990)
- State Prize of the Azerbaijani SSR. (1991)
