= Hikmet Hajiyev =

Azerbaijan foreign policy advisor

- Hikmət Hacıyev
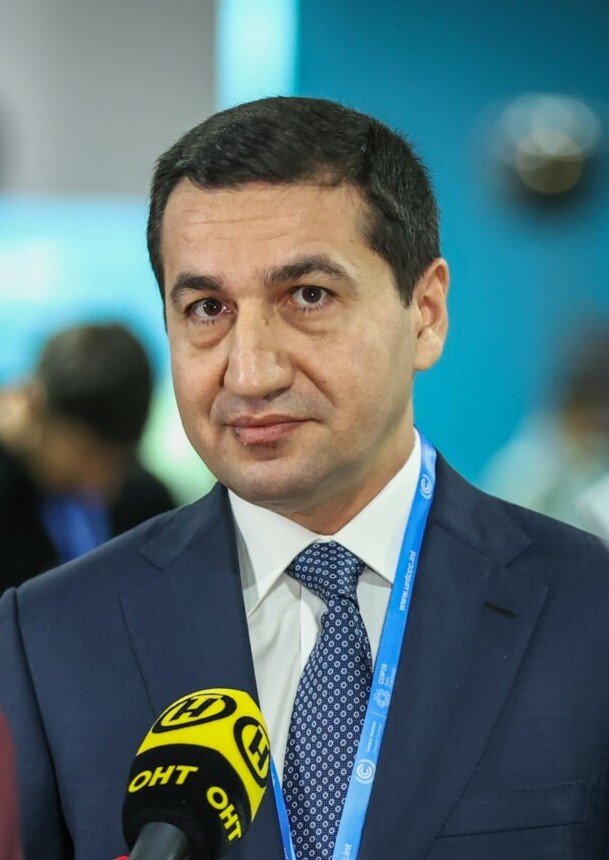
- Hajiyev in November 2024

Assistant to the President of Azerbaijan
- Incumbent
- Assumed office 29 November 2019
- President: Ilham Aliyev

Head of the Foreign Policy Affairs Department of the Presidential Administration
- Incumbent
- Assumed office 26 November 2018
- President: Ilham Aliyev
- Preceded by: Novruz Mammadov

Head of the Press Service of the Ministry of Foreign Affairs
- In office 19 September 2014 – 18 September 2018
- Minister: Elmar Mammadyarov
- Preceded by: Elman Abdullayev
- Succeeded by: Leyla Abdullayeva

Personal details
- Born: 15 October 1979 (age 46) Kirovabad, Azerbaijan SSR, USSR

Hikmet Farhad oglu Hajiyev (Azerbaijani: Hikmət Fərhad oğlu Hacıyev; born 15 October 1979) is an Azerbaijani politician who serves as the Assistant to the President of Azerbaijan since 2019 and as the Head of Foreign Policy Affairs Department of the Presidential Administration since 2018.

== Early life and diplomatic career ==
Hajiyev was born in 1979 in Ganja (then known as Kirovabad) and graduated from Secondary School No. 24. He graduated from the Faculty of International Relations and International Law at Baku State University. He also holds a master's degree from NATO's Defense College, the George C. Marshall European Center for Security Studies, and Université libre de Bruxelles. Hajiyev has worked in the system of the Ministry of Foreign Affairs since 2000. In different years, he worked at Azerbaijani representative offices in NATO, Kuwait, and Egypt. From 2014 to 2018, Hajiyev served as the head of the Press Service of the Ministry of Foreign Affairs. On 9 July 2018, he was awarded the Medal for Distinguished Service in Diplomatic Service, and a year later, he was awarded the Order of Merit for Service to the Fatherland of the 2nd degree.

== Foreign policy advisor ==
On 18 September 2018, he was appointed Deputy Head of the Foreign Policy Department of the Presidential Administration. Later that November, he became the head of this department and on 29 November 2019, he became an official assistant to the President. When describing his role in the administration during the July 2020 Armenian–Azerbaijani clashes, President Aliyev said that he is "speaking with my assistant Hikmet Hajiyev probably 10 times a day".

On August 24, 2026, President of Ukraine Volodymyr Zelenskyy awarded Hikmet Hajiyev the Order "For Merit" III degree.
