= Leyla Abdullayeva =

Azerbaijani diplomat

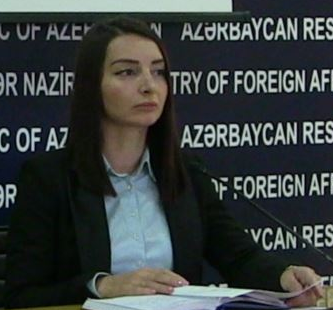

Ambassador of Azerbaijan to the French Republic
- Incumbent
- Assumed office October 17, 2022

Head of the Press Service of the Ministry of Foreign Affairs
- In office 18 September 2018 – 17 October 2022
- Minister: Elmar Mammadyarov; Jeyhun Bayramov
- Preceded by: Hikmet Hajiyev
- Succeeded by: Ayhan Hajizade

Personal details
- Born: 1981 (age 44–45) Baku, Azerbaijan SSR, USSR
- Citizenship: Soviet Union; Azerbaijan
- Education: Baku State University
- Occupation: diplomat
- Awards

Leyla Yashar gizi Abdullayeva (Azerbaijani: Leyla Yaşar qızı Abdullayeva, 1981, Baku) is an Azerbaijani diplomat, the Ambassador of Azerbaijan to the French Republic and former Head of the Press Service of Azerbaijan's Ministry of Foreign Affairs.

== Biography ==
Leyla Abdullayeva was born in 1981 in Baku. She studied at Baku State University, Faculty of International Law and International Relations, completing bachelor's and master's degrees in international relations.

Since 2002, Abdullayeva has held diplomatic positions in various departments of the Foreign Ministry, in the Representations of the Republic of Azerbaijan to NATO, the Embassy of Azerbaijan in the Kingdom of Belgium and the European Union. She formerly worked at the Foreign Ministry as deputy director of the Azerbaijan International Development Agency (AIDA).

On October 4, 2018, Leyla Abdullayeva was appointed Head of the Press Service of the Ministry of Foreign Affairs of Azerbaijan.

On October 17, 2022, she was named Azerbaijan's ambassador to the French Republic.

== Awards ==
- Medal "For Distinction in Diplomatic Service" — July 9, 2018
