= Çanaqçı, Dashkasan =

Çanaqçı
- Municipality
- Location within Azerbaijan
- Coordinates: 40°24′47″N 46°07′56″E
- Country: Azerbaijan
- Rayon: Dashkasan

Population
  - Total: 420
- Time zone: UTC+4 (AZT)
  - Summer (DST): UTC+5 (AZT)

Çanaqçı (also spelled Çanaxçı, Chanakhchi, Chanakhchy, and Chenakhchi) is a village and municipality in the Dashkasan Rayon of Azerbaijan. It has a population of 420. The municipality includes the villages of Çanaqçı and Zivlan.
