= Bağırlı, Shamakhi =

Bağırlı
- Municipality
- Location within Azerbaijan
- Coordinates: 40°27′42″N 48°35′59″E
- Country: Azerbaijan
- Rayon: Shamakhi

Population
  - Total: 1,963
- Time zone: UTC+4 (AZT)
  - Summer (DST): UTC+5 (AZT)

Bağırlı (also, Bagirovka, Bagirovkend, Bagry, and Bagyrly) is a village and municipality in the Shamakhi Rayon of Azerbaijan. It has a population of 1,963.
