= Rovshan Mammadov =

Azerbaijani journalist

- Rövşən Raqif oğlu Məmmədov
- Born: June 15, 1979 (age 47); Aghstafa, Azerbaijan SSR, Soviet Union
- Other name: Rovshan Ragifoglu
- Education: Baku State University; Baku Slavic University
- Occupation: Journalist
- Years active: 2000–
- Television: Lider TV, ANS TV, AzTV
- Title: Chairman of the Azerbaijan Television and Radio Broadcasting CJSC
- Term: 2019–
- Predecessor: Arif Alishanov
- Children: 2
- Father: Ragif Mammadov

Rovshan Ragif oglu Mammadov (Azerbaijani: Rövşən Raqif oğlu Məmmədov), also known as Rovshan Ragifoglu (Azerbaijani: Rövşən Raqifoğlu; born 1979) is an Azerbaijani journalist who currently serves as the chairman of the Azerbaijan Television and Radio Broadcasting CJSC.

== Early years ==
Rovshan Ragif oglu Mammadov was born on 15 June 1979, in the city of Aghstafa in the Azerbaijan SSR, which was then part of the Soviet Union. From 1985 to 1996, he studied at secondary school No. 24 in Sumgayit. Mammadov entered the Journalism Faculty of Baku State University in 1996 and graduated with a bachelor's degree in 2000. He studied at the Department of International Journalism of the same faculty since 2000, graduating in 2002 with a master's degree. From 2003 to 2006, Mammadov studied at the Department of Theory and Practice of Journalism of the same faculty and received a postgraduate degree. From 2009 to 2016, he studied at the Department of Philology and Journalism of Baku Slavic University. In 2016, he defended his doctoral dissertation on "Azerbaijani Diaspora Press and National Ideology in Europe (Germany, France, Turkey, England) during Independence" and received a doctorate in philology.

== Career ==
=== Journalism ===
Rovshan Mammadov worked at Lider TV for many years and started his career as a sports correspondent in 200. He later worked as a reporter and sports commentator. In 2010, he was the head of the sports department of Lider TV. Rovshan Mammadov parted ways with Lider TV in 2015 and continued his activities in the political sphere.

Mammadov started working on AzTV, and hosted "Pulse of the Day", "Main Issue" and "Week" programs. He was later appointed director of the "Socio-political programs and foreign news studio" of Azerbaijan Television and Radio Broadcasting CJSC. On 15 January 2019, he was appointed the chairman of the same company.

=== Lecturing ===
Rovshan Mammadov had worked as a lecturer at Baku Slavic University, Baku Eurasian University, Academy of Public Administration Under the President of the Republic of Azerbaijan. He is also the author of several textbooks.

=== Scientific activity ===
Rovshan Mammadov's first scientific book, Azerbaijani Diaspora and the National Press was published in 2004. He later published the books Azerbaijani Diaspora in Europe and Leading Journalist in 2013. He had authored dozens of scientific articles in Azerbaijani, English and Russian languages, and had participated in international conferences.

== Personal life ==
Apart from his native Azerbaijani, he is fluent in Russian and English. He is married and has two children.

== Awards ==
- Mammadov was awarded the Taraggi Medal on 20 July 2015, by the decree of the President of Azerbaijan, Ilham Aliyev.
