= Radio in Azerbaijan =

Azerbaijan Radio — was a state-controlled national radio broadcaster that operated from 1926 to 1956. In 1956, it was merged into the Azerbaijan Television and Radio Broadcasting enterprise. It was the first radio service to air programs in the Azerbaijani language.

== History ==
On November 6, 1926, the words “Speaks Baku!” were heard from radio loudspeakers. On May 13, 1928, the Charter of Radio was confirmed by the Council of People's Commissioners. In 1957, the Radio-Information Office and Baku Studio were unified. The Committee of Radio and Television Programs was established under the Council of Ministers of the Azerbaijan SSR. In 2005, by the Decree of the President of the Republic of Azerbaijan, the Closed Joint-Stock Company “Programs of Azerbaijan Television and Radio” was established on the basis of the State Telecommunication and Radio Broadcasting Company.

Initially, Baku studio operated in 3 rooms on the third floor of the main building of the Azerbaijan National Academy of Sciences. The first studio was the central point of the urban broadcasting network. The studio was equipped with large lamps throughout the wall. The second room was the entrance to the studio, where those who were invited to go on-air waited. A small boat sat on the left. From this cabin, a small window was opened to see and control the inside of the studio. The apparatus featured a chimney in front of the window and united the studio's microphone and the transmission line. The middle of the studio hosted a Steinway Royal piano, with chairs near the walls.

In 1930, 269 radio stations operated in the country, growing to 20,409 by 1932. Radio began to play a role in development culture. In 1936, as a result of the launch of a 35-kilowatt radio station, transmissions of Azerbaijani radio were heard in the Caucasus, Uzbekistan, Turkmenistan and on the east coast of the Black Sea.

In December 1931, H. Javid's play Sheikh Sanan was first broadcast.

At the end of 1940, the number of radio stations in the country reached 51,000. Local radio programs were established in 32 districts. In 1941, radio broadcasts were broadcast in Turkey and Iran. In July 1941, Azerbaijani radio created programs in Turkish and Persian. Adil Efendiyev headed the editorial programs in Turkish, while Ghulam Mammadli was responsible for broadcasting in Persian.

In 1951, Azerbaijanis living abroad gained access to programs in the Azerbaijani language were broadcast daily for one hour. In the 1950s, Mukhtar Hajiyev headed this edition. In 1959, broadcasting in Arabic was launched.

Magnetic tape entered production work in 1953, It opened a new stage in the development of theater on radio. During this period J. Jabbarli's "Almaz" and "1905", Narimanov's "Bahadir and Sona", S. Rahimov's "Mehman", M. Ordubadi's "Sword and pen", N. Gogol's "Inspector", Hacibeyov's musical comedy "Arshin mal alan", and N. Hikmet's "Skull" were also broadcast.

In 1961, stations launched in Ganja, Goychay and Shusha. The first speaker was Ismail Alibekov, a student at the Azerbaijan Polytechnic Institute. Raya Imanzade was the first female speaker. Later speakers included Fatma Jabbarova, Zuleika Hajiyeva, Gultekin Jabbarly, Aydin Garadagli, Nizami Mamedov, Sabutai Guliyev and Ramiz Mustafayev.

Later, Pushkin's "Boris Godunov", J. Mammadguluzade's "The Dead", J. Jabbarli's "Aydin", "1905", "Yasar", "Sevil”, W. Shakespeare's "Hamlet", Akhundov's "Haji Qara", and performances of A.Hagverdiyev's "The Scattered Thoughts" were presented.

== Timeline ==
- On April 22, 1925, the Council of People's Commissars of Azerbaijan decided to build a broadband radio station in Baku with a coverage of 600 cubic meters.
- On May 13, 1928, the Council of People's Commissars of Azerbaijan approved the Radio Regulations.
- In April 1932, the Broadcasting Authority was taken from the Central Executive Committee and subordinated to the Council of People's Commissars.
- On July 5, 1932, Azerbaijan decided to establish the Central Broadcasting Committee.
- On May 5, 1933, the Committee on Radio and Television was established in the Council of People's Commissars of Azerbaijan.
- In August 1939, the Committee on Radio and Television became the Radio Information Committee.
- In 1953, the Broadcasting Committee was subordinated to the Ministry of Culture and was renamed the Department of Radio Information of the Ministry of Culture.
- In 1957, the Radio Information Directorate and the Baku Television Studio were merged, and the Committee on Radio and Television under the Council of Ministers of the Azerbaijan SSR was created.
- In 1970, the State Committee for Radio Broadcasting and Television was established.
- In 1991, the State Committee for Television and Radio Broadcasting became a company.
- In 2005, by the decree of Azerbaijani President Ilham Aliyev, the closed joint-stock company Azerbaijan Television and Radio was established on the basis of the State Television and Radio Broadcasting Company.

== See also ==
- AzTV
