= Chanakhchi, Armenia =

Chanakhchi
- Location within Armenia Location within Syunik Province
- Coordinates: 39°17′N 46°23′E
- Country: Armenia
- Marz (Province): Syunik
- Time zone: UTC+4 ( )
  - Summer (DST): UTC+5 ( )

Chanakhchi (also, Ch’anakhch’i) is a town in the Syunik Province of Armenia.

== See also ==
- Syunik Province
