= Nakhchivan TV =

Nakhchivan Television
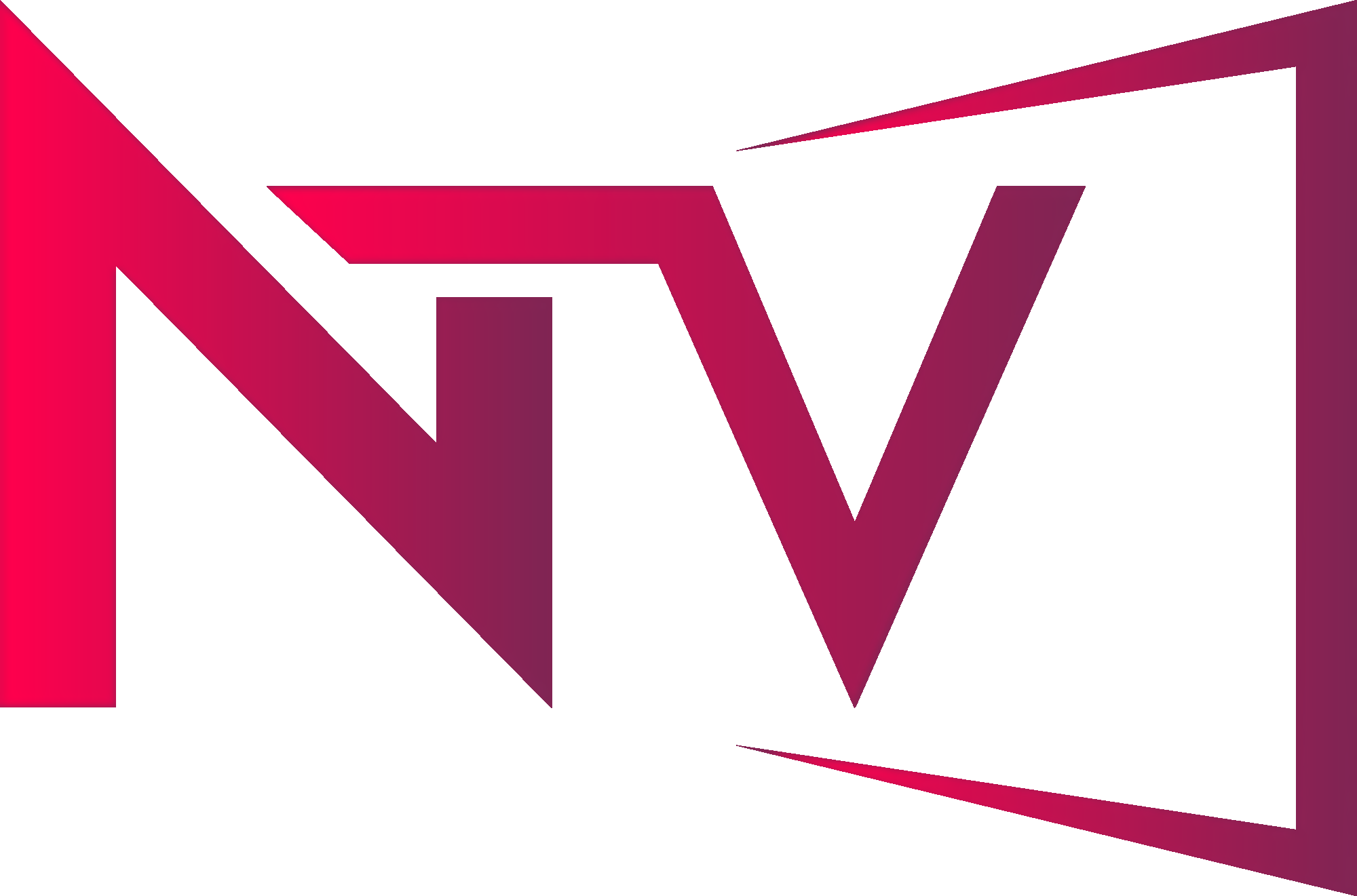
- Type: Regional television
- Country: Azerbaijan
- Broadcast area: Nakhchivan Autonomous Republic
- Headquarters: Nakhchivan, Azerbaijan

Programming
- Language(s): Azerbaijani; Russian; English
- Picture format: 1080i HDTV

Ownership
- Owner: Government of Azerbaijan
- Parent: State Committee for Television and Radio Broadcasting of the Nakhchivan Autonomous Republic

History
- Launched: 12 March 1963; 62 years ago

Links
- Website: ntv.az

Nakhchivan Television (Azerbaijani: Naxçıvan Televiziyası), also known as Nakhchivan TV or NTV for short, is an Azerbaijani regional terrestrial television channel owned and operated by the State Committee for Television and Radio Broadcasting of the Nakhchivan Autonomous Republic. It broadcasts from and serves the Nakhchivan Autonomous Republic, going on the air in 1963 as the first regional television channel in the country.

== History ==
Nakhchivan Television began broadcasting on 12 March 1963 when the autonomous republic was under Soviet rule, starting with a brief news bulletin. Later on 14 August, the Nakhichevan MSSR State Television and Radio Broadcasting Committee was founded. Television broadcasting in Nakhchivan at the time was limited, with poor equipment and only one editor-in-chief. The station was solely broadcast in the city of Nakhchivan until 1969.

After Heydar Aliyev was elected president of Azerbaijan in 1993, Nakhchivan Television underwent massive changes, with facilities being upgraded and more than ten substations being established in the autonomous republic. This helped with the spread of the television station to be broadcast in most regions of the republic. In 2003, it was split from AzTV.

Nakhchivan TV began broadcasting in high definition in 2015. It also migrated completely to digital terrestrial television after the termination of analog television in the republic in February 2015. Nakhchivan TV began simulcasting its broadcasts worldwide over the internet on 17 October 2016, the same day when the channel launched its website. It also began broadcasting on certain Turkish websites in January 2017.

Newscasts in the English language commenced on 28 November 2017. It later began broadcasting news in the Russian language as well on 7 August 2018. On 17 March 2021, the autonomous republic's supreme assembly chairman Vasif Talibov signed the decree on the establishment of the Nakhchivan Autonomous Republic Television and Radio Broadcasting closed joint stock company, which went into effect on 1 April. Nakhchivan TV became a part of this company.

Former logo of Nakhchivan TV

On 20 February 2023, Nakhchivan TV temporarily went off the air on local digital terrestrial television as a part of renovations and technical updates, although broadcasts online remained intact. It later resumed broadcasts on 22 February on UHF channel 36, with broadcasts on UHF channel 41 being suspended. The channel, along with its sister Nakhchivan Radio, were added to the list of state-owned entities carrying out audiovisual terrestrial broadcasting on 15 August 2024 following a decree signed by Azerbaijani president Ilham Aliyev. A license allowing the station to broadcast via satellite was later granted on 23 August.

== Logo ==
Controversy regarding the logo of the station arose in October 2024, fueled by anti-Armenian sentiment in Azerbaijan, when reports claim that the lowercase ‘n’ as showcased in the logo looked similar to the Armenian letter Ra, and that it meant “We will return”. The station's authorities later refuted these claims by stating that the new logo was developed based on the capabilities of the station itself, while also calling it "absurd and prejudiced" to compare the letter ‘n’ to a letter of another alphabet.
