= Zivlan =

- Location within Azerbaijan
- Coordinates: 40°22′49″N 46°07′35″E
- Country: Azerbaijan
- Rayon: Dashkasan
- Municipality: Çanaqçı
- Time zone: UTC+4 (AZT)
  - Summer (DST): UTC+5 (AZT)

Zivlan (also, Zivlən, Ziblan, and Zivlyan) is a village in the Dashkasan Rayon of Azerbaijan. The village forms part of the municipality of Çanaqçı.
