= Medeniyyet TV =

Azerbaijani government-owned TV channel

Mədəniyyət TV
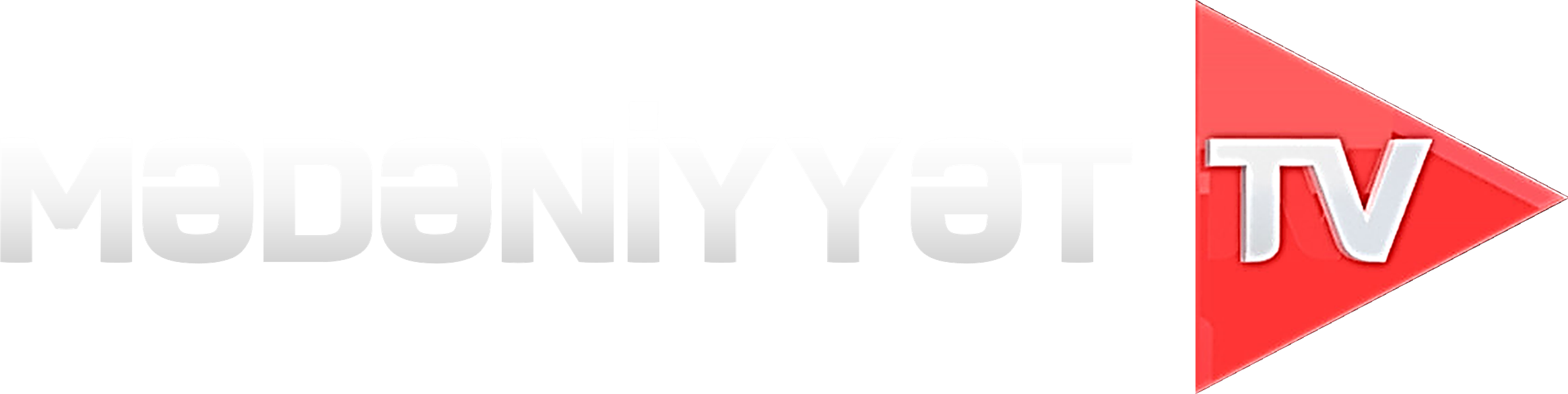
- Country: Azerbaijan
- Headquarters: Baku, Azerbaijan

Programming
- Language: Azerbaijani

Ownership
- Owner: Azerbaijan Television and Radio Broadcasting Closed Joint-stock Company (Government of Azerbaijan)
- Key people: Ulviyye Konul

History
- Launched: 2011

Links
- Website: medeniyyettv.az

Medeniyyet TV (Azerbaijani: Mədəniyyət TV, lit. 'Culture TV') is an Azerbaijani government-owned TV channel showcasing culture and art in Azerbaijan.

The channel began broadcasting on February 14, 2011. On 1 September 2014, the channel adopted the 16:9 broadcast format, and on 14 February 2018, it began operating around the clock. On 31 May 2021, Medeniyyet TV transitioned to HD broadcasting.

== Broadcast area ==
As of March 2014, 99.96% of the population of Azerbaijan can receive Medeniyyet TV via terrestrial, cable, or satellite broadcasting, giving it the largest coverage area of any Azerbaijani television channel.
