= Ağdaban =

- Location within Azerbaijan Location within East Zangezur Economic Region
- Coordinates: 40°11′35″N 46°21′11″E
- Country: Azerbaijan
- District: Kalbajar
- Elevation: 1,624 m (5,328 ft)

Population
  - Total: 460
- Time zone: UTC+4 (AZT)

Ağdaban (Aghdaban) is a village in the Kalbajar District of Azerbaijan. Ağdaban was one of two villages of Kalbajar forming an enclave inside of the Mardakert District of the former Nagorno-Karabakh Autonomous Oblast of the Azerbaijan SSR.

== Aghdaban attack ==
On March 26, 1993, Armenian forces attacked Aghdaban
