= Susuzluq =

Village in Kalbajar, Azerbaijan

- Location within Azerbaijan Location within East Zangezur Economic Region
- Coordinates: 40°14′45″N 46°10′14″E
- Country: Azerbaijan
- Rayon: Kalbajar
- Elevation: 1,731 m (5,679 ft)
- Time zone: UTC+4 (AZT)
  - Summer (DST): UTC+5 (AZT)

Susuzluq (Susuzlug) is a village in the Kalbajar District of Azerbaijan.

== See also ==
- Susuzluq explosion
