= Şürük =

Shuruk Village
- Municipality
- Location within Azerbaijan
- Coordinates: 38°41′33″N 48°48′36″E
- Country: Azerbaijan
- Rayon: Lankaran

Population
  - Total: 1,302
- Time zone: UTC+4 (AZT)
  - Summer (DST): UTC+5 (AZT)

Şürük is a village and municipality in the Lankaran Rayon of Azerbaijan. It has a population of 1,302. Shuruk village is one of the central villages of Lankaran district.

== Participants of the World War II from Shuruk village. ==
Kurbanov (Gurbanov) Alekber Habib

Kurbanov (Gurbanov) Safar Sayfulla

Rzayev Rza Fata

Movsumov Gulagha Ali

Mamedov Ali Bala

Vahabov Calal Miragha

Nasirov Mutallim Kudrat

Abbasov Merzammad Rza

Hasanov Heydar Izzat

== Notable natives ==
- Soltanagha Bayramov — National Hero of Azerbaijan.
