= Bağırlı, Kalbajar =

Bağırlı
- Location within Azerbaijan Location within East Zangezur Economic Region
- Coordinates: 40°12′23″N 46°17′06″E
- Country: Azerbaijan
- District: Kalbajar
- Time zone: UTC+4 (AZT)
  - Summer (DST): UTC+5 (AZT)

Bağırlı (Baghirli) is a village in the Kalbajar District of Azerbaijan.
