= İstisu =

İstisu may refer to:

- İstisu, Ismailli, Azerbaijan
- İstisu, Kalbajar, Azerbaijan
- İstisu, Lankaran, Azerbaijan
