= Çayqovuşan =

Çayqovuşan or Chayqovushan or Chaykavushan may refer to:

- Çayqovuşan, Ismailli, a village in the Ismailli District of Azerbaijan
- Çayqovuşan, Kalbajar, a village in the Kalbajar District of Azerbaijan
