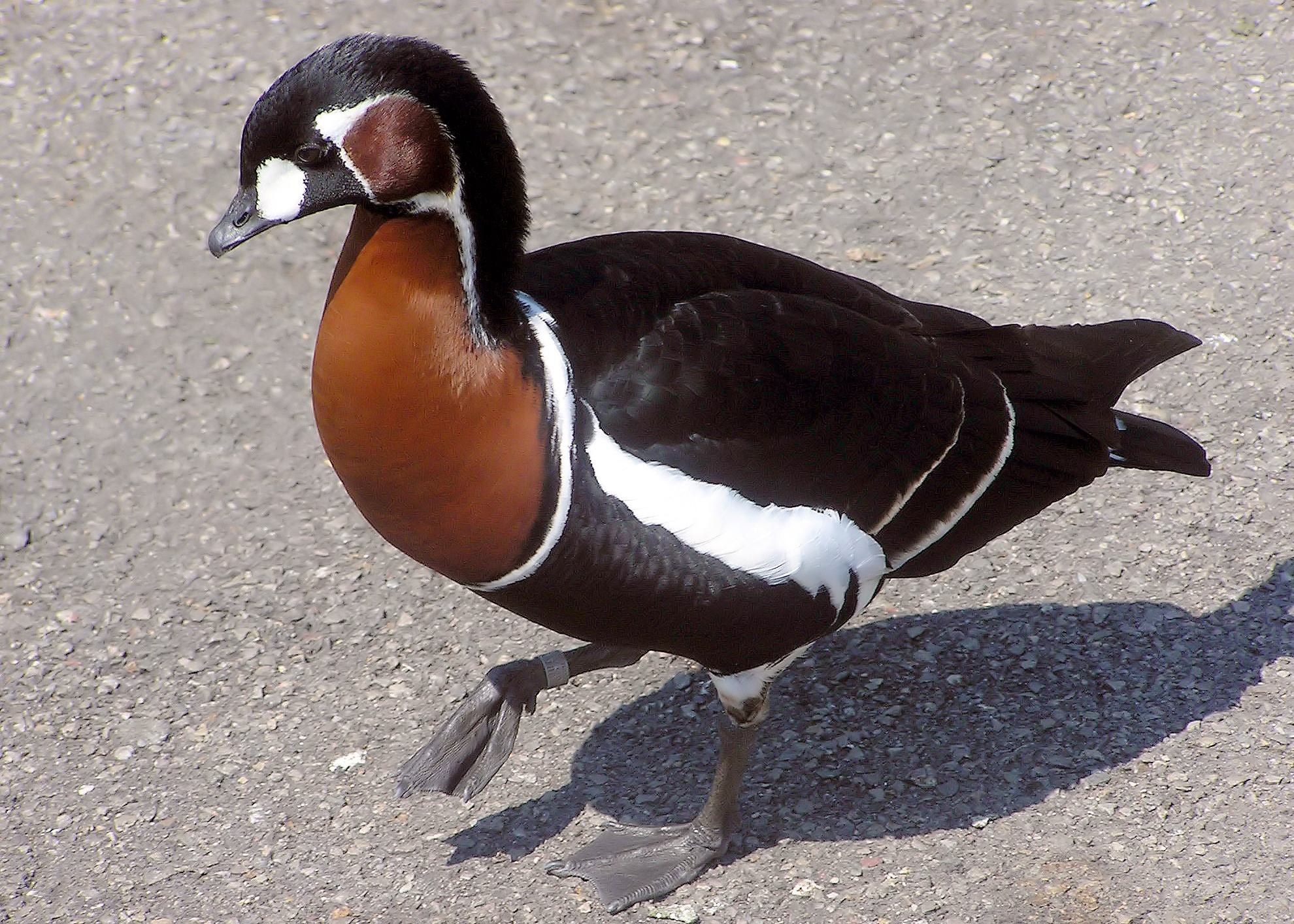
- Red-breasted goose at the Wildfowl & Wetlands Trust

Conservation status
- Vulnerable (IUCN 3.1)
- CITES Appendix II

Scientific classification
- Kingdom: Animalia
- Phylum: Chordata
- Class: Aves
- Order: Anseriformes
- Family: Anatidae
- Genus: Branta
- Species: B. ruficollis

Binomial name
- Branta ruficollis (Pallas, 1769)
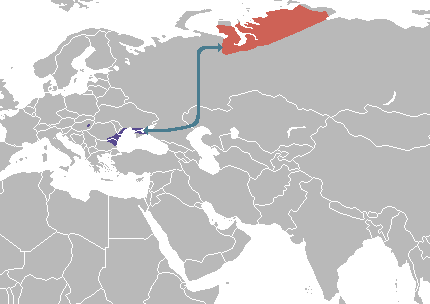

Synonyms
- Rufibrenta ruficollis

Audio
- Red-breasted Goose call (Branta ruficollis) in flight in Geneva, Switzerland

= Red-breasted goose =

Species of waterfowl

The red-breasted goose (Branta ruficollis) is a brightly marked species of goose in the genus Branta from Eurasia. It is currently classified as vulnerable by the IUCN.

== Taxonomy and etymology ==
The red-breasted goose is sometimes placed in its own genus Rufibrenta but appears close enough to the brant goose (Branta bernicla) to make this unnecessary, despite its distinct appearance. Today all major authorities include the red-breasted goose in Branta. Genetic studies indicate that the red-breasted goose may be one the few known examples of hybrid speciation in birds, being the result of ancient interbreeding between the ancestral brant goose and white-cheeked goose (the latter being the ancestral species that later split into all today's Branta species, except the brant and red-breasted geese). This interbreeding appears to have happened at least 3.5 million years ago, with the lineage of the red-breasted goose following its own evolutionary path since then.

Branta is a Latinised form of Old Norse Brandgás, "burnt (black) goose and ruficollis is from the Latin rufus "red" and collis "necked".

== Description ==
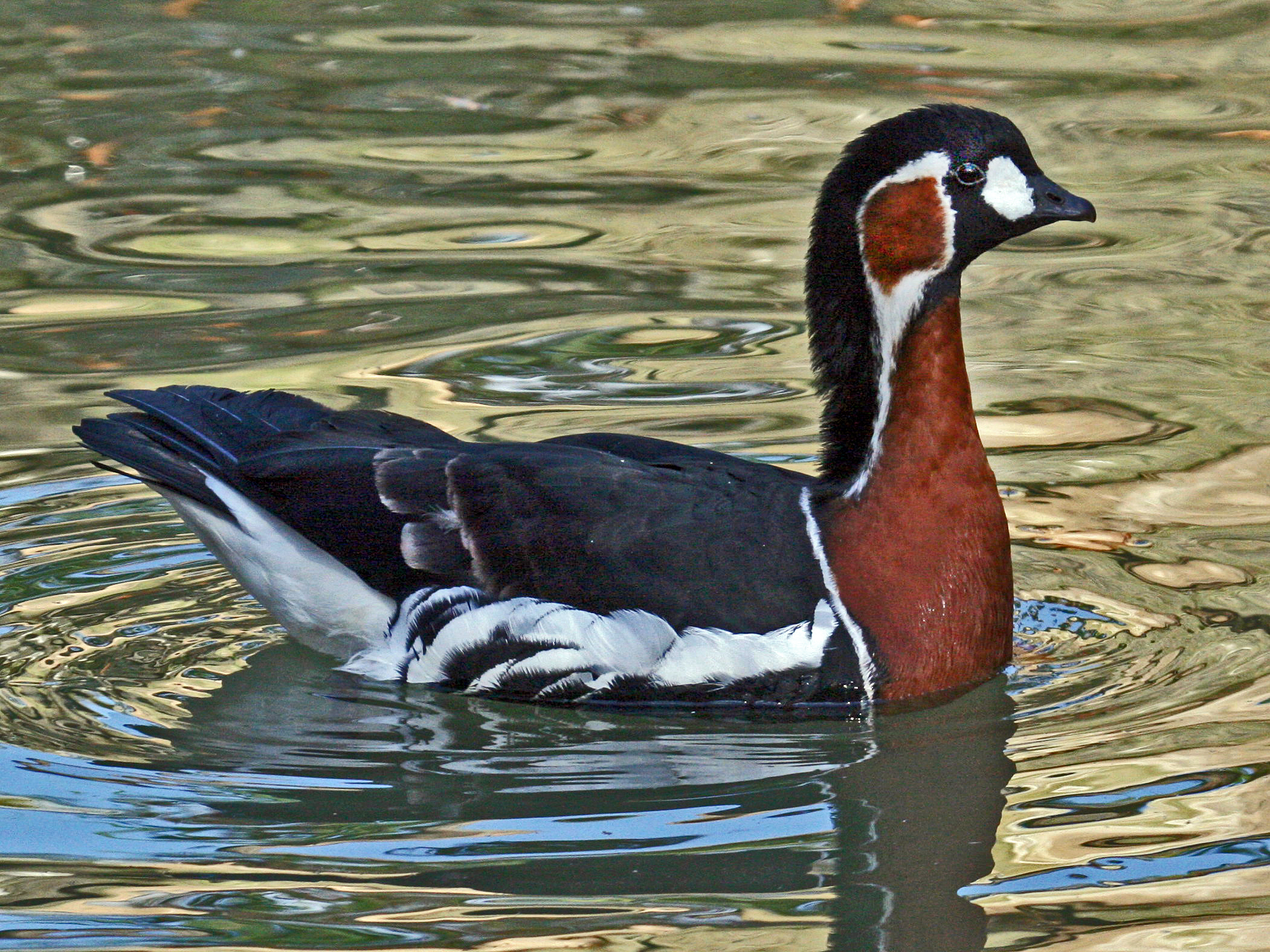
Red-breasted goose swimming

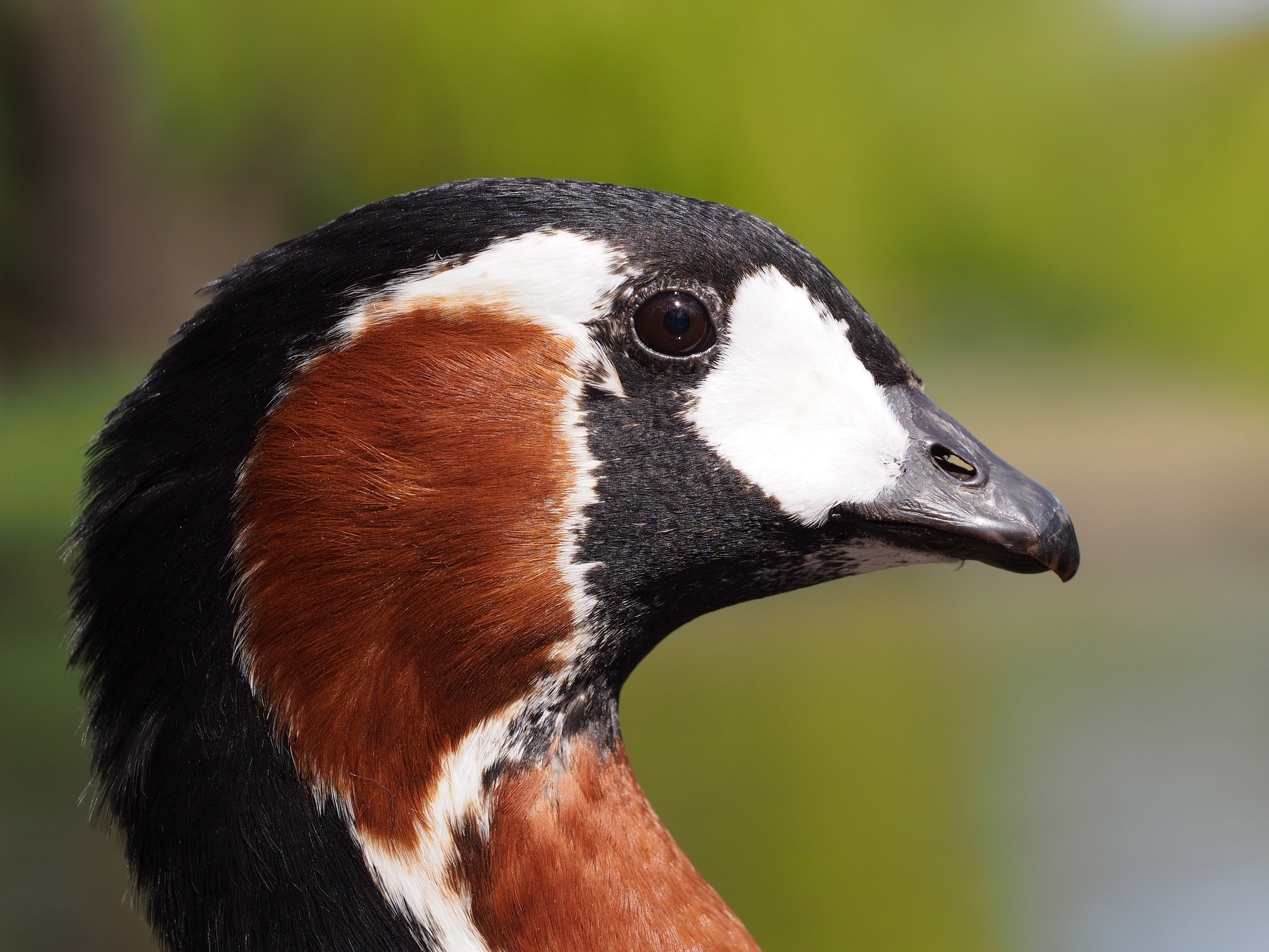
head

All the species of the genus Branta are distinguished by their dark sooty colour, relieved by white, and as a distinction from the grey geese of the genus Anser. This bird measures 53–56 cm (21–22 in) in length, 1.16–1.35 m (3.8–4.4 ft) in wingspan. It is sexually dimorphic, with males being slightly heavier than females, weighing 1.2–1.62 kg (2.6–3.6 lb) and 1.05–1.13 kg (2.3–2.5 lb), respectively. This brightly marked species is unmistakable, but can be surprisingly difficult to find amongst brant geese. At long distances, the red of the breast tends to look dark.

== Distribution ==
The red-breasted goose breeds in Arctic Siberia, mainly on the Taymyr Peninsula, with smaller populations in the Gyda and Yamal peninsulas. Most winter along the northwestern shores of the Black Sea in Bulgaria, Romania and Ukraine (occasionally moving further southwest to Greece), but some winter in Azerbaijan. It is a rare vagrant to Ireland and other western European areas, where it is sometimes found with flocks of Brent or barnacle geese. However, since it is common in captive wildfowl collections, escapees outside its usual range are fairly frequent.

A large part of the population traditionally wintered in Kirov Bay in the Caspian Sea, but in the 1960s the area became unsuitable for the geese due to the agricultural change. Vineyards and cotton replaced the cereal crops used by the wintering geese. However, catastrophic population decline was avoided because they were able to alter their migration strategy and now winter in suitable habitats in Bulgaria and the Dobrogea region of Eastern Romania.

Late Pleistocene remains of the species have been found in Bulgaria, and it is featured on ancient Egyptian paintings, including the famous Meidum Geese.

== Behaviour ==
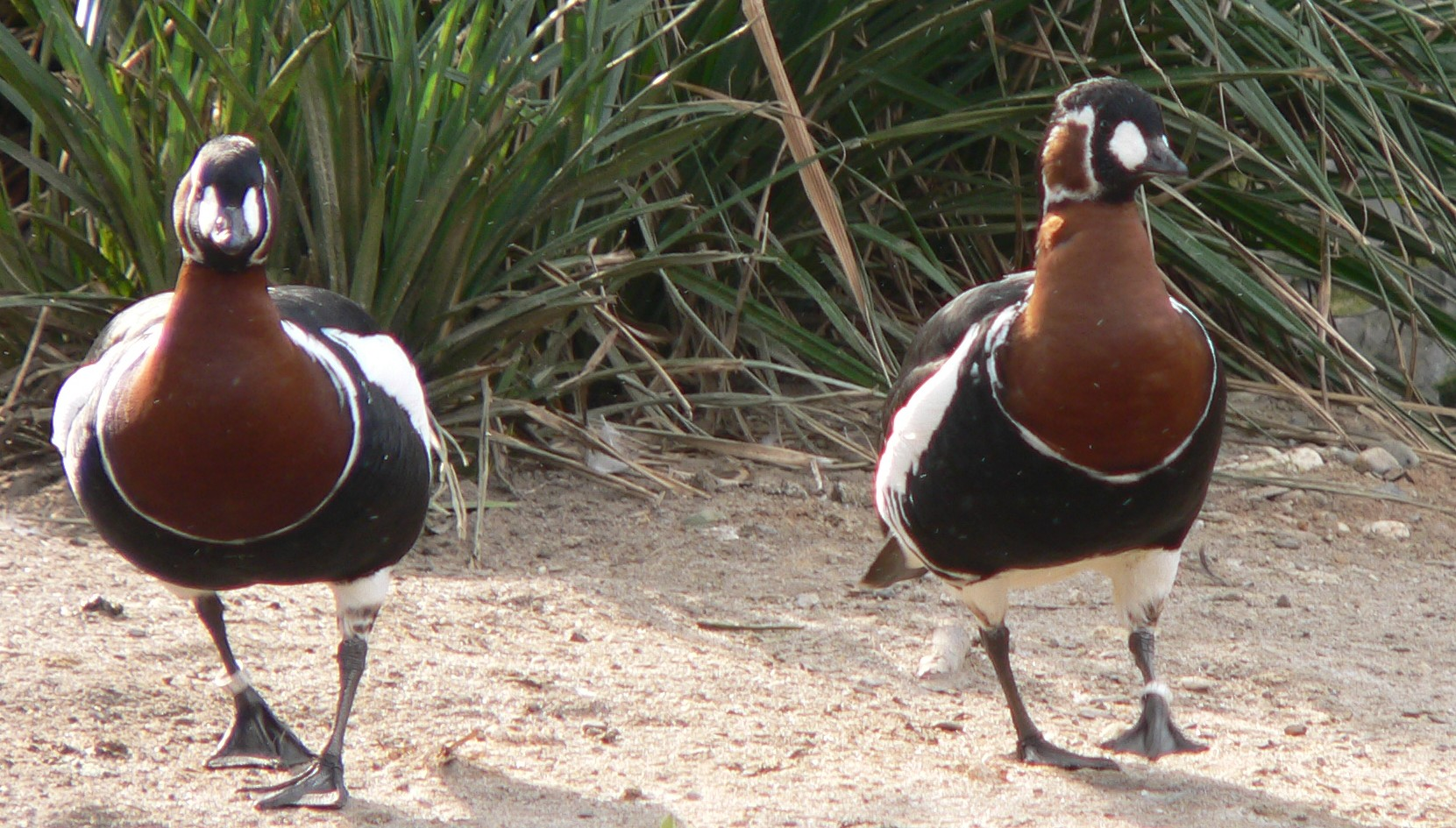
Front view

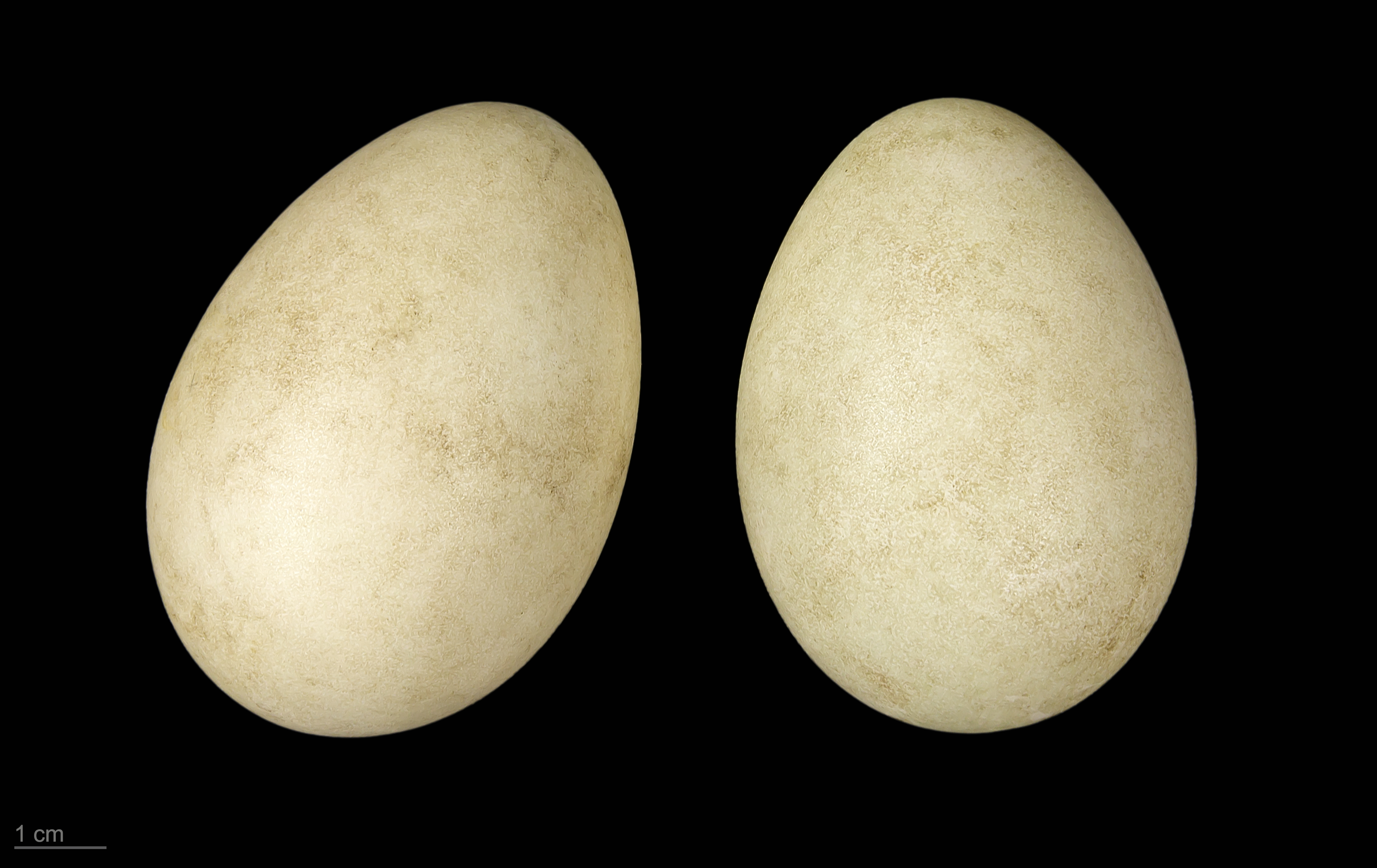
Eggs of red-breasted goose

Calls of red-breasted goose are include honking and hissing in aggression.

The red-breasted goose often nests close to nests of birds of prey, such as snowy owls, peregrine falcons and rough-legged buzzards, which helps to protect this small goose from mammalian predators such as the Arctic fox. The closer the goose's nest to the eyrie (bird of prey nest), the safer it is from predation. Based on the size and how timid the geese are, they rely on the bird of prey for defense. It is extremely unusual for the bird of prey to attack, but is still possible. Additionally, the larger the colony the safer it is. This in turn positively influences the survival and reproductive success of the red-breasted goose. Aside from nesting close to birds of prey, red-breasted geese nest on islands on rivers which also protects them from land-based predators. However, there is evidence that the red-breasted goose will prefer to nest near birds of prey over the choice of a river island. In contrast to the birds of prey that offer the red-breasted goose protection from predators, which choose to place their nests in the open cliff side, this goose will create a cryptic nest hidden much better than the birds of prey nests. A typical red-breasted goose colony is around 4 pairs depending on nest location, food abundance, and bird of prey density. While incubating, the red-breasted goose stays within a 1.5 km (0.9 mi) range of its nest. Eggs of this species measure 6.3–7.4 cm (2.5–2.9 in) in length and 4.2–4.7 cm (1.7–1.9 in) in width, weighing 69–81 g (2.4–2.9 oz). Incubation takes 23–25 days and is done by the female. Male red-breasted goose tend to guard the nest of their young from a distance while the females generally hide on the nest. The main predator for red-breasted geese eggs and goslings is the Taimyr Gull which have access to nests located on river islands.

While wintering, the red-breasted goose feeds on grasses, leaves and seeds. Since owl and buzzard populations fluctuate every few years, depending on lemming abundance, the only consistent protection from predators are river islands and the peregrine falcon.

Flag of Taymyrsky Dolgano-Nenetsky District, featuring a Red breasted goose in flight in the center.

== Conservation ==
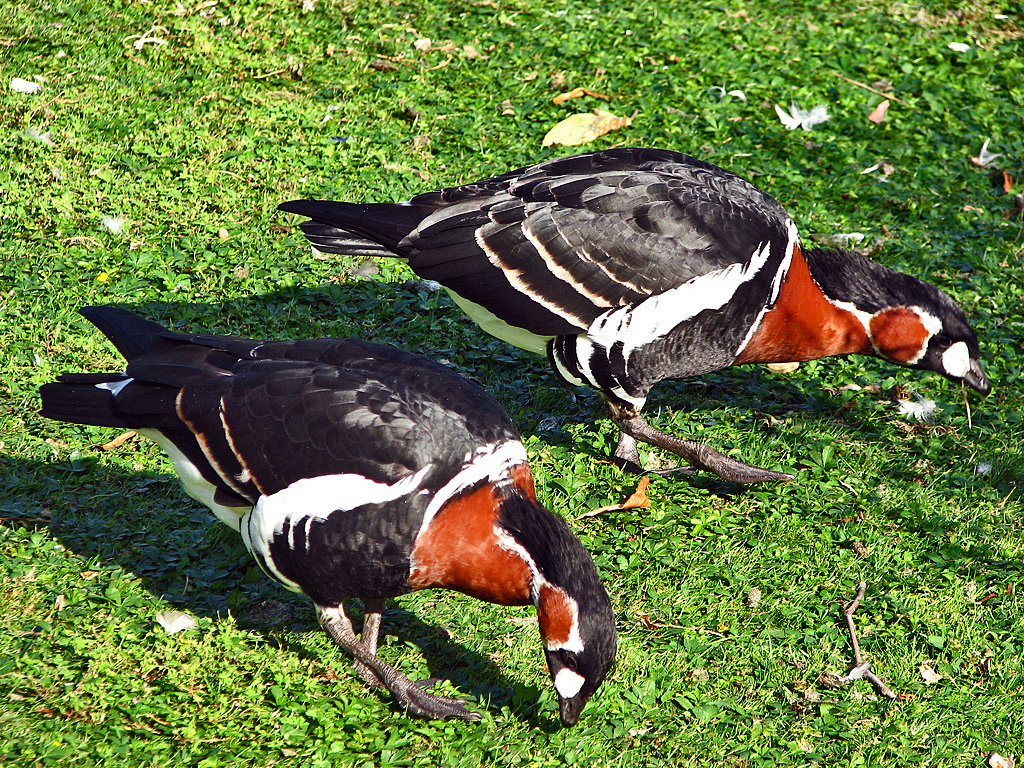
feeding on grass

In autumn of 1997 the population was estimated to be around 88,000 individuals. In the winter these numbers can shrink to around 70,000. The red-breasted goose is one of the species to which the Agreement on the Conservation of African-Eurasian Migratory Waterbirds (AEWA) applies. The red-breasted goose is legally protected in many states, however hunting is still continued. The AEWA is monitoring the species and providing up to date information on the status of the species, its habitat, migrations, ecology, and conservation needs. It was considered a Vulnerable species by the IUCN. Over 80% of the population roost during the winter at just five sites, with nearby feeding areas threatened by changes in land use. In addition, there has been a strong decline in numbers in the last decades. However, it is possible that this decline may have been exaggerated, as it is possible that some birds may winter at unknown sites. The species' winter distribution has already changed significantly since the 1960s when much of the population occurred along the western coast of the Caspian Sea, in Iran, and in Iraq. Some birds may now be wintering farther west as indicated by recorded counts of 2,000 birds in Hungary as of the winter of 2014, whereas counts previously only accounted for a few hundred. As it is not clear to what extent the known population fluctuates in this species—as in other Arctic geese—and given the worsening outlook for the species as a whole, the red-breasted goose was uplisted from Vulnerable to Endangered status in the 2007 IUCN Red List. In 2015 it was relisted as Vulnerable. There have been attempts to conserve the species, such as in 2005–2008, a Life-funded project in Romania was implemented so that the habitat quality of an important salt water lake used by the species was increased. The Life Programme and AEWA hosted a workshop in February 2009 for the species that aimed to draft a new International Species Action Plan and report the results of the Life project.
