= List of victims of the Black January tragedy =

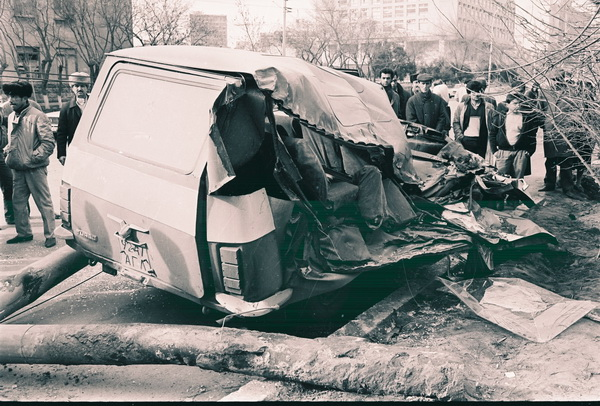
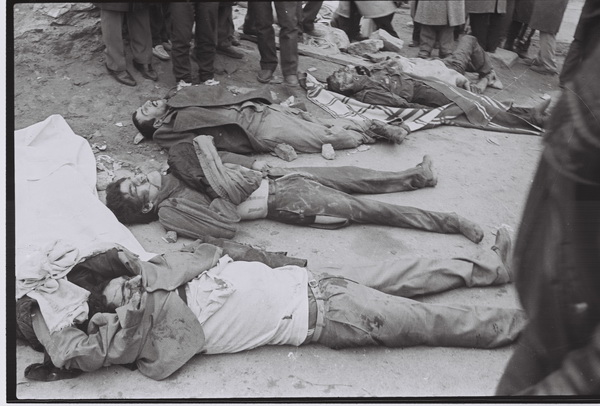
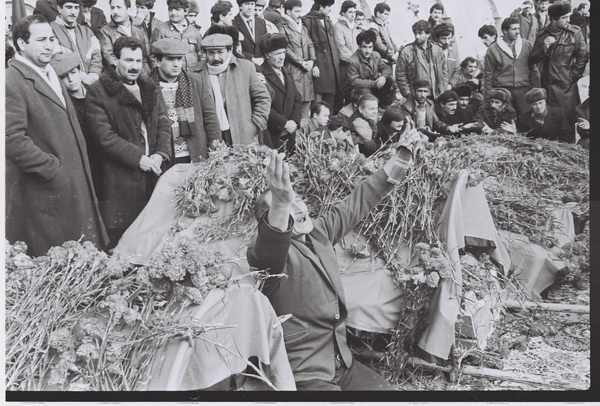
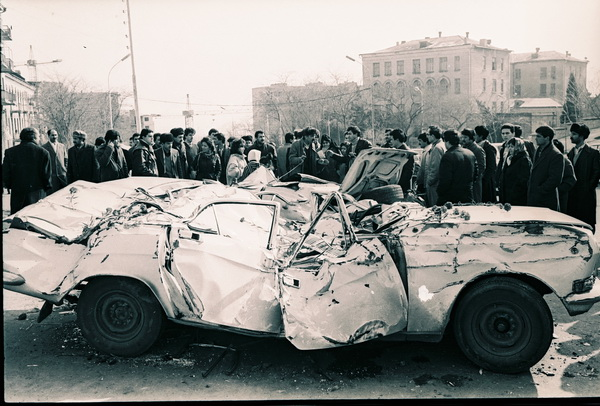
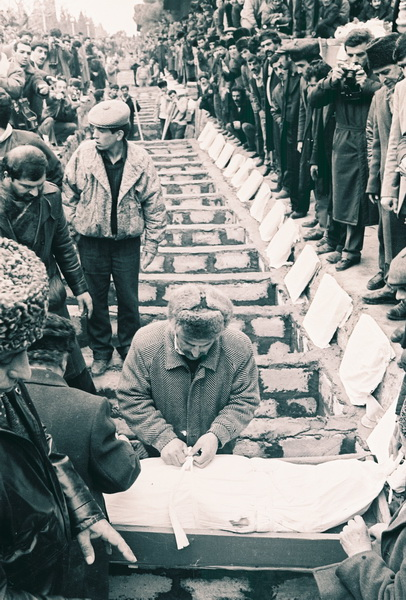
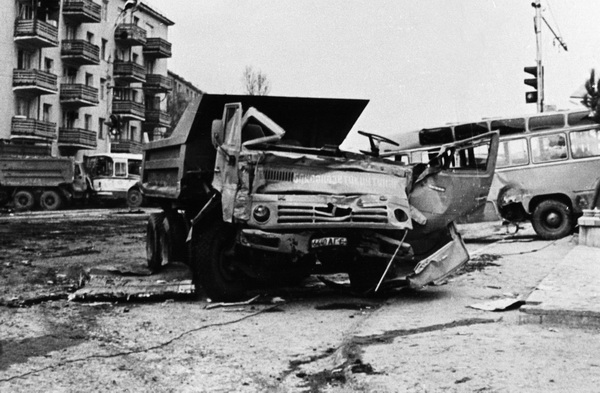
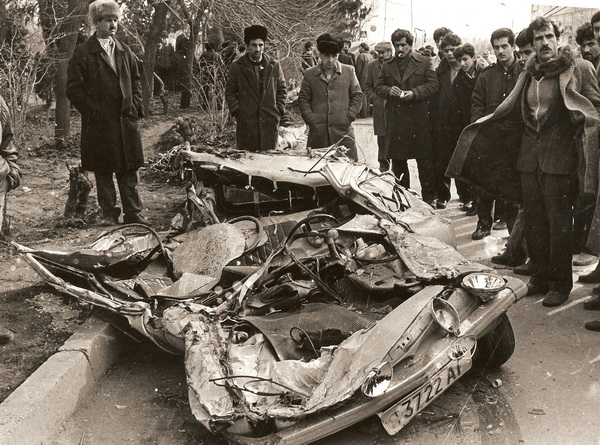
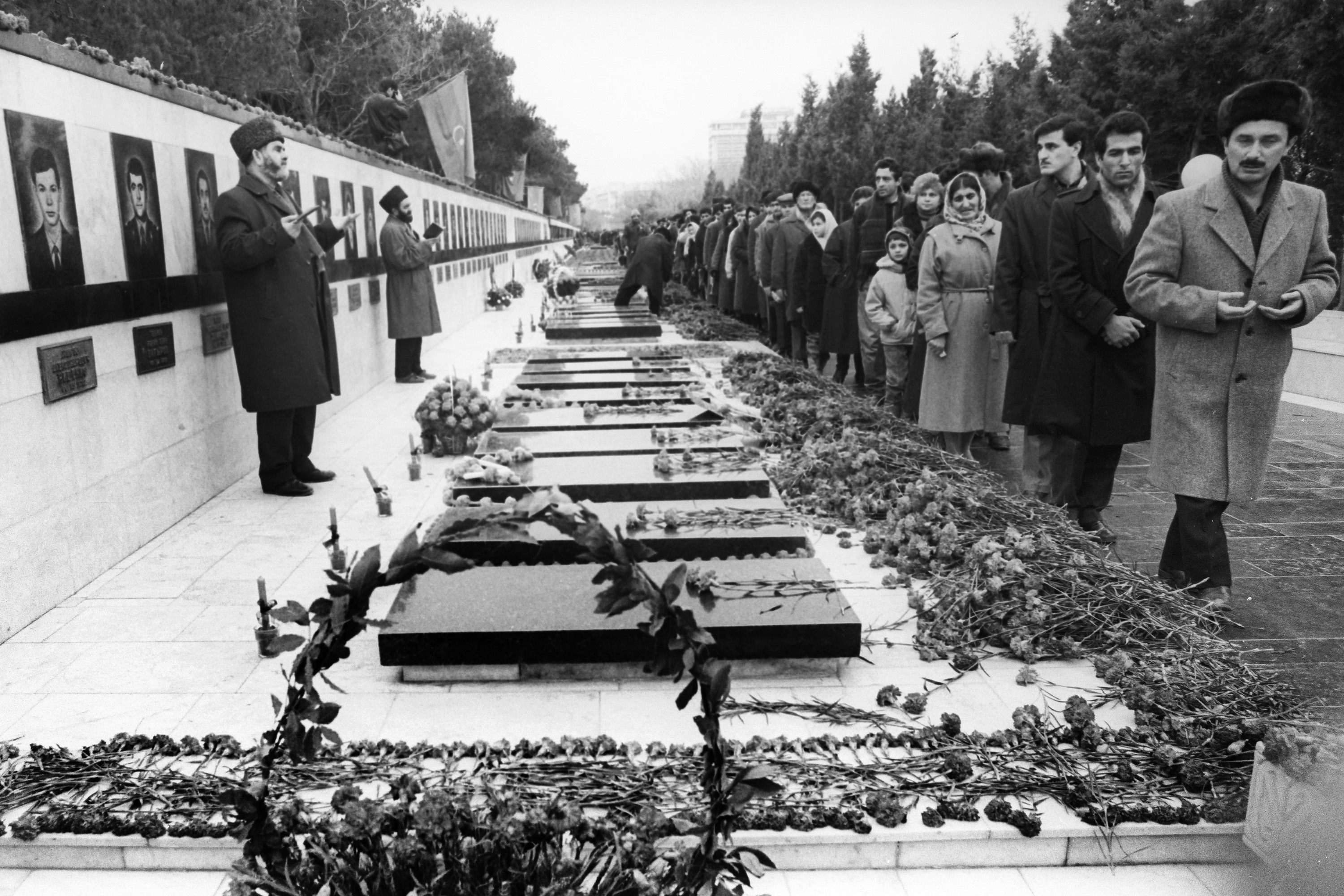
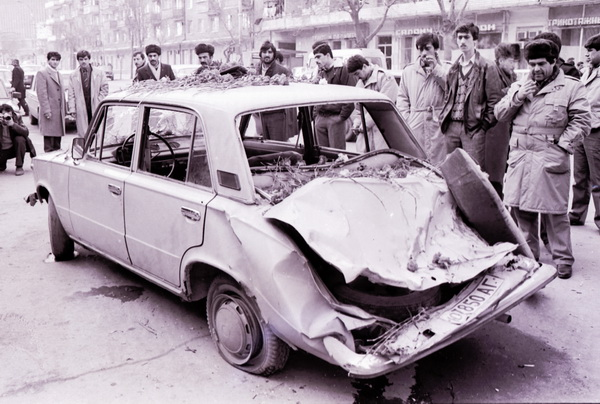
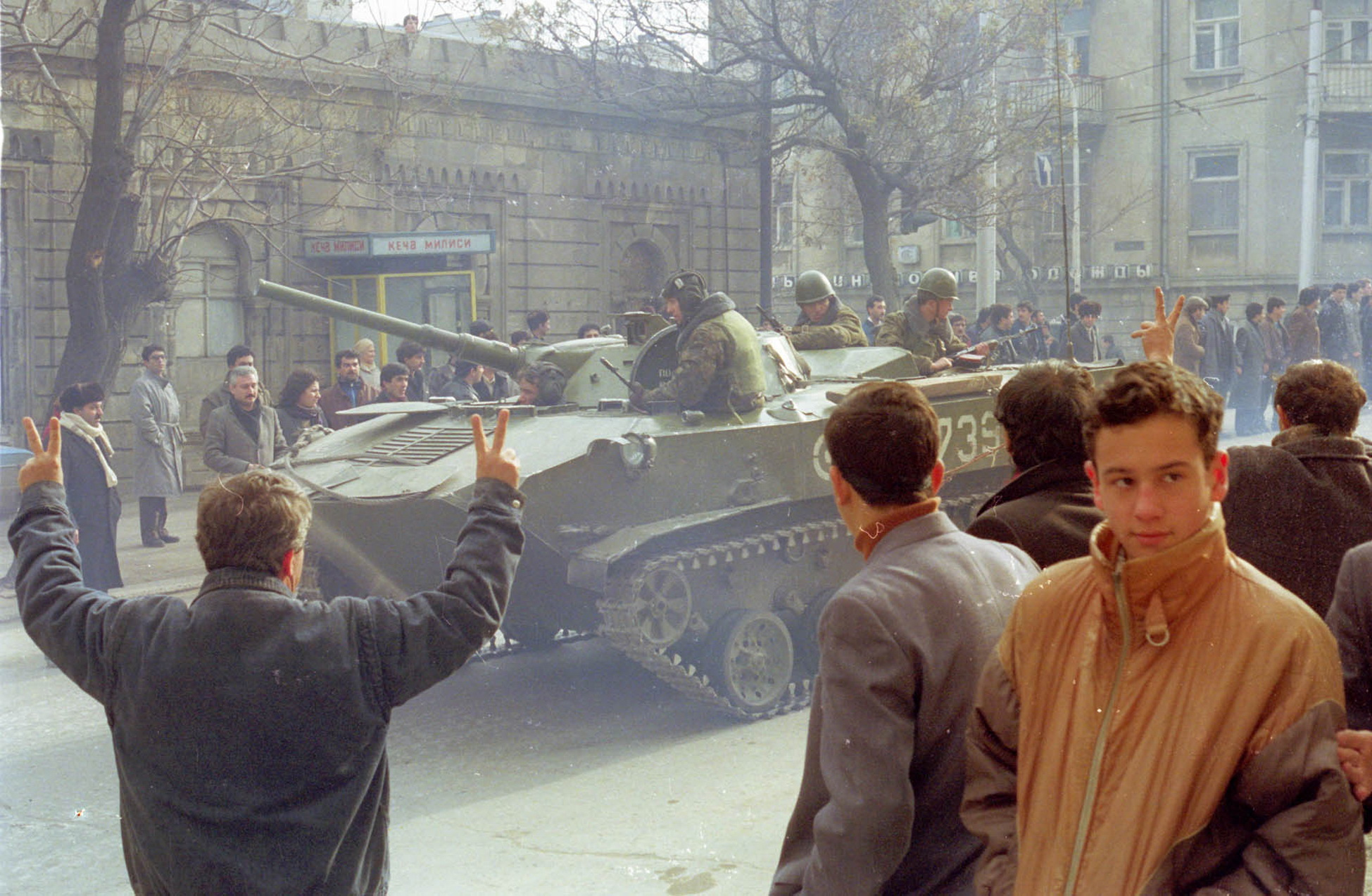
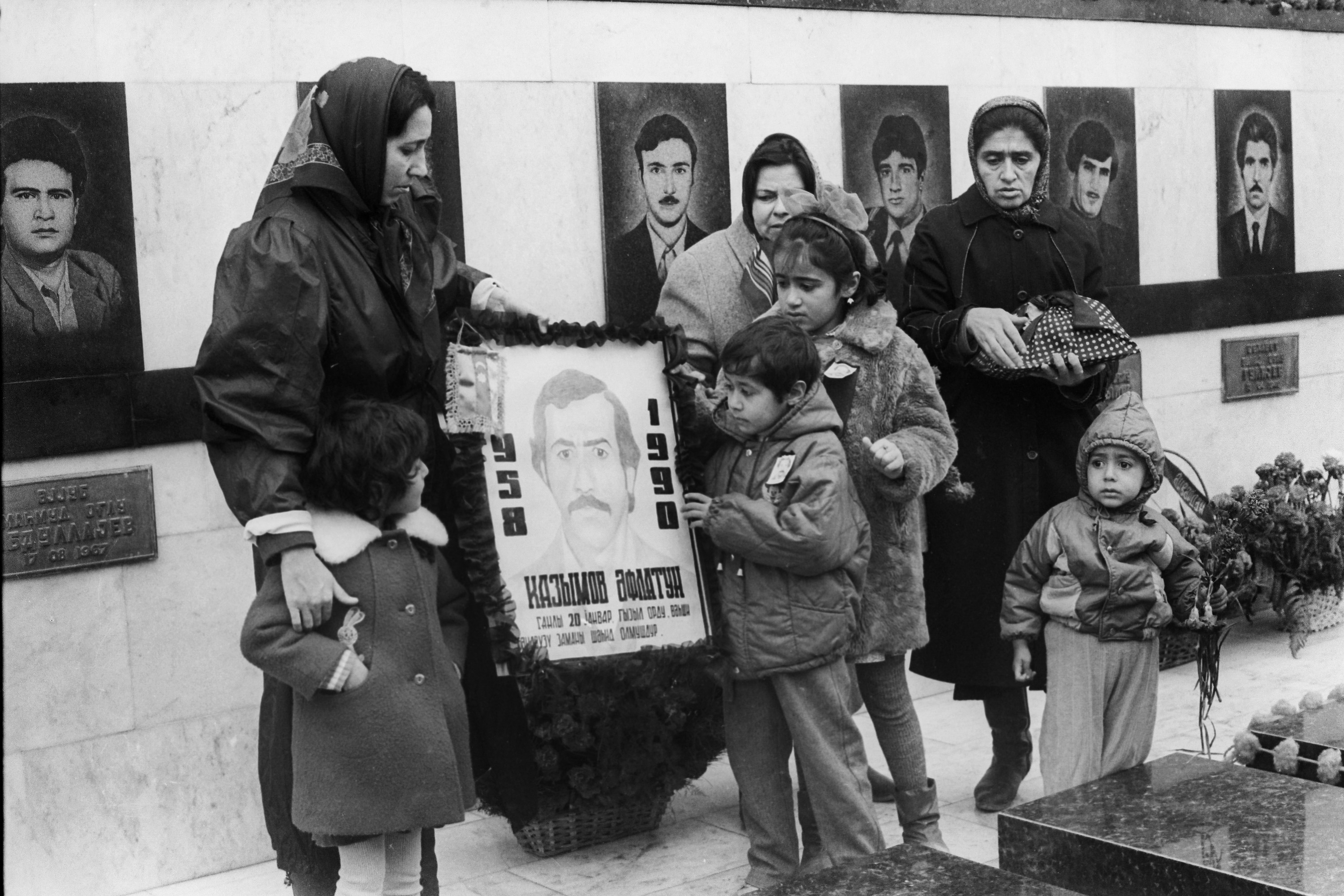

Black January, also known as the January Massacre, was a violent crackdown on the civilian population of Baku on 19–20 January 1990, as part of a state of emergency during the dissolution of the Soviet Union. General Secretary of the Soviet Communist Party Mikhail Gorbachev and Defence Minister Dmitry Yazov asserted that military law was necessary to thwart efforts by the Azerbaijani independence movement to overthrow the Soviet Azerbaijani government. According to official estimates of Azerbaijan 147 civilians were killed, 800 people were injured and five people went missing. In a resolution of 22 January 1990, the Supreme Soviet of Azerbaijan SSR declared that the decree of the Presidium of the Supreme Soviet of the USSR of 19 January, used to impose emergency rule in Baku and military deployment, constituted an act of aggression.

This list contains 138 people who became victims of the Bloody January attack, most of whom died on 20 January 1990 during the operation of the Soviet troops in the capital of the Azerbaijan SSR. Most of them were buried in the Alley of Martyrs. Several people are considered missing, killed or buried elsewhere.

№	Martyr's Name	Date of birth	Nationality	Occupation	Circumstances of death	Death date
1	Allahverdiyev Ilham Ajdar	1962	Azerbaijani	Shipyard worker	Gunned down.	January 20, 1990
2	Allahverdiyev Nariman Amir	1939	Azerbaijani	Janitor	Died as a result of mental shock	January 20, 1990
3	Allahverdiyeva Fariza Choban	1970	Azerbaijani	Student	Committed suicide after death of her husband.	January 20, 1990
4	Abbasova Farida Nariman qizi	1952	Azerbaijani		Shot to death on the balcony of her house.	January 20, 1990
5	Abbasov Zohrab Heydarali oglu	1970	Azerbaijani		Beaten on the square of the 11th Red Army.	January 20, 1990
6	Abbasov Sabir Rzagulu oglu	1968	Azerbaijani	Worker at the Bina airport	Shot, died in hospital.	January 20, 1990
7	Abdullaev Tariel Oruj oglu	1949	Azerbaijani	Worker	Died on the square of the 11th Red Army. The car that was taking him to the hospital came under fire and overturned.	January 27, 1990
8	Abdullaev Zahid Abdulla oglu	1959	Azerbaijani	Worker	Shot in head while firing at a bus.	January 20, 1990
9	Abdullaev Tariel Hajibala oglu	1965	Azerbaijani	Worker, member of the Popular Front	Arrested in Lankaran. On the way to Baku, he was strangled by the military in a helicopter.	January 26, 1990
10	Abdullaev Eyyub Mahmud oglu	1967	Azerbaijani	Worker	Killed in the Nakhichevan hotel.	January 20, 1990
11	Abilhasanov Ilgar Yusif oglu	1967	Azerbaijani	Police Sergeant	Was stopped on the street for documents control. He was shot, while reaching for documents.	January 20, 1990
12	Abulfatov Mirjamal Mirsaleh oglu	1958	Azerbaijani		Went out on the noise of shooting, helped the wounded, and was wounded himself. Died on the way to hospital.	January 20, 1990
13	Aghaverdiyev Aslan Alikram oglu	1952	Azerbaijani	Seller	Died from multiple wounds in the abdominal cavity.	January 21, 1990
14	Aghahuseynov Aghahasan Yary oglu	1957	Azerbaijani	Electrician	Was shot while trying to help the wounded.	January 20, 1990
15	Aghahuseynov Nureddin Aslan oglu	1951	Azerbaijani	Cook	Shot in his own car on his way home.	January 20, 1990
16	Azizov Habil Komunar oglu	1968	Azerbaijani	Student of the Azerbaijan Economic Institute	Having heard the shooting, he and his friends went to the Salyan barracks. Was found in the morning in the morgue of the Semashko hospital.	January 20, 1990
17	Alaskarov Zaur Rasim oglu	1969	Azerbaijani		Shot in the back on the 11th Red Army Square.	January 20, 1990
18	Alakbarov Azer Nasib oglu	1967	Azerbaijani	Student of the Directing Department of the Azerbaijan State University of Arts.		January 20, 1990
19	Aliyev Aruz Ahmadali oglu	1969	Azerbaijani		Killed during shelling by military patrols while driving along the Moskovsky Prospekt.	January 20, 1990
20	Aliyev Bayram Madat oglu	1950	Azerbaijani	Foreman	Died due to gunshot wounds, blunt weapon injuries, fractures and injuries of the internal organs and ribs.	January 20, 1990
21	Aliyev Zabulla Kheyrulla oglu	1946	Azerbaijani	Driver	Shot in head on the 11th Red Army square.	January 20, 1990
22	Aliyev Zahid Bayram oglu	1963	Azerbaijani		Killed as a result receiving three bullet wounds.	January 20, 1990
23	Aliyev Rustam Shahvalad oglu	1965	Azerbaijani	Bus driver	After blocking the machine-gun bursts with the bus, he opened the doors for the wounded. One of the bullets seriously injured Rustam. Despite that, at a high speed he managed to bring the bus to the hospital, where he died.	January 20, 1990
24	Aliyev Namik Kamal oglu	1965	Azerbaijani	Cook		January 20, 1990
25	Aliyev Khalgan Yusif oglu	1969	Azerbaijani	Carpenter	Shot in front of the factory where he worked.	January 20, 1990
26	Aliyev Chingiz Mirzahuseyn oglu	1963	Azerbaijani		Died due to his received wounds in 1994.	1994
27	Alizadeh Faig Abdulhuseyn oglu	1953	Azerbaijani	Worker	Shot at the Ganjlik metro station. Died in hospital.	January 20, 1990
28	Alimov Ramis Kharisovich	1958	Tatar	Locksmith	Went out onto the balcony and, having heard shooting in the street and calls for help, went down to help, and was killed.	January 20, 1990
29	Allahverdiyev Ruslan Kamal oglu	1957	Azerbaijani		Shot in the back, run over by a tank.	January 20, 1990
30	Almammadov Teymur Yahya oglu	1972	Azerbaijani	Student of the Medical Institute	Wounded in head on the 26 January, died in hospital.	January 31, 1990
31	Asadullaev Asif Kamil oglu	1952	Azerbaijani	Engineer	On the night of January 19–20, on their way back to Sabunchu, they met Soviet soldiers near the village of Ramana. The soldiers opened fire on the car without warning, both in the car were seriously injured, Asif died on the spot.	January 20, 1990
32	Askerov Novruz Faik oglu	1968	Azerbaijani	Worked in a construction cooperative	Hearing that there are dead civilians in the city, he went with a friend to the "Mashadi Azizbayov" metro station, where he was fatally wounded in head.	January 20, 1990
33	Atakishiev Bahruz Tofik oglu	1961	Azerbaijani	Worker	Was wounded at the Ganjlik metro station when he left after hearing the shooting. He was taken to the hospital and operated on, but on January 21 he died of a gunshot wound.	January 21, 1990
34	Aghakishiev Shakir Khandadash oglu	1960	Azerbaijani	Locksmith	On his way home was shot from a passing by tank. He had five bullet wounds in his chest.	January 20, 1990
35	Ahmadov Ilgar Hummet oglu	1965	Azerbaijani	Student of the Azerbaijan Polytechnic Institute	Received an eye wound due to gunshot when, together with his friends, was loading the dead and wounded into cars to send them to hospitals.	January 20, 1990
36	Ashrafov Rahman Ismikhan oglu	1955	Azerbaijani	Ambulance driver	Was injured while transporting the injured to hospital. Died three days later in a neurosurgical hospital.	January 24, 1990
37	Babayev Alovsat Hidayat oglu	1948	Azerbaijani		Missing	January 20, 1990
38	Babayeva Surayya Latif qizi	1913	Azerbaijani		Was killed on 22 January when the building she was located in was fired from the passing tanks and armored vehicles.	January 22, 1990
39	Babayev Rahim Vagif oglu	1970	Azerbaijani	Student of the Azerbaijan Institute of Oil and Chemistry named after A. M. Azizbayov	Left home at midnight after hearing gunfire. Was discovered only on 25 January in the morgue of the Semashko hospital, where, according to the testimony of the doctors, he was taken to from a military hospital.	January 20, 1990
40	Babayev Fuad Yaver oglu	1967	Azerbaijani	A 3rd year student of the Azerbaijan Civil Engineering Institute	Hearing the shooting and going out into the street together with other alarmed people, he went to the 11 Red Army square to help the wounded. He was shot on the way.	January 20, 1990
41	Baghirov Baloghlan Habib oglu	1966	Azerbaijani	Veterinarian	On January 23, at 16:00, near a gas station on Tbilisi Avenue, the military for no reason fired at the car in which Baloglan was. He was wounded in the chest and abdomen. Although he was taken to the hospital, he died on 29 January from gunshot wounds.	January 22, 1990
42	Baghirov Telman Melik oglu	1960	Azerbaijani	Junior police sergeant	Shot by the Soviet soldiers.	January 20, 1990
43	Badalov Rovshan Seyfulla oglu	1965	Azerbaijani		While traveling from Haftoni village to Kirov village, Lankaran region, on a motorcycle, on 26 January, he was shot by the Soviet military and then burned.	January 26, 1990
44	Bayramov Isabala Ali oglu	1967	Azerbaijani	Worker	He was fatally wounded in head in the first minutes of the Soviet troops entry into the 11th Red Army square.	January 20, 1990
45	Bakhshaliyev Elchin Mirza oglu	1965	Azerbaijani	Driver	Shot while helping the wounded.	January 20, 1990
46	Bakhshiyev Salman Babakhan oglu	1949	Azerbaijani	Worked in trade	On 26 January, being in the forest with his brother, he was fired upon from a helicopter. The bullet hit his neck. Died on the spot.	January 26, 1990
47	Bessantina Vera Lvovna	1973	Jewish	11th grade student of secondary school number 258	Mortally wounded in her apartment. The house continued to be fired upon and a fire started in the apartment.	January 20, 1990
48	Bogdanov Valery Zakirovich	1958	Russian	Police lieutenant	The car, in which Valery was on duty, was fired by the military, and Valery died along with the Lieutenant Aghanazar Israfilov.	January 20, 1990
49	Bunyadzade Ulvi Yusif oglu	1969	Azerbaijani	Student of the Azerbaijan Pedagogical Institute of Foreign Languages.	Died on the square of the 11th Red Army.	January 20, 1990
50	Hajiyev Mubariz Mahammad oglu	1952	Azerbaijani		Went out to cries for help. He crawled to the hospital with injuries to his leg, shoulder and lungs. However, he lost a lot of blood and died.	January 20, 1990
51	Gayibov Alasgar Yusif oglu	1966	Azerbaijani	Student of the Azerbaijan Civil Engineering Institute	While helping the wounded, he himself was wounded. Died early in the morning of 21 January.	January 21, 1990
52	Hamzayev Balahuseyn Mirgazab oglu	1929	Azerbaijani	Driver	Shot while returning home. On March 24, he died from gunshot wounds.	March 24, 1990
53	Hamidov Izzet Atakishi oglu	1930	Azerbaijani	Worked at the design institute.	Shot on his way to work. He was taken to the hospital, but died on January 22.	January 22, 1990
54	Ganiev Mirza Rzabala oglu	1958	Azerbaijani	Worker	On the way, their cars were shot at. Although he and the driver were injured, the soldiers dragged them out of the car and beat them. He was taken to the hospital. Died on 19 February due to the wounds received.	February 19, 1990
55	Garayev Ilgar Ali oglu	1959	Azerbaijani	Worker of the Baku Metro	He was shot in the forehead.	January 20, 1990
56	Hasanov Ali Khudaverdi oglu	1957	Azerbaijani	Driver	At night, hearing the shooting, he went out into the yard and did not return. His body was found in the morgue on January 21.	January 20, 1990
57	Hasanov Mehman Ibrahim oglu		Azerbaijani	Worked in the information and computing center	Died on the square of the 11th Red Army.	January 20, 1990
58	Hasanov Muzaffar Gazanfar oglu	1939	Azerbaijani	Driver	He transported the wounded to hospitals, was beaten on the head with a truncheon, resulting in a cerebral hemorrhage.	January 29, 1990
59	Hasanov Sahib Nasib oglu	1959	Azerbaijani	Seller	On the way to work by his car, he was fired upon by soldiers on the Inshaatchilar Avenue. The bullet hit his forehead. After that, the fire was again opened over the car, and its rear part was crushed by a tank. Sahib himself received 8 bullet wounds. He died at the Semashko hospital.	January 20, 1990
60	Gasimov Abbas Shammad oglu	1966	Azerbaijani		Died of wounds received on the square of the 11th Red Army.	January 20, 1990
61	Gasimov Yusif Ibrahim oglu	1948	Azerbaijani	Worker	Shot in his own car.	January 20, 1990
62	Hashimov Israfil Aghababa oglu	1964	Azerbaijani	Seller	His body was found in the Semashko hospital with a bullet wound in the chest. It is assumed that the tragedy took place on the square of the 11th Red Army.	January 20, 1990
63	Geybullaev Elchin Siyaddin oglu	1968	Azerbaijani	Worked in construction management	Shot in the street.	January 20, 1990
64	Gojamanov Aliyusif Bilal oglu	1933	Azerbaijani	Seller	Went out on the noise of shots and was shot.	January 20, 1990
65	Huseynov Alimardan Abil oglu	1962	Azerbaijani	Electrician at Azerelektroterm	Leaving work, he was first wounded in leg, then in chest. Afterwards was beaten with truncheons (there were a lot of bruises on the right side of his body)	January 20, 1990
66	Huseynov Nariman Vali oglu	1975	Azerbaijani	8th grade student	At night, having heard the shooting, he went out into the street. Near the Salyan barracks he was wounded by machine gun bullet. Was taken to Semashko hospital. In the morning, Narimans body was found in the morgue. The death note reads: "Many bullet wounds in the chest."	January 20, 1990
67	Huseynov Rahib Mammad oglu	1939	Azerbaijani	Trade worker	On 12 February, driving the car by the Khazar cinema, was killed when his car was fired upon. He was father of eight children.	January 20, 1990
68	Javanshirov Ilkin Zulgadar oglu	1933	Azerbaijani	Taxi driver	Shot while driving a wounded man to the hospital. There were 18 bullet holes left on the taxi car. Died on 23 January at the Semashko hospital.	January 23, 1990
69	Jafarov Abulfaz Boyukagha oglu	1966	Azerbaijani		He was shot dead on January 25 after being beaten in Neftchala. The soldiers cut off his finger to remove the ring from him. His body was found in one of the central Baku morgues.	January 25, 1990
70	Durdyev Anageldi	1954	Azerbaijani		Declared missing by the Nizami District Court of Baku since 20 January 1990.	January 20, 1990
71	Efimichev Boris Vasilyevich	1945		Worked in the factory for the blind	On 20 January, he returned home wounded, saying that on the Haqverdiyev Street the military had hit him with a bayonet and then fired. At the hospital, it turned out that Boris's internal organs were completely damaged. He died the next day.	January 21, 1990
72	Zulalov Isfandiyar Adil oglu	1963	Azerbaijani	Worked in the geological department	He was killed in the area of the Salyan barracks. His body was disfigured beyond recognition. He could only be recognized by his shoes.	January 20, 1990
73	Ibrahimov Ibrahim Ismail oglu	1928	Azerbaijani	Professor, Doctor of Science	On 24 January, together with the professors Svetlana Mamedova and Ismail Mirsagulov, he was driving to work in Sumgayit by his car which was hit by a military armored personnel carrier. All three scientists were killed.	January 24, 1990
74	Ibrahimov Ilgar Rashid oglu	1976	Azerbaijani	7th grade student	That evening he went with his friends to the 11th Red Army square to help people. In the morning, Ilgar's body was found in the morgue.	January 20, 1990
75	Imanov Elchin Beydulla oglu	1967	Azerbaijani	Student of Azerbaijan Medical University	Mortally wounded in front of the House of Culture of the Sattarkhan plant.	January 20, 1990
76	Isayev Mushvig Aghaali oglu	1968	Azerbaijani	Wrestler, brother of the world freestyle wrestling champion Khazar Isayev	Shot at the Ganjlik metro station	January 20, 1990
77	Isayev Rauf Soltanmejid oglu	1962	Azerbaijani	Locksmith	Killed in front of Salyan barracks when the soldiers opened the fire on unarmed people	January 20, 1990
78	Isayev Fakhraddin Khudu oglu	1963	Azerbaijani		Shot at point-blank range on the 11th Red Army Square, while helping the wounded	January 20, 1990
79	Ismayilov Javad Yunis oglu	1962	Azerbaijani	Worker, a relative of the Azerbaijani poet Mikayil Mushfig (Mikayil Ismayilzade)	Passing through the square of the 11th Red Army, he received a fatal bullet wound	January 20, 1990
80	Ismayilov Mammadali Novruz oglu	1946	Azerbaijani		Killed in a car shelling near the road to Mardakan.	January 20, 1990
81	Ismayilov Rashid Islam oglu	1949	Azerbaijani	Worked on the railroad	During the shelling, he was at home, but went out on the street to the sound of shooting and people shouting. Before leaving, he asked his wife to take care of the children and give her the food stamps.	January 20, 1990
82	Ismayilov Tofig Babakhan oglu	1956	Azerbaijani		Shot while assisting the ambulance workers	January 20, 1990
83	Israfilov Aghanazar Araz oglu	1960	Azerbaijani	Police lieutenant	Killed by shelling of a car on Tbilisi Avenue	January 20, 1990
84	Karimov Alexander Ramazan oglu	1970	Azerbaijani		Shot while helping the wounded. Died 17 days later.	February 6, 1990
85	Karimov Ilgar Isa oglu		Azerbaijani	Worked in a factory	Returning from work, he was shot at the railway hospital in Biləcəri.	January 20, 1990
86	Karimov Oktay Eyvaz oglu	1964	Azerbaijani	Worker in the repair and construction department No.28	Killed at the Ganjlik metro station	January 20, 1990
87	Guliev Sakhavet Balay oglu	1940	Azerbaijani	Worked in trade	Shot in the back as he left the house on the noise of gunfire	January 20, 1990
88	Kazimov Aflatun Gasim oglu	1959	Azerbaijani	Worker	Killed on Moskovsky Prospekt. There were 14 bullet wounds found in the body.	January 20, 1990
89	Mamedova Larisa Farman qizi	1977	Azerbaijani	7th grade student	Died from a gunshot wound to the heart during the shelling of a bus.	January 20, 1990
90	Mamedova Svetlana Hamid qizi	1939	Azerbaijani	Professor, Doctor of Chemistry, author of 110 scientific papers, and more than 40 inventions	On the way to work in Sumgayit on 24 January. Being in a Zhiguli car together with the professors Ismail Mursagulov and Ibrahim Ibrahimov, they stopped at the side of the road after which they were run over by a military armored vehicle.	January 24, 1990
91	Mammadov Vagif Mahammad oglu	1960	Azerbaijani	Worker, an activist of the Popular Front of Azerbaijan in Lankaran	After the events in Baku, he and his comrades hid in the forest, where he was shot by the military.	January 20, 1990
92	Mammadov Vidadi Uzeyir oglu	1944	Azerbaijani	Engineer	He was shot point-blank in the back on the square of the 11th Red Army.	January 20, 1990
93	Mammadov Ibish Behbud oglu	1961	Azerbaijani		Killed at the Salyan barracks.	January 20, 1990
94	Mamedov Kamal Seidgurban oglu	1955	Azerbaijani		Shot by soldiers near the village of Surakhany	January 20, 1990
95	Mamedov Mamed Yarmamed oglu	1959	Azerbaijani	Bus driver	Mamedov's bus came under fire. Mamed himself was hit by 35 automatic bullets.	January 20, 1990
96	Mamedov Mehman Sahibali oglu		Azerbaijani		Killed by bullet wounds.	January 20, 1990
97	Mamedov Rahim Magomed oglu	1969	Azerbaijani		Died on 26 January in the Istisu forest (Lankaran), where he was hiding together with other PFA activists.	January 26, 1990
98	Mammadov Sakhavet Heydar oglu	1958	Azerbaijani	Driver	Killed by shelling a car	January 20, 1990
99	Mammadov Shahin Zahid oglu	1972	Azerbaijani	Studied at the vocational school number 113	On 26 January, together with his friends, he came under fire from the military on the way from the village of Khoftomi to the village of Kirov, the Lenkoran region.	January 26, 1990
100	Mamedov Eldar Zeynal oglu	1966	Azerbaijani	Worker	Shot on the Stroiteley Avenue.	January 20, 1990
101	Markhevka Alexander Vitalievich	1958		Emergency doctor	Killed by shelling an ambulance car on the Turkan highway.	January 20, 1990
102	Meerovich Yan Maksimovich	1955		Businessman-Entrepreneur	Brutally killed on the night of 19–20 January. Went with his friend Mirzoev Elchin to the airport, to drove their neighbour. 22 bullets were found in his body.	January 20, 1990
103	Mirzoev Azad Aligeydar oglu	1961	Azerbaijani		Hearing the shooting, he and his mother went out onto the porch. Several bullets flew into the room through the open doors. Mortally wounded	January 20, 1990
104	Mirzoev Vagif Samed oglu	1959	Azerbaijani	Electrician	On the road Bina-Mardakan, he was first stabbed in the heart with a bayonet, and then a machine gun was fired at him.	January 20, 1990
105	Mirzoev Elchin Huseyngulu oglu	1961	Azerbaijani	Graduate of Azerbaijan Medical University	On the evening of 19 January, the car in which Elchin and two neighbors were on their way to the airport were fired upon by soldiers. Elchin and Yan Meerovich were killed. 19 bullet wounds were found on his body	January 20, 1990
106	Movludov Fuad Farhad oglu	1968	Azerbaijani	Firefighter	On the night of 19–20 January, he was near the Northern State District Power Plant. When the tanks began to approach, he tried to flee, but was stabbed to death with a bayonet. Died in hospital on 25 January	January 20, 1990
107	Muradov Mehman Asad oglu	1961	Azerbaijani	Foreman in the repair and production association "Azelectroterm"	Shot near the gate of the Salyan barracks	January 20, 1990
108	Mursagulov Ismail Hasan oglu	1939	Azerbaijani	Professor, Doctor of Science	On 24 January, on the way to work in Sumgayit. The car of the Professor Ibragim Ibragimov, in which, there were other scientists, was crushed by a military armored vehicle	January 20, 1990
109	Musaev Tofik Ayvaz oglu	1962	Azerbaijani		Declared missing by the Nasimi District Court of Baku city since 19 January 1990	January 20, 1990
110	Mustafayev Mahir Vagif oglu	1968	Azerbaijani	Driver	Shot on his way back to the 11th Red Army square to pick up the wounded and take them to the hospital	January 20, 1990
111	Mukhtarov Rasim Mustafa oglu	1958	Azerbaijani	Locksmith	Shot in head while driving the car on the night of 26 February	January 20, 1990
112	Nasibov Allahyar Iskender oglu	1952	Azerbaijani		He died on the square on 11 January. His body was found in the morgue in the morning.	January 20, 1990
113	Nasibov Yanvar Shirali oglu	1957	Azerbaijani		Killed due to bullet wounds. Details are unknown	January 20, 1990
114	Nikolaenko Alla Alekseevna	1972			Shot to death in her house on the evening of 19 January	January 20, 1990
115	Nishchenko Andrey Alexandrovich	1972		Studied at the railway school	Killed after being hit with a bayonet near the Khazar cinema	January 20, 1990
116	Novruzbeyli Aghabek Oktay oglu	1971	Azerbaijani	Second year student of the Azerbaijan Institute of Oil and Chemistry (now Azerbaijan State Oil Academy)	Committed suicide in protest against the entry of Soviet troops into Baku and the inaction of the local puppet government	January 20, 1990
117	Nuriev Zahir Zabi oglu		Azerbaijani		By the decision of the Nasimi court, Baku was declared missing since 19 January 1990	January 20, 1990
118	Orudzhev Shamsaddin Abilgasan oglu	1950	Azerbaijani	Engineer	Mortally wounded by a stray bullet that smashed the window of his house	January 20, 1990
119	Poladi Saleh Aligulu oglu	1968	Azerbaijani		Killed on the night of 20 January on the square of the 11th Red Army	January 20, 1990
120	Rakhmanov Islam Oktay oglu	1968	Azerbaijani	Worker	Armored vehicles opened the fire on him. Islam received three bullet wounds. He died on 29 January	January 29, 1990
121	Rzayev Azad Allahverdi oglu	1965	Azerbaijani		Kamaz, in which Azad was, came under fire at the 2nd kilometer of the Alaty settlement. Azad was wounded. He died on the way to hospital	January 20, 1990
122	Rustamov Rovshan Mamed oglu	1961	Azerbaijani		On the evening of 19 January, he left the house. Died in the morning due to the received bullet wounds	January 20, 1990
123	Sadigov Yusif Allahverdi oglu	1964	Azerbaijani	Graduate student	Left home after midnight. Only his right hand was found. It was recognized by the shirt tied by the mother's hands. His right hand remained buried in the cemetery	January 20, 1990
124	Salaeva Sevda Mamedagha qizi		Azerbaijani		On 22 December 1990, at 2 am, near the Karl Marx monument, the car Sevda was in came under fire. She died due to the head wounds	January 20, 1990
125	Salakhov Sherafeddin Muzaffar oglu	1963	Azerbaijani	Worked in a publishing house	The bullet pierced the top of the neck and shattered the brain	January 20, 1990
126	Semyonov Alexander Vladimirovich	1947			On the night of 20 January, while in a car on Tbilisi Avenue, he was wounded by a firearm. Died on 25 January	January 20, 1990
127	Safarov Bafadar Aghamirza oglu	1923	Azerbaijani	Retired, veteran of the Great Patriotic War	Shot in his own car	January 20, 1990
128	Tokarev Vladimir Ivanovich	1954	Azerbaijani	Driver working in a taxi fleet	Shot on his way to the airport	January 20, 1990
129	Turabov Tengiz Mamed oglu	1965	Azerbaijani	Student	The bus in which Tengiz was traveling was shot	January 20, 1990
130	Tuktamyshev Fergat Sharifullaevich	1958	Azerbaijani	Locksmith	Came under fire at the Salyan barracks. He was wounded in head. His body was found only on 24 January in the morgue of the Semashko hospital.	January 20, 1990
131	Khammedov Baba Magomed oglu	1939	Azerbaijani	Physics teacher	Shot on his way home	January 20, 1990
132	Khanmamedov Jebrail Huseynkhan oglu		Azerbaijani		Killed on the night of 20 January by bullet wounds	January 20, 1990
133	Kharitonov Vladimir Alexandrovich	1949		Police Major	Shot on the way home in his car at Darnagul Bridge (the second bullet hit the head)	January 20, 1990
134	Sharifov Murvat Rahim oglu	1932	Azerbaijani	Former employee of the Zangezur Copper Molybdenum Combine	Shot in his home yard	January 20, 1990
135	Eminov Vafadar Osman oglu	1966	Azerbaijani		Shot dead on 23 January, when walking down to the Olimp store past the Vodnikov hospital. Died in hospital due to blood loss	January 23, 1990
136	Yusupov Oleg Kerimovich	1944		Firefighter, senior sergeant	Heading to the place of a fire (the building of the Kommunist publishing house was on fire), the fire engine in which Oleg was traveling was shot. He was taken to the hospital. Died 2 hours later	January 20, 1990
137	Yagubov Nusrat Ismail oglu	1958	Azerbaijani	Worked at the Dubendi oil refinery near Mardakan	On the night of 20 January, while driving home from the Gala village, near the military unit, he was fired upon by soldiers. Died on 22 January in Mardakan hospital	January 22, 1990
138	Unknown	The pathological description stated that he was 25–30 years old.	Azerbaijani	Unknown	The bullet went through the forehead	January 20, 1990
139			Azerbaijani			January 20, 1990
140			Azerbaijani			January 20, 1990

== Memory ==
In 2010, a monument was erected in Baku in the memory of the victims of the tragedy. The names of 147 victims are carved on the granite pedestal of the monument in gold letters.

In the building of the Azerbaijani Embassy in Moscow, there is a memorial plate on which the names of the victims of the 20 January tragedy are engraved.

On 16 January 2015, the "Həyatın və ölümün dərsləri" ("Lessons of Life and Death") event dedicated to the 25th anniversary of the 20 January tragedy was held at the Azerbaijan Museum of Independence in Baku. Within the framework of the event, an exhibition was presented, the exposition of which included the personal belongings of the victims of the tragedy donated to the museum in the same year by their relatives. Among the exhibits were the personal belongings of Azer Alekperov, Ulvi Bunyadzade, Ilham Allahverdiyev, Fariza Allahverdiyeva, Alasgar Gaibov, Larisa Mamedova, Andrey Nishchenko, Aghabek Novruzbeyli.

== Literature ==
- Kangarli, Gulu (1992). Qara Yanvar şəhidləri / Victims of the Black January (PDF). Baku: Ganjlik.
