= Black January =

Violent 1990 crackdown in Baku, Azerbaijan SSR

- Part of the dissolution of the Soviet Union
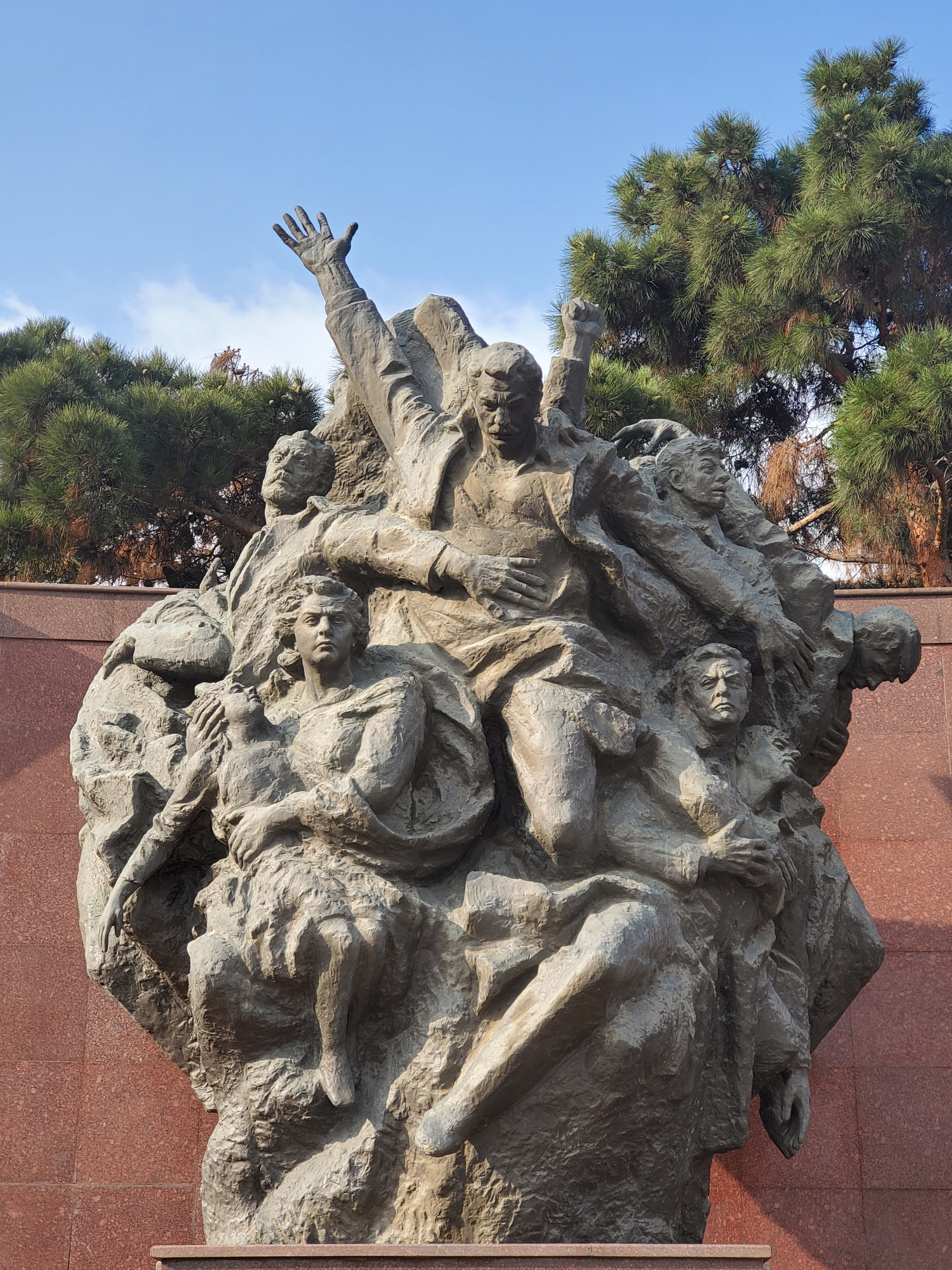
- January 20 monument
- Location: Baku, Azerbaijan SSR, Soviet Union
- Date: 19–20 January 1990
- Deaths: 131–170
- Injuries: 700–800
- Victim: Azerbaijanis
- Perpetrator: Soviet Army

Black January (Azerbaijani: Qara Yanvar), also known as Black Saturday or the January Massacre, was a violent crackdown on anti-Soviet and anti-Armenian sentiments, Azerbaijani nationalism, and irredentism in Baku on 19 and 20 January 1990, as part of a state of emergency during the dissolution of the Soviet Union.

General Secretary of the Soviet Communist Party Mikhail Gorbachev and Defence Minister Dmitry Yazov asserted that military law was necessary to thwart efforts by the Azerbaijani independence movement to overthrow the Soviet Azerbaijani government. According to official estimates of Azerbaijan, 147 civilians were killed, 800 people were injured, and five people went missing.

In a resolution of 22 January 1990, the Supreme Soviet of Azerbaijan SSR declared that the decree of the Presidium of the Supreme Soviet of the USSR of 19 January, used to impose emergency rule in Baku and military deployment, constituted an act of aggression.

== Events ==
In December 1989, Azerbaijanis living in regions bordering Iran ripped down border fences, demanding closer ties with ethnic Azerbaijanis living in Iran. The local authorities in Jalilabad surrendered to rioters, turning over administration to the Popular Front of Azerbaijan. This was followed by a non-violent turnover of the Lankaran administration to the Popular Front two weeks later.

On 9 January 1990, the Supreme Soviet of the Armenian SSR voted to include Nagorno-Karabakh in its budget and allowed its inhabitants to vote in Armenian elections, thus disregarding Soviet authority and Azerbaijani SSR jurisdiction, and causing outrage throughout the republic. This led to demonstrations which demanded the ousting of Azerbaijani communist officials and called for independence from the Soviet Union. Their rhetoric was, according to a Human Rights Watch report, "heavily anti-Armenian". On 12 January, the Popular Front organized a national defence committee with branches in factories and offices in Baku. The aim was to mobilize the population for battle with local Armenians.

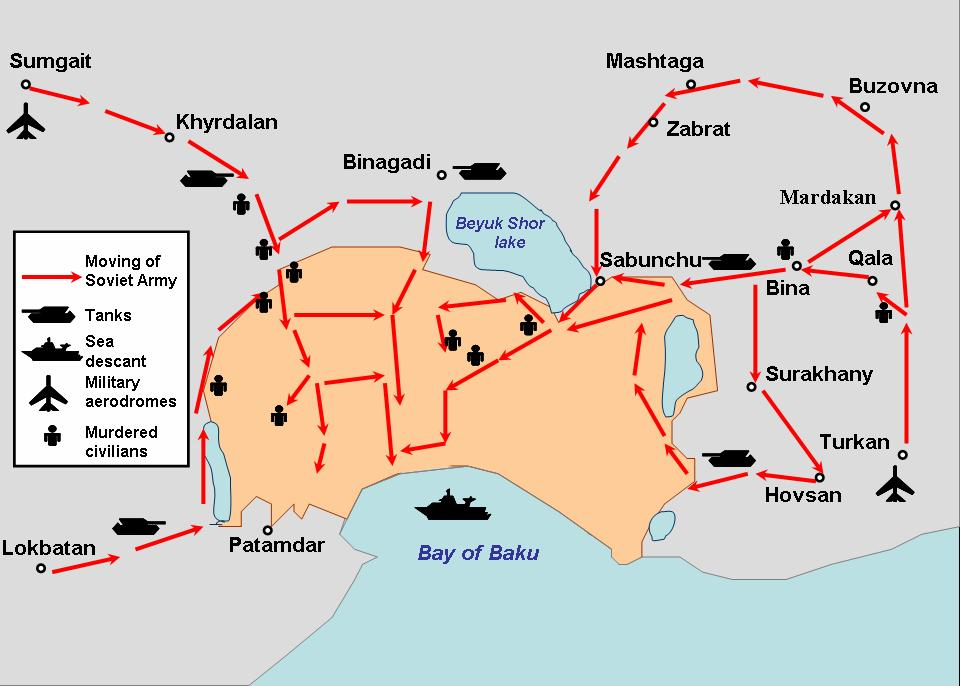
Maneuvers of the Soviet Army in Baku, 20 January 1990

Local Azerbaijani authorities were unable to restore order because of internal quarrelling and divisions that paralyzed their ability to act. Azerbaijani authorities also ordered the 12,000-strong Interior Ministry troops to abstain from intervening in the Baku riots and numerous Soviet army and fleet units of the Baku garrison and Caspian Flotilla did not intervene to stop the riots, claiming that they had no orders from Moscow authorities. On 13 January, anti-Armenian pogrom began in Baku which resulted in 48 deaths, while thousands fled or were evacuated by the Soviet military.

On 15 January, the authorities declared a state of emergency in several parts of Azerbaijan, except Baku. At the same time, fearing an intervention of the central Soviet authorities, Popular Front activists began a blockade of military barracks. They had already taken de facto control in a number of Azerbaijani regions.

On 18 January, the Popular Front ordered supporters to barricade the main access routes into Baku using hundreds of cars, trucks, and buses. The next day, Soviet authorities evacuated its representatives and local officials, moving them to military command posts in the outskirts of the city where Soviet Minister of Defence Dmitry Yazov and Interior Minister Vadim Bakatin were positioned.

On 19 January, the Presidium of the Supreme Soviet of the USSR approved the decree signed by M. Gorbachev, introducing a state of emergency in Baku and some other places in the Azerbaijani SSR. The decree stated:

In connection with a dramatic escalation of the situation in the city of Baku, attempts of criminal extremist forces to remove from power by organizing mass unrest legally acting state authorities and in the interests of the protection and security of citizens, the Presidium of the Supreme Soviet of the USSR, guided by point 14 of the article 119 of the Constitution of the USSR, decrees: To declare since 20 January 1990 state of emergency in the city of Baku, by extending to its territory the effect of the Decree of the Presidium of the Supreme Soviet of the USSR from 15 January 1990.

The decree contravened legal acts in force at the time, which provided that the Presidium of the Supreme Soviet of the AzSSR would have to turn to the central government with the relevant plea.

Late at night on 19 January 1990, after the demolition of the central television station and termination of phone and radio lines by Soviet special forces, 26,000 Soviet troops entered Baku, smashing through the barricades in order to crush the Popular Front. As claimed by Mikhail Gorbachev, gunmen of the Azerbaijani National Front opened fire on the soldiers; however, findings of the Moscow-based non-governmental organization Shield found no evidence of "armed combatants of Azerbaijani Popular Front", which was used as a motive to crush the civilian population on 20 January.

The independent Shield organization which consists of a group of lawyers and officers in reserve, observed human rights violations in the army and its military operations, and concluded that the army waged a war on its civilians and demanded to start a criminal investigation against the Minister of Defence, Dmitry Yazov, who had personally led the operation. The Azerbaijani Interior Ministry officials helped Popular Front activists in stirring disorder by providing them with weapons, technical facilities, and informing them about the movement of army units.

The troops attacked the protesters, firing into the crowds. The shooting continued for three days. They acted pursuant to a state of emergency, which continued for more than four months afterward, declared by the Presidium of the Supreme Soviet of the USSR, signed by Chairman Mikhail Gorbachev. The state of emergency was, however, disclosed to the Azerbaijani public only several hours after the beginning of the offensive, when many citizens already lay dead or wounded in the streets, hospitals and morgues of Baku.

Almost the whole population of Baku turned out to bury the dead on the third day, 22 January. For another 40 days, the country stayed away from work as a sign of mourning and mass protest.

=== Death toll ===
Victims of Black January in Martyrs' Lane, Baku.

According to several sources, between 133 and 137 civilians died with the unofficial number reaching 300. Up to 800 were injured and 5 went missing. An additional 26 people were killed in Neftchala and Lankaran regions of the country.

According to one report, 93 Azerbaijanis and 29 Soviet soldiers were killed in the street skirmishes. Other reports state that 21 soldiers were killed and 90 wounded in the fighting. However, how the soldiers died is still disputed. The soldiers' death toll was claimed by Soviet authorities to have resulted from armed resistance, although some of the soldiers could have been victims of friendly fire.

=== State of emergency ===
General Secretary Gorbachev and other officials asserted that it was necessary to stop pogroms and violence against the Armenian population and to thwart efforts by extremists to overthrow the Soviet Azerbaijani government. The government's decree said: "Extremist groups are organizing mass disorders fanning national enmity. They are committing bold criminal acts, mining roads, and bridges, shelling settlements, taking hostages."

Defence Minister Yazov also said that nationalists were plotting a coup d'état in Azerbaijan: "A meeting was planned at which it was proposed to declare the transfer of power into the hands of the People's Front." He noted how the "Popular Front" declared its own state of emergency in Baku before the action was taken and how Soviet state organs "ceased to control the situation."

== News coverage ==
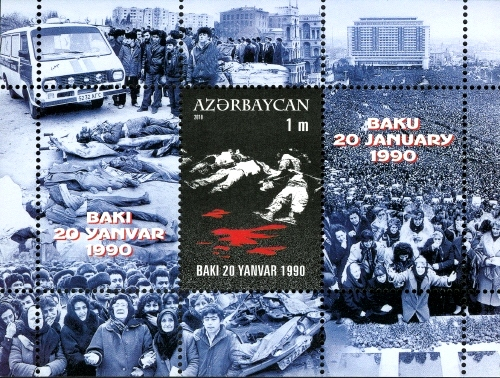
Azerbaijani stamp with photos of Black January

During the Black January crackdown, Soviet authorities managed to suppress all efforts to disseminate news from Azerbaijan to the local population and the international community. On the eve of the military intervention, one of the leaders of Popular Front, Ekhtibar Mamedov, proposed to Kremlin officials that he appear on Azerbaijani TV at 8 PM to announce that the First Secretary of Azerbaijani Communist Party, Abdurrahman Vazirov, would be leaving, and no troops would invade Baku, thus restoring order.

Instead, an energy supply source to Azerbaijani TV and State Radio was blown up by intelligence officers at 7:15 PM in order to cut off the population from any source of information. TV and radio were silent and all print media was banned. But Mirza Khazar and his staff at Radio Free Europe/Radio Liberty succeeded in broadcasting daily reports from Baku, making it the only source of news to Azerbaijanis within and outside of the country for several days. Because of that, the attempt of the Kremlin leadership to keep the outside world and the population inside Azerbaijan unaware of the intervention was foiled and Azerbaijanis in and outside Azerbaijan, as well as the international community, learned about the actions of the Soviet Army and were able to organize a protest.

Shocked by this development, the government of the USSR complained officially to the United States about Radio Liberty's coverage of the military's intervention in Azerbaijan. The 20 January 1990 broadcasts turned Mirza Khazar into a popular figure among Azerbaijanis in and outside Azerbaijan. Malahat Aghajanqizi, a well-known Azerbaijani poet and writer, described Mirza Khazar's appearance on radio at the time of the Soviet military action as follows: "On January 20, Mirza Khazar with his God-given divine voice gave hope to the dying Azerbaijani people."

== Assessment ==
A special session of the Supreme Soviet of the Azerbaijan SSR was held on 22 January 1990 at the request of the public and by the initiative of a group of MPs. It tried to initially assess the 20 January events and adopted some documents condemning the crackdown operation by the Soviet army.

The Memorial Society and Helsinki Watch reported in May 1991 that they had found compelling evidence that the imposition of the state of emergency had led to an unwarranted breach of civil liberties and that Soviet troops had used unjustified force resulting in many deaths. This includes the usage of armored vehicles, bayonets and firing on clearly marked ambulances.

The Human Rights Watch report entitled "Black January in Azerbaijan" states: "Indeed, the violence used by the Soviet Army on the night of January 19–20 was so out of proportion to the resistance offered by Azerbaijanis as to constitute an exercise in collective punishment. Since Soviet officials have stated publicly that the purpose of the intervention of Soviet troops was to prevent the ouster of the Communist-dominated government of the Republic of Azerbaijan by the nationalist-minded, noncommunist opposition, the punishment inflicted on Baku by Soviet soldiers may have been intended as a warning to nationalists, not only in Azerbaijan but in the other republics of the Soviet Union."

"The subsequent events in the Baltic Republics – where, in a remarkable parallel to the events in Baku, the alleged civil disorder was cited as justification for violent intervention by Soviet troops – further confirms that the Soviet Government has demonstrated that it will deal harshly with nationalist movements", continues the Human Rights Watch report.

The Wall Street Journal editorial of 4 January 1995 stated that Gorbachev chose to use violence against "independence-seeking Azerbaijan." When a year later the world press criticized Gorbachev for violent massacres of civilians in Lithuania and Latvia, the Azerbaijani public was embittered by the silence of the world media on Gorbachev's orders a year earlier, during Black January.

=== Independence ===
On 18 October 1991, the Azerbaijan parliament restored the country's independence. On 14 February 1992, the Azerbaijani General Prosecutor's Office instituted a lawsuit targeted at the individuals involved in the massacre. In March 2003, the same lawsuit was targeted at the ex-Soviet president Gorbachev for violating the article 119 of the Soviet Constitution and article 71 of the Constitution of the Azerbaijani SSR. In 1994, the National Assembly of Azerbaijan adopted a full political and legal evaluation of the Black January events. According to the decree of the President of Azerbaijan, Heydar Aliyev from 16 December 1999, all victims of the crackdown were awarded an honorary title of the "Martyr of January 20" (Azerbaijani: 20 yanvar şəhidi).

20 January is marked as Martyrs' Day (or literally, "the Day of the Nationwide Sorrow") in Azerbaijan. In 2025, the 35th anniversary, the commemoration of this and Black January included a 4,000-person flash mob.

== Memorial ==
20 January is recognized as a Day of Mourning and it is commemorated as the Day of Nationwide Sorrow (Azerbaijani: Ümumxalq Hüzn Günü). In January 2010, a memorial for the Black January victims was erected in the Yasamal district of Baku. The monument was designed by Javanshir Dadashov and Azad Agayed, and architect Adalat Mammadov. The opening of the monument took place on 20 January 2010. The President of Azerbaijan Ilham Aliyev and the head of the presidential administration Ramiz Mehdiyev, chief executive of Yasamal Ibrahim Mehdiyev, and families of the victims of the tragedy attended the ceremony. The total area of the complex is 1,500 square metres (16,000 sq ft). The height of the monument and pedestal is 8 metres (26 ft). The memorial depicts a group of people who are determined not to miss armed troops coming into the city, with some of them already fallen.

== See also ==
- April 9 tragedy
- History of Azerbaijan
- History of the Soviet Union
- January 1991 events in Latvia
- January Events (Lithuania)
- Jeltoqsan
- List of massacres in Azerbaijan
- Singing Revolution
