= Bloody January =

Bloody January may refer to:

- Bloody January of Banat in German-Occupied Serbia 1942,
- Black January in Azerbaijan 1990,
- January Events in Lithuania 1991,
- January Events in Kazakhstan 2022,
