= January 20 (monument) =

Coordinates: 40°24′13″N 49°48′25″E

January 20 (Azerbaijani: 20 Yanvar) is a monument complex located in the city of Baku, Azerbaijan. İt was built in memory of the victims of January 20, 1990. The monument was erected on the territory of the Yasamal district, near the "January 20" ring road.

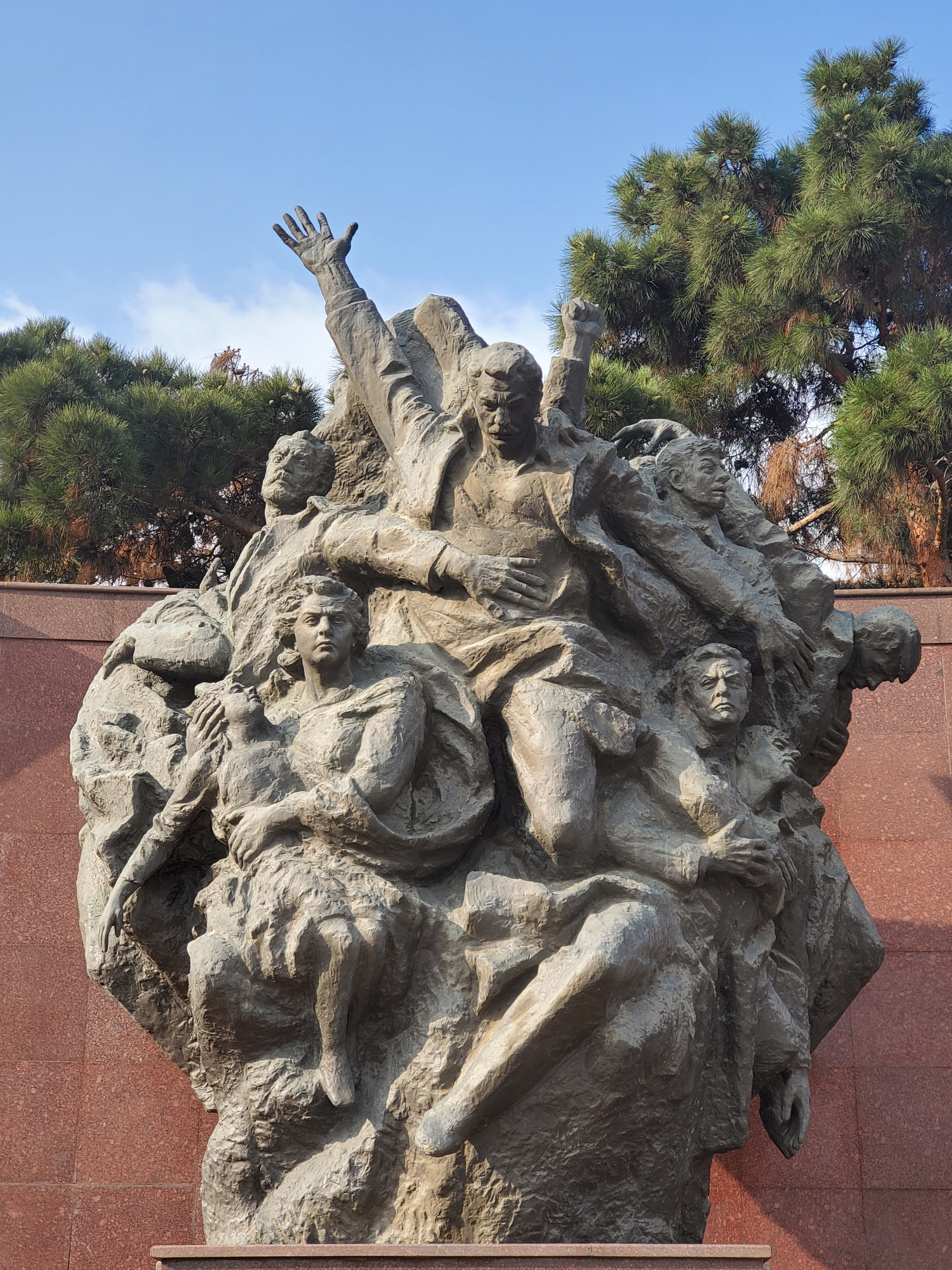
The monument

== History ==
The construction of the January 20 memorial complex began in October 2009. The opening of the monument took place on January 20, 2010. The president, Ilham Aliyev; the head of the presidential administration, Ramiz Mehdiyev; deputies of the National Assembly of Azerbaijan; and the head of the executive power of the Yasamal district, Ibrahim Mehdiyev, as well as families of victims of the tragedy attended the ceremony.

== Architecture ==
The wall of the complex is covered with granite. The creators of the monument were the sculptors Javanshir Dadashov and Azad Aliyev and the architect Adalat Mamedov. The total area of the complex is 1,500 square metres (16,000 sq ft). The height of the monument, along with its pedestal, is 8 metres (26 ft). Names of 147 victims of the tragedy were carved on the granite pedestal of the monument with gold letters. Also, the words of Heydar Aliyev were written on the pedestal:

The day of January 20, 1990, entered the history of Azerbaijan as one of the most tragic days, and became a page of heroism of our people.
