= İstisu, Ismailli =

İstisu
- Municipality
- Location within Azerbaijan
- Coordinates: 40°56′47″N 48°04′33″E
- Country: Azerbaijan
- Rayon: Ismailli

Population
  - Total: 990
- Time zone: UTC+4 (AZT)
  - Summer (DST): UTC+5 (AZT)

İstisu is a village and municipality in the Ismailli Rayon of Azerbaijan. It has a population of 990. The municipality consists of the villages of İstisu and Çayqovuşan.
