= Çayqovuşan, Ismailli =

Village in Ismailli, Azerbaijan

Çayqovuşan
- Location within Azerbaijan
- Coordinates: 40°56′N 48°05′E
- Country: Azerbaijan
- Rayon: Ismailli
- Municipality: İstisu
- Time zone: UTC+4 (AZT)
  - Summer (DST): UTC+5 (AZT)

Çayqovuşan (also, Chaykovushan) is a village in the Ismailli Rayon of Azerbaijan. The village forms part of the municipality of İstisu.
