= İstisu, Lankaran =

İstisu
- Location within Azerbaijan
- Coordinates: 38°47′44″N 48°43′54″E
- Country: Azerbaijan
- Rayon: Lankaran
- Time zone: UTC+4 (AZT)
  - Summer (DST): UTC+5 (AZT)

İstisu (known as Kirovsk and Kirov until 1999) is a village and municipality in the Lankaran Rayon of Azerbaijan. It has a population of 3,038.
