= Əzgilli =

Əzgilli or Ezgilly or Azgilli or Azgilo or Ezgilli may refer to:

- Əzgilli, Goygol, Azerbaijan
- Əzgilli, Zaqatala, Azerbaijan
