= Kalbajar =

Kalbajar Kəlbəcər
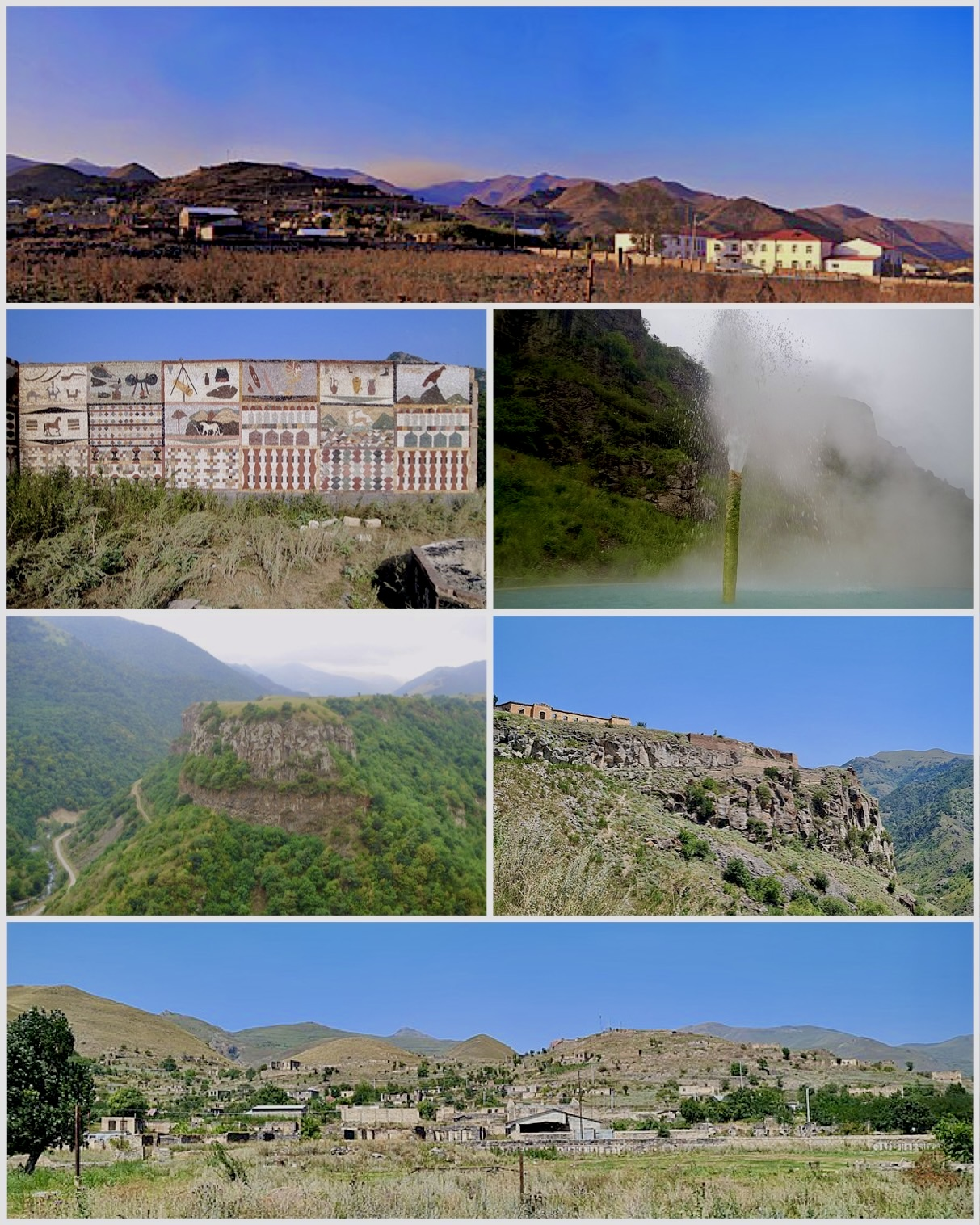
- From top left: Panorama of the city; Kalbajar Museum; Mineral hot spring in Kalbajar; Dashtak gorge; Mountains of Kalbajar; General view of the city

- Location within Azerbaijan Location within East Zangezur Economic Region
- Coordinates: 40°06′24″N 46°02′18″E
- Country: Azerbaijan
- District: Kalbajar
- Elevation: 1,584 m (5,197 ft)

Population (2015)
  - Total: 600
- Time zone: UTC+4 (AZT)

Kalbajar (Azerbaijani: Kəlbəcər; Armenian: Քարվաճառ, romanized: Karvachar) is a city and the capital of the Kalbajar District of Azerbaijan. Located in the Tartar Valley, it is 458 kilometres (285 mi) away from the country's capital city Baku.

Before the First Nagorno-Karabakh War, the city had a population of 7,246 people. It was captured by Armenia on 2 April 1993, after which its Azerbaijani population was expelled and replaced with Armenians. As part of the 2020 Nagorno-Karabakh ceasefire agreement, which ended the Second Nagorno-Karabakh War, it was returned to Azerbaijan on 25 November of that year.

== Etymology ==
The name Kalbajar is a modified form of K’aravachar’/K’arvachar’ (Քարավաճառ). The Armenian name is popularly interpreted as meaning "a place for selling rocks", as if consisting of the elements k’ar ('rock') and vachar’ ('sale, selling'). A less likely proposal considers k’ar to mean 'fortress' in this case or to be a prefix meaning settlement found in the names of some ancient Near Eastern cities.

According to Azerbaijani sources, the name evolved from Kevlicher, meaning 'fortress in the upper reaches of the rivers' (kevli – 'the upper reaches of the river,' cher/jar – 'fortress') in Old Turkic. According to another version, the name of the town comes from the combination of the Persian word kevil ('cave') and the Turkic word jer ("rock, ravine") and means 'ravine with caves'. Another version proposes that the name comes from the Turkic words kevli ('river mouths') and jar ("gorge, ravine"), and that the settlement was called Keblajar before purportedly morphing to Kalbajar. These three etymologies, however, are linguistically unconvincing.

== History ==
=== Early history ===
In ancient times, the territory where modern-day Kalbajar is located was part of the county (gavar’) of Tsar of the Artsakh province within the Kingdom of Armenia. Archaeological evidence uncovered in 1924 by Soviet archaeologist and scholar of the Caucasus Yevgenia Pchelina attests to the existence of an Armenian settlement in the area during the Middle Ages.

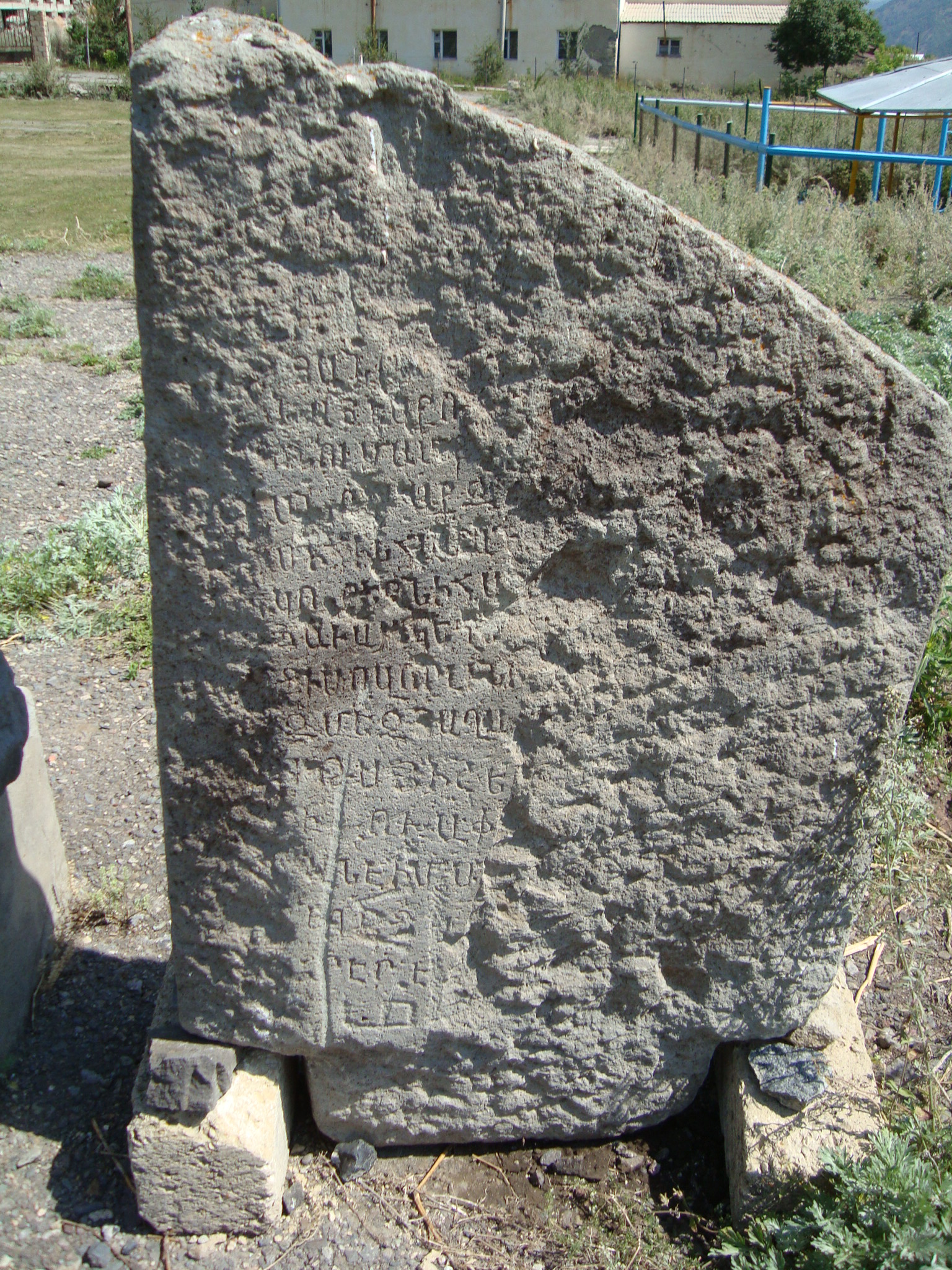
Stone with Classical Armenian inscription found in the village

The settlement is mentioned by Armenian sources in the 15th century as the village of K’aravachar’ (17th-century and later Armenian sources spell it K’arvachar’). It is first mentioned in the colophon of an Armenian manuscript dated to 1402:

… in the archdiocese of this province of Father Zakaria, abbot of Dadivank, in the famous region of Tsar, in the village of Karavachar …

According to Armenian historian Samvel Karapetyan, its population likely consisted of Armenians until the 1730s. In the mid-18th century, Kalbajar was again incorporated into the province of Khachen as a part of the newly-formed Karabakh Khanate. In the mid-19th century, the area was settled by Kurds, and the settlement's name was distorted from Kar(a)vachar to Kyarvajar or Kyalbajar. Kurdish folk tales from the region, recorded by Pchelina, speak of the arrival of the Kurds in the region and the subsequent displacement of the historical Armenian population.

In 1930, the Kalbajar region with an area of 1,936 km^{2} (747 sq mi) was formed as part of the Azerbaijan SSR, the administrative centre of was the town of Kalbajar, which received the status of a city in 1980.

=== Red Kurdistan ===
The city was part of the Kurdistansky Uyezd (later called the Kurdistan Okrug) of the Azerbaijani SSR from 7 July 1923 to 23 July 1930. To its Kurdish population, it was known as Kevn Bajar.

=== Battle of Kalbajar ===
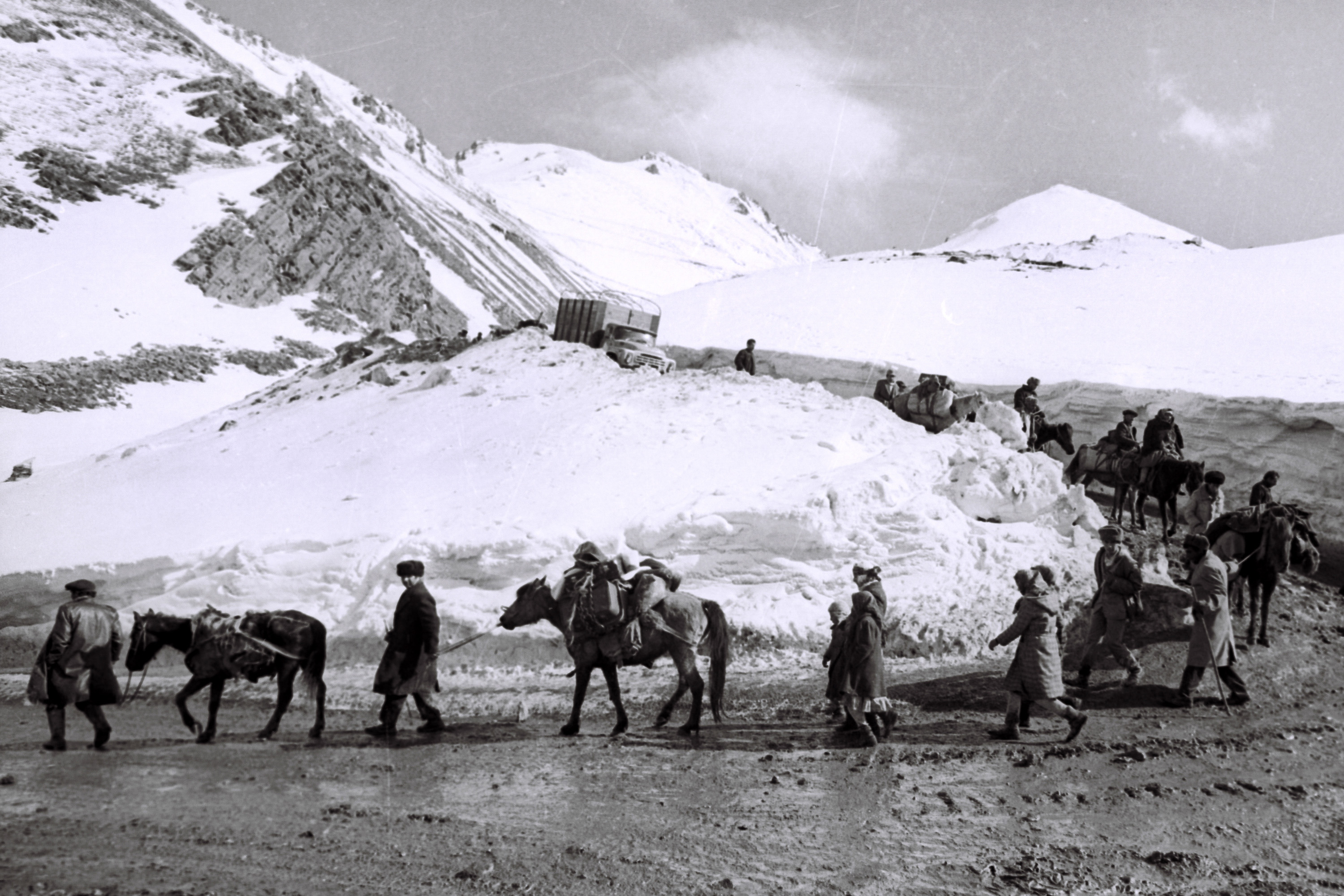
Displaced Azerbaijanis from Kalbajar

The city was seized by Armenian forces on 2 April 1993 during the Battle of Kalbajar, near the end of the First Nagorno-Karabakh War and all of its Azerbaijani inhabitants were forced out. Civilians reported being forced to flee through mountains still covered in snow, resulting in hundreds freezing to death.

Human Rights Watch findings concluded that during the Kalbajar offensive Armenian forces committed numerous violations of the rules of war, including forcible exodus of civilian population, indiscriminate fire and hostage-taking. In April 1993, the United Nations Security Council adopted Resolution 822 which called for the withdrawal of all occupying forces from the Kalbajar district, including the town of Kalbajar.

=== Armenian occupation ===
Following the war, the city and surrounding territory were absorbed into the breakaway Republic of Artsakh becoming the centre of its Shahumyan Province and was renamed K’arvachar’. Starting in the early 2000s, the city was slowly repopulated by ethnic Armenians from the eastern areas of Shahumyan and Gulistan; they had fled during the First Nagorno-Karabakh War after they had been forcefully expelled by Azerbaijani forces and the aforementioned settlements had been taken under control by Azerbaijan.

Infrastructure was thereafter rebuilt and the town had electricity and a nearby highway connecting it to Armenia. In 2018, the town's school had 177 schoolchildren.

An OSCE Fact-Finding Mission visited the occupied territories in 2005 to inspect settlement activity in the area and report its findings to the Co-Chairs of the OSCE Minsk Group. According to FFM figures, at that time the number of Armenian settlers in the Kalbajar District was approximately 1,500, of which about 450–500 lived in Kalbajar proper. FFM reported that "housing conditions were basic and no more than 20 to 30 percent of the ruins were reconstructed, usually in a crude and make-shift manner. Some were without glass windows and were only heated by a small wood-burning stove". According to 2013 local estimates, which the historian and political scientist Laurence Broers considers plausible, the city had some 700 inhabitants at the time while the larger, namesake district had a total of 3,000 inhabitants.

From 2014 to 2020, the city maintained ties with Pico Rivera, California as a friendship city.

=== Return to Azerbaijani control ===
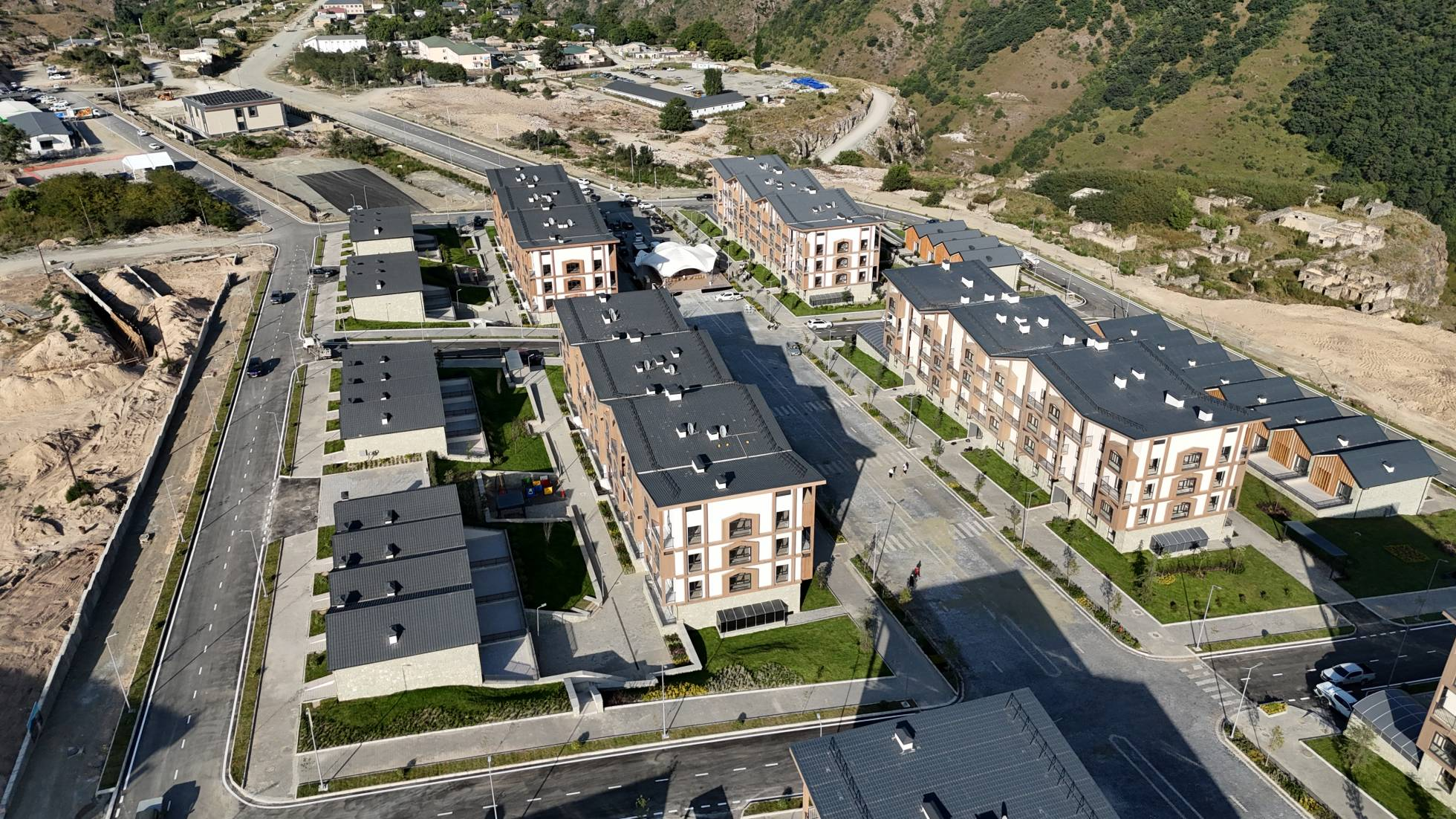
Kalbajar in August 2025

As part of an agreement that ended the 2020 Nagorno-Karabakh war, the town and its surrounding district were initially to be returned to Azerbaijani control by 15 November 2020, but this deadline was subsequently extended to 25 November 2020. The city, along with the district were returned to Azerbaijan on 25 November 2020.

Following the end of the 2020 Nagorno-Karabakh war, Armenian armed forces and civilians began to leave the Kalbajar area on 11 November 2020 in preparation for the handover of the town to Azerbaijani control on 15 November 2020. It was reported that some residents were burning their own homes, schools and forests and were cutting fruit trees and downing power lines prior to the handover. In the days leading up to the return to Azerbaijani control, there was heavy traffic on the road leading into the area as residents rushed to leave while other Armenians rushed to visit the nearby 9th century Dadivank monastery one last time before the border closed.

On 16 August 2021, the Azerbaijani president Ilham Aliyev visited the city and hoisted the flag of Azerbaijan in the city. In September of the same year, the building of the military prosecutor's office and a bakery were opened in Kalbajar. On 26 June 2022, the foundation of the İstisu mineral water plant was laid in Kalbajar.

== Historical heritage sites ==
Historical heritage sites in and around the town include a petroglyph, a medieval oil mill, a khachkar from 916, and tombstones from between the 13th and 17th centuries.

== Demographics ==
| Year | Population | Ethnic groups | Source |
|---|---|---|---|
| 1912 | 300 | 100% Tatars (later known as Azerbaijanis) | Caucasian Calendar |
| 1939 | 1,089 | 88.3% Azerbaijani, 5.1% Russians, 3.9% Armenians | Soviet Census |
| 1970 | 4,775 | 98.4% Azerbaijani, 0.5% Armenian, 0.4% Russian, | Soviet Census |
| 1979 | 5,604 | 99.4% Azerbaijani, 0.1% Armenian, 0.1% Russian | Soviet Census |
| 1989 | 7,246 | | Soviet Census |
| 2015 | 600 | | NKR Census |

== Transportation ==
- Toghanali–Kalbajar–Istisu highway
- Murovdagh Tunnel

== Gallery ==
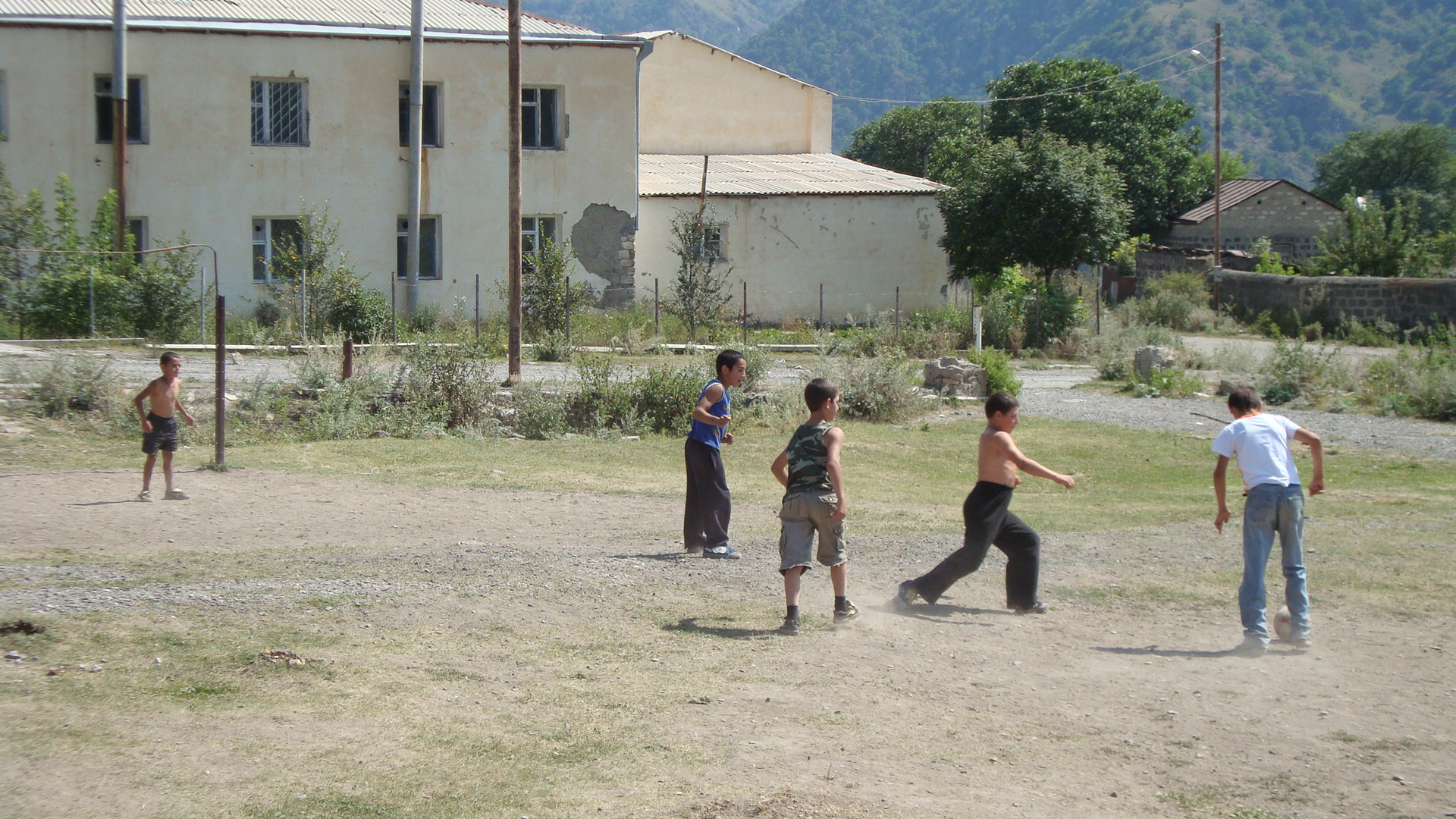
Children playing football (2010)

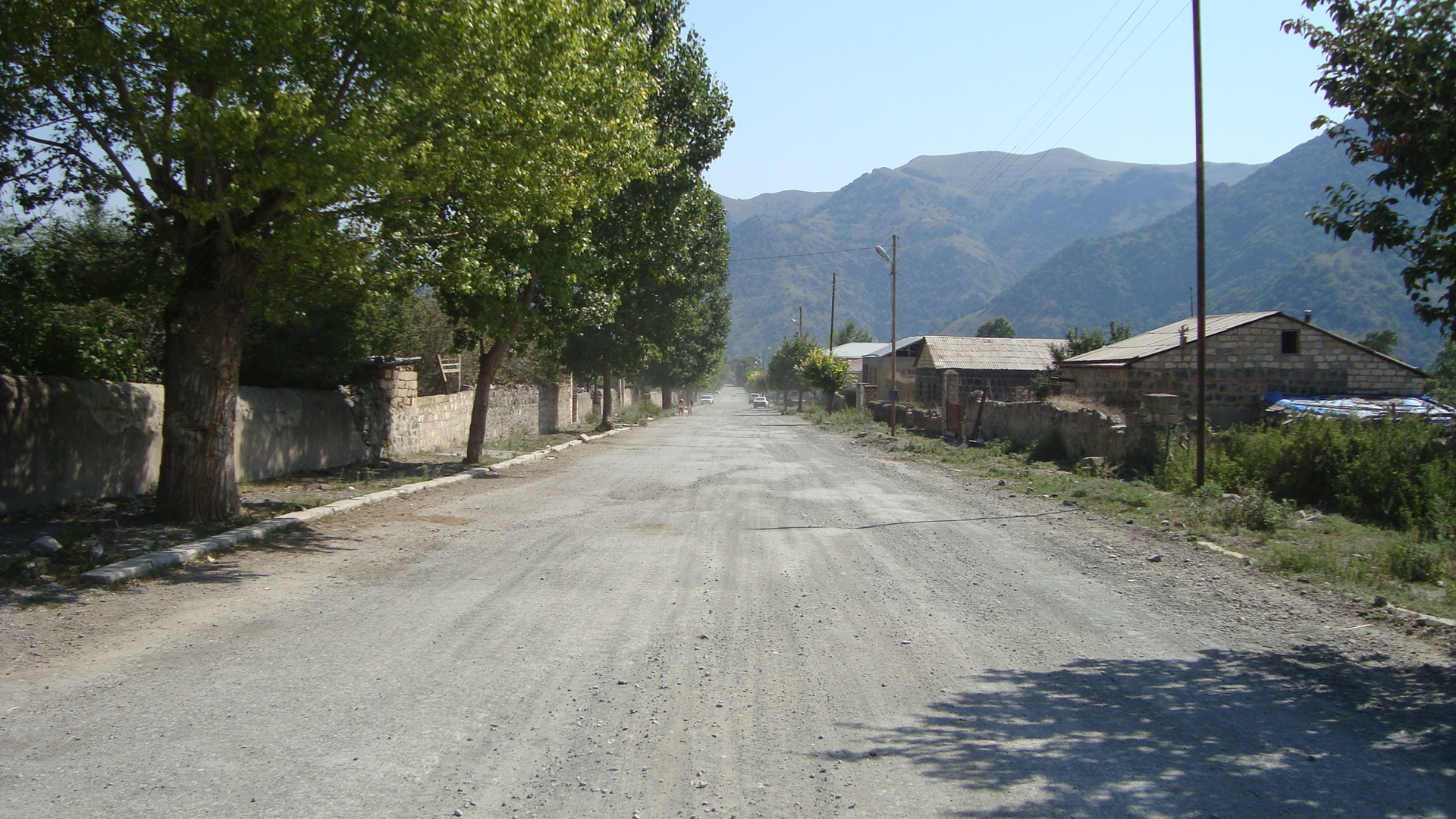
Street in Kalbajar (2010)

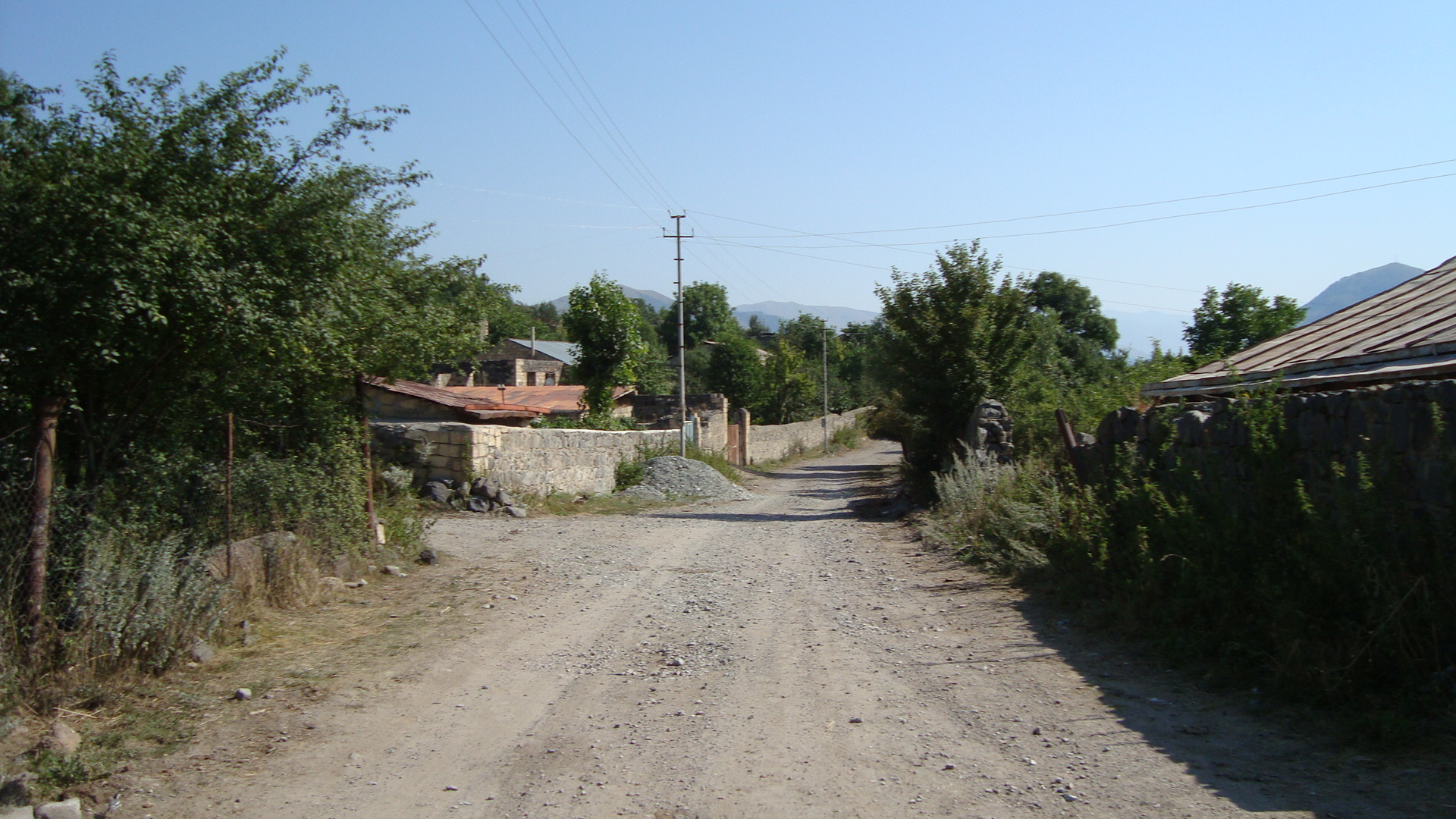
Street in Kalbajar (2010)

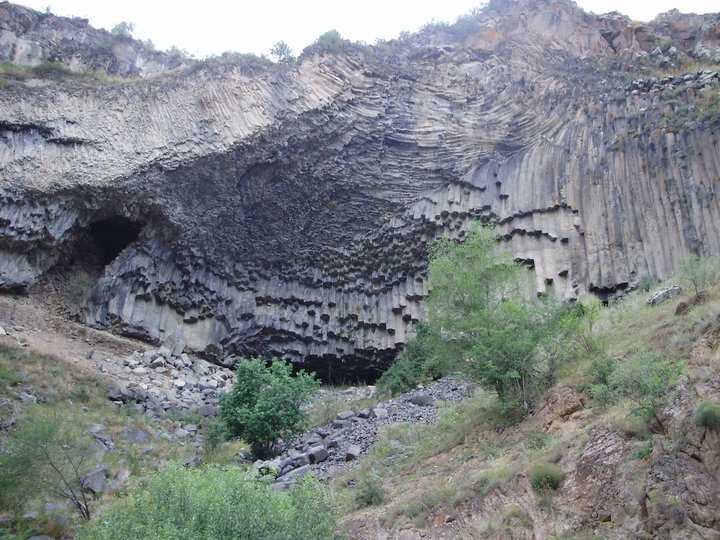
Basalt columns and caves near Kalbajar, locally known as "rock symphony"

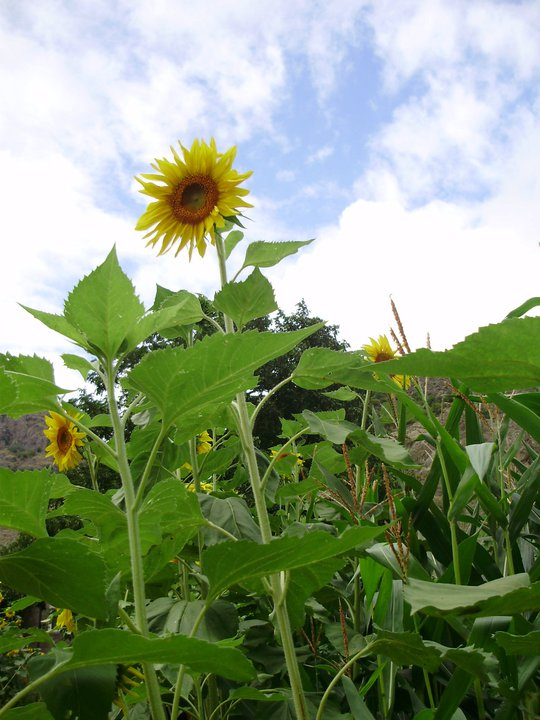
Sunflowers in the countryside

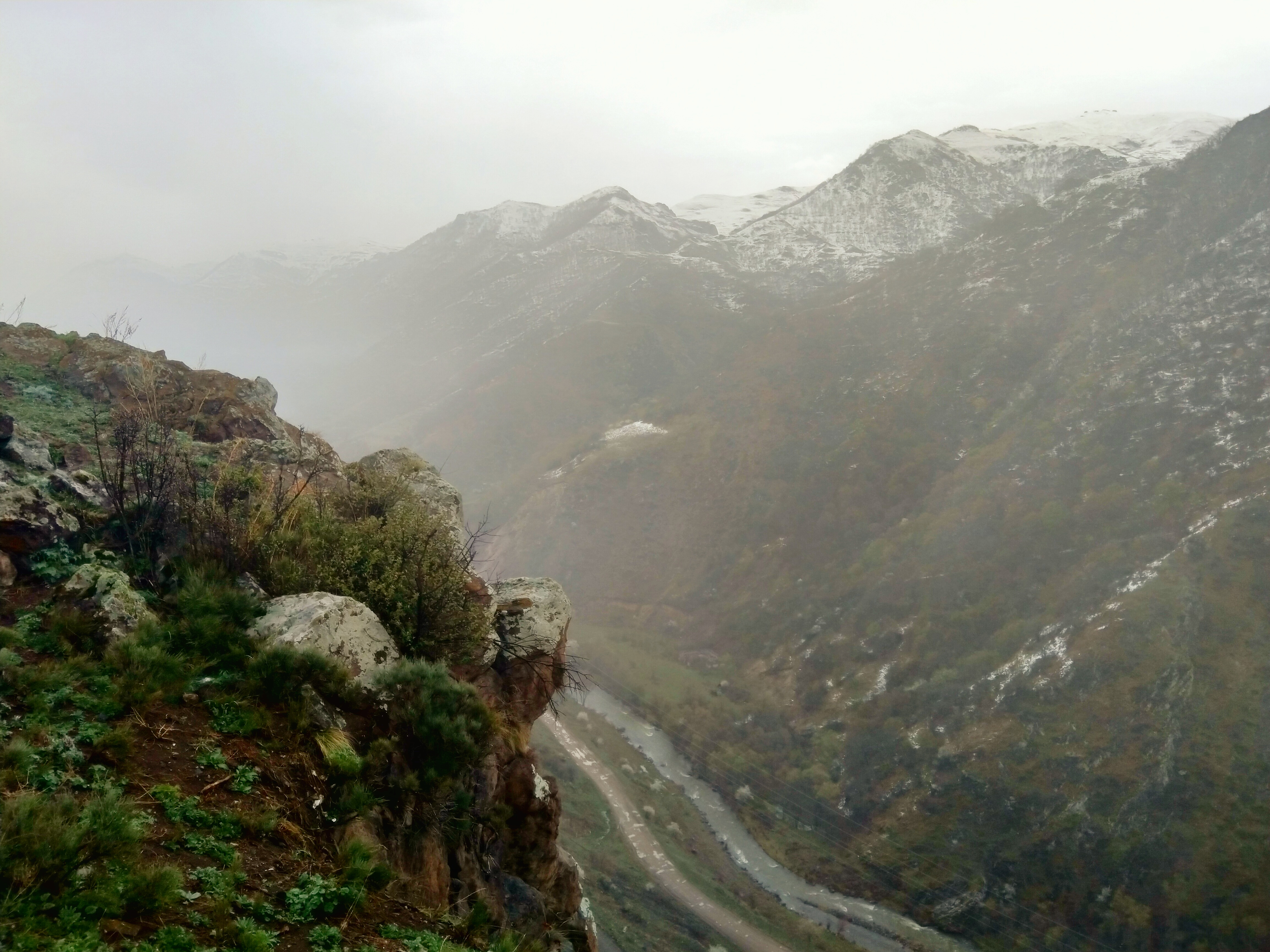
Dashtak Gorge on the Tartar River, from Kalbajar

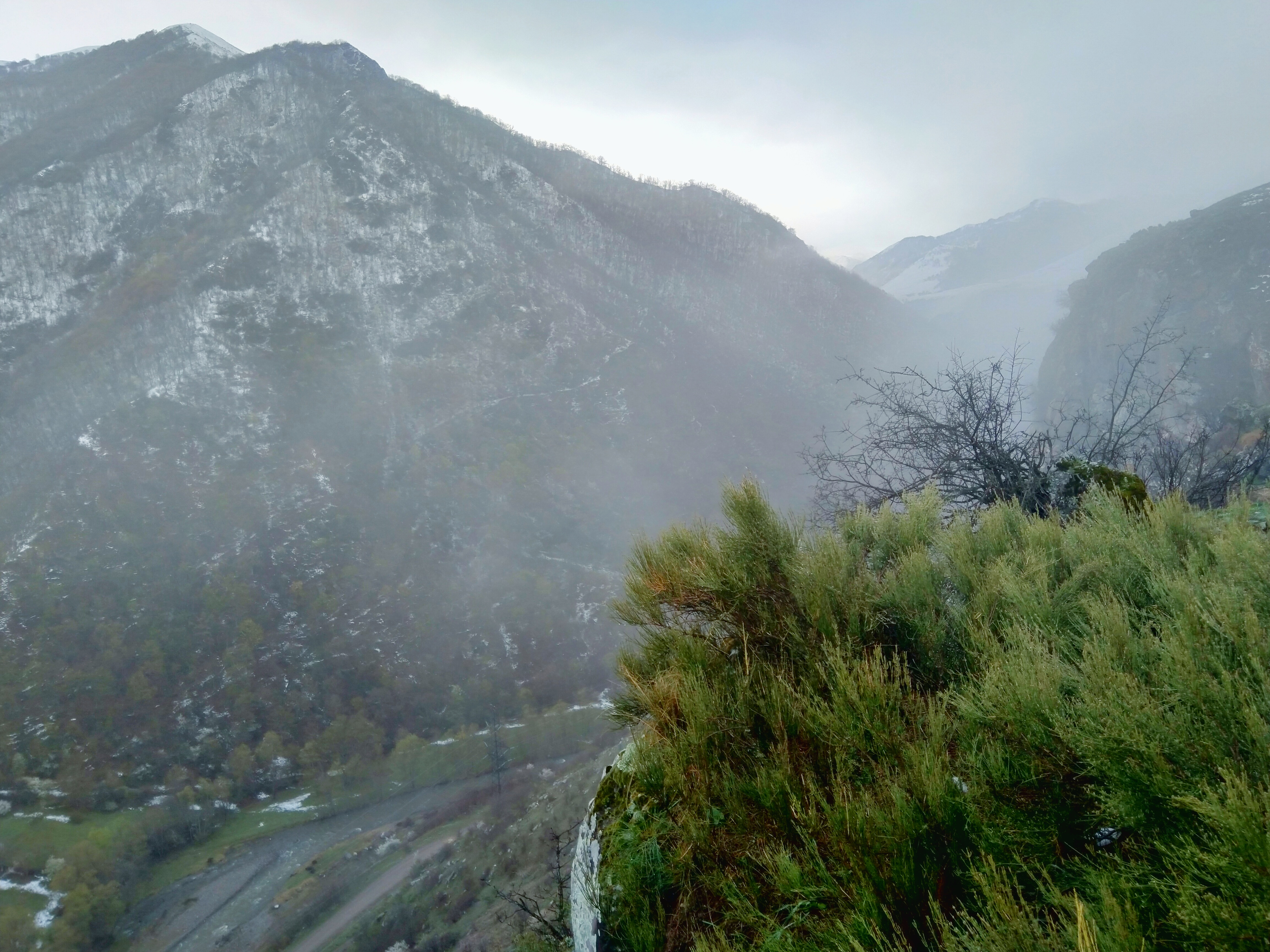
Dashtak Gorge near Kalbajar

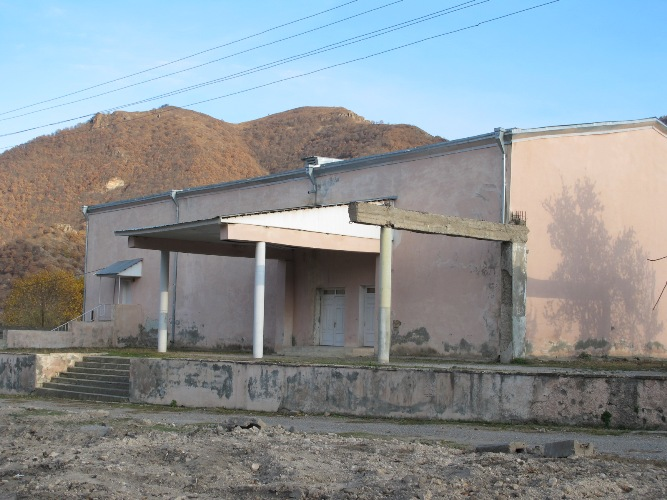
Cultural Center in Kalbajar, under construction
