= Toghanali–Kalbajar–Istisu highway =

Highway under construction in Azerbaijan

Route information
- Length: 80.7 km (50.1 mi)
- Existed: 23 July 2021–present

Major junctions
- NW end: Toghanali (Goygol District)
- SE end: Istisu (Kalbajar District)

Location
- Country: Azerbaijan

Highway system
- Roads in Azerbaijan

Toghanali–Kalbajar–Istisu highway (Azerbaijani: Toğanalı–Kəlbəcər–İstisu avtomobil yolu) is a highway under construction in Azerbaijan. The route starts from the village of Toghanali in the Goygol District and is planned to continue through the Kalbajar District towards the town of Kalbajar and the Istisu settlement, crossing mountainous terrain associated with the Murovdagh range.

The project length is 80.7 km. The highway is being built to technical categories I–II with 2–4 lanes depending on terrain; in steep mountain sections the design provides a two-lane carriageway with additional climbing lanes where required, while segments with major structures are planned with wider cross-sections.

== History and construction ==
Large-scale construction of the highway began on 23 July 2021.

A key element of the corridor is the Murovdagh Tunnel, designed to pass beneath the Murovdagh range where elevations rise from about 1,700 m to over 3,200 m and where winter snow and frost can affect passability on surface alignments. The tunnel is planned as a twin (paired) road tunnel with two lanes per direction and a length of about 11.6 km, providing an alternative to a longer mountain-road segment on difficult relief.

In addition to the Murovdagh Tunnel, multiple other tunnels are planned along the highway, and the project includes associated works such as reconstructed junctions, connecting roads, and slope-stabilisation measures in mountainous terrain.

Construction of the Murovdagh Tunnel and related highway works has been carried out by the Azerbaijan State Agency of Automobile Roads' "No. 3 Main Roads Maintenance" LLC together with Turkish contractors. The project scope also includes drainage and bridge works along the newly built alignment, including circular culverts and new road bridges in required locations.

== See also ==
- Murovdagh Tunnel
- Transport in Azerbaijan
