= Toğanalı =

- Municipality
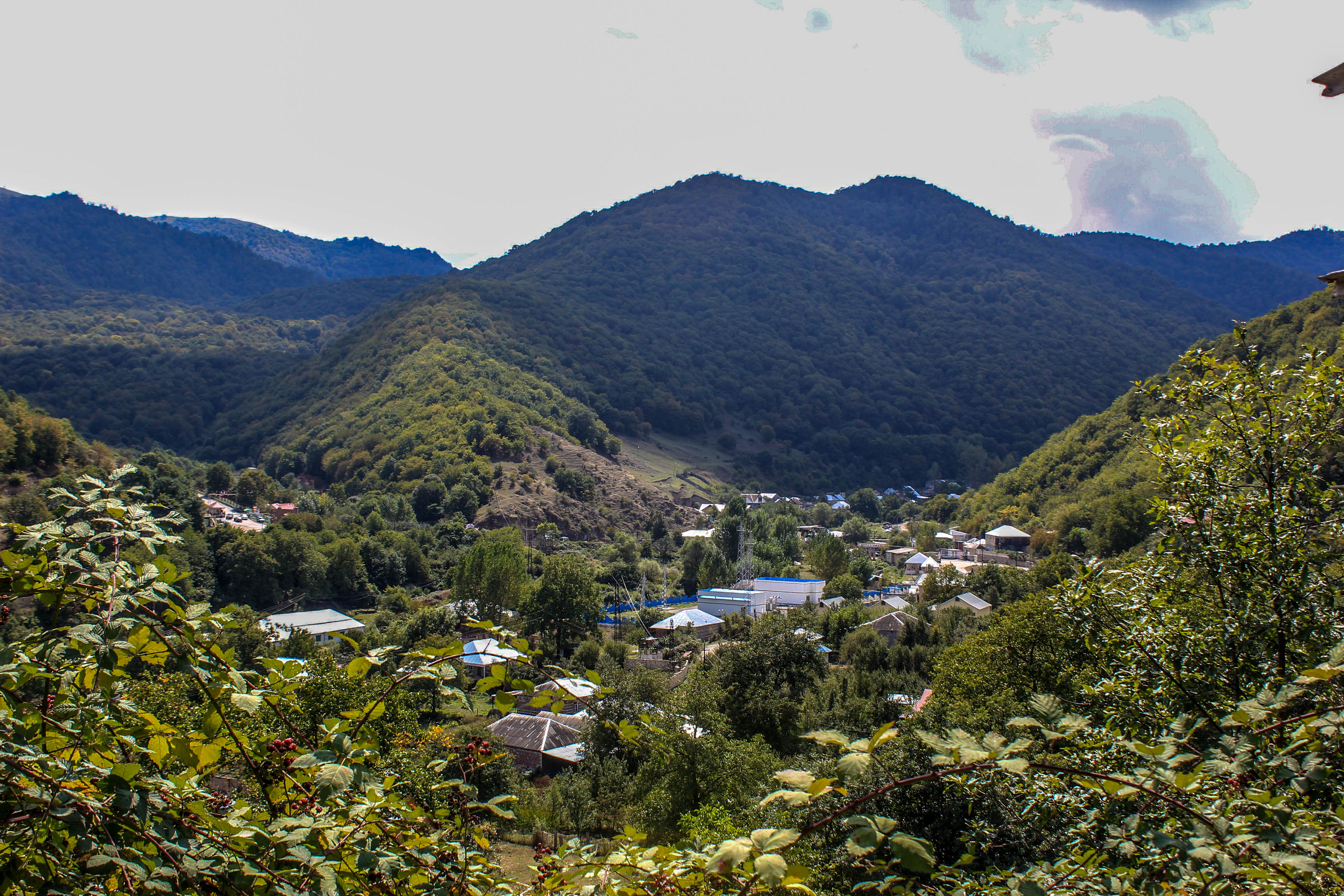
- Toğanalı, turn-off to Lake Göygöl

- Location within Azerbaijan
- Coordinates: 40°25′38″N 46°18′49″E
- Country: Azerbaijan
- Rayon: Goygol

Population
  - Total: 989
- Time zone: UTC+4 (AZT)
  - Summer (DST): UTC+5 (AZT)

Toğanalı (also, Toganaly and Toganly) is a village and municipality in the Goygol Rayon of Azerbaijan. It has a population of 989. The municipality consists of the villages of Toğanalı and Əzgilli.

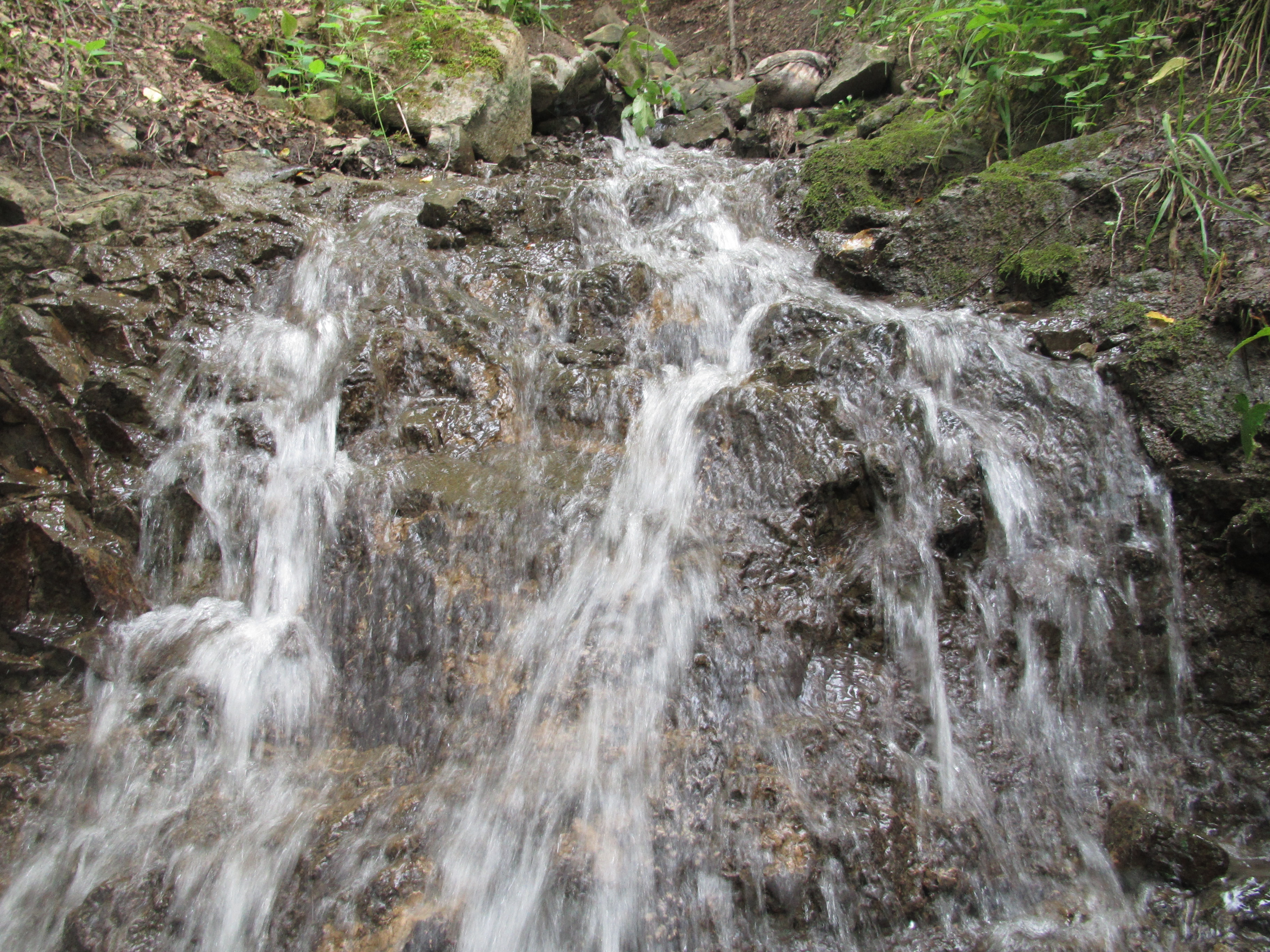
Waterfall in the village

== Transport ==
Toghanali–Kalbajar–Istisu highway
