= Murovdagh Tunnel =

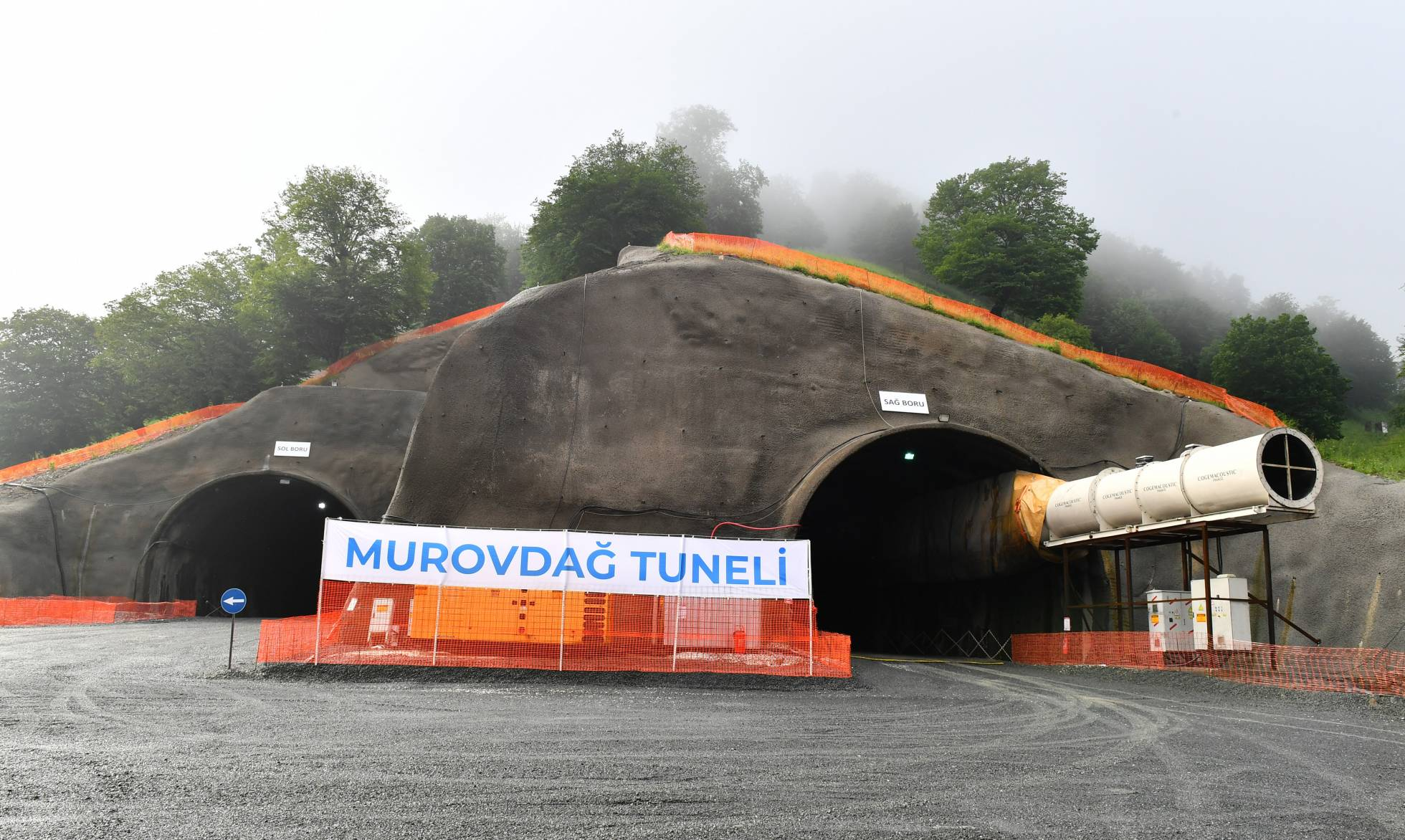
- Construction of the tunnel portals

Overview
- Official name: Azerbaijani: Murovdağ tuneli
- Location: Goygol District, Kalbajar District, Azerbaijan
- Status: Under construction
- Route: Toghanali–Kalbajar–Istisu highway
- Crosses: Murovdagh Range

Operation
- Work began: 16 August 2021
- Opened: 2025 (planned)
- Traffic: Road

Technical
- Length: 11.658 metres (38.2 ft)
- No. of lanes: 2 × 2
- Width: 10 m

The Murovdagh Tunnel (Azerbaijani: Murovdağ tuneli) is a twin road tunnel under construction on the Toghanali–Kalbajar–Istisu highway in Azerbaijan. It passes beneath the Murovdagh Range, connecting the Goygol and Kalbajar districts and serving as an alternative to the high and difficult Omar Pass.

== Background and construction ==
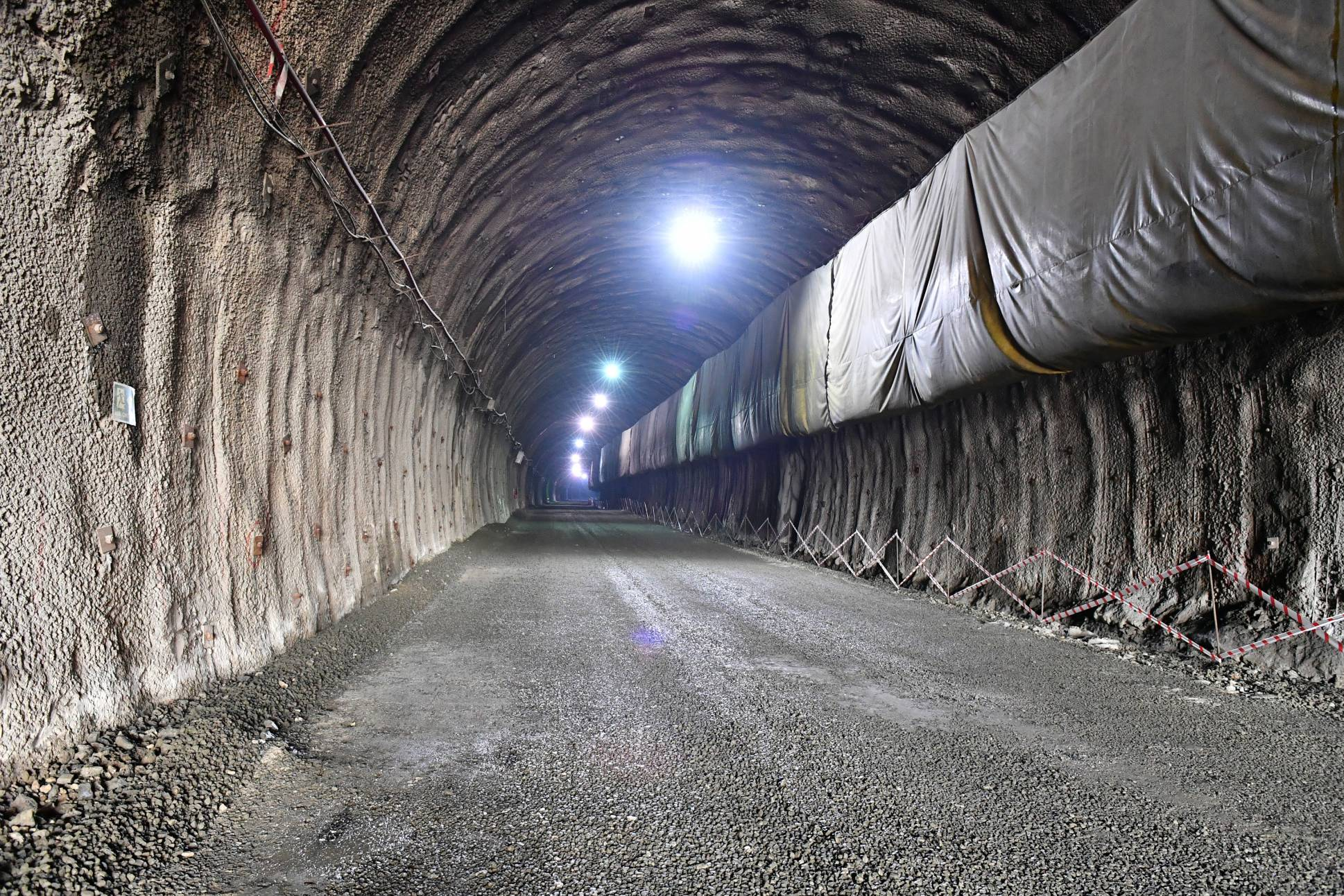
Murovdag Tunnel under construction

The tunnel is located around the 13.5 km point of the Toghanali–Kalbajar–Istisu highway, where the terrain rises sharply from about 1,700 metres to more than 3,200 metres above sea level. Instead of building a 31.5 km stretch of road over the ridge, the alignment was redesigned so that this section crosses the mountain range through the Murovdagh Tunnel. The tunnel will have two traffic lanes in each direction and a cross-section width of about 10 metres. With a planned length of 11,658 metres, it is expected to be among the longest road tunnels in the world.

Construction of the twin tunnel started on 16 August 2021. On 21 August 2025 a technical opening of the tunnel was held with the participation of the Ilham Aliyev and Mehriban Aliyeva.

Within the Toghanali–Kalbajar–Istisu road project, five tunnels are being built; their total length will reach about 26 kilometres, and the Murovdagh Tunnel will be the longest of them. As of September 2024, works on excavation, lining, slope stabilization, retaining walls and related engineering structures were reported to be significantly advanced, with overall road construction progress at 67.5%.
