= Əzgilli, Zaqatala =

Əzgilli
- Location within Azerbaijan Location within Shaki-Zagatala Economic Region
- Coordinates: 41°34′10″N 46°51′30″E
- Country: Azerbaijan
- Rayon: Zaqatala
- Time zone: UTC+4 (AZT)
  - Summer (DST): UTC+5 (AZT)

Əzgilli (also, Azgilo, Ezgilli, and Ezgilly) is a former village in the Zaqatala Rayon of Azerbaijan.
