= Əzgilli, Goygol =

Əzgilli
- Location within Azerbaijan
- Coordinates: 40°24′44″N 46°17′15″E
- Country: Azerbaijan
- Rayon: Goygol
- Municipality: Toğanalı
- Time zone: UTC+4 (AZT)
  - Summer (DST): UTC+5 (AZT)

Əzgilli (also, Ezgilly) is a village in the Goygol Rayon of Azerbaijan. The village forms part of the municipality of Toğanalı.
