= Azerbaijani Armed Forces =

Military forces of Azerbaijan

- Azərbaycan Silahlı Qüvvələri
- Coat of arms of the Azerbaijan Armed Forces
- Founded: 26 June 1918
- Current form: 9 October 1991
- Service branches: Azerbaijani Land Forces; Azerbaijani Navy; Azerbaijani Air Force
- Headquarters: Baku
- Website: mod.gov.az

Leadership
- Commander-in-Chief: President Ilham Aliyev
- Defence Minister: Colonel General Zakir Hasanov
- Chief of General Staff: Colonel General Karim Valiyev

Personnel
- Military age: 18 years
- Conscription: 12–18 months for ground forces
- Active personnel: 68,200
- Reserve personnel: 300,000
- Deployed personnel: 2 (UNMISS)

Expenditure
- Budget: $5.0 billion (2025)
- Percent of GDP: 5.26%

Industry
- Domestic suppliers: Azerbaijan * Azerbaijan Defense Industry * State Border Service Naval Shipyard * Azersilah * RPE Iglim * Radiogurashdirma * RPE Neftgazavtomat * RPE Automatic Lines * Avia-Agregat * Azad Systems
- Foreign suppliers: Israel; Turkey; Serbia; Pakistan; Russia; Belarus; United Kingdom; United States; Ukraine; Brazil; European Union; South Africa

Related articles
- History: Military history of Azerbaijan; Azerbaijan Democratic Republic; Armenian–Azerbaijani War (1918–1920); Battle of Baku (1918); Azerbaijan during World War II; Nagorno-Karabakh conflict First Nagorno-Karabakh War; 2016 Nagorno-Karabakh conflict Second Nagorno-Karabakh War (Operation Iron Fist)
- Ranks: Military ranks of Azerbaijan

The Azerbaijani Armed Forces (Azerbaijani: Azərbaycan Silahlı Qüvvələri) is the military of the Republic of Azerbaijan. It was re-established according to the country's Law of the Armed Forces on 9 October 1991. The original Azerbaijan Democratic Republic's armed forces were dissolved after Azerbaijan was absorbed into the Soviet Union as the Azerbaijan Soviet Socialist Republic from 28 April 1920. After the Soviet Union dissolved in 1991–92, Azerbaijan's armed forces were reformed based on the Soviet bases and equipment left on Azerbaijani soil.

The armed forces have three main branches: the Azerbaijani Land Forces, the Azerbaijani Air Forces and the Azerbaijani Navy. Associated forces include the Azerbaijani National Guard, the Internal Troops of Azerbaijan, and the State Border Service, which can be involved in state defense under certain circumstances.

In the early 21st century, Azerbaijan began extensive modernization and capacity expansion programs, with the military budget increasing from around $300 million in 2005 to $2.46 billion in 2009. The total armed forces number 57,800 personnel in the land forces, 8,650 personnel in the air force and air defence force, and 1,750 personnel in the navy. In 2008 there were also estimated to be 19,500 personnel in the National Guard, State Border Service, and Internal Troops. In addition, there are 300,000 former service personnel who have had military service in the last 15 years. The land forces of Azerbaijan have 547 main battle tanks, 333 infantry fighting vehicles, 506 armored personnel carriers and 1,345 artillery pieces. The air force has about 52 combat-capable aircraft and 47 attack helicopters.

In Nagorno-Karabakh and the surrounding region, the Azerbaijani armed forces are repeatedly involved in fighting, especially with neighboring Armenia (e.g., the Nagorno-Karabakh war in 2020 and the blockade of the Republic of Artsakh in 2022-23).

According to the Azerbaijani media sources, the military expenditure of Azerbaijan for 2009 was set at US$2.46 billion. However, according to Stockholm International Peace Research Institute, only $1.473 billion was spent that year. IISS also suggests that the defence budget in 2009 was $1.5 billion. The Ministry of Defence Industry of Azerbaijan supervises the design, manufacturing, regulation and maintenance of military equipment. In the future, Azerbaijan hopes to start building tanks, armored vehicles, military planes and military helicopters.

== History of the Azerbaijani armed forces ==
=== Azerbaijan Democratic Republic ===
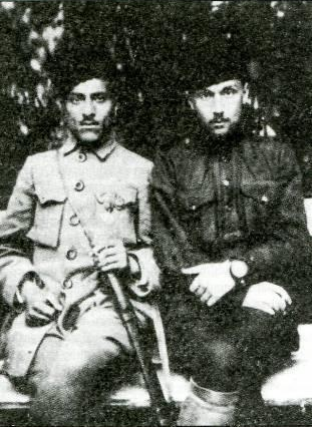
Two Azerbaijani soldiers, members of the Guba military unit of Azerbaijan Democratic Republic (1919)

The history of the modern Azerbaijan army dates back to Azerbaijan Democratic Republic (ADR) in 1918, when the Armed Forces of the Republic of Azerbaijan were created on 26 June 1918. First de facto Minister of Defense of ADR was Dr. Khosrov bey Sultanov. When the Ministry was formally established, Gen. Samedbey Mehmandarov became the minister, and Lt-Gen. Ali-Agha Shikhlinski his deputy. Chiefs of Staff of ADR Army were Lt-Gen. Maciej Sulkiewicz (March 1919 – 10 December 1919) and Maj-Gen. Abdulhamid bey Gaitabashi (10 December 1919 – April 1920).

The Red Army invaded Azerbaijan on 28 April 1920. Although the bulk of the newly formed Azerbaijani army was engaged in putting down an Armenian revolt that had just broken out in Karabakh, the Azerbaijanis did not surrender their brief independence of 1918–20 quickly or easily. As many as 20,000 of the total 30,000 soldiers died resisting what was effectively a Russian reconquest. The national Army of Azerbaijan was abolished by the Bolshevik government, 15 of the 21 army generals were executed by the Bolsheviks.

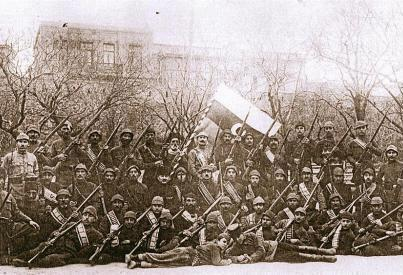
Officers of the army of the Azerbaijan Democratic Republic in 1918

=== Russian Civil War ===
After the Sovietisation of Azerbaijan, the newly formed Azerbaijani Red Army replaced the previous army, taking part in the Russian Civil War, and the invasion of Georgia.

=== World War II ===
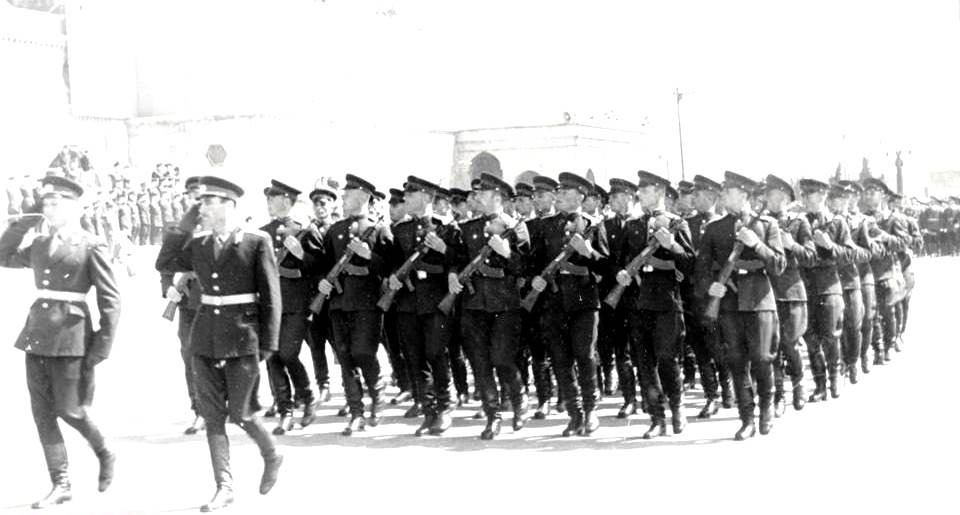
Cadets of the Baku Higher All-Arms Command School during a parade in Baku in 1960

During World War II, Azerbaijan played a crucial role in the strategic energy policy of Soviet Union. Much of the Soviet Union's oil on the Eastern Front was supplied by Baku. By a decree of the Supreme Soviet of the USSR in February 1942, the commitment of more than 500 workers and employees of the oil industry of Azerbaijan was recognised with orders and medals. Operation Edelweiss carried out by the German Wehrmacht targeted Baku because of the importance of its oil fields to the USSR. Some 800,000 Azerbaijanis fought within the ranks of the Soviet Army of which 400,000 died. Azerbaijani national formations of the Red Army included the 223rd, 227th, 396th, 402nd, and 416th Rifle Divisions. Azerbaijani Major-General Hazi Aslanov was awarded a second Hero of the Soviet Union after a long post-war fight for recognition of his accomplishments.

=== Dissolution of the Soviet armed forces ===
During the Cold War, Azerbaijan had been the deployment area of units of the Soviet 4th Army whose principal formations in 1988 included four motor rifle divisions (23rd Guards, 60th, 75th, and 295th). The 75th Motor Rifle Division was isolated in Nakhchivan. The 4th Army also included missile and air defense brigades and artillery and rocket regiments. The 75th Division's stores and equipment were apparently transferred to the Nakhchivan authorities. Azerbaijan also hosted the 49th Arsenal of the Soviet Main Agency of Missiles and Artillery, which contained over 7,000 train-car loads of ammunition to the excess of one billion units.

The first president of Azerbaijan, Ayaz Mutallibov, did not wish to build an independent army, wanting to rely instead largely on Soviet troops. Even when the Parliament decided that an army should be formed in September 1991, disagreements between the government and the opposition Azerbaijani Popular Front Party impeded creation of a unified force. Around this time, the first unit of the new army was formed on the basis of the 18–110 military unit of mechanized infantry of the Soviet Ground Forces (probably part of the 4th Army) located in Shikhov, south of Baku. At the time of the parliamentary decision, Lieutenant-General Valeh Barshadli became the first Minister of Defense of Azerbaijan, from 5 September to 11 December 1991. Later from May to 4 September 1992 he served as Chief of General Staff of Azerbaijani Armed Forces.

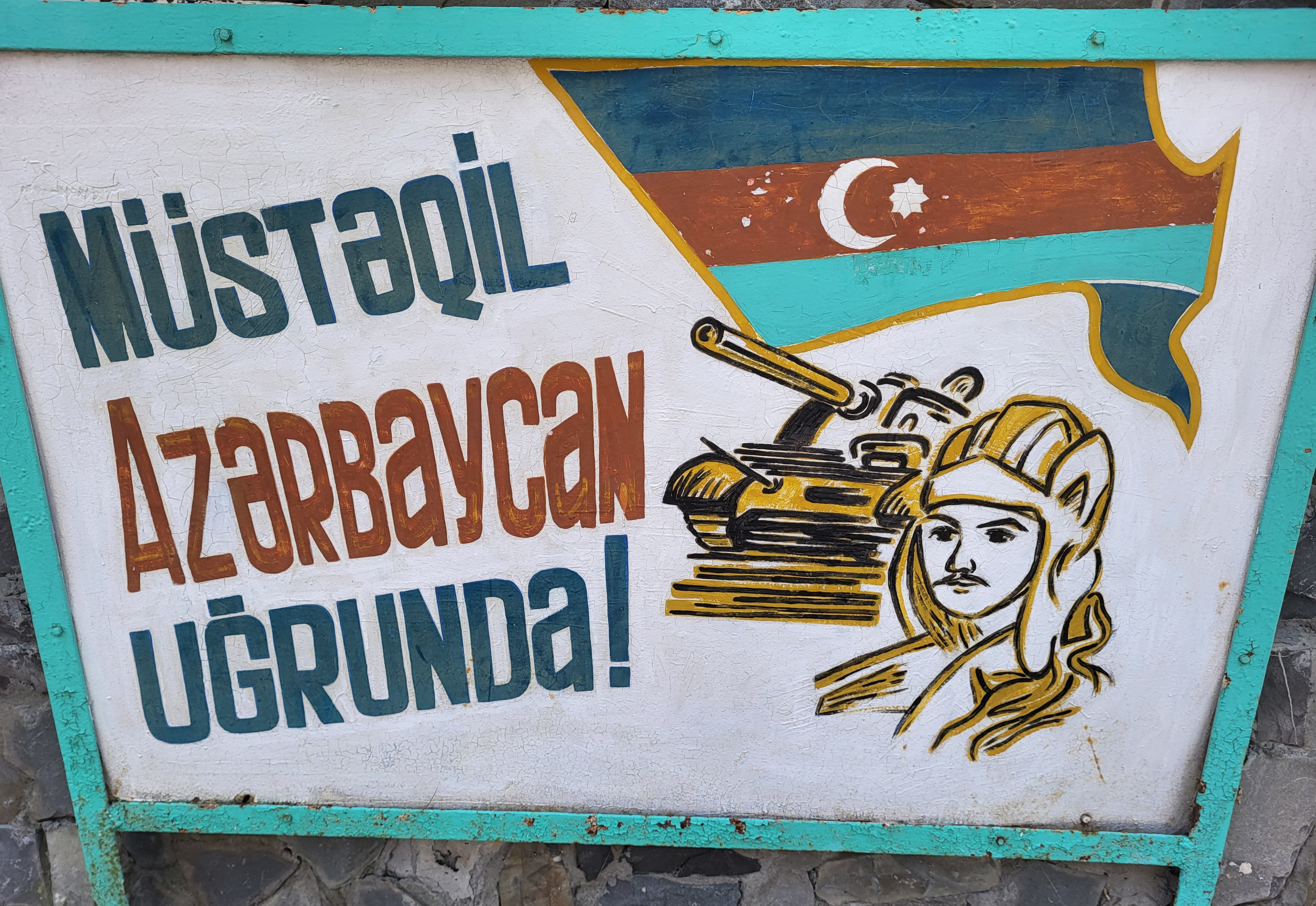
A military plaque in Oghuz saying Müstəqil Azərbaycan Uğrunda, 'For an independent Azerbaijan'

=== Newly formed military ===
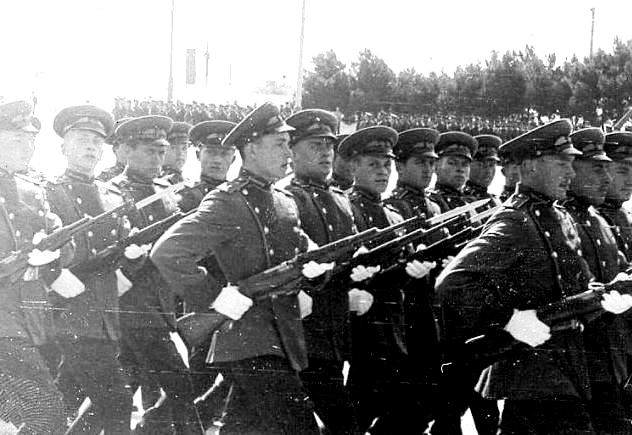
A Guard of Honor during a parade in Baku in 1966

In summer 1992, the nascent Defense Ministry received a resolution by the Azerbaijani president on the takeover of units and formations in Azerbaijani territory. It then forwarded an ultimatum to Moscow demanding control over vehicles and armaments of the 135th and 139th Motor Rifle Regiments of the 295th Motor Rifle Division. In July 1992, Azerbaijan ratified the Treaty on Conventional Armed Forces in Europe (CFE), which establishes comprehensive limits on key categories of conventional military equipment.

The transfer of the property of the 4th Army (except for part of the property of the 366th Motor Rifle Regiment of the 23rd Guards Motor Rifle Division captured by Armenian armed formations in 1992 during the regiment's withdrawal from Stepanakert) and the 49th arsenal was completed in 1992. Thus, by the end of 1992, Azerbaijan received arms and military hardware sufficient for approximately four motor rifle divisions with prescribed army units. It also inherited naval ships. There are also reports that 50 combat aircraft from the disbanded 19th Army of the Soviet Air Defence Forces came under Azerbaijani control.

“Full-fledged work on the creation of a national army in Azerbaijan began only in November 1993, when the ..situation.. began to stabilize.” Articles for draft evasion and desertion were introduced.

The Azerbaijani armed forces took a series of devastating defeats by Armenian forces during the 1992–1994 Nagorno-Karabakh War, which resulted in the loss of control of Nagorno-Karabakh proper and seven surrounding rayons, comprising roughly 20% of the territory of Azerbaijan. Azerbaijani sources insist that Armenian victory was largely due to military help from Russia and the wealthy Armenian diaspora. Armenians partially deny the allegation, claiming that Russian side was equally supplying Armenian and Azerbaijani sides with weapons and mercenaries. During the war, the Azerbaijani armed forces were also aided by Turkish military advisers, and Russian, Ukrainian, Chechen and Afghan mercenaries.

Azerbaijan approved the CFE flank agreement in May 1997.

=== 21st century ===
Despite the rise in Azerbaijan's defence budget, the armed forces were assessed in 2008 as not having a high state of battle readiness and being ill-prepared for wide scale combat operations. Azeri victory in the Second Karabakh War in late 2020 demonstrated how significantly Azerbaijan's military capabilities had grown.

A number of Azerbaijani human rights groups have been tracking non-combat deaths and have noted an upward trend in the early 2010s. Based on Defense Ministry statistics that had not been released to the public, the Group of Monitoring Compliance with Human Rights in the Army (GMCHRA) has recorded the deaths of 76 soldiers to date in non-combat incidents for 2011, and the injury of 91 others. In comparison, there were 62 non-combat deaths and 71 cases of injury in 2010. The string of non-combat deaths raises questions about the reform progress of the military. Factors behind the deaths include bullying, hazing, and the systemic corruption within the Azerbaijani Armed Forces (see Corruption in Azerbaijan).

In 2017, Azerbaijani authorities used large scale torture (the Tartar Case) on Azerbaijani military personnel accused of treason. Generals Nacmeddin Sadikhov and Hikmet Hasanov were accused of torturing Azerbaijani officers and soldiers and according to the authorities and human rights defenders, more than 400 people were subjected to torture in the course of the case. The Azerbaijani authorities claimed one person was killed as a result, while human rights defenders say the number is about 13, and many were wrongfully convicted and given hefty prison sentences.

=== Second Karabakh War ===
The Second Karabakh War (also known in Azerbaijan as "The Patriotic War" or "Operation Iron Fist") began on the morning of 27 September 2020 when Azerbaijan launched an offensive along the Line of Contact. On the seventh day of the war, a major offensive was launched by the ground forces, advancing in the north, making some territorial gains while the fighting gradually shifted to the south. Following the capture of Shusha, the second-largest settlement in Nagorno-Karabakh, by Azerbaijani forces, a ceasefire agreement was signed between Azerbaijan, and Armenia, ending all hostilities in the area. Under the agreement, Armenia returned the surrounding territories it occupied in 1994 to Azerbaijan while Azerbaijan gained land access to its Nakhchivan exclave. Total casualties were in the low thousands.

During the war, the Azerbaijani army was widely accused of committing war crimes against Armenian soldiers and civilians. Human Rights Watch and Amnesty International both condemned Azerbaijan's “indiscriminate” shelling of Armenian civilians, including the use of cluster munitions. In addition, videos of Azerbaijani soldiers mistreating or executing captive Armenians were circulated online and received widespread condemnation.

On 10 December, a victory parade was held in honor of the Azerbaijani Army on Azadliq Square, with 3,000 soldiers marching alongside military equipment, unmanned aerial vehicles and aircraft.

In August 2022, the UN Committee on the Elimination of Racial Discrimination expressed deep concern regarding "severe and grave human rights violations committed during 2020 hostilities and beyond by the Azerbaijani military forces against prisoners of war and other protected persons of Armenian ethnic or national origin, including extrajudicial killings, torture and other ill-treatment and arbitrary detention as well as the destruction of houses, schools, and other civilian facilities."

== Structure ==
=== Command ===
Since the fall of the Soviet Union, there have been attempts in the defence ministry to reform the military to be more in line with the Turkish/NATO model, resulting in Soviet-legacy officers such as Rovshan Akbarov and Najmeddin Sadikov being removed from power.

Azerbaijan periodically holds drills to improve interaction and combat coordination between the servicemen during operations, its military personnel's combat readiness, as well as to develop commanders' military decision-making and unit management skills.

=== Land Forces ===
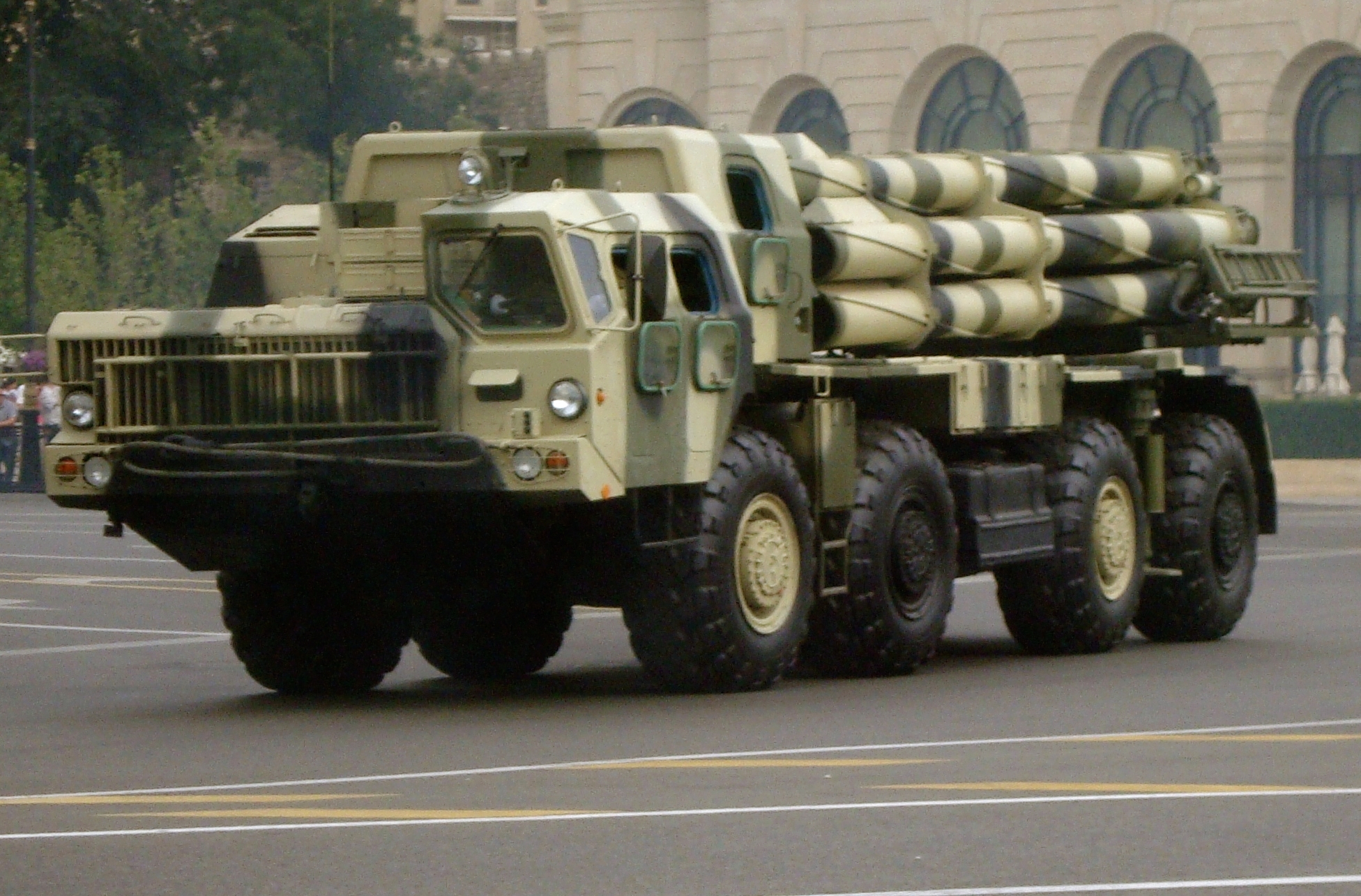
Azerbaijan has a dozen 300mm salvo rocket systems 9A52 "Smerch" with a range of 70–90 km (43.50–55.92 mi).

In 2026, the Azerbaijani Land Forces are about 57,000 strong, according to UK International Institute for Strategic Studies estimates. From 2007 or before, the IISS has also listed about 300,000 former service personnel who have had military service in the last 15 years. Other paramilitary agencies consist of Interior Ministry Internal Troops of Azerbaijan, 12,000 strong, and the land component of the State Border Service, 5,000 strong. In 2007-2010, 2,500 men of the National Guard might have been able to augment the ground forces.

Azerbaijan has signed numerous contracts to strengthen its armed forces and to train its military with Turkey's assistance. Over the last 15 years, Azerbaijan has been preparing its military for possible action against Armenian forces in Nagorno-Karabakh.

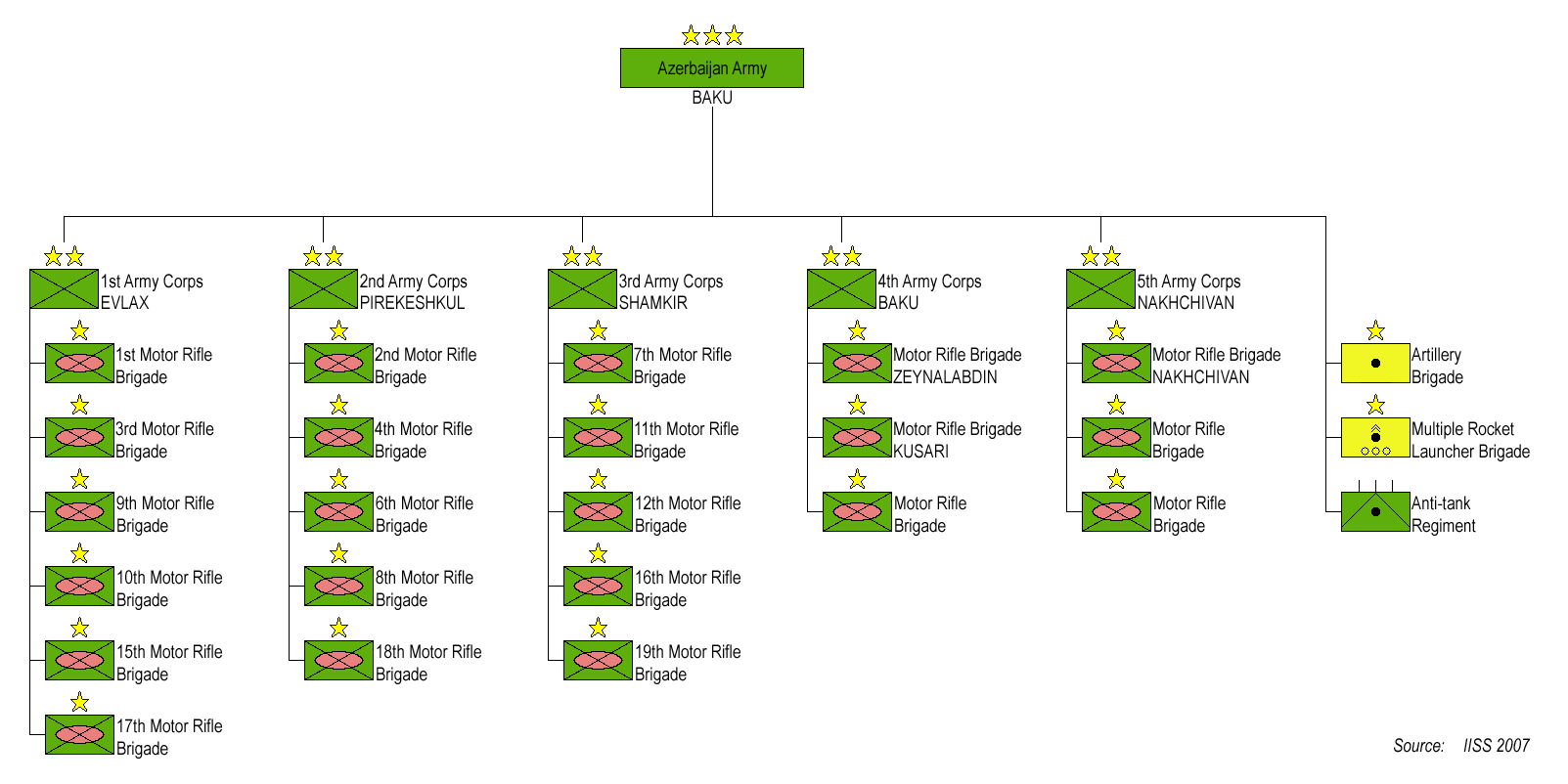
Azerbaijani Army order of battle

The Land Forces consist of five army corps:

- 1st Army Corps also known as Barda Army Corps (concentrated near Ganja)
- 2nd Army Corps also known as Beylagan Army Corps (concentrated against Armenian occupied territories and part is deployed on the Azerbaijan-Iranian border)
- 3rd Army Corps also known as Shamkir Army Corps (concentrated against Armenian occupied territories)
- 4th Army Corps also known as Baku Army Corps (covers Absheron Peninsula and the coast)
- Nakhchivan Separate Combined Arms Army (deployed in Nakhchivan)

The Land Forces include 23 motor rifle brigades, an artillery brigade, a multiple rocket launcher brigade, and an anti-tank regiment. The IISS Military Balance reported in 2007 that the Land Forces had an estimated 40 SA-13 Gopher, SA-4 Ganef, and SA-8 Gecko air defence missile systems, with '80–240 eff.' to support the army in the battlefield.

The peacekeeping forces of Azerbaijan are mostly supplied from the Land Forces, though the Internal Troops of Azerbaijan do also supply some. In March 2011, 94 Azeri soldiers were deployed with the International Security Assistance Force (ISAF) in Afghanistan. In the past, they were also deployed on operations in Kosovo and Iraq.

The Azerbaijani unit deployed in Iraq consisted of 14 officers, 16 sergeants and 120 privates, a total of 150 troops. The unit secured the hydroelectric power station and reservoir in Al Haditha from August 2003. In December 2008, Azerbaijan withdrew the unit from Iraq.

Reportedly in December 2014 Azerbaijan created the Separate Combined Arms Army in Nakhchivan. Karam Mustafayev became commander of the corps. The army was created based on the Nakhchivan 5th Army Corps to strengthen defense capability of Nakhchivan Autonomous Republic, increase of combat capability of military units and formations of the Armed Forces, improve central control, reports quoting the Defence Ministry said.

=== Air forces ===
The Azerbaijani Air and Air Defence Force is a single unified service branch. Some 8,000 men serve in the air force and air defence force. In 2007 the Air and Air Defence Force has around 106 aircraft and 35 helicopters. That year the IISS listed 37 fighter aircraft, 15 fighter-ground attack aircraft, four transport aircraft, 50 training aircraft (including five combat capable trainers), 15 attack helicopters, and 20 transport helicopters. The country has four major airbases. Nasosnaya (air base) has fighters, Kyurdamir Air Base a bomber regiment, Ganja Air Base transports, and Baku Kala Air Base the helicopter unit. There are also four other airbases which do not appear to have aircraft based there. These are Dollyar Air Base, Nakhchivan Airport, Sanqacal Air Base, and Sitalcay Air Base.

The Azerbaijani Air Force used MiG-29s purchased from Ukraine in 2006, Mikoyan-Gurevich MiG-21s, Sukhoi Su-24s and Sukhoi Su-25s, as well as Ilyushin Il-76 transport aircraft. In 2007 the MiG-29 was designated as the standard aircraft for the AzAF. In 2015 Azerbaijan held talks with either the People's Republic of China or Pakistan to purchase JF-17 Thunder aircraft. MiG-25s previously in service have been retired seemingly in the 2007–09 period.

Azerbaijan's helicopter force is concentrated at Baku Kala Air Base and according to the IISS consists of a single regiment with around 14–15 Mi-24, 12–13 Mi-8 and 7 Mi-2. Jane's Information Group and the IISS give figures which agree with only a single aircraft's difference. Recently, end of 2010 Russian Rosvertol announced that Azerbaijan armed forces signed a deal for 24 pieces of Mi-35M (Hind-E) gunships what would further enhance the Azerbaijani ground attack formations.

The Air Force has L-39 advanced training aircraft in store. The Azerbaijan Border Guard and Voluntary Society of Defense, Patriotism and Sport have Yakovlev light training aircraft.

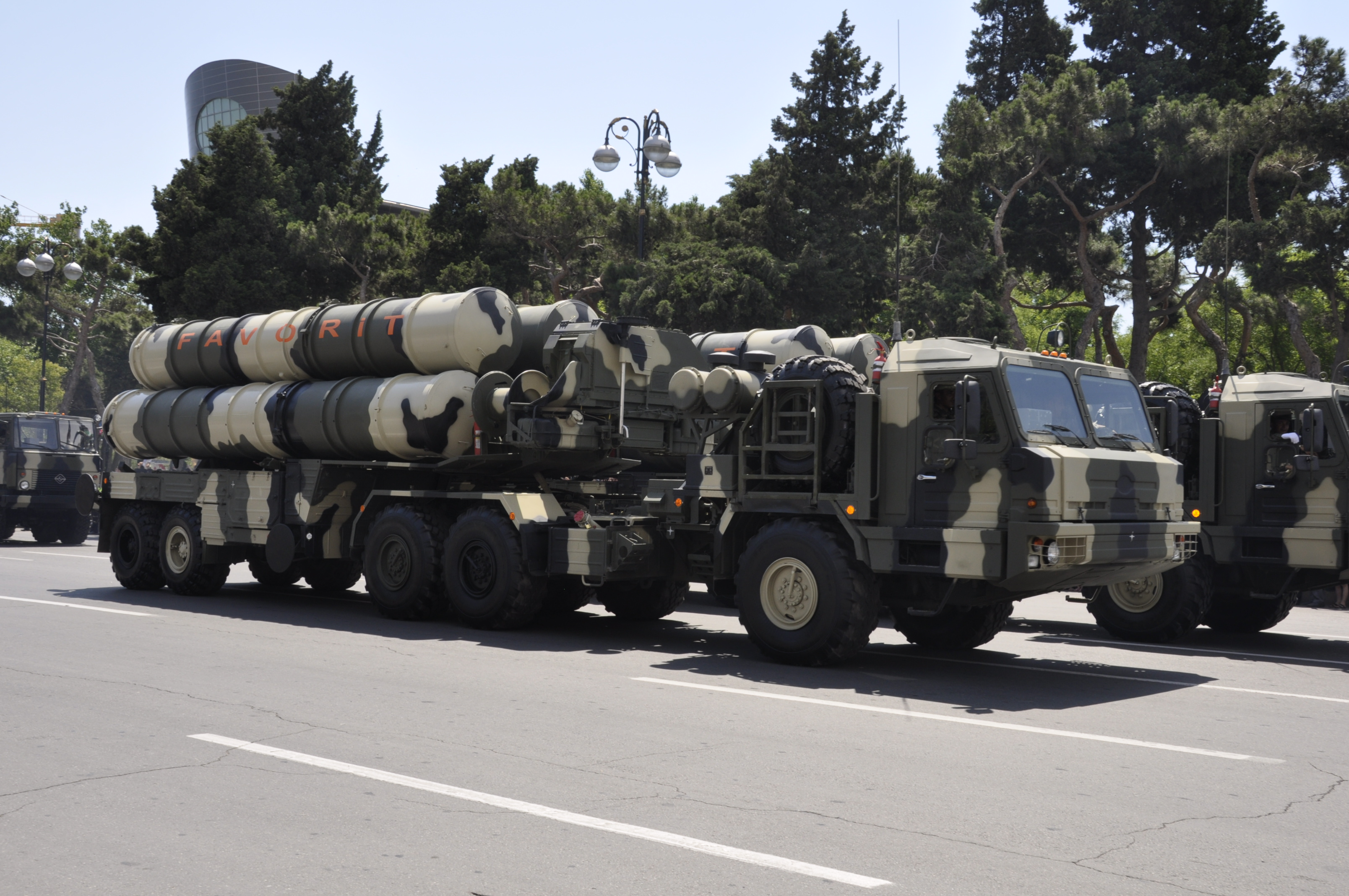
S-300 PMU2 during a military parade in Baku 2011

Azerbaijan has missile and radar systems intended to defend Azerbaijani airspace. There are at least 2 divisions of S-300PMU2. Thereby the country has one of the most capable SAM surface-to-air missile system in the region. Azerbaijan also operates two S-200 (SA-5 GAMMON) batteries near Baku and Mingachevir; the S-300PMU-2 represents a logical replacement for these systems offering coverage of the majority of the nation. The country also has about 100 NATO designated SA-2 Guideline (original name S-75), SA-3 Goa (S-125 Pechora-2M), and the SA-5 Gammon (S-200) are in static installations. These may be around Baku and the central part to cover the whole Azerbaijani aerospace.

However, August 2011 investigations shows that after purchase of S-300 surface-to-air missiles, the largest apparent gap in Azerbaijan's air defense system may have been filled.

Also in Azerbaijan there was a former Soviet early warning radar. The Gabala Radar Station was a bistatic phased-array installation, operated by the Russian Space Forces. The contract was signed in 2002 and was due to expire in 2012 where it was to be given back to the Azerbaijani government. The contract costed Russia $7 million per year. The radar station had a range of up to 6,000 kilometres (3,700 miles), and was designed to detect intercontinental ballistic missile launches as far as from the Indian Ocean. In December 2012 Russia announced that negotiations had been unsuccessful and that they had stopped using the radar station. The site was given back to Azerbaijan and all the equipment dismantled and transported to Russia. Nowadays, Russia covers the area from the Armavir Radar Station.

=== Navy ===
The main naval base of the Soviet Union in the Caspian Sea was based in Baku. When the Soviet Union collapsed, Azerbaijan inherited the naval base and parts of the Caspian Sea Flotilla. The IISS estimated in 2026 that the Azerbaijan Navy had 1,750 personnel. This was down from Jane's Fighting Ships, 2010, which estimated 2,000 personnel. In 2010, the navy had a Petya class light frigate, Qusar (G 121), and a number of patrol craft, including one Turk class, Araz, P 223, one Brya (Project 722) class, P 218, one Shelon (Project 1388M) class, P 212, one Poluchat class (Project 368), P 219, one Luga class (Project 888), T 710, and four Petrushka (Polish UK-3 class), P 213, P 214, P 215, and P 216. There are four minesweepers consisting of 2 Sonya class minesweeper and 2 Yevgenya class minesweepers. (Jane's Fighting Ships 2010)

The Navy is also attributed with 5 landing craft, 3 Polnochny and 2 Vydra (IISS 2007), plus three research ships, 1 Project 10470, A 671, ex Svyaga, 1 Balerian Uryvayev class survey vessel (AG) and one Vadim Popov class survey vessel (AG).

The U.S. Navy has helped train the Azerbaijani Navy. There is also an agreement to provide US support to refurbish Azerbaijani warships in the Caspian Sea. In 2006, the US Government donated 3 motorboats to the Azerbaijani Navy. In 2007, an agreement between the Azerbaijani Navy and a US military company was concluded, which stated that a part of the Azerbaijani Navy would be equipped with advanced laser marksmanship systems. The US company specialists were also to give training on the use of the new equipment. A number of separate U.S. programmes are underway under the Caspian Guard Initiative, focused mostly on enhancing Azerbaijani and Kazakh maritime border security.

In May 2011, the president of the State Oil Company of Azerbaijan Republic Rovnag Abdullayev stated that Azerbaijan would start production of national warships after 2013.

The Naval Intelligence of Azerbaijan maintains the 641st Special Warfare Naval Unit. The special forces were trained by the U.S. Navy SEALs Unit 641 has several midget submarines such as Triton-1M and Triton 2 at their disposal as well as underwater tool motion for individual divers. The special unit is composed of 3 reconnaissance groups, 2 groups for mountainous warfare, and one diving group. Obligatory training includes parachute jumping day and night, on land and on water.

=== Special forces ===
The Special Forces of Azerbaijan are part of the Ministry of Defence. It was established in April 1999 with officers and warrant officers who had participated in the First Nagorno-Karabakh War of 1991–1994. The Turkish Special Forces Command played a role in the formation of the unit. During the 2020 Nagorno-Karabakh War, personnel of the Special Forces reclaimed the city of Jebrayil and nine surrounding villages from the Armenian Army. On November 8, Aliyev congratulated the commander of the Special Forces on their "liberation of Shusha". The war was considered to be first time Azerbaijan has actively used all of its special forces units.

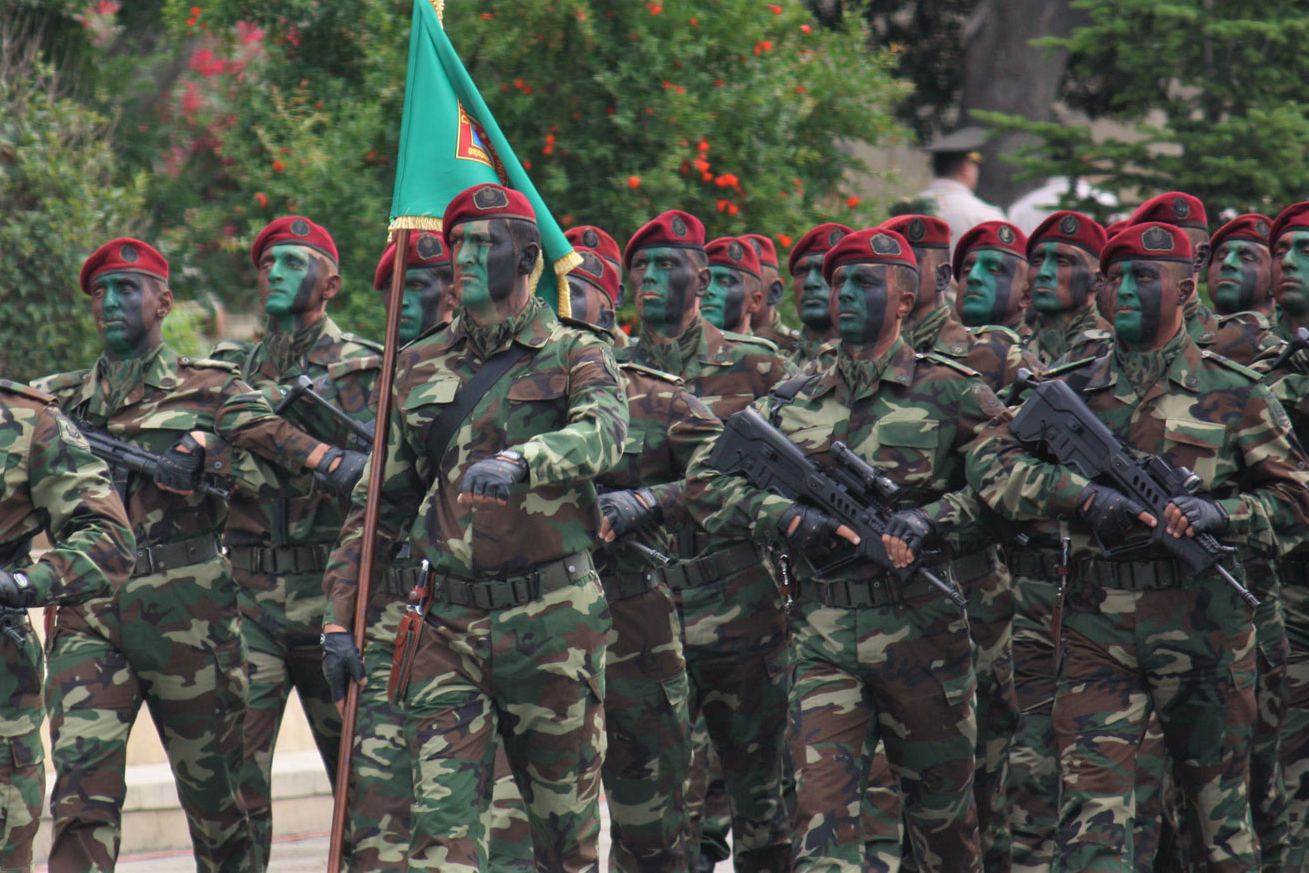
Members of the Azerbaijani Special Forces during a military parade in Baku 2011

== Defense industry ==
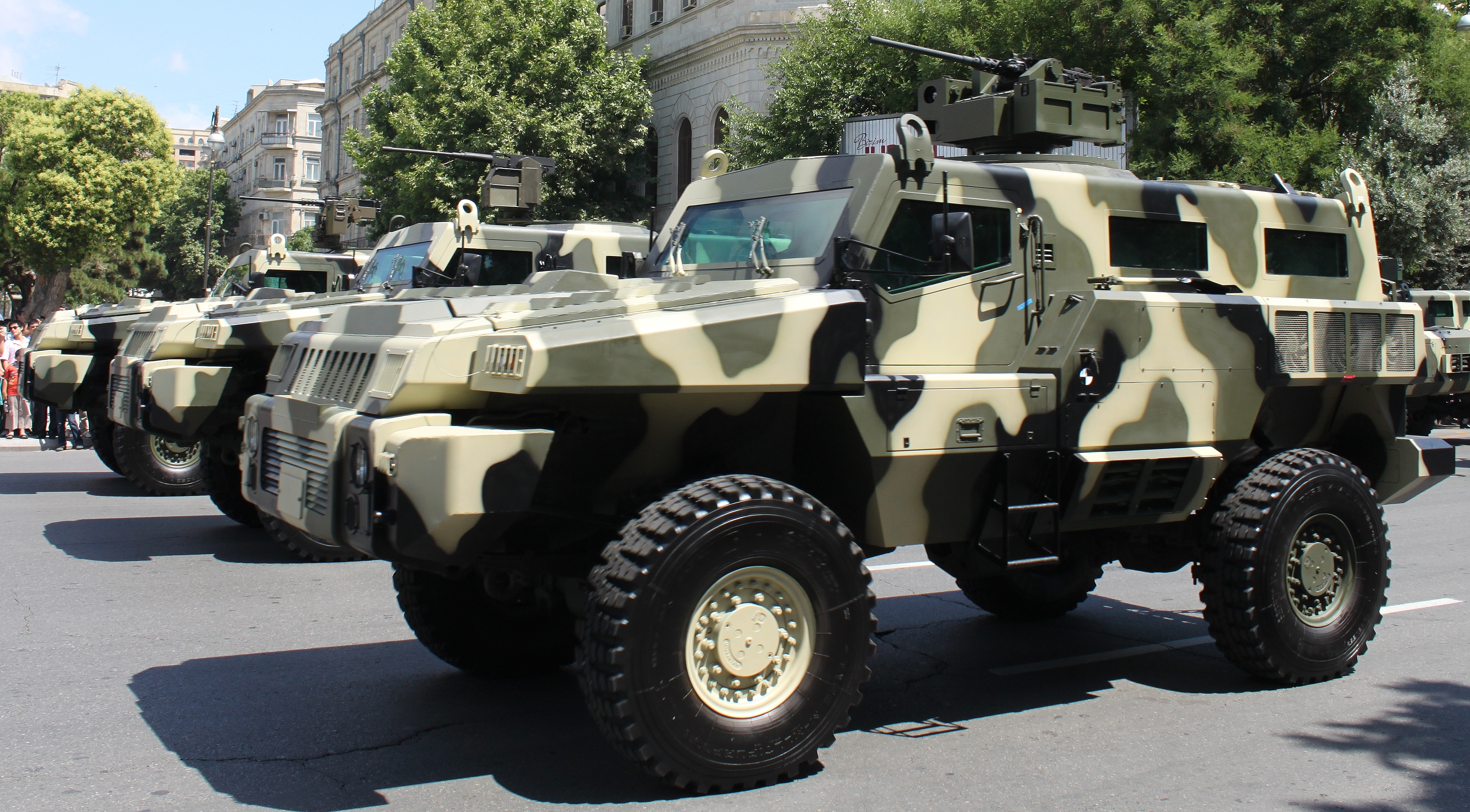
The Marauder is a South African MRAP manufactured under license in Azerbaijan.

The Ministry of Defence Industry of Azerbaijan directs domestic military supplies for Azerbaijan. It was established in 2005. The Defence Industries Ministry subsumed the State Department for Military Industry and for Armaments and the Military Science Center, each of which was formerly a separate agency within the Azerbaijani Defense Ministry.

The defense industry has emerged as an autonomous entity with a growing production capability. The ministry is cooperating with the defense sectors of Ukraine, Belarus and Pakistan. Along with other contracts, Azerbaijani defence industries and Turkish companies, Azerbaijan will produce 40mm revolver grenade launchers, 107mm and 122mm MLRS systems, Cobra 4×4 vehicles and joint modernization of BTR vehicles in Baku.

The major military companies of Azerbaijan are:

- RPE Iglim, aviation and shipbuilding
- Radiogurashdirma, communication means and radio-electronic
- RPE Neftgazavtomat, devices and automation systems for monitoring technological processes
- RPE Automatic Lines, non-standard equipment and products for application in electrotechnical and machine engineering
- Avia-Agregat, multi-purpose aviation equipment, various airdrome conditioners, universal container of board conductor, air-to-air radiators, fuel-oil, air-to-air heat exchangers and ventilators

In early 2008, reports indicated that an agreement with Turkey had been signed which would lead to Azerbaijan producing armoured personnel carriers, infantry fighting vehicles, and small calibre artillery pieces.

== International cooperation ==
Since the Dissolution of the Soviet Union Azerbaijan didn't join the Russian dominated CSTO nor the western NATO. But Azerbaijan participates in NATO's Partnership for Peace.

The country is a member of regional alliances: since 2013, Azerbaijan has been a member of the Eurasia Special Forces with Military Status, or TAKM, alongside Turkey, Kyrgyzstan, and Mongolia. Azerbaijan is also a member of the GUAM alliance. Azerbaijan has military exchange and support by Ukraine, Pakistan and the US and a very strong exchange and training relationship with the Turkish Armed Forces.

Azerbaijan has acceded to the Nuclear Non-Proliferation Treaty as a non-nuclear weapons state.

In 2003 Azerbaijan joined the multi-national force - Iraq and sent 150 troops to Iraq, and later troops to Kosovo. Azerbaijani troops have also served in Afghanistan with ISAF in a small platoon. For this foreign deployments the Baku "N" Military Unit" of the Land Forces was sent. Azerbaijani military personnel have also served as observers in United Nations peacekeeping operations, including the United Nations Mission in South Sudan (UNMISS).

Azerbaijan cooperates with about 60 countries in the military-technical sphere and has an agreement on military-technical cooperation with more than 30 countries.

=== Turkey ===
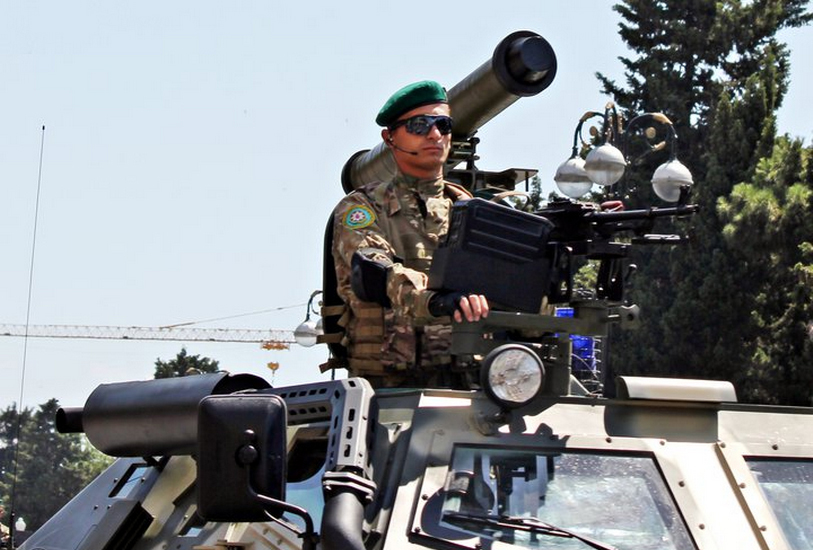
Azerbaijani Special Forces unit in Turkish manufactured Otokar Cobra

In December 2009, an agreement on military assistance was signed by Turkey and Azerbaijan. The agreement envisions Ankara supplying Azerbaijan with weapons, military equipment, and, if necessary, soldiers in case war with Armenia over Karabakh resumes.

Turkey has provided Azerbaijan with infantry weapons, tactical vehicles (jeeps, trucks, etc.) professional training, military organization, technology transfer, licensed military hardware production, and other services. Due to help from Turkish specialists and instructors, thousands of Azerbaijani officers have been trained to western standards.

The military position as an area of international importance of Azerbaijan increased with an agreement between Azerbaijan and Turkey on the participation of an Azerbaijani peacekeeping platoon in the staff of the Turkish battalion in Kosovo.

Since 1992, Azerbaijan and Turkey have signed more than 100 military protocols, some of the major protocols include:

- Cooperation of staff members
- National security cooperation in the topographical area
- Forming and training of professional school of forces in Baku
- Carrying out of the material and technical purchasing
- Military industry cooperation
- Development of the 5th Army Corps also known as Nakhchivan Army Corps in Nakhchivan
- Cooperation in the area of military history, military archives and museum work and military publication
- Assistance on training, material and technical between the Azerbaijan Border Guard and the Turkish Armed Forces.
- Long-term economical and military cooperation and application of the financial aid
- Application of material and technical provision

In May 2011, Azerbaijan had discussed the purchase of long-range rockets from two Chinese companies, the minister of the defence industry has said. Other arms deals were signed with Turkey. Turkish Defence Minister Vecdi Gonul and Yaver Jamalov signed a protocol of intent on future joint production of two types of output – 107-mm rockets and the national rifle, possibly the Mehmetçik-1. A protocol of intent was signed the same day with the Mechanical and Chemical Industry Corporation MKEK on the joint production of 120-mm mortar launchers. This project will come into force in a few months time. Agreement has also been reached with Turkish company Aselsan on the production of some types of defence output in Azerbaijan, specifically the latest types of weapons' sights. These projects will probably happen in the near future too. Recently, Turkish defense industries secretariat told that an export version of the T-155 Firtina self-propelled howitzer is almost done and could start production. T-155 has been powered by a German MTU power pack, which restricts the sale to some countries like Azerbaijan. The Turkish manufacturer MKEK, has announced that they have found an alternate supplier for the power pack where Azerbaijan showed interest to buy the high tech, more capable 155mm 52 caliber from Turkish authorities.

In July and August 2020, the Azerbaijani and Turkish Armed Forces held two-week live-fire joint tactical and flight-tactical exercises across multiple regions in Azerbaijan, including Baku, Nakhchivan, Ganja, Kurdamir, and Yevlakh. Conducted under the framework of their bilateral Military Cooperation Agreement, the maneuvers involved land and air forces utilizing armored vehicles, artillery, military aviation, and air defense systems. The drills followed heightened border skirmishes in the Tovuz region, reflecting ongoing defense integration and procurement initiatives between the two nations.

=== United States ===
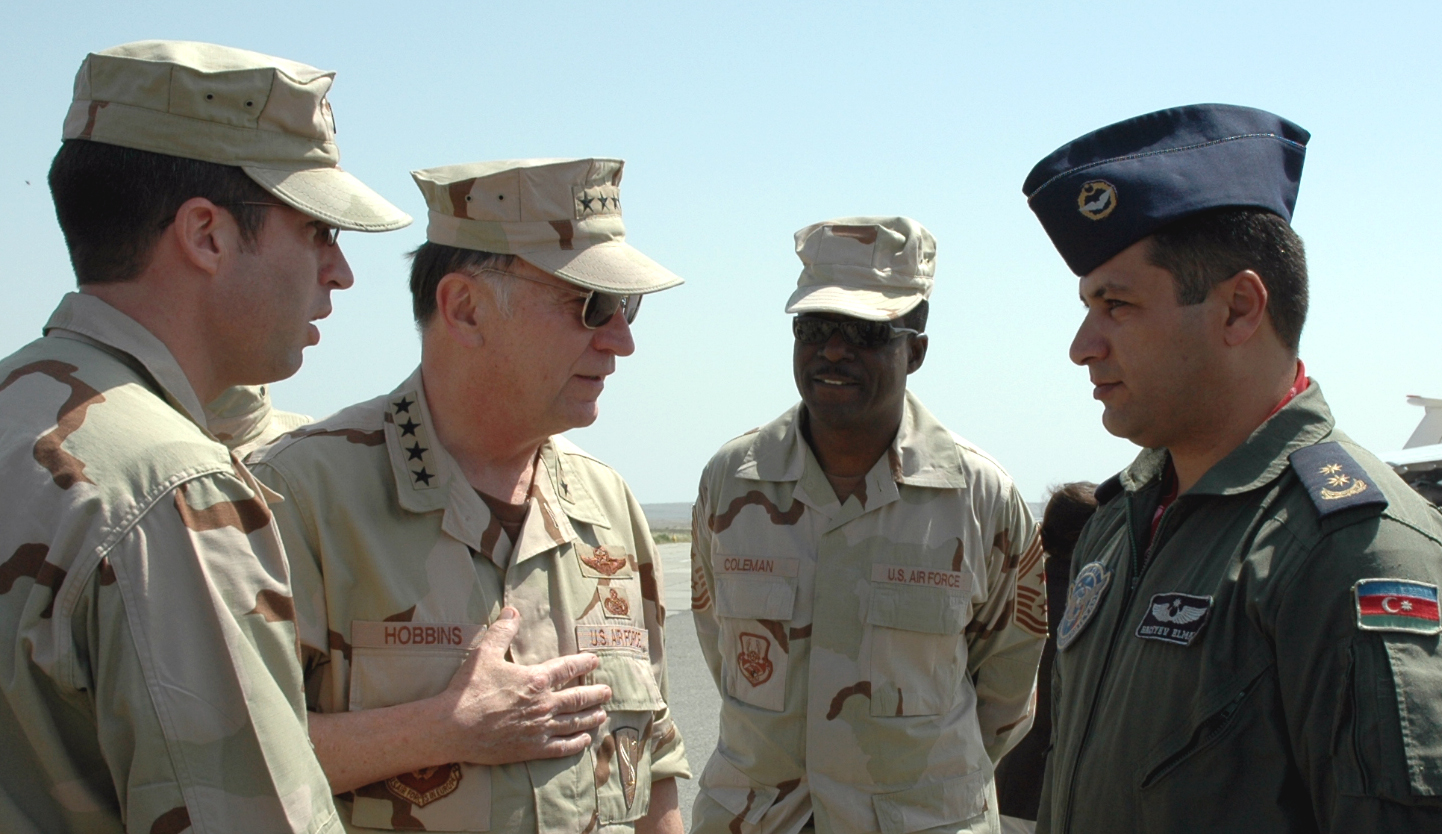
Nasosnaya Air Base in Azerbaijan. Gen. Tom Hobbins, U.S. Air Forces in Europe commander, and Chief Master Sgt. Gary Coleman, USAFE command chief, Lt. Col. Elmar Hüseynov.

Section 907 of the United States Freedom Support Act bans any kind of direct United States aid to the Azerbaijani government. Since a waiver was made in 2001 there has been extensive U.S. military cooperation with Azerbaijan. This has included Special Forces and naval aid, consultations with United States European Command, and linkages through the U.S. National Guard State Partnership Program.

On 19 May 2006, Azerbaijani Defense Minister Safar Abiyev and the then commander of United States Air Forces in Europe General Tom Hobbins met in Baku to discuss military cooperation. He said the objective of his visit was to become familiar with the state of Azerbaijani armed forces. Hobbins pointed to the progress made in the NATO-Azerbaijan relations, saying that the successful implementation of the NATO Partnership for Peace program in Azerbaijan has brought the country even closer to the alliance. He said that the two countries' air forces will expand cooperation.

The U.S. state of Oklahoma is linked with Azerbaijan through the U.S. National Guard State Partnership Program (SPP). Oklahoma National Guard troops have been sent on training and humanitarian missions to Baku.

=== Russia ===
Russia is one of Azerbaijan's main suppliers of arms. "As of today, military and technical cooperation with Russia is measured at $4 billion and it tends to grow further," President Ilham Aliyev said after meeting with Russian President Vladimir Putin in Baku in 2013.

=== Israel ===
Azerbaijan and Israel cooperate on numerous areas of the defense industry. Israel was Azerbaijan's largest weapon supplier with $4.85 billion in sales during 2016 alone. As of 2023, Turkey was Azerbaijan's largest weapon supplier. Azerbaijan has shown great interest in Israeli technology over the years. In particular, an agreement was reached over the construction of the factory of intelligence and combat drones in Azerbaijan.

The Israeli defense company Elta Systems Ltd has had cooperation from Azerbaijan in building the TecSAR reconnaissance satellite system, which can take high-definition photos of ground surfaces in all weather conditions. According to Azerbaijani military experts, the TecSAR system will be indispensable for military operations in the mountainous terrains of Azerbaijan.

As of June 2009, Israel and Azerbaijan had been negotiating on the production of Namer armoured infantry fighting vehicles in Azerbaijan. There is no further information as to whether any agreement has been made.

=== Kyrgyzstan ===
In November 2026, a delegation from the Ministry of Defense of Kyrgyzstan, led by First Deputy Minister Talaybek Sharsheev, conducted an official visit to Azerbaijan to discuss expanding bilateral defense ties. Meetings with Azerbaijani Defense Minister Zakir Hasanov focused on joint military exercises, training programs, and operational experience exchanges. The delegation also evaluated military education infrastructure, visiting the Jamshid Nakhchivanski Military Lyceum, the National Defense University, and the Heydar Aliyev Military Institute to review training programs and conditions for Kyrgyz servicemen studying in Azerbaijan.

=== United Arab Emirates ===
In 2026, the Air Forces of Azerbaijan and the United Arab Emirates conducted "Falcons Meet-2026," a joint tactical flight exercise hosted at an Azerbaijan Air Force aviation base. The exercise involved joint maneuvers between military aircraft and air defense units from both nations, focusing on tactical flight coordination and task integration.

=== Uzbekistan ===
Azerbaijan and Uzbekistan have expanded bilateral cooperation in the military, defense technology, and military education sectors. In October 2026, the armed forces of Azerbaijan, Uzbekistan, and Turkey conducted their first joint trilateral military exercise, titled "Power of Unity-2026." Involving more than 3,500 personnel, the drills took place across Baku, the Karabakh region , Nakhchivan, and the Azerbaijani sector of the Caspian Sea. The exercises focused on modern warfare scenarios, including counter-drone operations, cyberattacks, electronic warfare, counterterrorism in mountainous terrain, and maritime security. Uzbek Defense Minister Lieutenant General Shukhrat Kholmukhamedov attended the drills alongside his Azerbaijani and Turkish counterparts, noting the participating forces' combat readiness and joint operational capabilities.

=== NATO ===
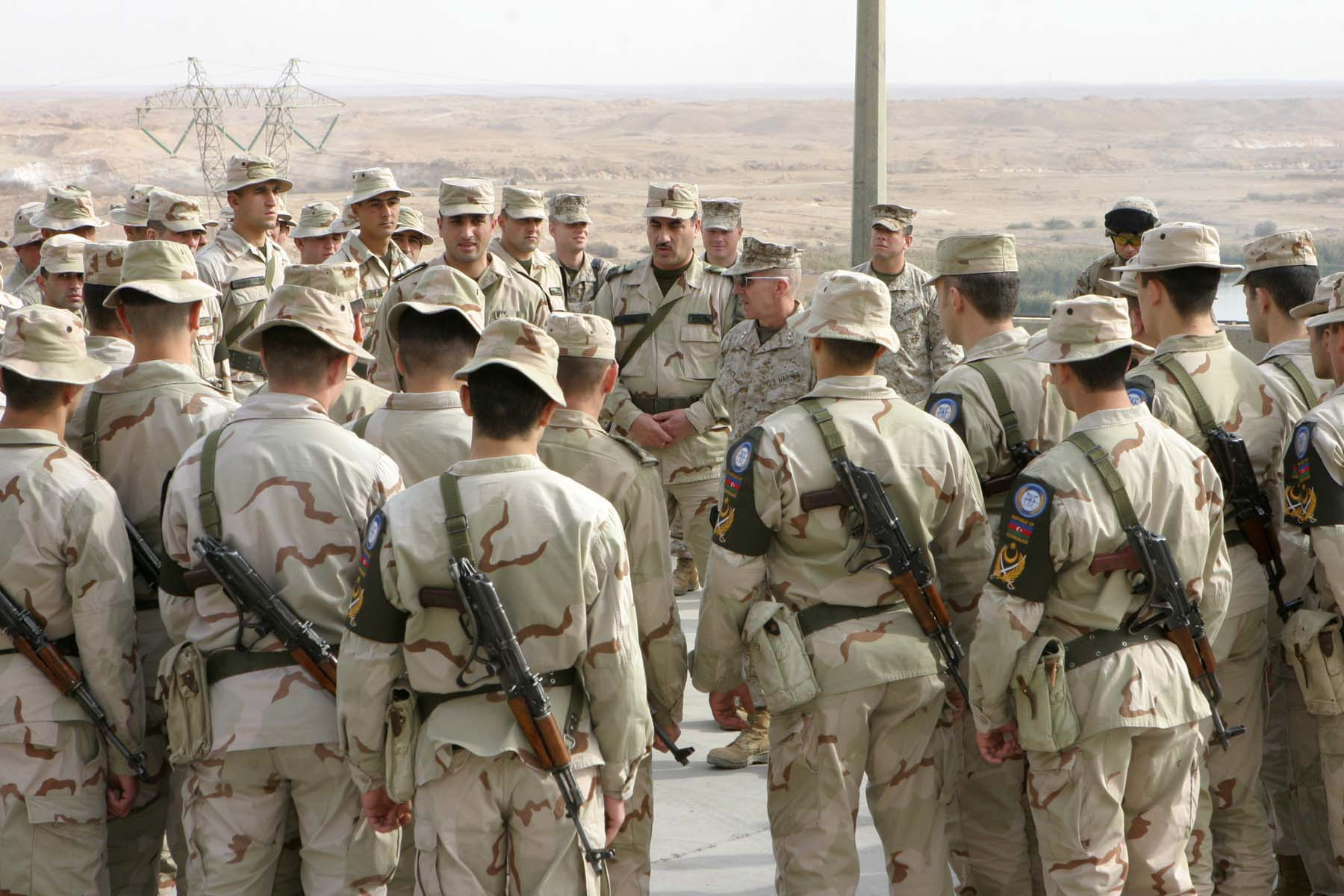
Azerbaijan deployed 150 peacekeepers during the Iraq War.

The North Atlantic Treaty Organization (NATO) and Azerbaijan cooperate. Azerbaijan's Individual Partnership Action Plan (IPAP) and its Partnership for Peace (PfP) linkages lay out the programme of cooperation between Azerbaijan and NATO.

The Azerbaijani government has however delayed implementing IPAP-recommended reforms, however, in part at least because no decision had been taken to seek NATO membership. This is because Azerbaijan's foreign policy 'seeks to balance interests with the U.S., EU, Russia and Iran.'

According to a NATO diplomatic source some key officials at NATO headquarters in Brussels were pushing hard for engaging Azerbaijan on the membership question. "Turkey, Romania, Italy, Poland, the United Kingdom and the Baltic states," are among the member-states also backing a fast track for Azerbaijan's NATO membership.

However, Azerbaijan made its policy of not being aligned with a geopolitical/military structure official when it became a full member of the Non-Aligned Movement in 2011.

There is also a limited amount of military cooperation with the other countries of GUAM: Georgia, Ukraine, Azerbaijan, and Moldova.

=== Hashemite Kingdom of Jordan ===
In July 2026, Special Forces servicemen of the Azerbaijan Army participated in "Zulfiqar", a joint counter-terrorism military exercise held in Jordan. The drills were conducted alongside personnel from the King Abdullah II Royal Special Forces Command of the Jordan Armed Forces, as well as special forces units from Pakistan and Turkey. The exercise incorporated unmanned aerial vehicles and live-fire maneuvers focusing on urban assault, hostage rescue, and tactical coordination among the participating forces.

== Personnel ==
=== Educational system ===
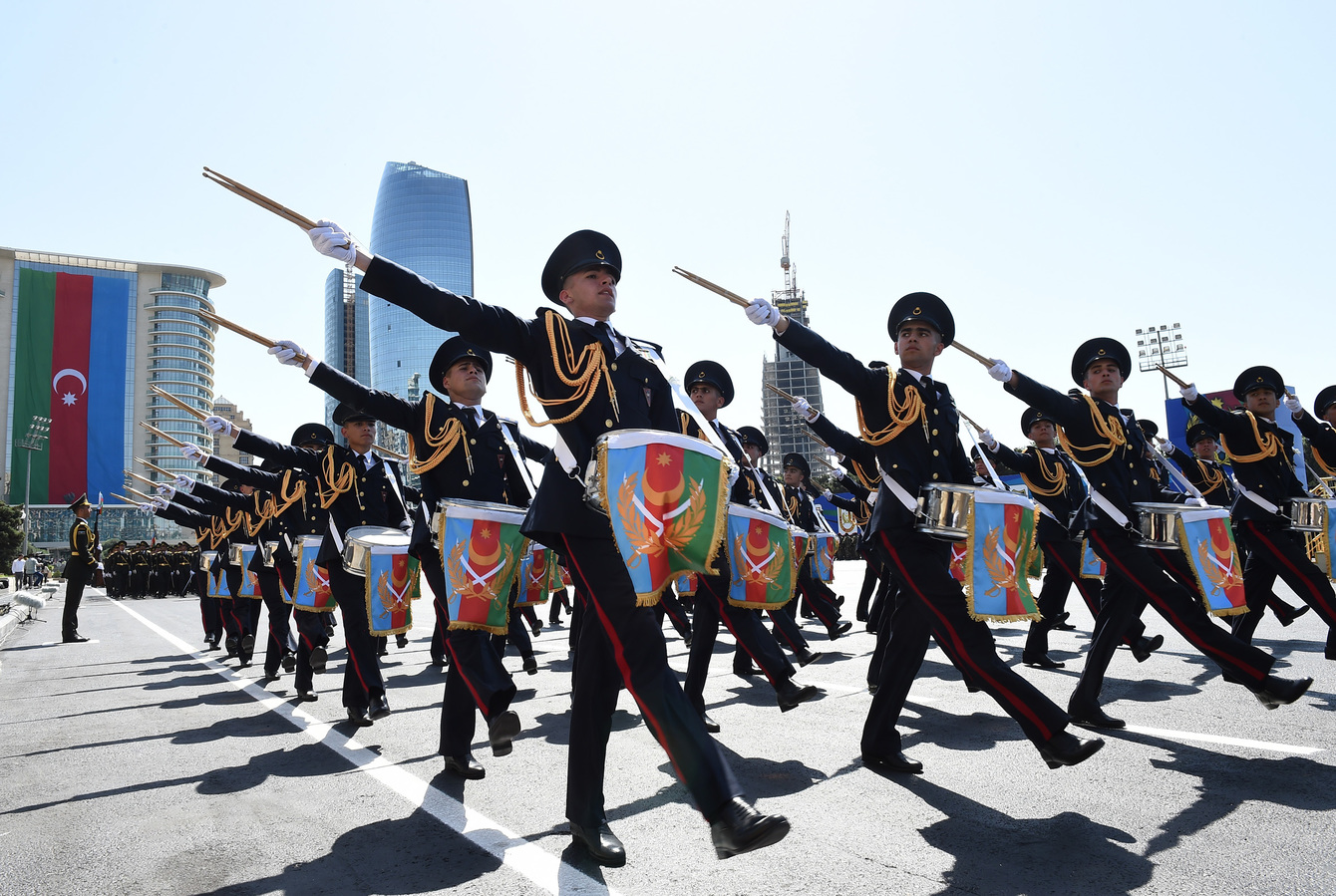
The Cadets of the Corps of Drums of the Jamshid Nakhchivanski Military Lyceum

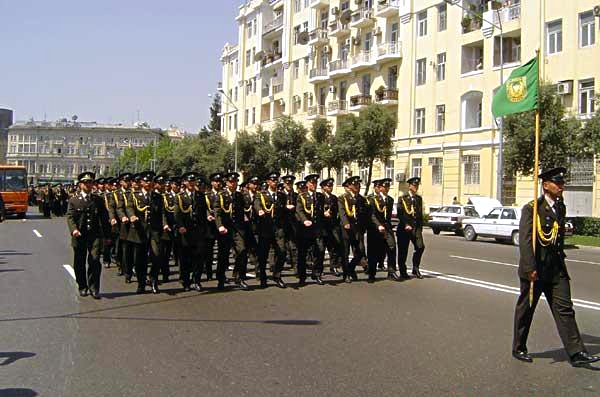
Azerbaijani higher military cadets

The purpose of Azerbaijani military education and training is to train soldiers, officers, and non-commissioned officers to have independent and creative thinking and commitment to the Azerbaijani people and the government. Military education in the Azerbaijani Armed Forces have been described as either being secondary education, further education, or higher education.

Azerbaijani pilots were formerly trained in the Azerbaijan Air Force School, where they would then develop their skills in operational units. Azerbaijan has an experience exchange with Turkey, Ukraine, the United States and a number of NATO countries. The Turkish Air Force School has a great role in the training of Azerbaijani military pilots. Azerbaijani pilots are also trained in Ukraine's Pilot Training School.

The following is a list of educational institutions in the armed forces, under the auspices of the National Defense University:

- Military academies
  - War College of the Armed Forces
  - Training and Education Center of the Armed Forces
  - Azerbaijan Higher Military Academy
    - Azerbaijan Higher Naval Academy (former independent institution)
    - Azerbaijan High Military Aviation School (former independent institution)
- Other educational institutions
  - Secondary Military Medical School of Azerbaijan
  - Military Medical Faculty of Azerbaijan Medical University
- Military lyceums
  - Jamshid Nakhchivanski Military Lyceum
  - Heydar Aliyev Military Lyceum

=== Military Justice ===
Military Courts act as courts of first instance deals. The Military Court is composed of a President and judges. The following military courts exist in Azerbaijan:

- Military Court of Nakhchivan Autonomous Republic
- Baku Military Court (formed in August 1992)
- Ganja Military Court
- Lankaran Military Court
- Fuzuli-Gubadli Military Court
- Tartar Military Court
- Agdam Military Court
- Gazakh Military Court
- Sumgait Military Court

=== Women and ethnic minorities in the armed forces ===
During the first war, Russians, who were a large minority in Azerbaijan at the time, served in the units of the Azerbaijani Army, many of whom formerly served in the Soviet Army. According to the Russian Ministry of Defence more than 300 officers of the 7th Army, based in the capital of Baku, refused to leave Azerbaijan at the outset of the war. During the Second Karabakh War, the death of an ethnic Russian Azerbaijani soldier, Dmitry Solntsev, was reported. There was also Denis Aliyev (born as Denis Pronin) from the Xətai raion, who was killed in Jabrayil. He was later posthumously awarded the Medal "For the Liberation of Jabrayil" in December. Cossacks, associated with the Association of Cossacks of Azerbaijan, often join the Azerbaijani Armed Forces.

Female military personnel in the military are generally involved in education, office work, medical care, and the development of international cooperation. They also serve in the rear, signal troops, and intelligence forces. Women are exempt from conscription, which means that female service is purely on a voluntary basis. There are currently 1,000 female personnel in the Azerbaijani military, accounting for 3% of the armed forces. During the Karabakh Conflict, 2,000 of the 74,000 Azerbaijani soldiers were women, and 600 of them directly took part in military operations, with a women's battalion being established in 1992. The enrollment of females in Azerbaijani higher military schools began in 1999. According to soldier Tehrana Bahruzi in her book, “Zakir Hasanov: the Ideal Minister", Defence Minister Zakir Hasanov was responsible for launching the first female unit in the Special Forces of Azerbaijan. In October 2020, the first female military casualty was reported, a combat medic who died while taking wounded soldiers from the battlefield.

=== Personnel medals and awards ===
- Medal "For Bravery"
- Medal "For Fatherland"
- Medal "For Faultless Service"
- Medal "For blameless service"
- Medal "For distinction in military service"
- Medal "For distinction in the border"
- Medal "For merit in military collaboration"
- Medal "For military merit"
- Veteran of the Armed Forces Medal
- Brave Warrior Medal
- For Distinction in Battle Medal
- For Heroism Medal
- For military services medal
- Anniversary medals
  - "10th Anniversary of the Armed Forces of Azerbaijan (1991–2001)" Medal
  - "90th Anniversary of the Armed Forces of Azerbaijan (1918–2008)" Medal
  - "95th Anniversary of the Armed Forces of Azerbaijan (1918–2013)" Medal
  - Azerbaijani Army 100th anniversary medal
- Battle/war awards
  - Hero of the Patriotic War
  - Hero of the Patriotic War Medal
  - Participant of the Patriotic War Medal
  - For Services in the Rear in the Patriotic War Medal
  - For the Liberation of Aghdam Medal
  - For the Liberation of Fuzuli Medal
  - For the Liberation of Gubadly Medal
  - For the Liberation of Jabrayil Medal
  - For the Liberation of Kalbajar Medal
  - For the Liberation of Khojavend Medal
  - For the Liberation of Lachin Medal
  - For the Liberation of Shusha Medal
  - For the Liberation of Sugovushan Medal
  - For the Liberation of Zangilan Medal

Today 'National Hero of Azerbaijan' is the highest national title in the country, awarded for outstanding services of national importance to Azerbaijan in defense, as well as other deeds in other spheres.

== Traditions and military institutions ==
=== Military oath ===
The military oath (Azerbaijani: Hərbi and) is taken by conscripts as a legal basis of the beginning of their military service. The oath is administered by the commanding officer of the unit. The following is the text for the current version of the oath:

I am a citizen of the Republic of Azerbaijan, and I swear that I will be loyal to my homeland, Azerbaijan and its people, when I join the Azerbaijani Armed Forces.

I solemnly swear:

I will honorably protect the interests of the Republic of Azerbaijan, its sovereignty, territorial integrity and independence, for which I will spare no blood and soul. I will be sincere, brave, disciplined, will not give military secrets, will fulfill the requirements of military regulations, and will unconditionally obey the orders of commanders and chiefs.

I will study the military work in good faith, continue and develop the military traditions of my ancestors with honor, and I will be ready to stand up for the Motherland at any moment with a weapon in hand.

If I break my oath, I am ready to take responsibility with the full seriousness of the laws of the Republic of Azerbaijan.

=== Battle flags and pennants ===
A battle flag for a military unit is a symbol of honor which remains forever in the unit unless it is dissolved. By military law, if the battle flag is lost in battle, the commander of the military unit and the servicemen under its command are brought to court, and the unit is abolished. Battle flags have the color of the State Flag, with the slogan "For Azerbaijan" being embroidered with golden silk on a blue stripe along the upper edge of the fabric. Outside the battle flag, the Azerbaijani military also utilizes the Turkish military tradition of pennants as symbols.

=== Military holidays ===
These are the military holidays observed by all service personnel of the Armed Forces:

- 14 February – Air Force Day
- 9 May – Victory Day (Great Patriotic War)
- 26 June – Day of the Armed Forces
- 5 August – Day of the Azerbaijani Navy
- 27 September – Memorial Day
- 18 October – Day of the First Military Unit
- 8 November – Victory Day

=== Azerbaijan Military History Museum ===
Azerbaijan Military History Museum is a structure under the Ministry of Defense. It was established on 10 December 1992 by the order of the Minister of Defense and in accordance with a decree signed on 29 October 1992 "On the transfer of the Museum of Combat Glory of the VI Army Garrison of the Commonwealth of Independent States". Today, the museum displays 5 tanks, 9 armored personnel carriers, 16 artillery pieces, 6 aircraft, 4 helicopters, 6 different military equipment of the Air Force. Currently, the number of exhibits totals 11,000.

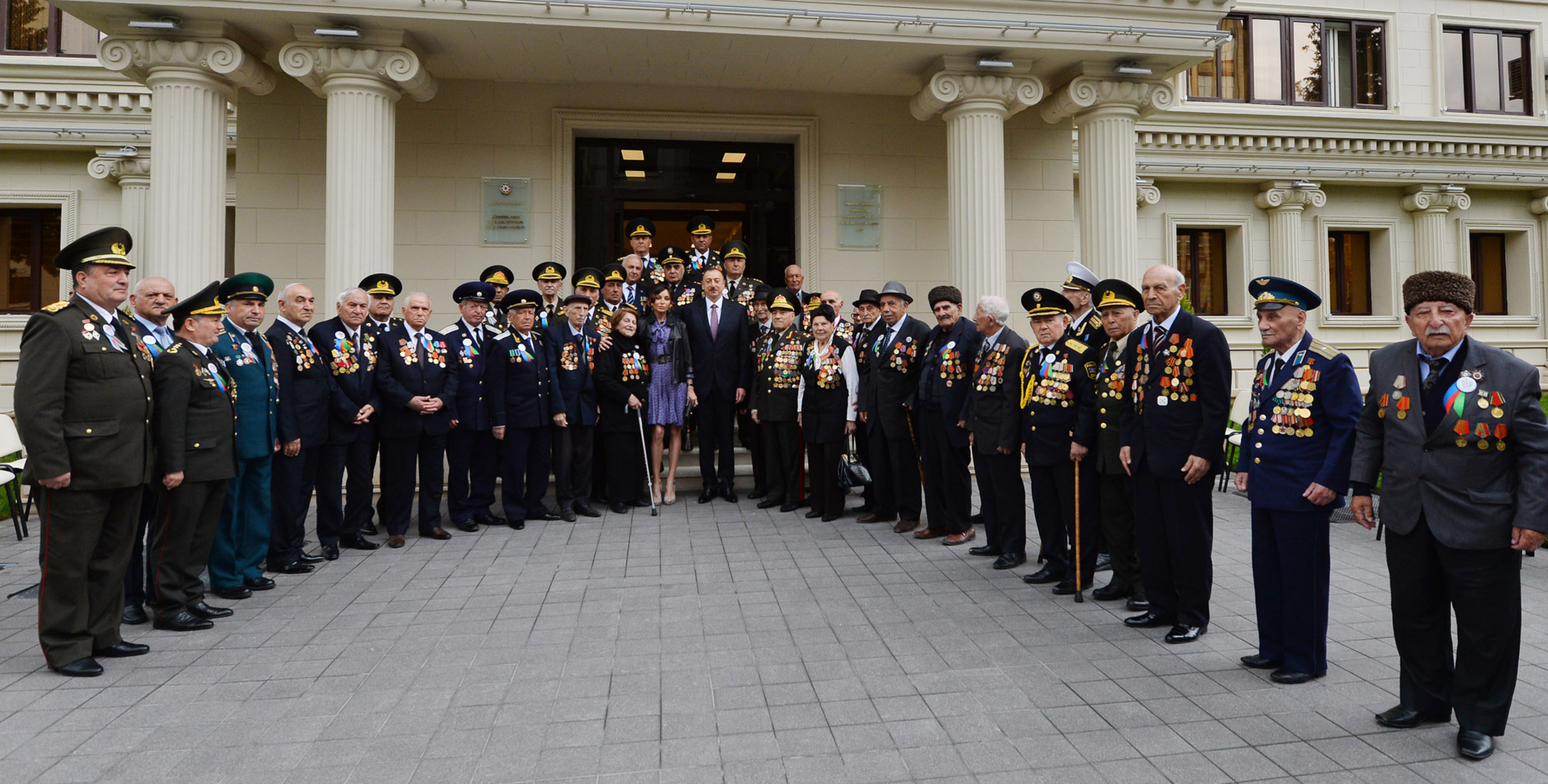
President Ilham Aliyev at the new building of the Organization of Veterans of War, Labor and Armed Forces

=== Republican Veterans Organization ===
After the Second World War, veterans movements were launched in Azerbaijan, with the Baku Veterans Committee being established on 10 June 1960. The activity of the committee was limited to Baku until the early 1970s. During the leadership of First Secretary Heydar Aliyev, there was a revival in the veteran movement, during which the committee gradually expanded to the republic. The establishment of the Republican Veterans Organization took place on 21 March 1987. Despite the official registration of the RVO with the Ministry of Justice, the activity of the organization was largely formal due to the tensions in the country with the Karabakh War, as well as the attitude of the government towards Red Army veterans in general. One of the first laws signed by the President Aliyev was the Law "On Veterans" (28 June 1994), which restored the mandate for the RVO.

== See also ==
- Judiciary of Azerbaijan
- Special Purpose Police Unit
