= Nail Ibrahimli =

Azerbaijani military officer (1994–2020)

- Born: 4 March 1994
- Died: 8 November 2020 (aged 26); Shusha, Azerbaijan
- Military career
- Special Forces: Azerbaijani Army
- Service years: 2012—2013 / 2019—2020
- Unit: Azerbaijani Armed Forces
- Conflicts: Second Karabakh War Battles of Murovdag; Battles of Fuzuli; Battle of Hadrut; Battles of Zangila; Battles of Jabrayil; Battles of Gubadli; Battles of Lachin Battle of Shusha (2020)
- Awards: Hero of the Patriotic War Medal; For the Fatherland Medal; For the Liberation of Shusha Medal; For the Liberation of Khojavend Medal; For the Liberation of Fuzuli Medal

Nail Nəriman oğlu İbrahimli (Azerbaijani: Nail Nəriman oğlu İbrahimli; 4 March 1994, Khachmaz – 8 November 2020, Shusha) was a sergeant major in the Azerbaijani State Border Service of the Azerbaijani Armed Forces. He was killed during the Second Nagorno-Karabakh War in 2020. He was posthumously awarded the title of Hero of the Patriotic War.

== Biography ==
Nail Ibrahimli was born on 4 March 1994 in Khachmaz village of Oghuz District. He served as a machine gunner in military operations in several regions, including Murovdağ, Fuzuli, Cebrail, Gubadlı, Zengilan, Laçin, and Shusha in the Second Karabakh War, which began on 27 September 2020.

He employed tactics similar to those used in battles near the Lachin Corridor and the Hudafarin Bridge. His responsibilities included operating heavy weapons, carrying out complex missions, and contributing to the progress of military operations in those areas.

He was killed in action during clashes near the city of Shusha on 8 November. His death was confirmed in the following days, and he was buried on 12 November in Martyrs' Street in Khachmaz village, Oghuz region.

Earlier in the war, İbrahimli was involved in operations in the Murovdağ region, contributing to the capture of positions such as Gamışdağ and Ömer Pass. He later took part in offensives in Fuzuli, Khojavend, Gubadlı, and Zangilan, helping to secure strategic locations and support Azerbaijan’s territorial objectives.

As a machine gunner, he played a role in major offensives, including the operations for the Murov peak, the Hudafarin bridges, and the Azerbaijan-Iran border. Following the capture of Gubadlı, he participated in operations toward the Lachin corridor, influencing the course of the conflict.

== Death ==
Major Elvin Safarov stated that Second Lieutenant Nail İbrahimli played a significant role in the war, taking on challenging tasks as a machine gunner and using weapons such as the 'Assault' and 'PK' machine guns. He was assigned an important mission to support Azerbaijan’s advance toward Shusha and strengthen its combat position.

During the "Dot" operation, İbrahimli's platoon secured a tactical advantage, leading to their next assignment in Shusha on 8 November 2020. He participated in a counter-attack during this operation but was killed in action. He was laid to rest in the Martyrs' Hiyaban in Khachmaz village.

== Awards ==
- (09.12.2020) — "Hero of the Patriotic War" medal (posthumous)
- (15.12.2020) — "For the Fatherland" medal (posthumous)
- (29.12.2020) — "For the Liberation of Shusha Medal" medal (posthumous)
- (05.11.2022) — "For the Liberation of Khojavend Medal" medal" (posthumously)
- (05.11.2022) — "For the liberation of Fuzuli" medal (posthumous)

== Legacy and commemorations ==
- To honor his service, several places have been named after Nail İbrahimli:
  1. High School No. 3 in Oghuz City was renamed after Nail İbrahimli, in recognition of his heroism.
  2. A street in Khachmaz village, Oghuz region, has been named in his honor.
