= Azad Humbatov =

Hero of the Patriotic War (1996–2020)

- Native name: Azad Hümbətov
- Born: January 24, 1996; Baku, Azerbaijan
- Died: October 27, 2020 (aged 24) Lachin District
- Buried: Second Alley of Honor
- Allegiance: Azerbaijan
- Branch: Azerbaijani Land Forces
- Rank: Senior lieutenant
- Conflicts: Second Karabakh War
- Awards: Hero of the Patriotic War

Azad Arif oglu Humbatov (Azad Arif oğlu Hümbətov; January 24, 1996 – October 27, 2020) was a senior lieutenant of the Azerbaijani Armed Forces, a participant of the Second Karabakh War and Hero of the Patriotic War.

== Biography ==
Azad Humbatov was born on January 24, 1996, in Baku. He was originally from the village of Ashagi Shorzha. He graduated from Baku City Ecology Lyceum No. 291 in the Nərimanov raion. In 2013, he was admitted to the tank unit specialization at the Azerbaijan Higher Military Academy named after Heydar Aliyev and graduated in 2017 with the rank of lieutenant. That same year, he was assigned to his post at a military unit in the city of Horadiz, Fuzuli district.

In 2018, during the military event held on the occasion of the "100th anniversary of the Azerbaijani Army," he served as the standard-bearer in the front row. Following this, he was awarded the "100th Anniversary of the Azerbaijani Army (1918–2018)" jubilee medal.

Azad Humbatov completed a 45-day officer training course at the Training and Education Center of the Armed Forces in Baku, after which he was promoted to the rank of senior lieutenant.

== Military service ==
In the Second Karabakh War, which lasted from September 27 to November 10, 2020, Azad Humbatov actively participated in battles in the Fuzuli, Gubadli, and Lachin directions. As a tank platoon commander, he risked his life to capture five enemy tanks and bring them to his positions. He also repeatedly managed to rescue his wounded comrades from enemy encirclement.

At the beginning of the war, the tank under his command hit a Land mine. He sustained an injury to his leg, and upon seeing that his tank driver had suffered more severe wounds, he carried him on his back for 25 kilometers through forested terrain. After two days, he successfully brought him back to their combat post. Following this incident, Humbatov was sent to a hospital in Beylagan for treatment. However, he left his treatment incomplete and returned to the battlefield.

During the battles, he was reassigned from commanding a tank unit to leading an infantry combat unit where he was needed.

On October 27, 2020, while returning with his unit during the battles for Lachin, he was targeted by enemy artillery fire, sustained severe injuries, and died before reaching the hospital. Humbatov was buried in the Second Alley of Honor.

For his bravery in the Second Karabakh War, Azad Humbatov was posthumously awarded the title of Hero of the Patriotic War on December 9, 2020. He was also posthumously awarded the For the Fatherland Medal on December 15, 2020, for "his participation in combat operations ensuring the territorial integrity of Azerbaijan and for honorably fulfilling his military duties during the execution of assigned tasks". Additionally, on December 25, 2020, he was awarded the For the Liberation of Fuzuli Medal and the For the Liberation of Khojavend Medal.

== Legacy ==
In 2021, the 291st Ecology Lyceum in Baku was named after Azad Humbatov. In December 2021, a central street in Baku was also named in his honor.

Personal belongings of Azad Humbatov were handed over by his family to the Second Karabakh War fund of the National Museum of History of Azerbaijan.

== Awards ==
- Azerbaijani Army 100th Anniversary Medal (2018)
- Hero of the Patriotic War (9 December 2020)
- For the Fatherland Medal (15 December 2020)
- For the Liberation of Fuzuli Medal (25 December 2020)
- For the Liberation of Khojavend Medal (25 December 2020)
