= 518th Fighter Aviation Regiment =

- Active: 1941–1998
- Country: Soviet Union; Russia
- Branch: Soviet Air Forces; Soviet Air Defense Forces; Russian Air Defense Forces
- Type: Fighter aviation regiment
- Garrison/HQ: Talagi (1964–1998)
- Engagements: World War II; Korean War
- Decorations: Order of Suvorov 3rd class
- Battle honours: Berlin

The 518th Fighter Aviation Regiment (Russian: 518-й истребительный авиационный полк; Military Unit Number 42192) was a fighter aviation regiment of the Soviet Air Forces during World War II that became part of the Soviet Air Defence Forces after the end of the war.

The 518th fought in the Korean War during the final year of the conflict as part of the 64th Fighter Aviation Corps. It was relocated to provide air defense for Arkhangelsk after returning to the Soviet Union in 1953. It successively operated the Mikoyan-Gurevich MiG-17, Tupolev Tu-128, and Mikoyan MiG-31 interceptors from Talagi before its 1998 disbandment during the reform of the Russian Air Defense Forces.

== World War II ==
The 518th Fighter Aviation Regiment (IAP) was formed between September and November 1941 under the 13th Reserve Aviation Regiment of the Volga Military District at Kuznetsk under shtat 015/174 (two squadrons with 9 fighters each in addition to two more in headquarters flight), equipped with the Yakovlev Yak-1. Its first commander was Captain (later Major) Yakov Okolelov. After completing training, the regiment was transferred to the 141st Fighter Aviation Division (IAD) PVO of the Kuybyshev PVO Region at Kryazh on 13 November, but did not participate in combat. On 1 January 1942 the regiment left the division and was sent to the Chkalovskaya airfield of the Moscow Military District. On 16 January, it joined the 140th Fighter Aviation Division of the VVS Kalinin Front and began flying combat missions. With 140 IAD, the regiment flew 177 combat sorties, losing nine aircraft and eight pilots. Squadron commander Junior Lieutenant Dmitry Kovtyulev gained ace status on 15 February when he claimed the last of his five victories, the only one that he was credited with as a pilot of the 518th, but was shot down in the same action and severely wounded. He was made a Hero of the Soviet Union in recognition, but would not fly again.

518 IAP was withdrawn to the 8th Reserve IAP of the Volga Military District at Bagay-Baranovka for rebuilding on 16 March. Sent to the North Caucasus Front on 21 June, the regiment joined its 5th Air Army and began combat missions with 237 IAD of the army on 23 June. It received four Lavochkin-Gorbunov-Gudkov LaGG-3 and one Yak-1 from 166 IAP on 4 July 1942. Transferred to 236 IAD of the army on 20 July, the 518th was shifted with its division and army to the Black Sea Group of Forces of the Transcaucasian Front on 1 August. During July and August, the 518th received replacement LaGG-3s from other regiments of the front. The regiment flew 2,015 combat sorties with 237 and 236 IADs, losing 44 aircraft and thirteen pilots. In 1942, the regiment was credited with 75 aerial victories and thirteen aircraft destroyed on the ground. During the Battle of the Caucasus pilot Junior Lieutenant Sergey Shchirov claimed thirteen of his eventual eighteen victories while serving with the 518th and was made a Hero of the Soviet Union. On 3 December, it was withdrawn to the 26th Reserve IAP of the front at Sandary, Georgia to reorganize under shtat 015/284, three squadrons with a total of 32 fighters including the two in headquarters flight.

The regiment was sent back to the 19th Reserve IAP of the Siberian Military District at Ob to convert to the new Yak-9 fighter on 5 January 1943. After finishing its re-equipping, the 518th returned to the active army on 8 May and on 20 May entered the Reserve of the Supreme High Command (RVGK) while based at Lyubertsy in the Moscow Military District. The 518th flew to the Zemlyansk airfield on 9 June, operating in the 5th Air Army area of operations. On 23 June it joined 323 IAD of the 8th Fighter Aviation Corps (IAK) of the RVGK, stationed in the Steppe Military District. The regiment resumed combat missions on 8 July with its corps and division, part of the 1st Air Army of the Western Front. With 323 IAD, it flew 913 combat sorties with losses of 25 aircraft and 13 pilots, while being credited with 25 aerial victories. Okolelov was relieved of duty due to illness on 6 September and replaced by Major Ivan Taldykin until 11 November. The 518th was withdrawn to the RVGK on 24 September with its division and corps, then conducted combat training. On 25 October it was withdrawn to the 13th Reserve IAP at Kuznetsk for rebuilding, and there reorganized under shtat 015/364 between 1 November and 1 February 1944. Under the new structure, the regiment included three squadrons with a total of 40 combat aircraft including four in headquarters flight. During this period, Major (later Lieutenant Colonel) Nikolay Khudokormov took command of the regiment on 22 November; he would remain in command for the rest of the war.

The 518th joined the newly formed 193 IAD of the RVGK, part of the VVS Kharkov Military District at Bely Kholodez on 4 February, and with the division transferred to the VVS Odessa Military District on 1 June 1944, stationed at Khmelevoye. With 193 IAD, the regiment joined 13 IAK of the RVGK on 30 May. The 518th reentered operations on 7 July with the division and corps, joining the 6th Air Army of the 1st Belorussian Front to fly its first combat sorties on 18 July. Together with the 193 IAD and 13 IAK, the 518th was withdrawn to the RVGK in the second echelon of the front on 8 September. It conducted training until resuming operations with its division and corps on 25 November, now with the 16th Air Army of the front. For its "exemplary performance of combat missions" in the capture of Radom and for "demonstrated valor and courage," the 518th received the Order of Suvorov, 3rd class, on 19 February 1945. It ended the war supporting the Berlin Offensive, and on 11 June was awarded the Berlin honorific for distinguishing itself in the Battle of Berlin. With 193 IAD, the 518th flew 2,155 combat sorties with losses of 45 aircraft and 23 pilots. The regiment was credited with 45 aerial victories in 1944 and 55 in 1945, in addition to three destroyed on the ground in 1945.

During the war, the vast majority of the 518th's combat sorties – 4,222 out of 5,260 total – were to provide air cover to Soviet forces. The regiment was credited with 200 aerial victories during the war, overwhelmingly fighters, and with sixteen aircraft destroyed on the ground. In ground attacks, it was credited with destroying 284 vehicles, 39 freight cars, four barges, six locomotives, two tank cars, and suppressing 31 anti-aircraft batteries. The regiment lost a total of 100 aircraft in battle, including 62 in air combat, and 23 more to accidents or written off. By type, these were nine LaGG-3 in 1942, 44 Yak-1, and 70 Yak-9. The 518th lost 61 pilots, including 57 killed in combat, with 1942 being the deadliest year with 21 lost to all causes.

== Postwar ==
The regiment was based at Schönefeld Airport from the end of the war in May to December. After the disbandment of 193 IAD in December, the regiment joined 282 IAD of the 16th Air Army of the Group of Soviet Occupation Forces in Germany. In January 1946 it was relocated to the Osnova Airport near Kharkov with the 282 IAD. 282 IAD was renumbered 216 IAD in 1949, and in that year transferred to the Baku Air Defense Army. The 518th was accordingly relocated to Kala airfield near Baku. Between 5 July 1952 and 27 July 1953, the regiment served with 216 IAD as part of the 64th Fighter Aviation Corps in the Korean War, flying MiG-15s. It was credited with destroying 38 UN aircraft, while losing fifteen aircraft and five pilots. Captain Mikhail Mikhin was credited with nine victories during the regiment's tour and was made a Hero of the Soviet Union.

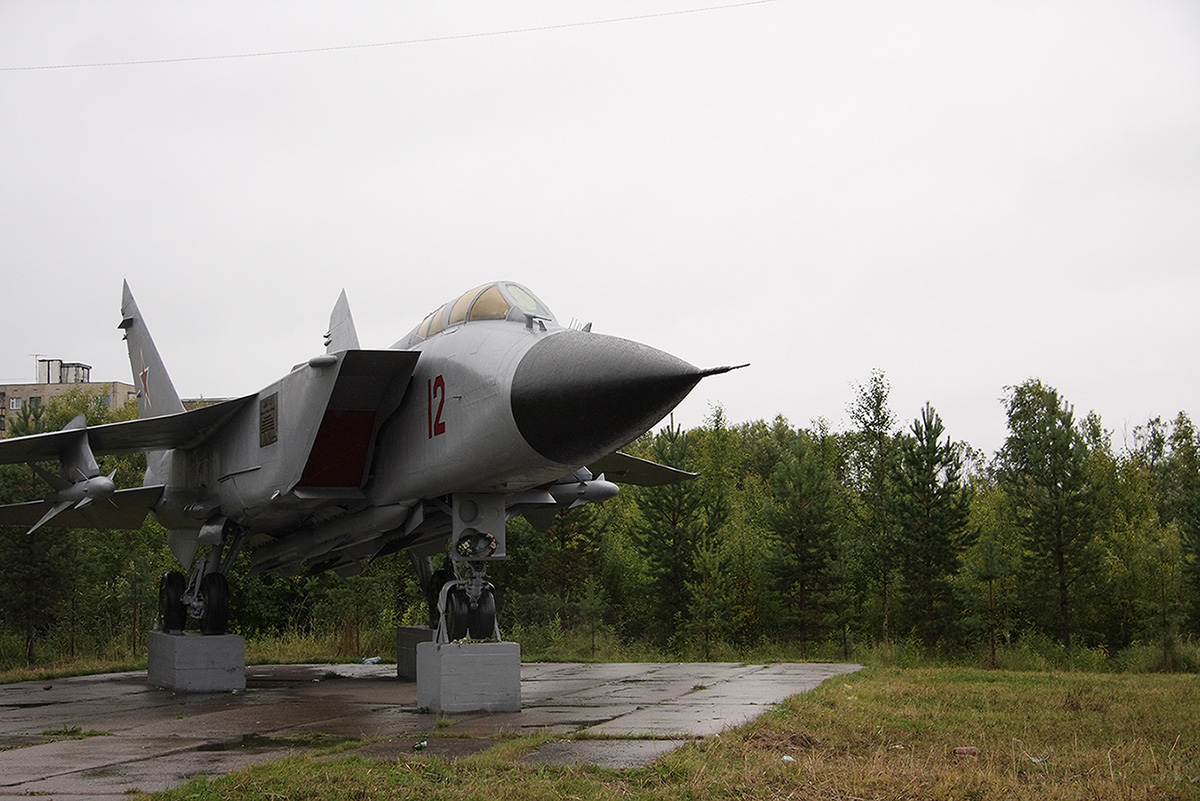
A MiG-31 of the regiment displayed as a memorial at Talagi

In late 1953, the regiment received the new Mikoyan-Gurevich MiG-17 interceptor, and was relocated to Vaskovo Airport near Arkhangelsk, remaining part of 216 IAD. In the 1960 reforms of the Soviet Air Defense Forces, 216 IAD headquarters was used to form the 23rd Air Defense Division of the 10th Independent Air Defence Army, and the 518th continued its service as part of the 23rd Air Defense Division. Subsequently, the 518th was relocated to nearby Talagi Airport. Between 1966 and 1967, the 518th converted to the Tupolev Tu-128 long-range interceptor. In the mid-1980s, the regiment was re-equipped with the new Mikoyan MiG-31 interceptor. According to CFE Treaty data, the regiment had 31 MiG-31s assigned on 19 November 1990. The 518th continued in service with the 23rd Air Defense Division when it was renamed the 22nd Air Defense Corps as a result of reorganization and force reduction in 1993 and then became the 22nd Air Defense Division of the 6th Independent Air Defense Army a year later when the 10th Independent Air Defense Army was disbanded. The 518th was disbanded on 9 September 1998 during the merger of the Russian Air and Air Defense Forces.
