= National Defense University (Azerbaijan) =

Military university established in 2016 and primarily located in Baku

Azerbaijani National Defence University
- Milli Müdafiə Universiteti
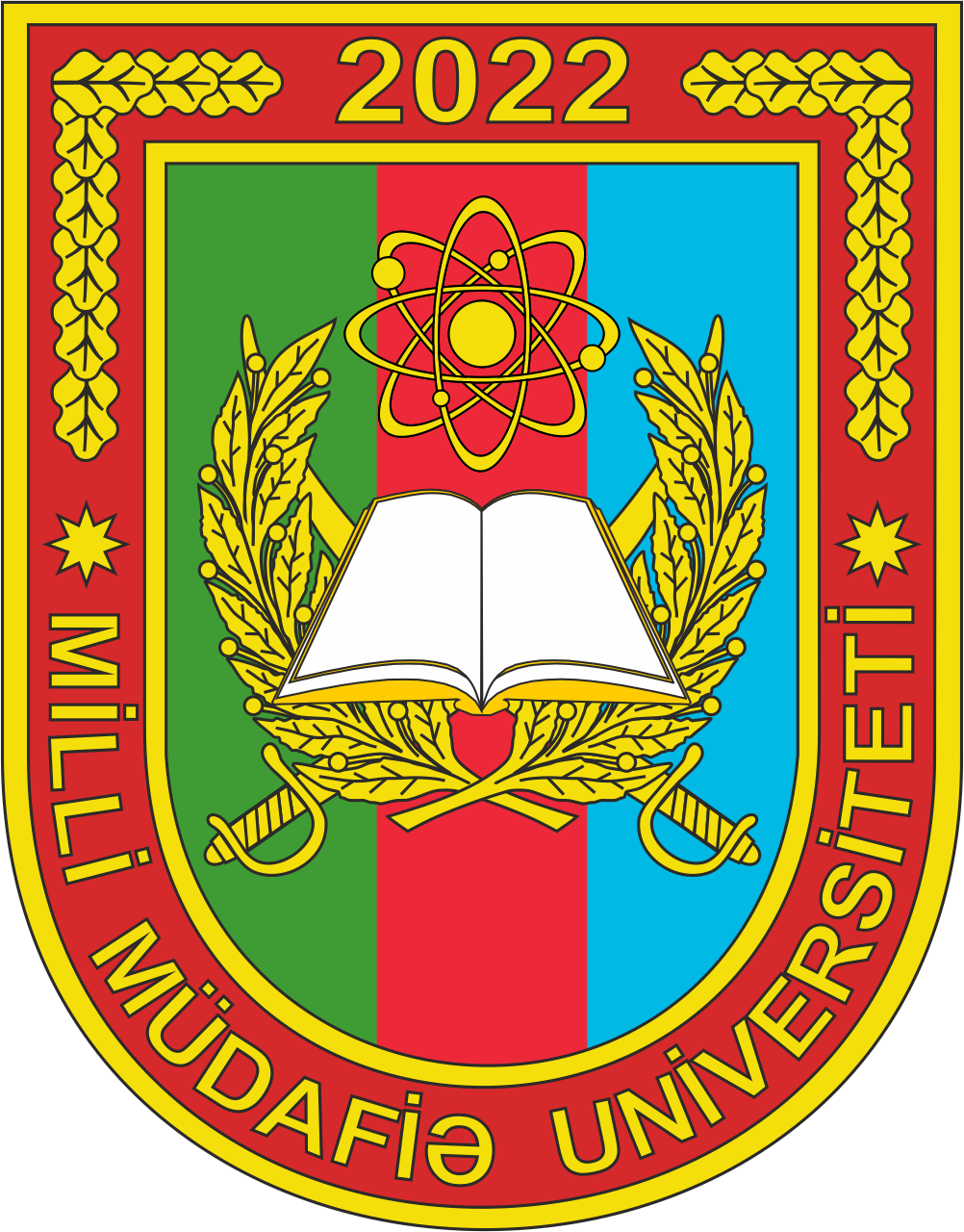
- Type: Military university
- Established: 2022
- Rector: Major General Gunduz Abdulov
- Faculty: Baku
- Location: Baku, Azerbaijan
- Website: https://mmu.edu.az/

National Defense University (Azerbaijani: Milli Müdafiə Universiteti) is a military university established in 2022 and primarily located in Baku, Azerbaijan. The university is based on the Turkish National Defense University as part of an effort to make the Azerbaijani Armed Forces mirror the Turkish Armed Forces.

== History ==
In June 2022, the professor, Lieutenant General Heydar Piriyev, who previously headed the War College of the Azerbaijani Armed Forces, started working as a rector. The National Defense University was established in 2022 by the order of the President Ilham Aliyev. On May 22, 2024, Baku Military College, Ganja Military College, and Nakhchivan Military College were established under the auspices of the National Defense University.

== Composition ==
Name	Logo	City	Description
Institutes
Heydar Aliyev Military Institute		Baku	Formerly the Azerbaijan Higher Military Academy.
Military Scientific Research Institute		Baku	
Military Administration Institute		Baku	
Military Colleges
Baku Military College		Baku	
Ganja Military College		Ganja	
Nakhchivan Military College		Nakhchivan	
Military Lyceums
Jamshid Nakhchivanski Military Lyceum		Baku	
Heydar Aliyev Military Lyceum		Nakhchivan	
Faculties
Military Medical Faculty of Azerbaijan Medical University		Baku	
Other
Training and Education Center of the Armed Forces		Baku	
Secondary Military Medical School of Azerbaijan			

== Rectors ==
- Heydar Piriyev (2022–2024)
- Gunduz Abdulov (January 12, 2024)
