= Caspian Guard Initiative =

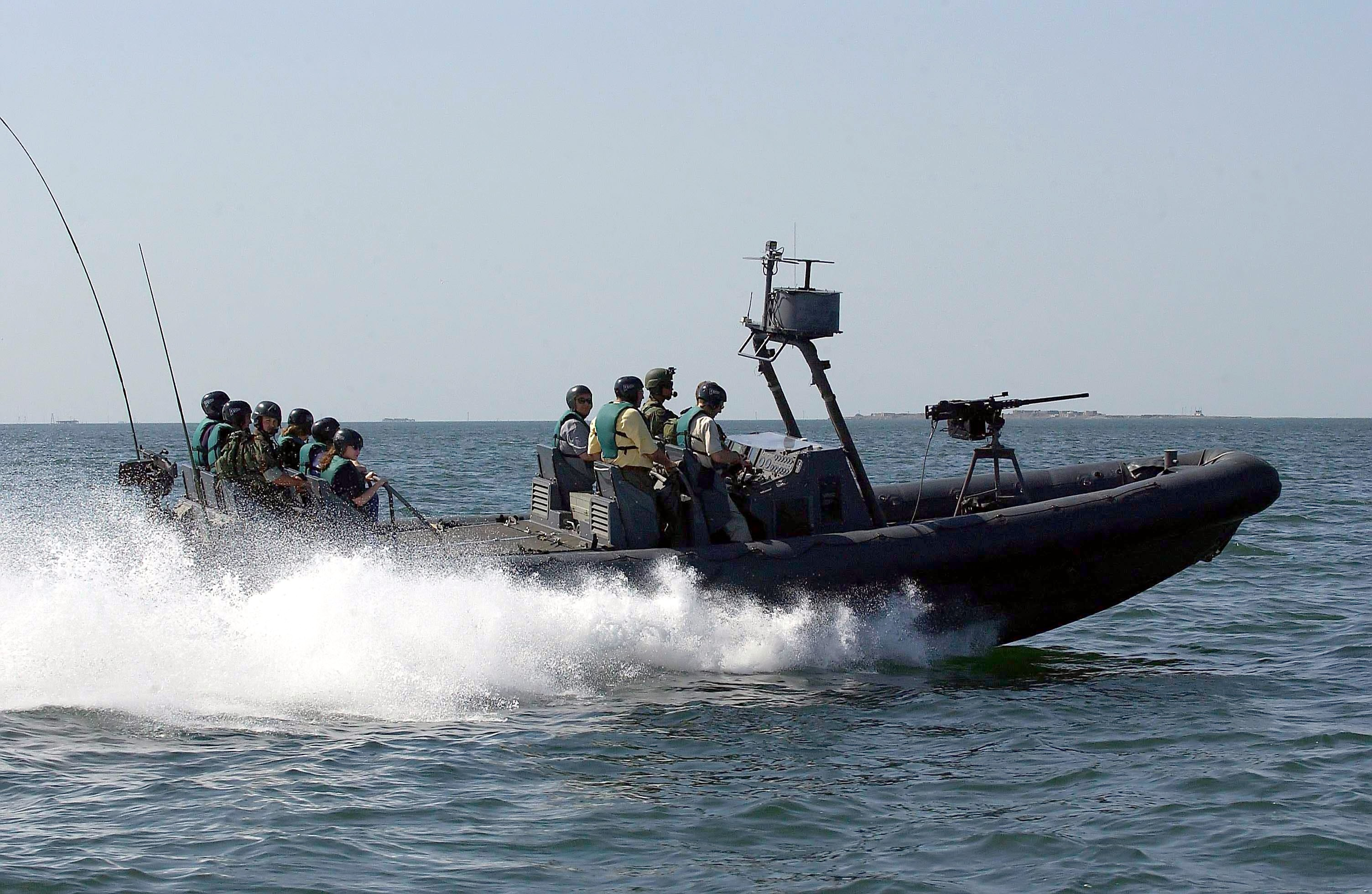
Participants in the 2004 Joint Civilian Orientation Conference take a ride in a US Navy special operations rigid inflatable boat during a visit to Baku, Azerbaijan, June 9.

The Caspian Guard Initiative is a United States Department of Defense regional security program. The program is designed to coordinate activities in Azerbaijan and Kazakhstan with those of U.S. Central Command and other U.S. government agencies to enhance Caspian Sea security. The program is officially described as assisting the two countries in improving their ability to prevent and, if needed, respond to terrorism, nuclear proliferation, drug and human trafficking, and other transnational threats in the Caspian region. United States European Command is responsible for operations in Azerbaijan.
