= Baku Kala Air Base =

Military airbase in Baku, Azerbaijan

- IATA: none; ICAO: UB18

Summary
- Airport type: Military
- Operator: Azerbaijani Air Force
- Location: Baku, Azerbaijan
- Elevation AMSL: 40 ft / 12 m
- Coordinates: 40°24′23″N 050°12′00″E

Map
- Location of air base in Azerbaijan

Runways
Direction	Length		Surface
Direction	m	ft	Surface
18/36	2,643	8,670	Concrete
- Source: DAFIF

Baku Kala Air Base is a military airbase in Baku (also known as Bakü or Baki), the capital of Azerbaijan.

The 518th Fighter Aviation Regiment of the PVO was located at Baku Kala from 1949 to 1952.

After the collapse of the Soviet Armed Forces, aircraft were relocated to airfields in Russia, and the Azerbaijani Air Force used the airport. Currently, the 843rd Mixed Aviation Regiment of the Azerbaijani Air Force is located here.

== Facilities ==
The air base resides at an elevation of 40 feet (12 m) above mean sea level. It has one runway designated 18/36 with a concrete surface measuring 2,643 by 40 metres (8,671 ft × 131 ft).

== See also ==
- List of airports in Azerbaijan
