= Heydar Aliyev Military Lyceum =

- Heydər Əliyev adına Hərbi Lisey
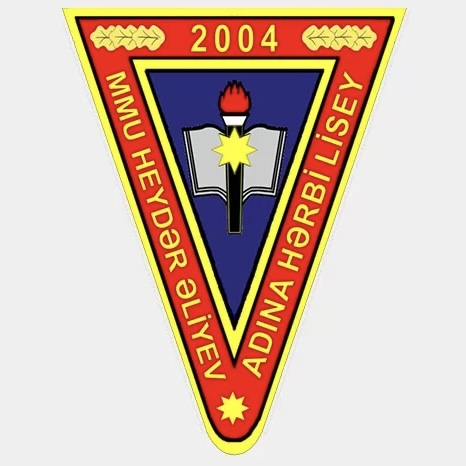
- MMU - Heydər Əliyev adına Hərbi Lisey

Location
- Nakhchivan Autonomous Republic; Nakhchivan; Azerbaijan

Information
- Former name: Nakhchivan branch of Jamshid Nakhchivanski Military Lyceum (1998–2004)
- Type: Military school
- Motto: For the sake of United Azerbaijan
- Established: 2004
- Director: Acting director Rashad Asgarov

Heydar Aliyev Military Lyceum (from 1998 to 2004: Nakhchivan branch of Jamshid Nakhchivanski Military Lyceum) is a branch of the Jamshid Nakhchivanski Military Lyceum established in the Nakhchivan Autonomous Republic by the order of the President of Azerbaijan dated 13 March 1998 and the decree of the Minister of Defence dated 9 April 1998.

On 5 March 2022, it was placed under the subordination of the National Defense University (Azerbaijan).

== Participation in military parades ==
Cadets of the Lyceum took part in the Day of the Armed Forces of Azerbaijan parade in 2018.

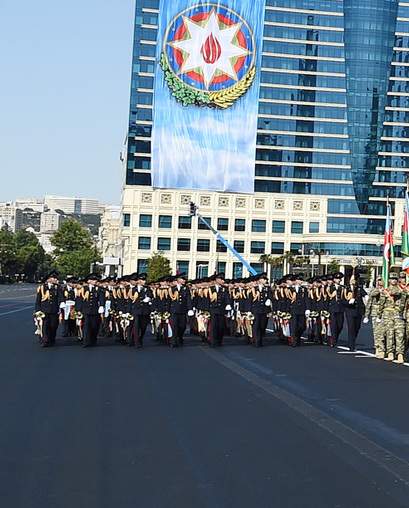
Cadets of the Heydar Aliyev Military Lyceum at the 2018 Armed Forces Day parade in Baku.

== History ==
It was established in 1998 by decree of President Heydar Aliyev dated to 13 March and by the order of Defence Minister Safar Abiyev on 9 April. It was officially opened on 13 October 1999. Speaking about the need to establish this institution, Aliyev said that "Historically, young people from Nakhchivan tended to become officers", primarily referencing the "six generals in the army of Tsarist Russia from the Kangarli dynasty". At the time of its creation, it had 56 cadets. It was abolished by decree of President Ilham Aliyev on 27 February 2004 and was renamed after Heydar Aliyev, who had died over two months prior.

== Activities ==
Over a year later after its renaming in December 2005, Aliyev visited the lyceum. In June 2019, Minister of National Defense of Turkey Hulusi Akar visited the lyceum alongside his Azeri counterpart Zakir Hasanov, where he got acquainted with the conditions at the lyceum.

Cadets of the lyceum are participants in all military parades in Azerbaijan, including national parades in Baku, usually holding trumpets. On Independence Day in October 2017, a military parade through the capital of the republic in honor of the 25th anniversary of the establishment of the first Azeri military unit saw the participation of the lyceum. During the Baku Victory Parade of 2020, a detached formation from the lyceum for the first took part in a Baku parade.

== Student life and operations ==
Along with the youth of the autonomous republic, youth from other regions of the country also study at the lyceum. Boys who have completed the 8th grade and reached the age of 14 can be admitted to the lyceum with a 3-year education period. Over 3,000 graduates from the military lyceum have entered higher military educational institutions Azerbaijan and abroad, with about 2,000 currently serving as officers of the Armed Forces. A 25-bed medical center, a gym, a football field, outdoor and indoor sports facilities and other facilities are used by the cadets. The official march of the school is the Military High School Anthem (Hərbi lisey marşı).

== List of heads ==
- Major General Rasim Aliyev (circa December 2005)
- Major General Elman Orujov
- Major General Mahammad Hasanov (since 13 April 2019)

Among the roles that is filled is the post of Adviser to the Chief of the Military Lyceum, which can be filled by person with military experience. An example of this would be Turkish Armed Forces officer Safa Aydin, who served with the lyceum in its early years.

== See also ==
- National Defense University (Azerbaijan)
- Jamshid Nakhchivanski Military Lyceum
