= For the Fatherland Medal =

"Vətən uğrunda" medal
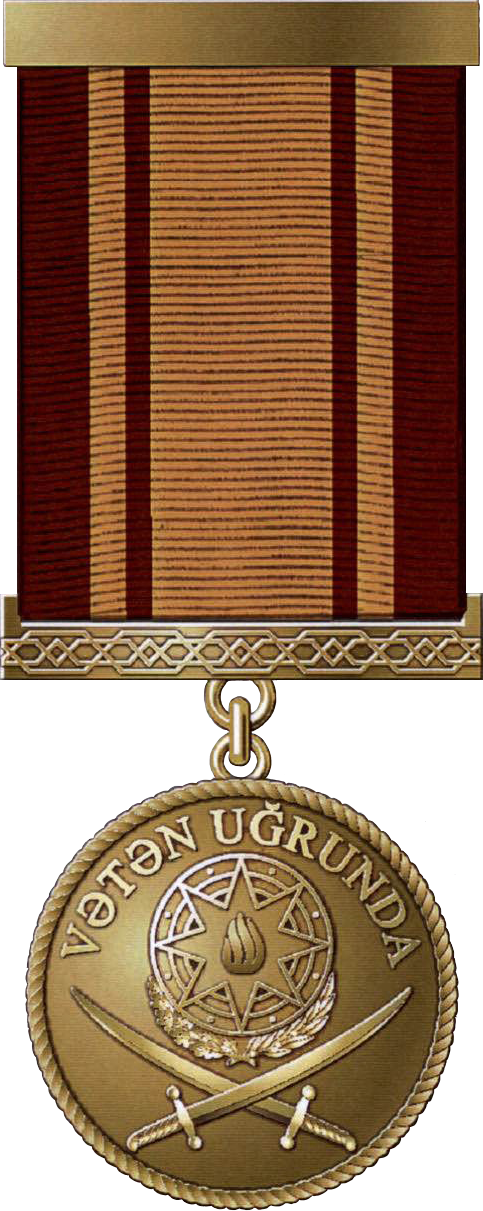
- Type: Medal
- Country: Azerbaijan
- Status: Active

The "Vətən uğrunda" medalı - Medal "For the Homeland" - is a state award of the Republic of Azerbaijan. It was established on 10 November 1992 and its charter was approved on 29 December 1998.

== History ==
The "For the Homeland" medal was created by the President of the Republic of Azerbaijan, Abulfaz Elchibey Aliyev, by Law No. 370, dated to November 10, 1992.

The status of the medal was approved by Law No. 608-IQ of the Republic of Azerbaijan on December 29, 1998. According to the regulations, the medal is awarded to someone for:

- Their participation in ensuring the territorial integrity of the Republic of Azerbaijan;
- Their activities to ensure the national security of the state;
- Their participation in the defense of the state structure.

The Medal of the Republic of Azerbaijan "For the Homeland" is worn on the left side of the chest after orders, if there are other orders and medals.

== Description ==
There are two descriptions of the "For the Homeland" medal.

The first image of the medal was approved by the Law No. 34-IIQ of the Republic of Azerbaijan, on December 8, 2000. The definition of medal is as follows:

The medal "For the Fatherland" consists of a beam plate with a diameter of 36 mm, cast in bronze, with a decoration along its perimeter.

The coat of arms of the Republic of Azerbaijan is located in the middle of the medal, and two crossed swords are shown underneath. Above the coat of arms, the inscription "For the Motherland" is written along the circle. The text and pictures are eye-catching.

The reverse side has a smooth surface and the medal's number is engraved in the middle.

The medal is attached via a ring and ring to a 27mm x 43mm thin rectangular plate wrapped in black ribbon in a dark and light oak tone. At the bottom of the plate there is a ring-shaped rectangular protrusion in the style of a national ornament, and on the back there is a corresponding fastening element for fastening to clothing.

The medal is accompanied by a 27mm x 9mm die made from the same black ribbon, with a crescent and star design, and an element to be attached to clothing.

- First description of the medal

The second, and current, definition of the medal was approved by the Law of the Republic of Azerbaijan No. 730-IVQD on September 30, 2013. The description of the medal is as follows:

The medal "For the Fatherland" consists of a circular plate with a diameter of 36 mm, cast in bronze, with a decoration along its perimeter.

There is the State coat of arms of the Republic of Azerbaijan in the middle of the medal, and two crossed swords underneath. The phrase "For the Homeland" is written on the upper part of the state coat of arms of the Republic of Azerbaijan. The text and pictures are eye-catching.

The back has a smooth surface and the series and number of the medal are engraved in the middle.

The medal is attached to a 37mm x 50mm rectangular black ribbon that includes a loop and ring for attachment to clothing. Three stripes are depicted in the middle of the black ribbon of dark oak color. All three light oak colored stripes are 15mm wide at the centre, with 3mm wide stripes spaced along the edges, 2mm away from the center stripe. A 40 mm x 5 mm gold layer with a 40 mm x 7 mm national ornament image is adhered to the top of the black stripe.

The medal is accompanied by a 37 mm x 10 mm die made from the same black ribbon and containing an element for attachment to clothing.

— Second description of the medal
