= For the Liberation of Fuzuli Medal =

Military medal of Azerbaijan

For the Liberation of Fuzuli Medal «Füzulinin azad olunmasına görə» medalı
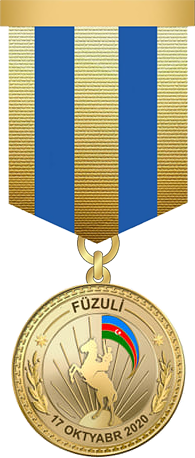
- Type: Individual Award
- Awarded for: The Liberation of Fuzuli.
- Status: Active
- Established: 20 November 2020

Precedence
- Next (higher): For the Liberation of Khojavend Medal
- Next (lower): For the Liberation of Zangilan Medal

The For the Liberation of Fuzuli Medal (Azerbaijani: «Füzulinin azad olunmasına görə» medalı) is a medal of Azerbaijan. The medal was created on the occasion of Azerbaijan being the victor in the Second Nagorno-Karabakh War.

== History ==
On 11 November 2020, the President of Azerbaijan, Ilham Aliyev, at a meeting with wounded Azerbaijani servicemen who took part in the Second Nagorno-Karabakh War, said that new orders and medals would be established in Azerbaijan, and that he gave appropriate instructions on awarding civilians and servicemen who showed "heroism on the battlefield and in the rear and distinguished themselves in this war." He also proposed the names of these orders and medals. On 20 November 2020, at a plenary session of the Azerbaijani National Assembly, a draft bill on amendments to the bill "On the establishment of orders and medals of the Republic of Azerbaijan" was submitted for discussion.

The For the Liberation of Fuzuli Medal was established on the same day in the first reading in accordance with the bill "On the establishment of orders and medals of the Republic of Azerbaijan" on the occasion of Azerbaijan being the victor in the Second Nagorno-Karabakh War.

== Status ==
According to the bill "On the establishment of orders and medals of the Republic of Azerbaijan", the medal's senior award is the For the Liberation of Zangilan Medal, while its junior award is the For the Liberation of Shusha Medal.
