= Faig Gasimov =

Azerbaijani military officer (1974–2020)

- Native name: Faiq Qaçay oğlu Qasımov
- Born: Faig Gachay oglu Gasimov; February 10, 1974; Qayalı, Gubadly, Azerbaijani SSR, Soviet Union
- Died: September 27, 2020 (aged 46) Fuzuli District, Azerbaijan
- Buried: Second Alley of Honor
- Allegiance: Azerbaijani Armed Forces
- Branch: Azerbaijani Land Forces
- Service years: 1992–2020
- Rank: Lieutenant colonel
- Conflicts: First Nagorno-Karabakh War; Four-Day War; Second Nagorno-Karabakh War †
- Awards: For Faultless Service Medal; Hero of the Patriotic War Medal

Faig Gachay oglu Gasımov (Azerbaijani: Faiq Qaçay oğlu Qasımov) was an Azerbaijani lieutenant colonel serving in the Land Forces of Azerbaijani Armed Forces. He had taken part in the First Nagorno-Karabakh War, the 2016 Nagorno-Karabakh conflict and the 2020 Nagorno-Karabakh war, in which he was killed. He had received the title of the Hero of the Patriotic War for his service during the war.

== Life ==
Gasimov was born on 10 February 1974, in the Gubadly District of the Azerbaijan SSR, which was then part of the Soviet Union. In 1981, he entered the Gayaly Village Secondary School. Now, it is named after Hasanglulu Gasimov, who was his brother and was killed in the First Nagorno-Karabakh War. Gasimov graduated from this school in 1991. Six members of the Gasimov family had fought in the first war.

== Military service ==
He had completed his military service as an artilleryman in the First Nagorno-Karabakh War. In this war, he had fought in the battalion of Aliyar Aliyev, a National Hero of Azerbaijan. After military service Gasimov entered the Azerbaijan Higher Military Academy in 1993 and after 2 years graduated this academy. He had served in Nakhchevan from 1995 to 2009 and after 2009 till 2010 in Balakan. In 2010 he was voluntarily assigned to Fizuli District. He was also veteran of 2016 Nagorno-Karabakh conflict. For his involvement in this conflict he was awarded the Azerbaijani Flag Order by the decree of the Azerbaijani President Ilham Aliyev. Gasimov was especially active in breaking the "Ohanyan Line" during the clashes. He was killed on 27 September in the early stages of the 2020 Nagorno-Karabakh war. He was the first high-ranking officer who was killed during 2020 Nagorno-Karabakh war from Azerbaijan side.

== Awards ==
- — "For Distinction in Military Service" medal
- — "For Faultless Service" medal (I degree)
- — "For Faultless Service" medal (II degree)
- — "For Faultless Service" medal (III degree)
- — "Veteran of Azerbaijani Armed Forces" medal
- — Gasimov was awarded the "10th Anniversary of the Armed Forces of the Republic of Azerbaijan (1991–2001)" Medal by the decree of the President Aliyev.
- — Gasimov was awarded the "90th Anniversary of the Armed Forces of Azerbaijan (1918–2008)" Medal by the decree of the President of Azerbaijan, Ilham Aliyev.
- — Gasimov was awarded the "95th Anniversary of the Armed Forces of Azerbaijan (1918–2013)" Medal by the decree of the President Aliyev.
- — Gasimov was awarded the Azerbaijani Flag Order in 2016 by the decree of the President Aliyev.
- — Azerbaijani Army 100th anniversary medal
- (09.12.2020) — Gasimov was awarded the title of the Hero of the Patriotic War on 9 December 2020, by the decree of the President Aliyev.
- — Gasimov was awarded the "For Fatherland" Medal on 15 December 2020, by the decree of the President Aliyev.
- (25.12.2020) — For the Liberation of Khojavend Medal
- (25.12.2020) — For the Liberation of Fuzuli Medal

== See also ==
- Shikhamir Gaflanov
- Ramiz Jafarov
