= Qayalı =

Qayalı or Kayaly may refer to:

- Qayalı, Barda, Azerbaijan
- Qayalı, Jalilabad, Azerbaijan
- Qayalı, Qubadli, Azerbaijan
