= Faig =

Faig is both a given name and a surname. Notable people with the name include:

- Faig Aghayev (born 1971), Azerbaijani singer
- Faig Ahmed (born 1982), Azerbaijani artist
- Faig Azizov (born 1966), Azerbaijani footballer
- Faig Garayev (born 1959), Azerbaijani volleyball coach
- Faig Gasimov (1974-2020), Azerbaijani lieutenant colonel
- Faig Hajiyev (born 1999), Azerbaijani footballer
- Faig Jabbarov (born 1972), Azerbaijani footballer
- Faig Mammadov (1929–1987), Azerbaijani agronomist
- Mario Faig (1905–1984), Argentine film actor
- Miquel Faig, Spanish economist
- Omar Faig Nemanzadeh (1872-1937), Azerbaijani publicist
