= Shahin Allahyarov =

Azerbaijani military officer (1993–2020)

- Native name: Şahin Hüseynbala oğlu Allahyarov
- Born: Shahin Huseinbala oglu Allahyarov; January 29, 1993; Shamakhi District, Azerbaijan
- Died: November 1, 2020 (aged 27) Shusha District, Azerbaijan
- Allegiance: Azerbaijani Armed Forces
- Branch: Azerbaijani Special Forces
- Service years: 2016–2020
- Rank: Starshy praporshchik
- Conflicts: Second Nagorno-Karabakh War; Battle of Shusha †
- Awards: Hero of the Patriotic War Medal

Shahin Huseinbala oglu Allahyarov (Azerbaijani: Şahin Hüseynbala oğlu Allahyarov) was an Azerbaijani military officer.

== Early life ==
Shahin Allahyarov was born on 29 January 1993, in Phashali, Shamakhi District of the Azerbaijan. He has been living in Guba region since 1995.

== Military service ==
Shahin Allahyarov took part in the 2020 Nagorno-Karabakh war, which started on 27 September. Participating in the Aras Valley campaign, he fought in the offensives in Jabrayil, and Fuzuli. Shahin Allahyarov was shot on November 1, 2020, during a combat mission in Shusha between Armenian and Azerbaijani servicemen.

== Awards ==
- Allahyarov was awarded the title of the Hero of the Patriotic War on 9 December 2020, by the decree of the President Aliyev.
- Allahyarov was awarded the For Fatherland Medal for the second time on 15 December 2020, by the decree of the President Aliyev.
- Allahyarov was awarded the For the Liberation of Shusha Medal on 29 December 2020, by the decree of the President Aliyev.
