= Intigam Asgarli =

Azerbaijani military officer (1990–2020)

- Native name: İntiqam Bayram oğlu Əsgərli
- Born: Intigam Bayram oglu Asgarli; 16 August 1990; Masally District, Azerbaijan
- Died: 9 November 2020 (aged 30) Shusha District, Azerbaijan
- Allegiance: Azerbaijani Armed Forces
- Branch: Azerbaijani Special Forces
- Service years: 2014–2020
- Rank: Starshy praporshchik
- Conflicts: Second Nagorno-Karabakh War; Battle of Shusha
- Awards: Hero of the Patriotic War Medal

Intigam Bayram oglu Asgarli (Azerbaijani: İntiqam Bayram oğlu Əsgərli) was an Azerbaijani military officer.

== Early life and military service ==
Intigam Asgarli was born on 16 August 1990, in Vilash (or Kalinovka), Masally District of the Azerbaijan. He served as a soldier after he was educated in the village where he was born. After reading the warrant officer course, he continued to serve in the army as a warrant officer. He fought as a warrant officer of the Azerbaijani Army in the 2016 Nagorno-Karabakh Conflict. Intigam Asgarli took part in the 2020 Nagorno-Karabakh war, which started on 27 September. Participating in the Battle of Shusha (2020), he fought in the offensives in Shusha. Intigam Asgarli was shot on November 9, 2020, during a combat mission in Shusha between Armenian and Azerbaijani servicemen.

== Awards ==
- Asgarli was awarded the title of the Hero of the Patriotic War on 9 December 2020, by the decree of the President Aliyev.
- Asgarli was awarded the For Fatherland Medal for the second time on 15 December 2020, by the decree of the President Aliyev.
- Asgarli was awarded the For the Liberation of Shusha Medal on 29 December 2020, by the decree of the President Aliyev.
