= Gödəklər =

Gödəklər or Gëdaklar or Gyudaklyar or Kyudaklar may refer to:

- Gödəklər, Beylagan, Azerbaijan
- Gödəklər, Qubadli, Azerbaijan
