= Ramiz Jafarov =

Azerbaijani military officer (1974–2020)

- Native name: Ramiz Sübhan oğlu Cəfərov
- Born: Ramiz Subhan oglu Jafarov; December 10, 1974; Kiev, UkrainianSSR, Soviet Union
- Died: November 5, 2020 (aged 45) Shusha District, Azerbaijan
- Buried: Second Alley of Honor
- Allegiance: Azerbaijani Armed Forces
- Branch: Azerbaijani Special Forces
- Service years: 1992–2020
- Rank: Lieutenant colonel
- Conflicts: First Nagorno-Karabakh War; Four-Day War; Second Nagorno-Karabakh War †
- Awards: For Faultless Service Medal; Hero of the Patriotic War Medal

Ramiz Subhan oglu Jafarov (Azerbaijani: Ramiz Sübhan oğlu Cəfərov) was an Azerbaijani military officer, lieutenant colonel serving in the special forces Azerbaijani Armed Forces. He had taken part in the 2020 Nagorno-Karabagh War, in which he was killed. He had received the title of the Hero of the Patriotic War for his service during the war.

== Early life ==
Ramiz Subhan oglu Jafarov was born on 10 December 1974, in Kiev District of the Ukrainian SSR, which was then part of the Soviet Union. His origin from Masalli District of Azerbaijan.

In 1981-1989, he studied at the secondary school No. 11 in Sumgayit, and in 1989–1992 at the Jamshid Nakhchivanski Military Lyceum. In 1992-1996, he studied at the Ryazan Airborne High School.

== Military service ==
Ramiz Jafarov started his military career in 1992. He was a lieutenant colonel serving in the special forces of the Azerbaijani Armed Forces.

Ramiz Jafarov took part in the Nagorno-Karabakh war, 2016 Nagorno-Karabakh conflict and 2020 Nagorno-Karabakh war, which started on 27 September. He was killed on 5 November in the battles for Shusha.

== Personal life ==
Ramiz Jafarov was married, and had five children. He was fluent in five languages. His nickname was "Eagle".

== Awards ==
- "For Faultless Service" medal (First, second and third degree)
- Jafarov was awarded the 10th Anniversary of the Armed Forces of the Republic of Azerbaijan (1991–2001) Medal on 25 June 2001, by the decree of the President Heydar Aliyev.
- Aliyev was awarded the "90th Anniversary of the Armed Forces of Azerbaijan (1918–2008)" Medal on 25 June 2008, by the decree of the President of Azerbaijan, Ilham Aliyev.
- Jafarov was awarded the "95th Anniversary of the Armed Forces of Azerbaijan (1918–2013)" Medal on 25 June 2013, by the decree of the President Aliyev.
- Jafarov was awarded the "100th Anniversary of the Armed Forces of Azerbaijan (1918–2018)" Medal on 25 June 2018, by the decree of the President Aliyev.
- Jafarov was awarded the title of the Hero of the Patriotic War on 9 December 2020, by the decree of the President Aliyev.
- Jafarov was awarded the "For Fatherland" Medal on 15 December 2020, by the decree of the President Aliyev.
- Jafarov was awarded the For the Liberation of Jabrayil Medal on 29 December 2020, by the decree of the President Aliyev.
- Jafarov was awarded the For the Liberation of Shusha Medal on 29 December 2020, by the decree of the President Aliyev.

== See also ==
- Anar Aliyev
- Shikhamir Gaflanov
