= Babak Alakbarov =

Azerbaijani military officer

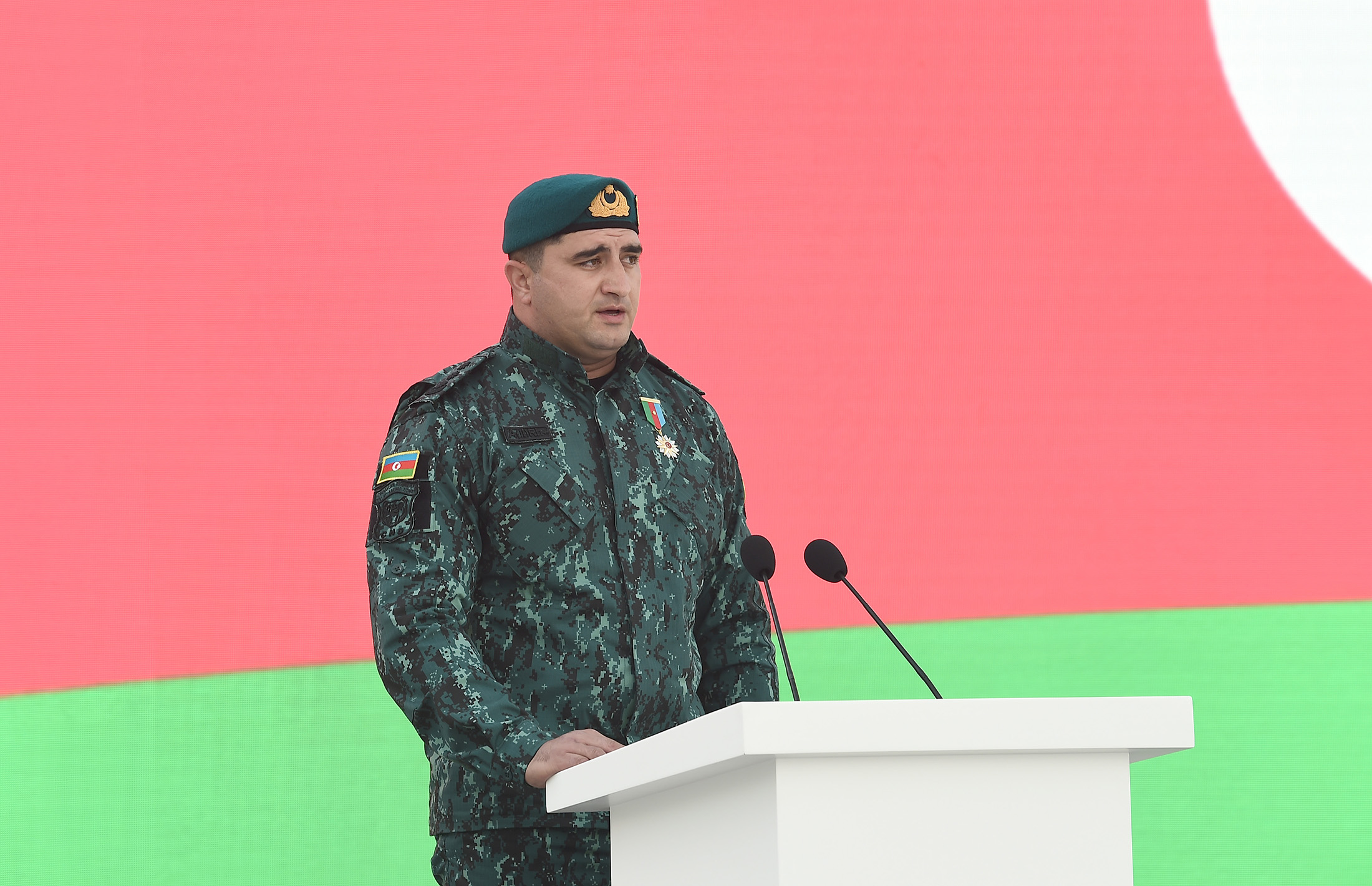
- Native name: Babək Mürsəl oğlu Ələkbərov
- Born: Babak Mursal oglu Alakbarov; December 24, 1987 (age 38); Absheron District, Azerbaijani SSR, Soviet Union
- Allegiance: Azerbaijani Armed Forces
- Branch: Azerbaijan State Border Service
- Rank: Colonel
- Conflicts: Second Nagorno-Karabakh War; Aras Valley campaign
- Awards: For Faultless Service Medal; Hero of the Patriotic War Medal

Babak Mursal oglu Alakbarov (Azerbaijani: Babək Mürsəl oğlu Ələkbərov) is a former Azerbaijani military officer, colonel serving in the Azerbaijan State Border Service . He had taken part in the 2020 Nagorno-Karabakh war. He had received the title of the Hero of the Patriotic War for his service during the war.

== Life ==
Babak Mursal oglu Alakbarov was born on 24 December 1987, in Absheron District of the Azerbaijan SSR, which was then part of the Soviet Union. His origin is from Spitak District. His mother's origin is from Kalinino.

== Military service ==
Babak Alakbarov took part in the 2020 Nagorno-Karabakh war, which started on 27 September. Alakbarov was especially active in the Aras Valley campaign during 2020 Nagorno-Karabakh war. He had reported to Ilham Aliyev on the liberation of Zangilan and Khudafarin Bridges from separatists.

== Awards ==
- Alakbarov was awarded the For Distinction in Military Service Medal, by the decree of the then President of Azerbaijan, Ilham Aliyev.
- Alakbarov was awarded the "90th Anniversary of the Armed Forces of Azerbaijan (1918–2008)" Medal by the decree of the President of Azerbaijan, Ilham Aliyev.
- Alakbarov was awarded the 95th Anniversary of the Armed Forces of Azerbaijan (1918–2013) Medal on 25 June 2013, by the decree of the President Aliyev.
- Alakbarov was awarded the 100th Anniversary of the Armed Forces of Azerbaijan (1918–2018) Medal on 25 June 2018, by the decree of the President Aliyev.
- Alakbarov was awarded the For Faultless Service Medal by the decree of the President Aliyev.
- Alakbarov was awarded the title of the For Heroism Medal on 16 August 2016, by the decree of the President Aliyev.
- Alakbarov was awarded the For Fatherland Medal by the decree of the President Aliyev.
- Alakbarov was awarded the title of the Hero of the Patriotic War on 9 December 2020, by the decree of the President Aliyev.
- Alakbarov was awarded the For the Liberation of Jabrayil Medal on 29 December 2020, by the decree of the President Aliyev.
- Alakbarov was awarded the For the Liberation of Zangilan Medal by the decree of the President Aliyev.

== See also ==
- Shikhamir Gaflanov
- Faig Gasimov
