= Anar Aliyev (soldier) =

Azerbaijani military officer (1980–2020)

- Native name: Anar Vaqif oğlu Əliyev
- Born: Anar Vagif oglu Aliyev; August 28, 1980; Boyagly, Kalbajar District, Azerbaijani SSR, Soviet Union
- Died: October 21, 2020 (aged 40) Khojavend District, Azerbaijan
- Buried: Second Alley of Honor
- Allegiance: Azerbaijani Armed Forces
- Branch: Azerbaijani Special Forces
- Service years: 1997–2020
- Rank: Lieutenant colonel
- Conflicts: Second Nagorno-Karabakh War; Aras Valley campaign; Battle of Hadrut
- Awards: For Faultless Service Medal; Hero of the Patriotic War Medal

Anar Vagif oglu Aliyev (Azerbaijani: Anar Vaqif oğlu Əliyev) was an Azerbaijani military officer, lieutenant colonel serving in the special forces of the Nakhchivan Garrison, which is part of the Azerbaijani Armed Forces. He had taken part in the 2020 Nagorno-Karabakh war, in which he was killed. He had received the title of the Hero of the Patriotic War for his service during the war.

== Early life ==
Anar Vagif oglu Aliyev was born on 28 August 1980, in Boyagly, Kalbajar District of the Azerbaijani SSR, which was then part of the Soviet Union. He and his family moved to Levonarkh in Mardakert District in 1981, which was part of the Nagorno-Karabakh Autonomous Oblast within the Azerbaijani SSR. Aliyev and his family fled to Bayimsarov in Tartar District in August 1988 and became refugees due to inter-ethnic violence in Nagorno-Karabakh.

== Military service ==
Anar Aliyev started his military career in 1997. He was a lieutenant colonel serving in the special forces of the Nakhchivan Garrison, which is part of the Azerbaijani Armed Forces. Aliyev went thorough military courses in Switzerland, Slovenia, Jordan, Romania, Hungary, the Czech Republic, Turkey and most recently in Pakistan.

Anar Aliyev took part in the 2020 Nagorno-Karabakh war, which started on 27 September. Participating in the Aras Valley campaign, he fought in the offensives in Jabrayil, Gubadly, and Zangilan. After the Azerbaijani forces seized control of the city of Zangilan, he made a video report to the President of Azerbaijan, Ilham Aliyev. He also took part in the Battle of Hadrut. Afterwards, on 21 October, moving towards Shusha, Aliyev, who was wounded in his eye, clashed with the Armenian troops at a height in Khojavend District. Aliyev was killed there, but his troops kept control of the height.

== Personal life ==
Anar Aliyev was married, and had two children. He was fluent in five languages.

== Awards ==
- For Distinction in Military Service Medal, by the decree of the then President of Azerbaijan, Heydar Aliyev.
- For Faultless Service Medal, by the decree of the President Aliyev.
- 10th Anniversary of the Armed Forces of the Republic of Azerbaijan (1991–2001) Medal on 25 June 2001, by the decree of the President Aliyev.
- 90th Anniversary of the Armed Forces of Azerbaijan (1918–2008) Medal on 25 June 2008, by the decree of the President of Azerbaijan, Ilham Aliyev.
- 95th Anniversary of the Armed Forces of Azerbaijan (1918–2013) Medal on 25 June 2013, by the decree of the President Aliyev.
- 100th Anniversary of the Armed Forces of Azerbaijan (1918–2018) Medal on 25 June 2018, by the decree of the President Aliyev.
- as a captain,For Fatherland Medal on 25 June 2011, by the decree of the President Aliyev.
- title of the Hero of the Patriotic War on 9 December 2020, by the decree of the President Aliyev.
- For Fatherland Medal for the second time on 15 December 2020, by the decree of the President Aliyev.
- For the Liberation of Shusha Medal on 29 December 2020, by the decree of the President Aliyev.

== See also ==
- Ramiz Jafarov
