= Samid Imanov =

Azerbaijani military officer (1981–2016)

- Samid İmanov
- Born: 1981; Sovetabad, Neftchala District, Azerbaijan SSR
- Died: April 2016 (aged 34–35) near Talysh village, Nagorno Karabakh
- Military career
- Allegiance: Azerbaijan
- Branch: Special Forces of Azerbaijan
- Service years: 2004–2016
- Rank: Major
- Conflicts: 2016 Armenian–Azerbaijani clashes
- Awards: National Hero of Azerbaijan; "Qızıl Ulduz" medalı; "Hərbi xidmətdə fərqlənməyə görə" II dərəcəli medalı; "Hərbi xidmətdə fərqlənməyə görə" III dərəcəli medalı; "Qüsursuz xidmətə görə" II dərəcəli medalı; "Qüsursuz xidmətə görə" III dərəcəli medalı; "Azərbaycan Silahlı Qüvvələrinin 90 illiyi" yubiley medalı; "Azərbaycan Silahlı Qüvvələrinin 95 illiyi" yubiley medalı]; "Qələbə günü münasibəti ilə baş tutan hərbi parada qatıldığı görə" medalı

Samid Imanov (Azerbaijani: Samid Gülağa oğlu İmanov, 1981 – 1/2 April 2016) was an Azerbaijani officer, major of Special Forces of Azerbaijan, National Hero of Azerbaijan.

== Biography ==
Samid Imanov was born in 1981 in Sovetabad (nowadays Hasanabad) settlement of Neftchala District of Azerbaijan SSR. In 1998 he graduated his district's school and entered the High Military School in Baku. Imanov graduated that school in 2003.

Since August 2004 Samid Imanov served in Special Forces of Azerbaijan. In 2007 Imanov took part in military exercises in Turkey. Also Samid Imanov participated in military courses in Pakistan, Romania and Switzerland.

For a period he was the head of security of Azerbaijani Defense Minister Zakir Hasanov. But soon due to his own wish he returned to Special Forces.

In August 2014 Samid Imanov with his troops took part in Armenian–Azerbaijani clashes. In 2016 he was a participant of the Azerbaijani general staff courses as a real candidate to generals. Imanov participated in the 2015 Moscow Victory Day Parade on Red Square commemorating the 70th anniversary of the victory over Nazi Germany, participating as part of a detached special forces contingent. After the parade, he was awarded a medal by the Ministry of Defence of Russia.

== Death ==
On the night from 1 to 2 April 2016 Armenian–Azerbaijani clashes took place along the line of contact in Nagorno-Karabakh and surrounding territories to the south. On 5 April, a mutual ceasefire agreement was reached. Major Samid Imanov died on the night from 3 to 4 April near Talysh village, which is a de jure part of Azerbaijan and de facto part of Nagorno-Karabakh Republic. He was wounded, but ordered his soldiers to help and take a very seriously wounded ensign away. When his soldiers returned for him they didn't find him. Imanov, not to get captured, reportedly left the field, but died of blood loss.

On 9 April Samid Imanov was buried at Martyrs' Lane in Hasanabad of Neftchala District. The Azerbaijani national flag covering the coffin was presented to his brother.

Samid Imanov had two children. He hadn't reportedly seen his second newborn baby.

On 19 April 2016 Azerbaijani President Ilham Aliyev signed orders on awarding honorary titles, orders and medals to a group of Azerbaijani military servicemen who "have distinguished exceptional bravery and heroism". Samid Imanov was awarded the medal of National Hero of Azerbaijan.
