= Shikhamir Gaflanov =

Azerbaijani military officer (1986–2020)

Shikhamir Gaflanov Azerbaijani: Şixamir Qaflanov
- Born: December 17, 1986; Zaqatala District, Azerbaijani SSR, Soviet Union
- Died: October 19, 2020 (aged 33); Khojavend District, Azerbaijan
- Burial place: Zaqatala District
- Military career
- Allegiance: Internal Troops of Azerbaijan
- Branch: Special Forces
- Service years: 2008–2020
- Rank: Major
- Conflicts: Second Nagorno-Karabakh War †
- Awards: For Faultless Service Medal; Hero of the Patriotic War Medal

Shikhamir Oruj oghlu Gaflanov (Azerbaijani: Şixamir Oruc oğlu Qaflanov) was an Azerbaijani military officer, major serving in the Internal Troops of Azerbaijan. He had taken part in the 2020 Nagorno-Karabakh war, in which he was killed. He had received the title of the Hero of the Patriotic War for his service during the war.

== Early life ==
Shikhamir Oruj oglu Gaflanov was born on 7 December 1986, in Zaqatala District of the Azerbaijan SSR, which was then part of the Soviet Union. Gaflanov was married, and had one child. His nickname was "Əfsanəvi Rembo" (Azerbaijani: Legandary Rembo).

== Military service ==
From 2008 to 2010 he studied at the Military School of the Internal Troops, graduating with the military rank of lieutenant. Gaflanov started his military career in 2010 as an officer. He was a major serving in the special forces of the Internal Troops of Azerbaijan.

Shikhamir Gaflanov fought for the freedom of Jabrayil, Hadrut, Fizuli, Zangilan, Gubadly and Khojavend on September 27 to October 19. Shikhamir Gaflanov was killed on October 19 during the Khojavend battle. He was buried in Zagatala region.

== Awards ==
- — "For Distinguished Service" Medal
- — "For Faultless Service" Medal
- — Gaflanov was awarded the "90th Anniversary of the Armed Forces of Azerbaijan (1918–2008)" Medal by the decree of the President of Azerbaijan, Ilham Aliyev.
- — Gaflanov was awarded the "95th Anniversary of the Armed Forces of Azerbaijan (1918–2013)" Medal by the decree of the President Aliyev.
- (09.12.2020) — Gaflanov was awarded the title of the Hero of the Patriotic War on 9 December 2020, by the decree of the President Aliyev.
- — Gaflanov was awarded the "For Fatherland" Medal on 15 December 2020, by the decree of the President Aliyev.

== See also ==
- Anar Aliyev
- Ramiz Jafarov
