= Zaur Javanshir =

Azerbaijani military officer

Hero of the Patriotic War Zaur Javanshir
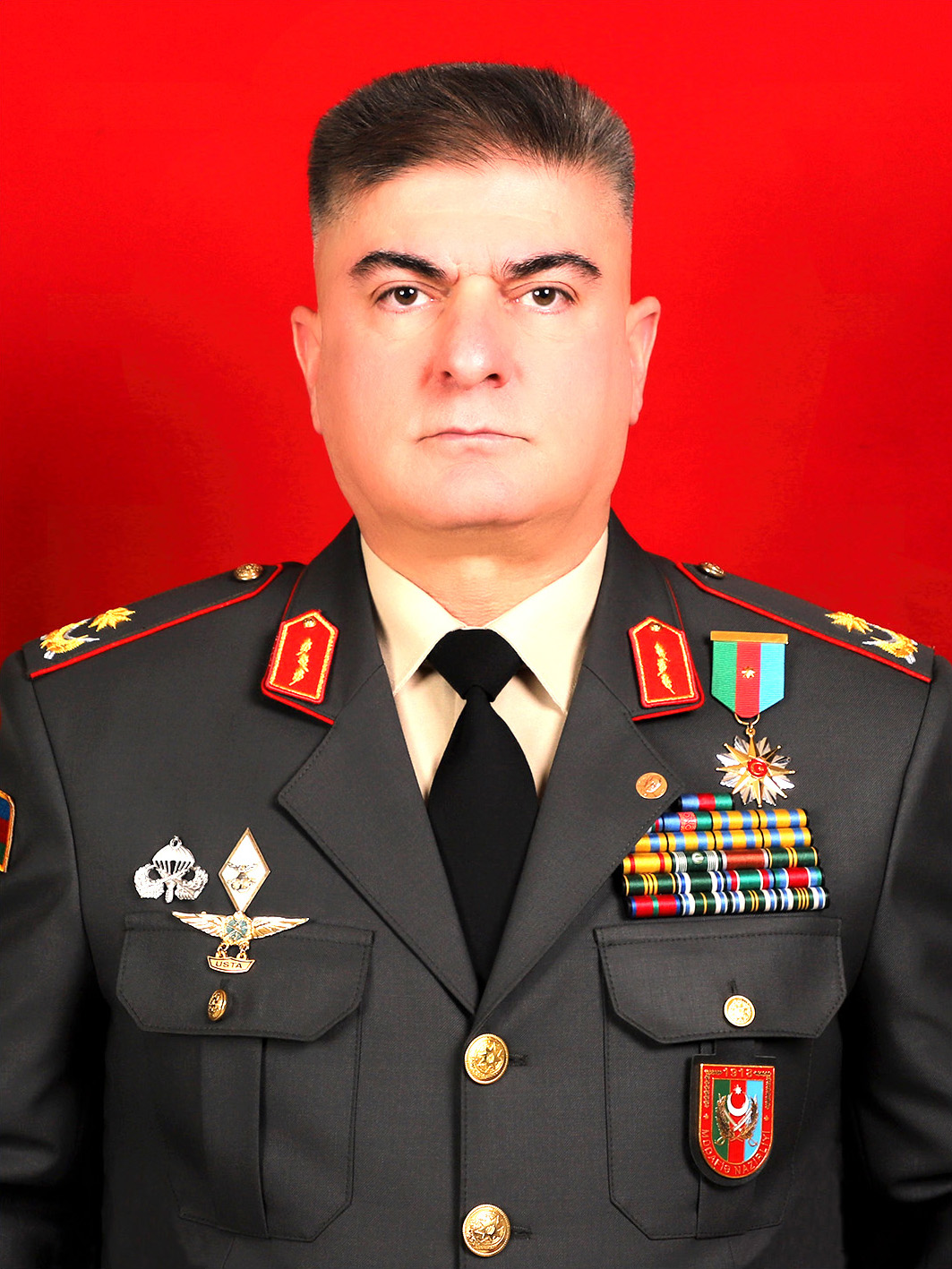
- Born: Zaur Mammadov; Hindarkh, Aghjabadi District, Azerbaijani SSR, Soviet Union
- Military career
- Allegiance: Azerbaijani Armed Forces
- Branch: Azerbaijani Special Forces
- Rank: Major general
- Conflicts: Four-Day War; Second Nagorno-Karabakh War; Battle of Shusha
- Awards: Hero of the Patriotic War; Azerbaijani Flag Order

Zaur Sabir oghlu Javanshir (Azerbaijani: Zaur Sabir oğlu Cavanşir) is an Azerbaijani military officer, major general serving in the special forces of the Azerbaijani Armed Forces. He had taken part in the 2016 Nagorno-Karabakh clashes and 2020 Nagorno-Karabakh war, and was one of the commanders of the Azerbaijani special forces during the Battle of Shusha, for which he had received the title of the Hero of the Patriotic War.

== Early life ==
Zaur Sabir oglu Javanshir was born in Hindarx of the Aghjabadi District in the Azerbaijani SSR, then Soviet Union. He is a descendant of Panah Ali Khan, the founder and first ruler of the Karabakh Khanate who built the Shusha fortress. Zaur Sabir oglu Javanshir (Mammadov) was born on September 21, 1974 in the village of Hindarkh, Agjabadi district. In 1991, Zaur Javanshir, who finished the Hindarkh village secondary school with a gold medal, entered the High Military Commanders’ School to continue the path of his ancestors and stand in guard for his country, people and flag.

In February 1993, as a cadet of the High Military Commanders’ School, he participated in the battle against the hated enemy in the direction of Kalbajar, Agdere, and commanded units in fierce battles. From January 1994 until May 12, 1994, with his fellow soldiers he participated in the battles in the direction of Terter.

From 1994 to July 2000, he served directly on the front line in the Terter district from the position of platoon commander to the position of battalion commander.

With the creation of the Special Forces (SDF) in July 2000, Captain Zaur Javanshir was appointed the head of the Special Forces School, and in February 2002, Zaur Javanshir, who already had the rank of major, was appointed as the chief of staff of the newly formed Special Forces regiment.

In July 2002, he entered the Military Academy of the Armed Forces and studied at the Military Academy of the Ground Forces of the Turkish Armed Forces until 2004, taking the first place in education. From August 2004 to May 2006, he served as the commander of the “Yashma” special-purpose regiment of the SDF and repeatedly participated in special operations behind the enemy. In 2005, for his bravery in special operations he was awarded the order “Flag of Azerbaijan” by the decree of the President of Azerbaijan, Ilham Aliyev.

In the rank of lieutenant colonel, Zaur Javanshir from May 2006 to May 2011 was the commander of motorized rifle brigades’ No. 702,181,706 in Fuzuli and Beylagan districts. From 2011 to November 2013, he served as the head of the weapons and shooting department at Heydar Aliyev Azerbaijan Higher Military School and played an exceptional role in the training of future officers.

== Middle years old ==
In November 2013, Colonel Zaur Javanshir was appointed as the deputy commander of the SDF; during the years 2013-2015 he repeatedly participated and headed special operations behind enemy lines. In September 2016, was dismissed from the army at his own request as a protest against the injustice done to him by the then Chief of General Staff of the Azerbaijan Army, Colonel-General Najmeddin Sadigov, due to his refusal to comply with the illegal demands.

== Genealogy ==
He was the first commandant of Shusha, founded by his great-grandfather, Panahali Khan Javanshir. Major-General Zaur Javanshir’s genealogy is linked to Muhammad Gasim Agha (?- 1843), the son of Ibrahimkhalil Khan (1763-1806) the son of Panahali Khan Javanshir (1747-1763), the founder of the Garabagh Khanate, from the daughter of Hungutlu Allahyar Bey. Muhammad Gasim Agha married Khadija Beyim, the daughter of his uncle Mehrali Bey Javanshir, and they had 4 sons from this marriage - Najafgulu Agha, Pasha Agha (born in 1820-?), Kerim Agha (1826-1907), Gasim Agha (1834-?) and 2 daughters - Jahan khanim and Bala khanim Javanshir were born.

At the end of the 19th century, Kerim Aga was forced to leave the city of Shusha and settled in Gubadly district of Yelizavetpol (Ganja) guberniya.

Nasib Kerim oglu Javanshir (1911-1996), who was his descendant (great grandson), lived in Baharly village of Kebirli mahal of Shusha uyezd. He married with his relative Khurshid Khanum, who is considered to be a great granddaughter of Qasim Bey Zakir, and they had a daughter named Mafiza from this marriage.

However, soon they divorced. During the difficult years of the Great Patriotic War, Nasib Kerim oglu was not taken to the front because he worked as a tractor driver. Nasib, working in Hindarkh village of Kebirli mahal, married for the second time, Sumaya khanim from this village and lived here. Sabir Mammadov, one of Nasib Kerim oglu’s 10 children, and his son Zaur Javanshir were born in Hindarkh.

== Military service ==
Zaur Javanshir currently serves in the special forces of the Azerbaijani Armed Forces. He had taken part in the 2016 Nagorno-Karabakh clashes. Participating in the 2020 Nagorno-Karabakh war, he commanded the Azerbaijani special forces during the Battle of Shusha. Javanshir was appointed the first commandant of Shusha, and marched with the Victory Flag, which is the flag that was hoisted in Shusha, in the 2020 Victory Parade in Baku.

== Awards ==
- Zaur Javanshir was awarded the Azerbaijani Flag Order on 24 June 2005, by the decree of the President of Azerbaijan, Ilham Aliyev.
- Zaur Javanshir was promoted to the rank of major general on 7 December 2020, by the decree of the President Aliyev.
- Zaur Javanshir was awarded the title of the Hero of the Patriotic War on 9 December 2020, by the decree of the President Aliyev.
- Jubilee medal "100 years of Heydar Aliyev (1923-2023)" (2 February 2024)
