= İyirmi Altı Bakı Komissarı =

- Location within Azerbaijan
- Coordinates: 39°18′43″N 49°12′34″E
- Country: Azerbaijan
- Rayon: Neftchala
- Time zone: UTC+4 (AZT)
  - Summer (DST): UTC+5 (AZT)

İyirmi Altı Bakı Komissarı (also 26 Bakı komissarı, 26 Baky Komissary) was a town in the Neftchala Rayon of Azerbaijan until 1993.

Settlement was united with urban-type settlement Həsənabad according to the resolution No. 611 of the Azerbaijan National Assembly on May 19, 1993 and was removed from the list of settlement of the district.
