= Anvar Afandiyev =

Azerbaijani military officer (born 1965)

- Ənvər Əfəndiyev

Commander of the Azerbaijani Land Forces
- In office 23 July 2021 – 12 January 2024
- President: Ilham Aliyev
- Preceded by: Position established
- Succeeded by: Hikmat Mirzayev

Personal details
- Born: 18 November 1965 (age 60) Qakh, Azerbaijani SSR, Soviet Union

Military service
- Allegiance: Azerbaijani Armed Forces
- Branch/service: Azerbaijani Land Forces
- Years of service: 1983-2024
- Rank: Lieutenant general
- Battles/wars: First Nagorno-Karabakh War; Second Nagorno-Karabakh War

Anvar Afandiyev (Azerbaijani: Ənvər Zəkəriyyə oğlu Əfəndiyev) is an Azerbaijani military officer, serving as the lieutenant general in the Azerbaijani Armed Forces. He was the Commander of the Azerbaijani Land Forces and a Deputy Minister of Defence of Azerbaijan. He had taken part in the 2020 Nagorno-Karabakh war.

== Early life ==
Anvar Afandiyev was born on 18 November 1965, in the village of Qaşqaçay, in the Qakh District of the Azerbaijan SSR, which was then part of the Soviet Union. Until 1983, he studied at Qaşqaçay Village Secondary School. In the same year, he entered the Baku Higher Combined Arms Command School.

== Military service ==
In 1987, after successfully completing his military education, he was appointed as a platoon commander in the Kyiv Military District within the Soviet Army. During this period, he went to Chernobyl for three months in 1988 to participate in the recovery efforts after Chernobyl disaster. From 1989 to 1992, he served as a division commander and battalion deputy chief of staff for Soviet troops stationed in the Mongolian People's Republic. He has been serving in the Azerbaijan Army since 1992 when the Republic of Azerbaijan restored its independence.

From the beginning of his service in the Azerbaijan Army, he directly participated in the First Nagorno-Karabakh War as a regimental commander in the Aghdam. He graduated from the War College in 1999, and the Turkish Military Academy in 2000. From 2005 to 2008, the deputy chief of the Training and Education Center of the Azerbaijan Armed Forces, and from 2013 to 2015, he served as a battalion commander at the Azerbaijan Higher Military School as well as the Chief of Staff of the Barda Corps. On the 25th anniversary of the modern armed forces in June 2016, he was awarded the military rank of major general. From 2015 to June 2020, he served as the head of the Department of Combat Training of the Ministry of Defense.

== Karabakh war and army commander ==
When the Second Nagorno-Karabakh War began, he participated in battles as the commander of the 6th (Reserve) Army Corps. By the decree of the President Ilham Aliyev on July 23, 2021, Major General Anvar Afandiyev was appointed as the first commander of the Ground Forces of the Azerbaijan Armed Forces. That November, he became a Lieutenant General. On 12 January 2024, Efendiyev was retired into the reserve.
