= Kanan Seyidov =

Azerbaijani military officer

Hero of the Patriotic War Kanan Seyidov
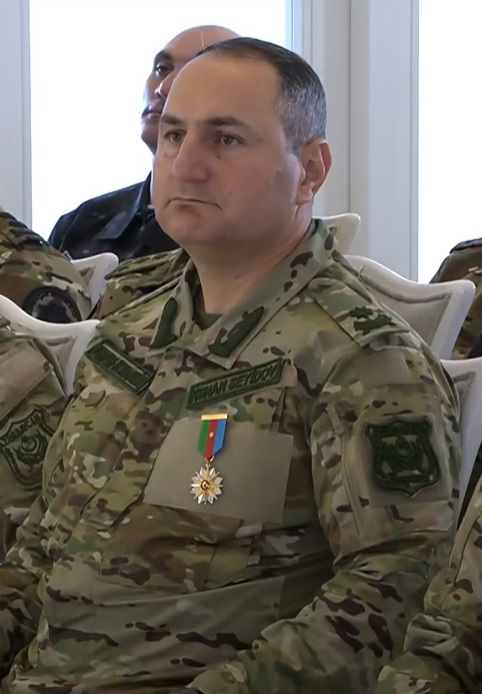
- Born: Bahramtepe, Imishli District, Azerbaijani SSR, Soviet Union
- Allegiance: Azerbaijani Armed Forces
- Branch: Azerbaijani Special Forces (deputy)
- Rank: Lieutenant general
- Commands: Special Forces
- Conflicts: Four-Day War; Second Nagorno-Karabakh War; Aras Valley campaign; Battle of Hadrut; Battle of Shusha
- Awards: Azerbaijani Flag Order; Hero of the Patriotic War; For the Fatherland Medal; For Heroism Medal; For the Liberation of Jabrayil Medal; For the Liberation of Fuzuli Medal; For the Liberation of Shusha Medal

Kanan Alihuseyn oghlu Seyidov (Azerbaijani: Kənan Əlihüseyn oğlu Seyidov) is an Azerbaijani military officer. He is a major general of the Azerbaijani Armed Forces and deputy commander of the Special Forces. As an officer of the Azerbaijani special forces, he participated in the 2016 Nagorno–Karabakh clashes and the 2020 Nagorno-Karabakh war, and was one of the Azerbaijani commanders during the 2020 battle of Shusha. He had received the title of the Hero of the Patriotic War.

== Early years ==
Kanan Alihuseyn oglu Seyidov was born in Bahramtapa, Imishli District of the then Azerbaijani SSR, Soviet Union.

== Military service ==
Seyidov currently serves as deputy commander of the Special Forces of the Azerbaijani Armed Forces, and is a major general. He took part in the 2016 Nagorno–Karabakh clashes. Seyidov also participated in the 2020 Nagorno-Karabakh war, commanding the Azerbaijani troops during the Aras Valley campaign, Battle of Hadrut, and Battle of Shusha.

== Awards ==
- Seyidov was awarded the Azerbaijani Flag Order in 2003, by the order of the then President of Azerbaijan, Heydar Aliyev.
- Seyidov was promoted to a lieutenant colonel in 2014, by the order of the President of Azerbaijan, Ilham Aliyev.
- Seyidov was awarded the For the Fatherland Medal in 2014, by the order of the President Aliyev in 2014.
- Seyidov was awarded the For Heroism Medal in 2016, by the order of the President Aliyev.
- Seyidov was promoted to a major general on 20 November 2020, by the order of the President Aliyev.
- Seyidov was awarded the title of the Hero of the Patriotic War on 9 December 2020, by the order of the President Aliyev.
- Seyidov was awarded the For the Liberation of Jabrayil Medal on 24 December 2020 by the decree of President Aliyev.
- Seyidov was awarded the For the Liberation of Fuzuli Medal on 25 December 2020 by the decree of President Aliyev.
- Seyidov was awarded the For the Liberation of Shusha Medal on 29 December 2020 by the decree of President Aliyev.
