= Ganit =

Ganit may refer to:

- Mathematics in Sanskrit
- Gallium nitrate
- Hənifə, Azerbaijan
