= Ramiz Gasimov =

Azerbaijani military officer (1975–2020)

Hero of the Patriotic War Ramiz Gasimov
- Native name: Ramiz Vaqif oğlu Qasımov
- Nickname: Iron Wing
- Born: Ramiz Vagif oglu Gasimov; February 17, 1975; Beylagan, Azerbaijani SSR, Soviet Union
- Died: October 22, 2020 (aged 45) Tartar District, Azerbaijan
- Buried: Second Alley of Honor
- Allegiance: Azerbaijani Armed Forces
- Branch: Azerbaijani Air Force
- Service years: 1995–2020
- Rank: Lieutenant colonel
- Conflicts: Four-Day War; Tovuz clashes; Second Nagorno-Karabakh War; Madagiz offensive (DOW)
- Awards: For Faultless Service Medal; Hero of the Patriotic War Medal

Ramiz Vagif oglu Gasimov (Azerbaijani: Ramiz Vaqif oğlu Qasımov; 17 February 1975 – 22 October 2020) was an Azerbaijani military officer, lieutenant colonel who served in the Air Forces of the Azerbaijani Armed Forces. He had participated in the Four-Day War, the July 2020 Armenian–Azerbaijani clashes, and Second Nagorno-Karabakh War. He was killed during the Second Nagorno-Karabakh War and posthumously received the title of the Hero of the Patriotic War.

== Early life ==
Ramiz Vagif oglu Gasimov was born on 17 February 1975, in the city of Beylagan of the Azerbaijani SSR, which was then part of the Soviet Union.

== Military service ==
Ramiz Gasimov served as a lieutenant colonel in the Air Forces of the Azerbaijani Armed Forces. He was able to pilot all types of helicopters and had the introduction of all types of weapons in Azerbaijan's arsenal. He was serving both as an instructor and a test pilot.

Gasimov had taken part in the Four-Day War in 2016, and the July 2020 clashes with Armenia in Tovuz District.

Gasimov also took part in the Second Nagorno-Karabakh War, which began on 27 September 2020, along the Nagorno-Karabakh Line of Contact. Gasimov, who piloted a Mil Mi-17 helicopter armed with Spike missiles, first took part in the Madagiz offensive, providing air support to the Azerbaijani ground forces. According to the Azerbaijani military officials, he destroyed many targets, including several 9K33 Osa anti-aircraft missile systems and P19 radio equipment, belonging to the Armenian forces. After attacking the Armenian positions, he came under heavy fire, and the Armenian forces shot down the helicopter he was piloting. Gasimov ordered the other crew members of the helicopter to catapult. Gasimov, who was severely wounded in the arm, directed the helicopter to an empty area to prevent it from crashing into one of the villages in Tartar District. Although he managed to parachute out of the helicopter, he received a heavy blow to his head.

The Azerbaijani troops found Gasimov, who had fainted, and removed him from the battlefield. He then was taken to hospital for medical treatment, but died on 22 October after 25 days in coma. He earned the nickname of Iron Wing for his activity in the war.

== Personal life ==
Ramiz Gasimov was married to Gunel Gasimova and the couple had three children.

== Awards ==
- Aliyev was awarded the title of the Hero of the Patriotic War on 9 December 2020, by the decree of the President of Azerbaijan, Ilham Aliyev.
- Aliyev was awarded the For Fatherland Medal on 15 December 2020, by the decree of the President Aliyev.
