= Cincartala =

Village in Azerbaijan

Coordinates: 41°40′N 46°21′E

Cincartala is a village in the municipality of Hənifə in the Balakan Rayon of Azerbaijan.
