= Hənifə =

- Municipality
- Location within Azerbaijan Location within Shaki-Zagatala Economic Region
- Coordinates: 41°42′41″N 46°23′32″E
- Country: Azerbaijan
- District: Balakan

Population
  - Total: 5,571
- Time zone: UTC+4 (AZT)
  - Summer (DST): UTC+5 (AZT)

Hənifə (Hanifa) is a village and municipality in the Balakan District of Azerbaijan. It has a population of 5,571. The municipality consists of the villages of Hənifə, Böyüktala, Məlikzadə, Cincartala, Gülüzənbinə, and Göyəmtala.

== Notable natives ==
- Ilham Mehdiyev - military officer, lieutenant general, the deputy head of the Azerbaijani State Border Service and Hero of the Patriotic War
