= Ilham Mehdiyev =

Azerbaijani military officer

Hero of the Patriotic War Ilham Mehdiyev
- Born: August 2, 1965 (age 60); Hanifa, Balakan District, Azerbaijani SSR, Soviet Union
- Allegiance: Azerbaijani State Border Service
- Service years: 1987–present
- Rank: Lieutenant general
- Conflicts: Second Nagorno-Karabakh War; Aras Valley campaign; Lachin offensive
- Awards: For service to the Fatherland Order; Azerbaijani Flag Order; Hero of the Patriotic War Medal

Ilham Ismayil oghlu Mehdiyev (Azerbaijani: İlham İsmayıl oğlu Mehdiyev; born 1965) is an Azerbaijani military officer, lieutenant general, and the deputy head of the Azerbaijani State Border Service (SBS). He was previously also the head of the Azerbaijani Coast Guard branch of the State Border Service (SBS). Mehdiyev commanded the Azerbaijani SBS during the 2020 Nagorno-Karabakh war and received the title of the Hero of the Patriotic War.

== Life and service ==
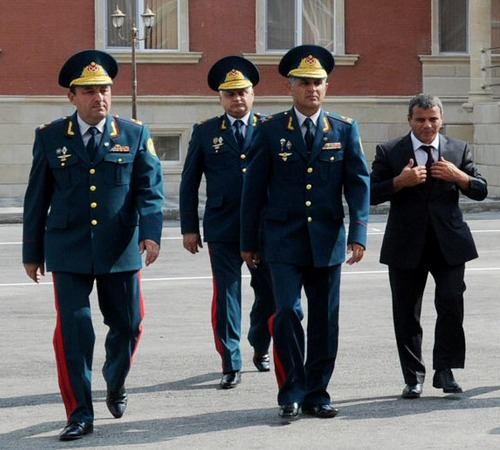
Ilham Mehdiyev (second from right) attending the opening of the garrison and residential complex of the new military unit of the State Border Service in the city of Yevlakh in 2012.

Ilham Ismayil oglu Mehdiyev was born on 2 August 1965, in the Hanifa village of the Balakan District in Azerbaijan SSR, then Soviet Union. He is married and has three children. He completed his military studies in the Odessa Artillery Commanders School in years 1983–1987.

Mehdiyev served in the Soviet army from 1987 to 1993 until Azerbaijan's independence when he began his military service in the ranks of the Azerbaijani Armed Forces in 1993. By 2006, he had become a major general, holding the position of deputy head of the Azerbaijani State Border Service (SBS), and the head of the Azerbaijani Coast Guard, belonging to the SBS.

Mehdiyev participated in the 2020 Nagorno-Karabakh war, commanding the Azerbaijani SBS during the offensive in the Aras Valley. His forces had pushed 100 kilometres (62 mi) deep into the frontline in ten days, and seized control of Jabrayil and Zangilan districts, as well as the Khodaafarin Bridges.

== Awards ==
- Mehdiyev was awarded the For Military Merit Medal on 16 August 2002, by the decree of then the President of Azerbaijan, Heydar Aliyev.
- Mehdiyev was awarded the For Fatherland Medal on 16 August 2007, by the decree of the President of Azerbaijan, Ilham Aliyev.
- Mehdiyev was awarded the For service to the Fatherland Order on 18 August 2008, by the decree of President Aliyev.
- Mehdiyev was awarded the Azerbaijani Flag Order on 14 August 2012, by the decree of President Aliyev.
- Mehdiyev was awarded the For Bravery Medal on 15 August 2014, by the decree of President Aliyev.
- Mehdiyev was promoted to a lieutenant general in August 2016.
- Mehdiyev was awarded the Order of Courage on 16 August 2019, by the decree of President Aliyev.
- Mehdiyev was awarded the honorary title of Hero of the Patriotic War, which is the highest title in Azerbaijan, on 9 December 2020, by the decree of President Aliyev.
- Mehdiyev was awarded the For the Liberation of Jabrayil Medal on 24 December 2020 by the decree of President Aliyev.
- Mehdiyev was awarded the For the Liberation of Zangilan Medal on 25 December 2020, by the decree of President Aliyev.
