= Məlikzadə =

Coordinates: 41°40′N 46°22′E

- Location within Azerbaijan Location within Shaki-Zagatala Economic Region
- Country: Azerbaijan
- Rayon: Balakan
- Time zone: UTC+4 (AZT)
  - Summer (DST): AZT

Məlikzadə is a village in the municipality of Hənifə in the Balakan Rayon of Azerbaijan.
