= Gülüzənbinə =

- Location within Azerbaijan Location within Shaki-Zagatala Economic Region
- Coordinates: 41°38′58″N 46°20′26″E
- Country: Azerbaijan
- Rayon: Balakan
- Municipality: Hənifə
- Time zone: UTC+4 (AZT)
  - Summer (DST): UTC+5 (AZT)

Gülüzənbinə (also, Guluzan-Bina, Gyuluzanbina, Gyulyuzambina, and Gyulyuzanbina) is a village in the Balakan Rayon of Azerbaijan. The village forms part of the municipality of Hənifə.
