= Böyüktala =

- Location within Azerbaijan
- Coordinates: 41°41′7″N 46°21′34″E
- Country: Azerbaijan
- Rayon: Balakan
- Municipality: Hənifə
- Time zone: UTC+4 (AZT)
  - Summer (DST): UTC+5 (AZT)

Böyüktala is a village in the municipality of Hənifə in the Balakan Rayon of Azerbaijan.
