= Göyəmtala =

Human settlement in Azerbaijan

Coordinates: 41°37′N 46°20′E

Göyəmtala is a former village in the municipality of Hənifə in the Balakan Rayon of Azerbaijan.
