= Commander of the Land Forces (Azerbaijan) =

Commander of the Land Force
- Azərbaycan Silahlı Qüvvələri Quru Qoşunları Komandanı (Azerbaijani)
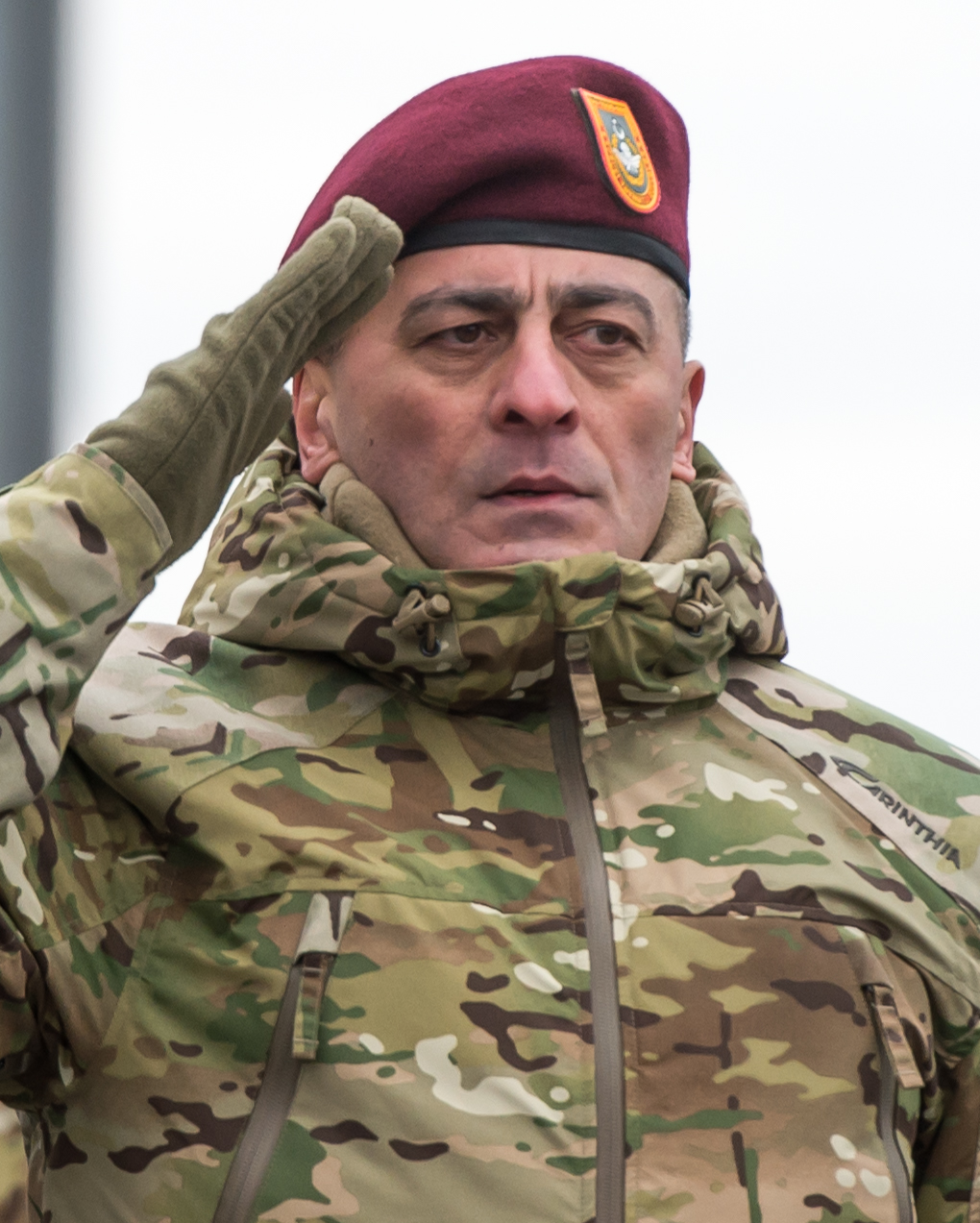
- Incumbent; Hikmat Mirzayev since 12 January 2024
- Ministry of Defence
- Member of: General Staff of Azerbaijani Armed Forces
- Reports to: Chief of the General Staff
- Formation: 23 July 2021
- First holder: Anvar Afandiyev
- Deputy: Deputy commander

The Commander of the Azerbaijani Land Forces (Azerbaijani: Azərbaycan Silahlı Qüvvələri Quru Qoşunları Komandanı) is the administrative head in the Azerbaijani Land Forces, and is under the Chief of the General Staff and the Minister of Defence. The current Commander of the Land Forces is Colonel General Hikmat Mirzayev.

== List of commanders ==
No.	Portrait	Officeholder	Took office	Left office	Time in office	Ref.
1	Anvar Afandiyev	Lieutenant General; Anvar Afandiyev (born 1965)	23 July 2021	11 January 2024	2 years, 172 days	
2	Hikmat Mirzayev	Colonel General; Hikmat Mirzayev (born 1968)	11 January 2024	Incumbent	2 years, 239 days	
