= Qayalı, Barda =

Settlement in Barda District, Azerbaijan

Qayalı is a village and municipality in the Barda Rayon of Azerbaijan. It has a population of 333.
