= Miquel Faig =

- Born: Spain
- Education: Stanford University PhD 1986
- Known for: Monetary Theory, Macroeconomics, and Finance
- Scientific career
- Fields: Economics
- Workplaces: University of Toronto Mississauga
- Doctoral advisor: Robert Hall (economist)

Miquel Faig i Aumallé is a professor of economics at the University of Toronto Mississauga. He completed his undergraduate studies at the University of Barcelona in 1979 and his PhD at Stanford University in 1986. He started his teaching career at the University of Toronto Mississauga upon completion of his doctoral studies. He was promoted to associate professor in 1992 and full professor in 2002. His research interests include Monetary Theory, Macroeconomics and Finance.

== Selected articles ==
Faig, M. "Characterization of the Optimal Tax on Money when it Functions as a Medium of Exchange," Journal of Monetary Economics 22, July 1988: 137–148.
Faig, M. "Seasonal Fluctuations and the Demand for Money," Quarterly Journal of Economics 93, November 1989: 847–861.
Faig, M. and P. Shum, "Portfolio Choice in the Presence of Personal Illiquid Projects," Journal of Finance 57(1), February 2002: 303–328.
Faig, M., and B. Jerez, "A Theory of Commerce," Journal of Economic Theory, 122 (1), May 2005 : 60–99.
Faig, M., and X. Huangfu, "Competitive Search Equilibrium in Monetary Economies." Journal of Economic Theory 136 (1), September 2007: 709–718.
Faig, M, "Endogenous Buyer-Seller Choice and Divisible Money in Search Equilibrium." Journal of Economic Theory 141(1), July 2008: 184–199.

== Books ==
As part of a collection of socio-economic studies of the "comarques" of Catalonia, the Caixa d' Estalvis the Catalunya published in 1983 the Catalan book La Garrotxa: Medi Natural, Estructura Económica i Equipaments Socials, written by Margarida Castanyer and Miquel Faig.
