= Hikmat Mirzayev =

Azerbaijani military officer

Hero of the Patriotic War Hikmat Mirzayev
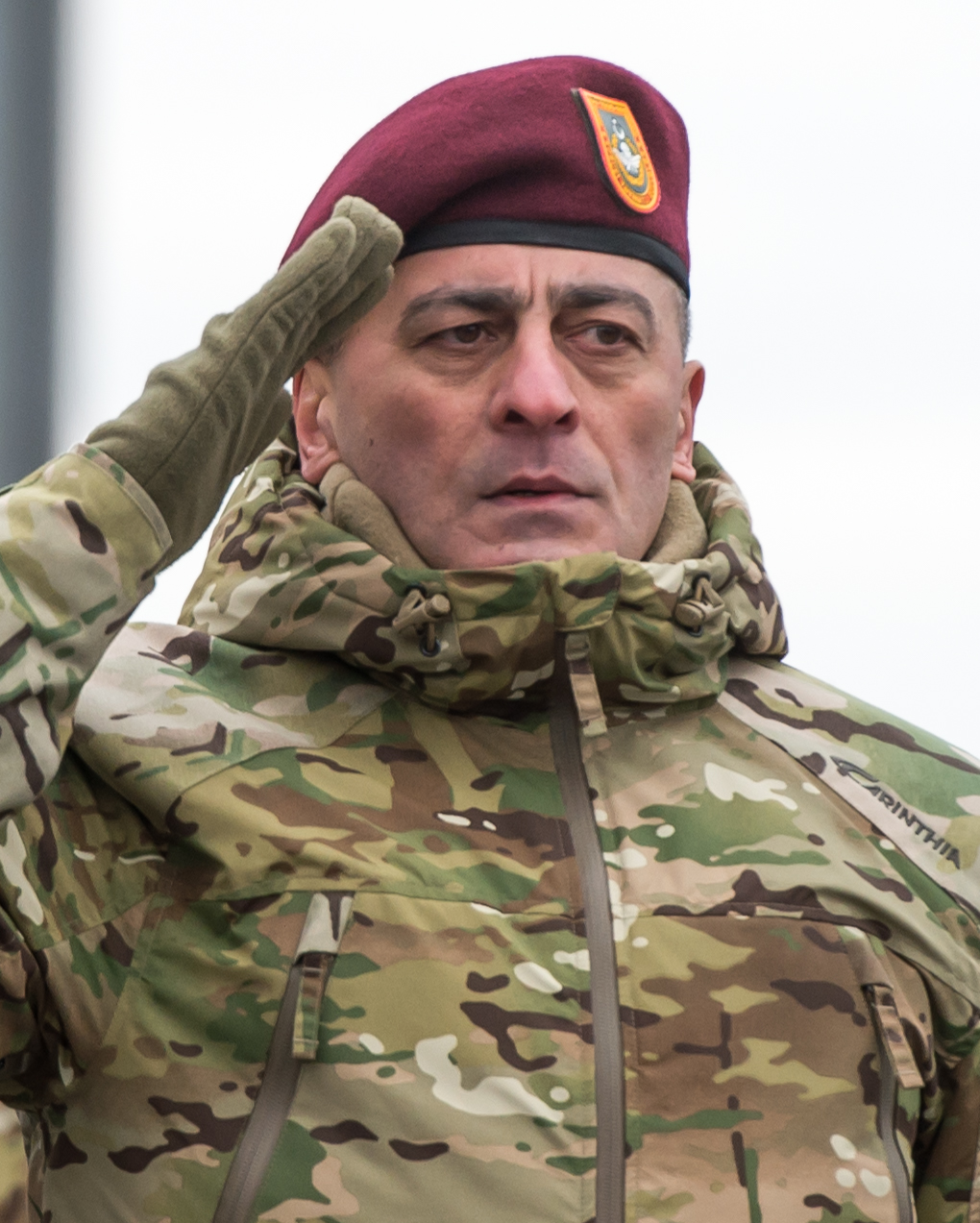
- Mirzayev at the Baku Victory Parade of 2020

Deputy Minister of Defense
- Incumbent
- Assumed office 11 January 2024
- Minister: Zakir Hasanov

Personal details
- Born: 29 February 1968 (age 58) Bilasuvar, Azerbaijani SSR, Soviet Union
- Awards: Karabakh Order; Azerbaijani Flag Order; For service to the Fatherland Order
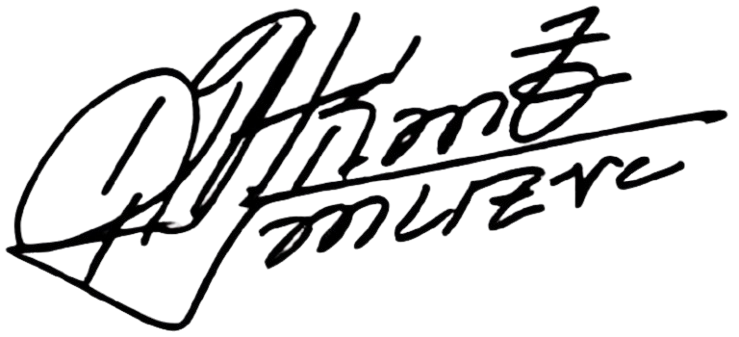
- Signature
- Nickname: The Conqueror of Shusha (Şuşa Fatehi)

Military service
- Allegiance: Azerbaijani Armed Forces
- Rank: Colonel general
- Commands: Azerbaijani Land Forces
- Battles/wars: Four-Day War; Second Nagorno-Karabakh War; Aras Valley campaign; Battle of Hadrut; Battle of Shusha

Hikmat Izzat oghlu Mirzayev (Azerbaijani: Hikmət İzzət oğlu Mirzəyev; born 29 February 1968) is an Azerbaijani military officer who serves as Deputy Minister of Defense and commander of the Azerbaijani Land Forces since 2024. He is a colonel general of the Azerbaijani Armed Forces and the former commander of the Special Forces from 2014 to 2024, and participated in the 2016 Nagorno–Karabakh clashes and the Second Nagorno-Karabakh War, during which he led Azerbaijani forces in the 2020 battle of Shusha. He received the title of the Hero of the Patriotic War.

== Life and service ==
Hikmat Mirzayev was born on February 29, 1968, in Bilasuvar. On 19 January 2002, by the decree of the President Heydar Aliyev, Mirzayev was awarded the rank of lieutenant colonel. On 29 April 2015, as the commander of the Special Forces, Major General Mirzayev, took part in the ceremony of presenting battle flags to the newly created military units of the Azerbaijani Special Forces. He led the Azerbaijani Special Forces during the April 2016 clashes in Nagorno–Karabakh.

On 4 October 2020, President Ilham Aliyev, in his position as Supreme Commander-in-Chief of the Armed Forces of Azerbaijan, congratulated Mirzayev, as well as Major General Mais Barkhudarov, and the personnel they led on the capture of the city of Jabrayil and nine villages of Jabrayil District. On 17 October, by decree of President Aliyev, Mirzayev was awarded the rank of lieutenant general On 8 November, Aliyev congrulated him on capture of Shusha. On 10 December, Mirzayev led the servicemen of the Special Forces of the Ministry of Defense who marched in the Baku Victory Parade.

On January 11, 2024, Hikmat Mirzayev was appointed as the Deputy Minister of Defense and commander of the Azerbaijani Land Forces.

== Personal life ==
He is married. He has two children.

== Awards ==
- On 24 June 2003, Mirzayev was awarded the For Heroism Medal by the decree of President Heydar Aliyev No. 887 for "special merits in protecting the independence and territorial integrity of the Republic of Azerbaijan, for the distinction in the performance of his official duties and the tasks assigned to the military unit."
- On 24 June 2015, Mirzayev was awarded the For service to the Fatherland Order.
- On 17 October 2020, Mirzayev was promoted to the military rank of lieutenant general by Ilham Aliyev.
- On 9 December 2020, Mirzayev was awarded the Hero of the Patriotic War Medal by the decree of the President Aliyev.
- On 7 November 2024, Mirzayev was promoted to the military rank of colonel general.
