= Qayalı, Jalilabad =

Qayalı
- Location within Azerbaijan
- Coordinates: 39°13′47″N 48°13′42″E
- Country: Azerbaijan
- Rayon: Jalilabad
- Time zone: UTC+4 (AZT)
  - Summer (DST): UTC+5 (AZT)

Qayalı (also, Kayaly) is a village in the Jalilabad Rayon of Azerbaijan.
