= Gödəklər, Beylagan =

Gödəklər
- Municipality
- Location within Azerbaijan
- Coordinates: 39°45′29″N 47°50′59″E
- Country: Azerbaijan
- Rayon: Beylagan

Population
  - Total: 517
- Time zone: UTC+4 (AZT)
  - Summer (DST): UTC+5 (AZT)

Gödəklər (also, Gëdaklar and Kyudaklar) is a village and municipality in the Beylagan Rayon of Azerbaijan. It has a population of 517.
