= Faig Mammadov =

Azerbaijani agriculturist

- Faiq İsmayıl oğlu Məmmədov
- Born: Faig Ismail oglu Mammadov; November 27, 1929; Kirovabad, Azerbaijan SSR, Transcaucasian SFSR, USSR
- Died: August 4, 1987 (aged 60); Kirovabad, Azerbaijan SSR, USSR
- Education: Azerbaijan State Agricultural University; Moscow Timiryazev Agricultural Academy
- Occupation: Agronomist

Faig Ismail oglu Mammadov (Azerbaijani: Faiq İsmayıl oğlu Məmmədov, pronounced [fɑˈiɡ ismɑˈjɯl oɣˈlu mæˈmædov]; November 27, 1929 – August 4, 1987) was an Azerbaijani agronomist specializing in cottonseed. He taught agricultural sciences at Azerbaijan State Agricultural University and worked in the State Land Commissariat.

== Early life and education ==
Faig Ismail oglu Mammadov was born in Kirovabad, Azerbaijan Soviet Socialist Republic on November 27, 1929. After finishing secondary school, he studied fruit and vegetable growing and viticulture at Azerbaijan State Agricultural University (ASAU), where he graduated with honours in 1951. He continued onto his Master's course at ASAU and wrote his dissertation under N. I. Malov. He finished in 1954 and was awarded a degree of Candidate of Agricultural Sciences by the Supreme Attestation Commission under the USSR Ministry of Higher Education in 1957. He was a doctoral candidate at Moscow Timiryazev Agricultural Academy in 1964-1966. He was awarded a doctorate in agricultural studies by the Supreme Attestation Commission's Cabinet of Ministers in 1974. The title of his doctoral thesis was "Scientific basis of the system of centralized preparation of cotton seed for planting."

== Career ==
Mammadov began working at ASAU in 1955. In 1959, he was invited to work as the head of the department of selection and seed production in the State Land Commissariat. He became the department's head of personnel training in 1960. In 1962, the Ministry of Higher and Secondary Vocational Education named him an assistant professor. At ASAU, he headed the department of general agriculture between 1972-1973 and 1982-1986; was the dean of faculty from 1973 to 1980; and was pro-rector for postal tuition from 1986 to 1987. Mammadov was elected secretary of ASAU's party committee and was in 1969 elected as a member of the Ganja City Council. He was the scientific secretary of the scientific council on doctoral dissertation defense of Lenin All-Union Academy of Agricultural Sciences from 1980 until his death.

Mammadov's scientific research was mainly connected with cottonseed farming, the methods of preparing seed for sowing, and the study of sowing systems. He was the author of many fundamental and applied works, textbooks, and books, and authored about 50 articles regarding cotton seed farming. His education programs on general agriculture continue to be used at universities today. Along with his former advisor N. I. Malov, Mammadov was one of the main authors on a large-scale, comprehensive study on centralized delinting, sorting, calibrating, and processing cottonseed. He became the first Azerbaijani professor in agriculture.

Mammadov died at the age of 58 on August 4, 1987, in Ganja.

== Honours and awards ==
- 1957: Medal for participation in the All-Union Exhibition of Agriculture
- 1969: Certificate of Appreciation from the Zvanie Society of Azerbaijan SSR
- 1970: Certificate of Honour from the Editorial Board of Ekonomicheskaya gazeta
- 1973: Socialist Competition Winner award
- 1974: Certificate of Honour from the Leninist Community Youth Organization's Azerbaijan Central Committee
- 1980: Honoured Agronomist of Azerbaijan SSR - for his contributions to the preparation of highly qualified specialists, to the development of agriculture in accordance with the decree of the Supreme Soviet of the Azerbaijan Soviet Socialist Republic.
- 1987 (posthumous): Silver Medal from the National Economy's All-Union Exhibition of Achievements

== Legacy ==
In 1996, to celebrate Mammadov's 70th birthday, ASAU named its agriculture department in his honour and established a scholarship for students with high academic performance and who are active in public affairs in his name. A laboratory within the plant breeding and plant protection department was named for Mammadov at a later date. In 2005, Eldar Azizov, the head of Gaja Executive Power, approved the renaming of a street in Mammadov's honour.

== Selected publications ==
- 1952: Malov, N.I., et al. "Investigation of assorting and sowing of bare cotton seed." Scientific Report.
- 1957: "The study of efficiency on some methods of preparation of cotton seed for sowing." Proceeding Azerbaijan State Agricultural University, T. 4.
- 1965: Malov, N.I. et al. "Agrotechnical bases of assortment and calibration of cotton seed." Proceeding Azerbaijan State Agricultural University, No. 5.
- 1968: Malov, N.I. "The most important element in cotton production techniques." Printing House of Azerbaijan State Agricultural University.
- 1977: Huseynov, I.N. "Agriculture: Methodical guidelines. Printing House of Azerbaijan State Agricultural University.
- 1984: "Living conditions of agricultural plants and ways to settle them in agriculture (teaching aid)." Kirovabad City.
- 1987: "Recommendations on stripping, sorting, calibration and precision drilling of cotton seed." State Agriculture Committee of Azerbaijan SSR, Department of Polygraphy.
