= Gödəklər, Qubadli =

Gödəklər
- Location within Azerbaijan
- Coordinates: 39°19′45″N 46°36′05″E
- Country: Azerbaijan
- Rayon: Qubadli
- Time zone: UTC+4 (AZT)
  - Summer (DST): UTC+5 (AZT)

Gödəklər (also, Gëdaklar and Gyudaklyar) is a village in the Qubadli Rayon of Azerbaijan.
