= Həsənabad =

- Municipality
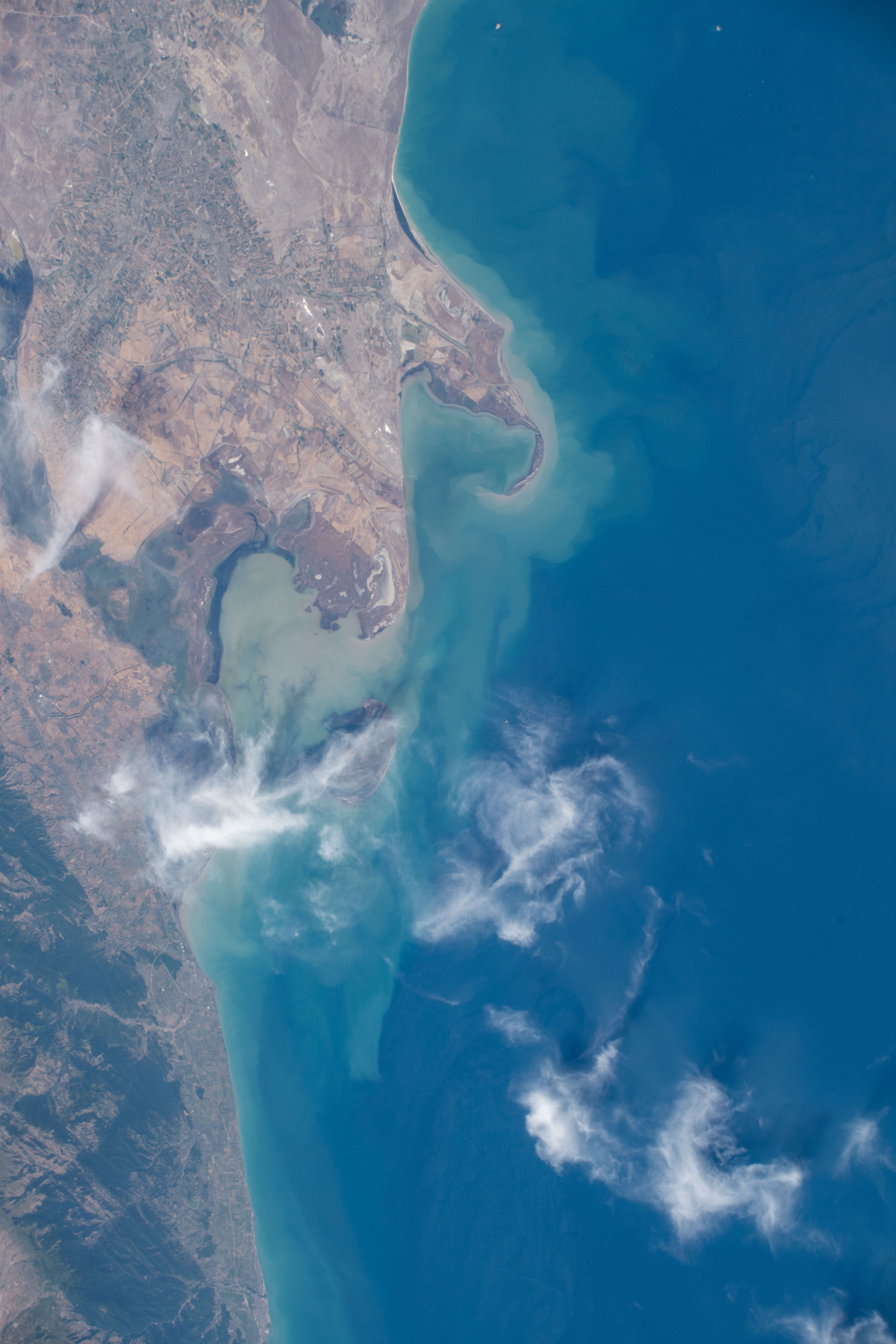
- Hasanabad from space

- Location within Azerbaijan
- Coordinates: 39°19′17″N 49°12′33″E
- Country: Azerbaijan
- Rayon: Neftchala

Population
  - Total: 6,915
- Time zone: UTC+4 (AZT)
  - Summer (DST): UTC+5 (AZT)

Həsənabad (also, Sovetabad) is a village and municipality in the Neftchala Rayon of Azerbaijan. It has a population of 6,915.
