= Qubadli =

City in Qubadli District, Azerbaijan

Qubadli Qubadlı
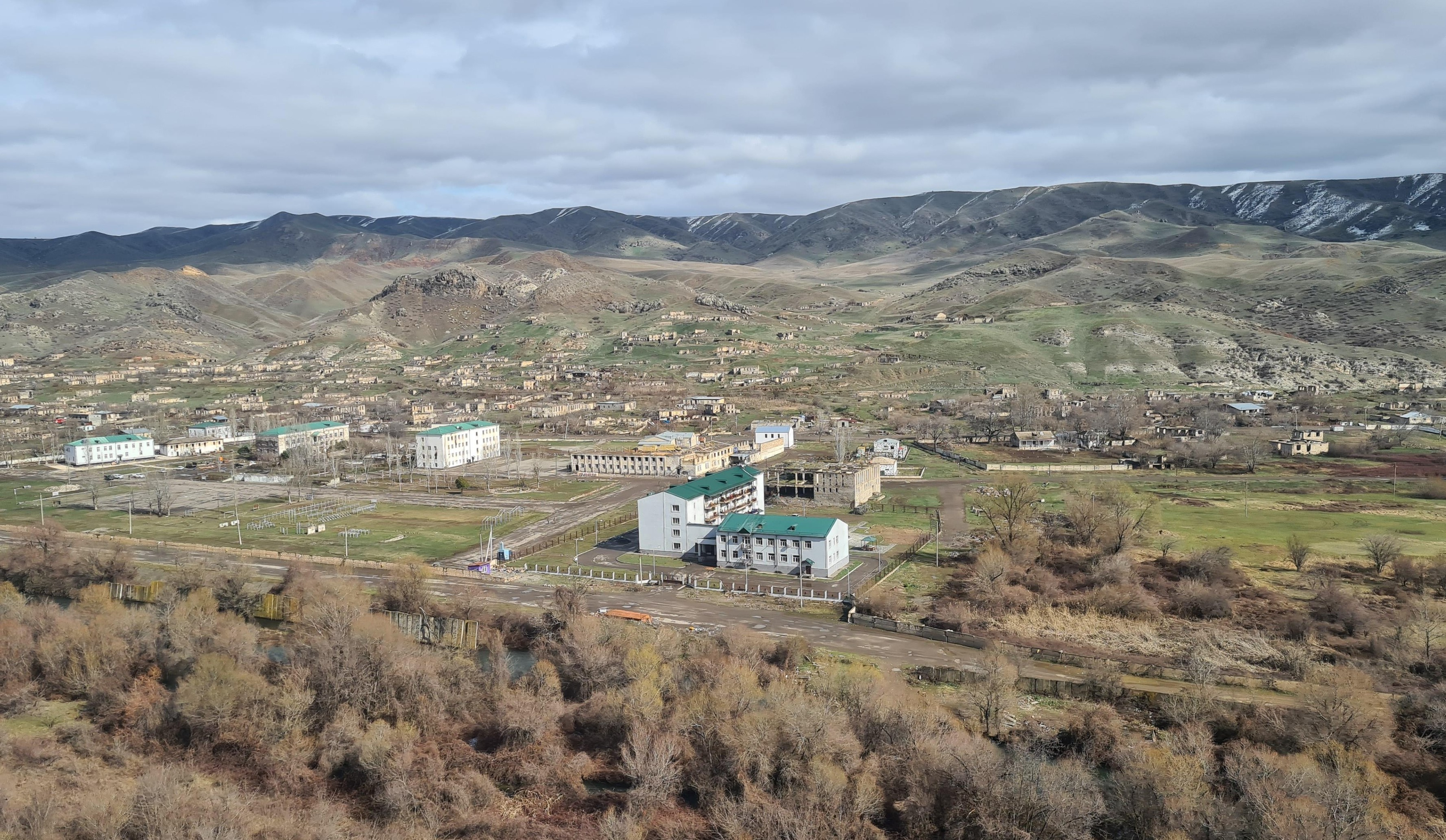

- Location within Azerbaijan Location within East Zangezur Economic Region
- Coordinates: 39°20′38″N 46°34′47″E
- Country: Azerbaijan
- District: Qubadli
- Elevation: 477 m (1,565 ft)

Population (2015)
  - Total: 600
- Time zone: UTC+4 (AZT)
- Area code: +994 133

Qubadli (Note: Also anglicized as Gubadly or Gubadli) (Azerbaijani: Qubadlı, pronounced [gubɑdˈlɯ]) is a city in Azerbaijan and the administrative centre of the Qubadli District. It is situated along the Vorotan (Bargushad) river.

== History ==
Qubadli was part of the Zangezur uezd of the Elizavetpol Governorate during the Russian Empire. According to 1886 census data, there were 70 homes and 326 Azerbaijanis (classified as "Tatars" in the census) of the Shiite branch of Islam in Qubadli. According to the 1912 publication of the Caucasian Calendar, the village of Qubadli was home to 672 people, the majority of whom were Azerbaijanis (classified as "Tatars" in the census).

During the Soviet era, Qubadli was first a part of Azerbaijan SSR's Zangilan District, then the administrative centre of the Qubadli District, and from 1923 to 1930, it was also briefly a part of its Kurdistansky Uyezd. During the early Soviet period in 1933, Qubadli was part of the village council of the same name in the Zangilan District. There were 88 farms in the village and a population of 346 people. The population of the village council, which included the villages of Gödəklər, Mahmudlu, and Qayalı, was 97.1 percent Azerbaijani.

Qubadli was granted urban-type settlement status in 1962 and city status on 24 July 1990. It housed an asphalt plant, a poultry factory, a stone quarry, three schools, two public libraries, a cultural centre, a movie theatre, and a hospital. The city had a population of 5,508 people, according to the Soviet Census of 1989.

During the First Nagorno-Karabakh War on 31 August 1993, Armenian forces occupied the village, forcing the Azerbaijani population to flee. It was later incorporated into the breakaway Republic of Artsakh as part of its Kashatagh Province, where it was known as Kashunik (Armenian: Քաշունիք), Sanasar (Սանասար), and Vorotan (Որոտան). Azerbaijan recaptured the city on 25 October 2020, during the 2020 Nagorno-Karabakh War.

== Demographics ==
Year	Population	Ethnic composition	Source
1886	326	100% Tatars (i.e. Azerbaijanis)	Transcaucasian Statistical Committee
1912	672	Mainly Tatars	Caucasian Calendar
1939	1,017	84.2% Azerbaijanis, 8.3% Russians, 5.9% Armenians	Soviet Census
1970	2,669	99.1% Azerbaijanis, 0.4% Russians, 0.4% Armenians	Soviet Census
1979	3,392	99.3% Azerbaijanis, 0.2% Russians, 0.1% Armenians	Soviet Census
1989	5,508		Soviet Census
1991	~5,800		Great Encyclopedic Dictionary
31 August 1993: Occupation of Qubadli. Expulsion of Azerbaijani population
2015	600	~100% Armenians	NKR estimate

== Notable natives ==
- Chingiz Ildyrym — People's Commissar for Military and Naval Affairs of the Azerbaijan SSR (1920).
- Vasili Aliyev — National Hero of Azerbaijan
- Niyamaddin Pashayev — Taekwando, World and European Champion
- Heydar Mammadaliyev — Wrestling, World Champion, 2004 Olympic silver medalist
- Shukur Hamidov — National Hero of Azerbaijan
- Aliyar Aliyev — National Hero of Azerbaijan
- Mais Barkhudarov — Azerbaijani officer, major general of Armed Forces of Azerbaijan

== Gallery ==
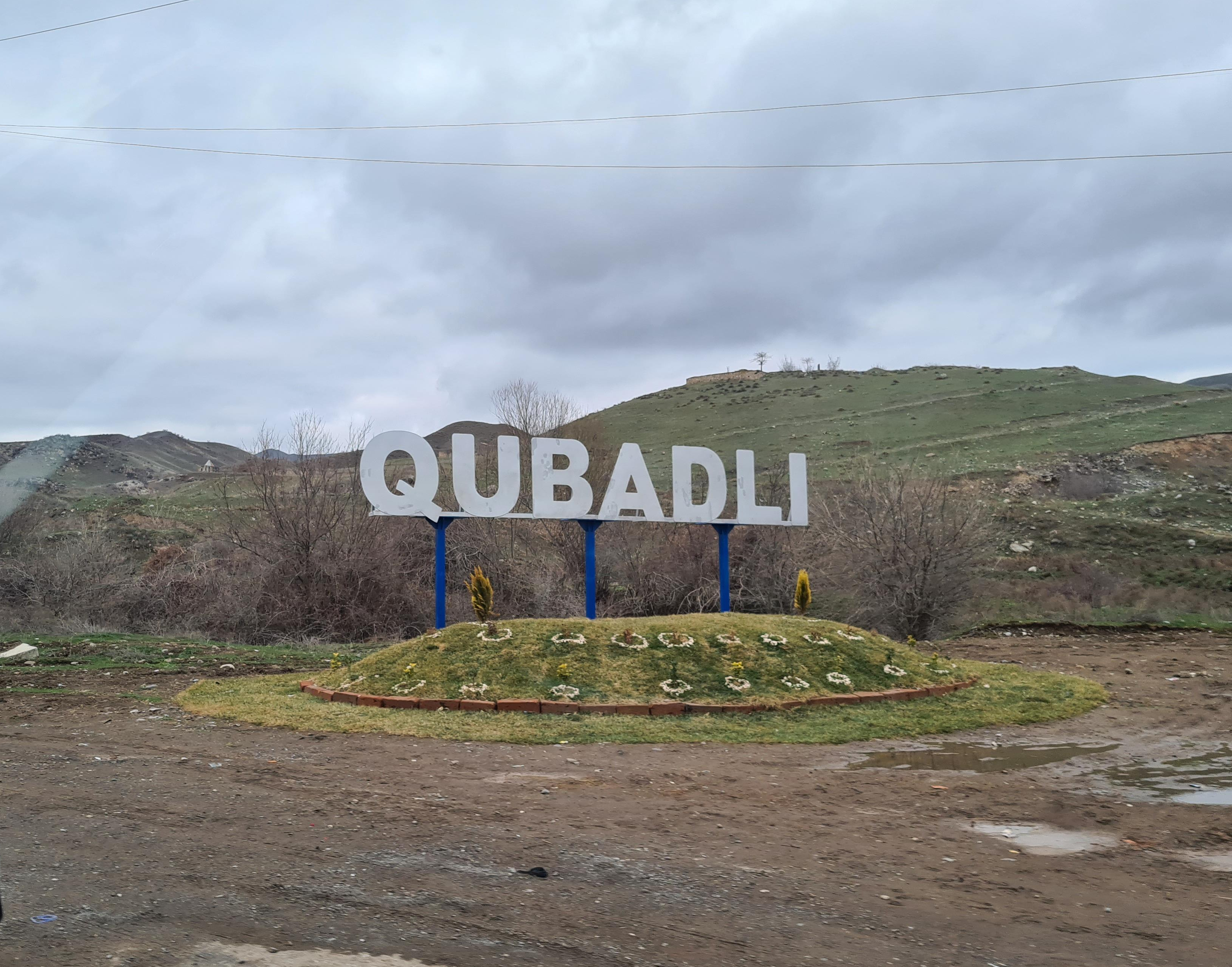
Sign at the entrance of the city

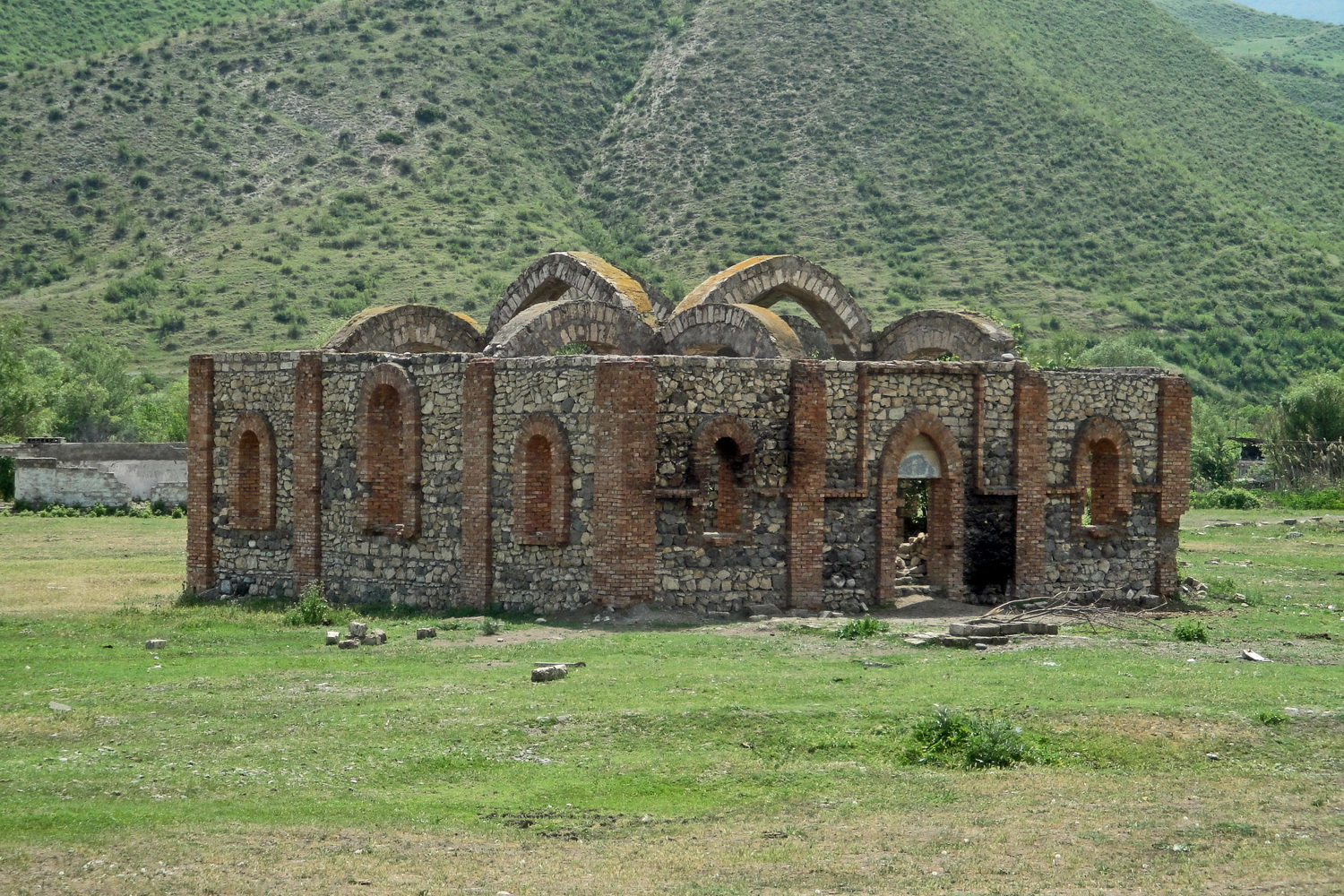
Ruined building in Qubadli

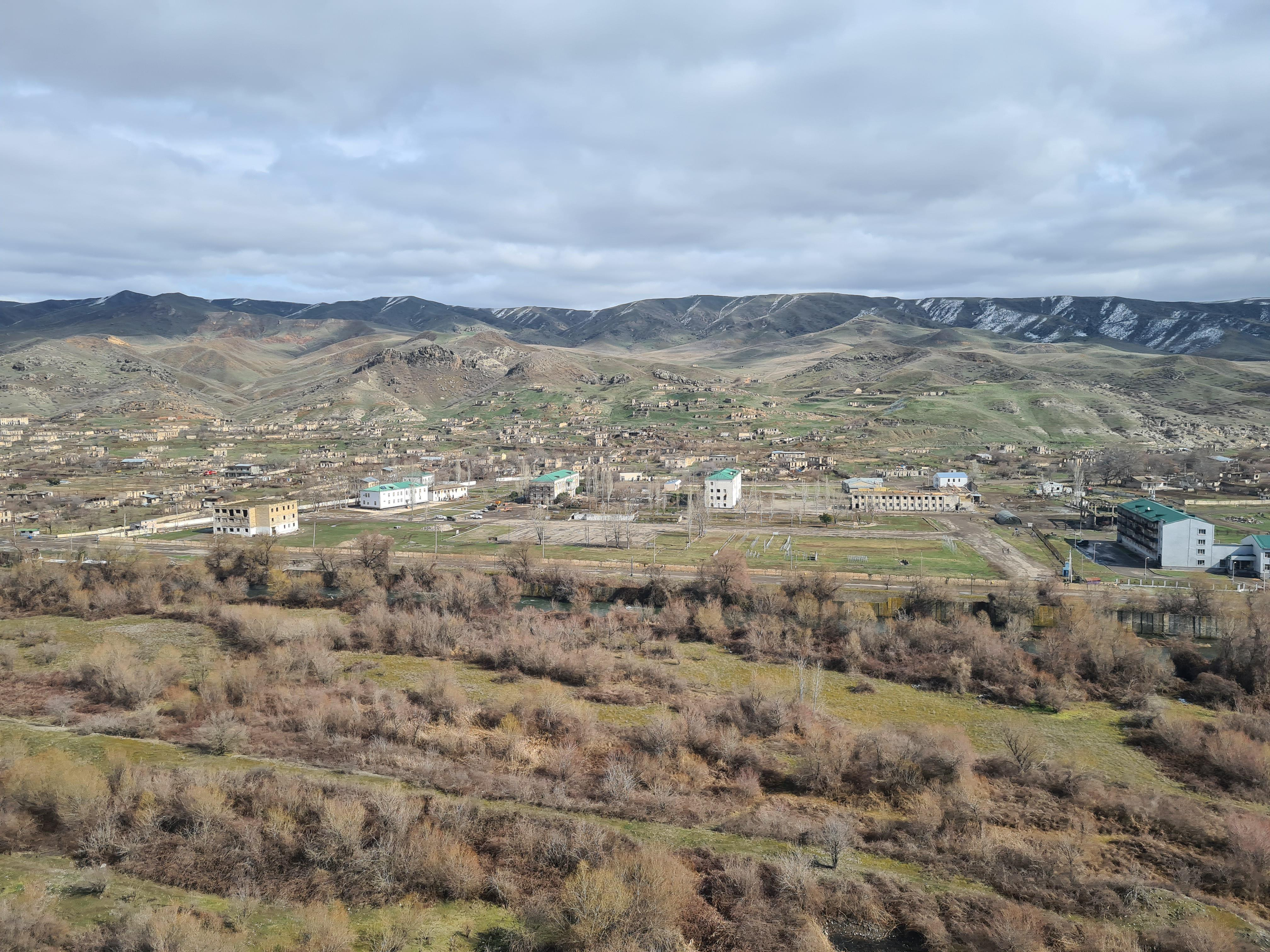
Aerial view of Qubadli

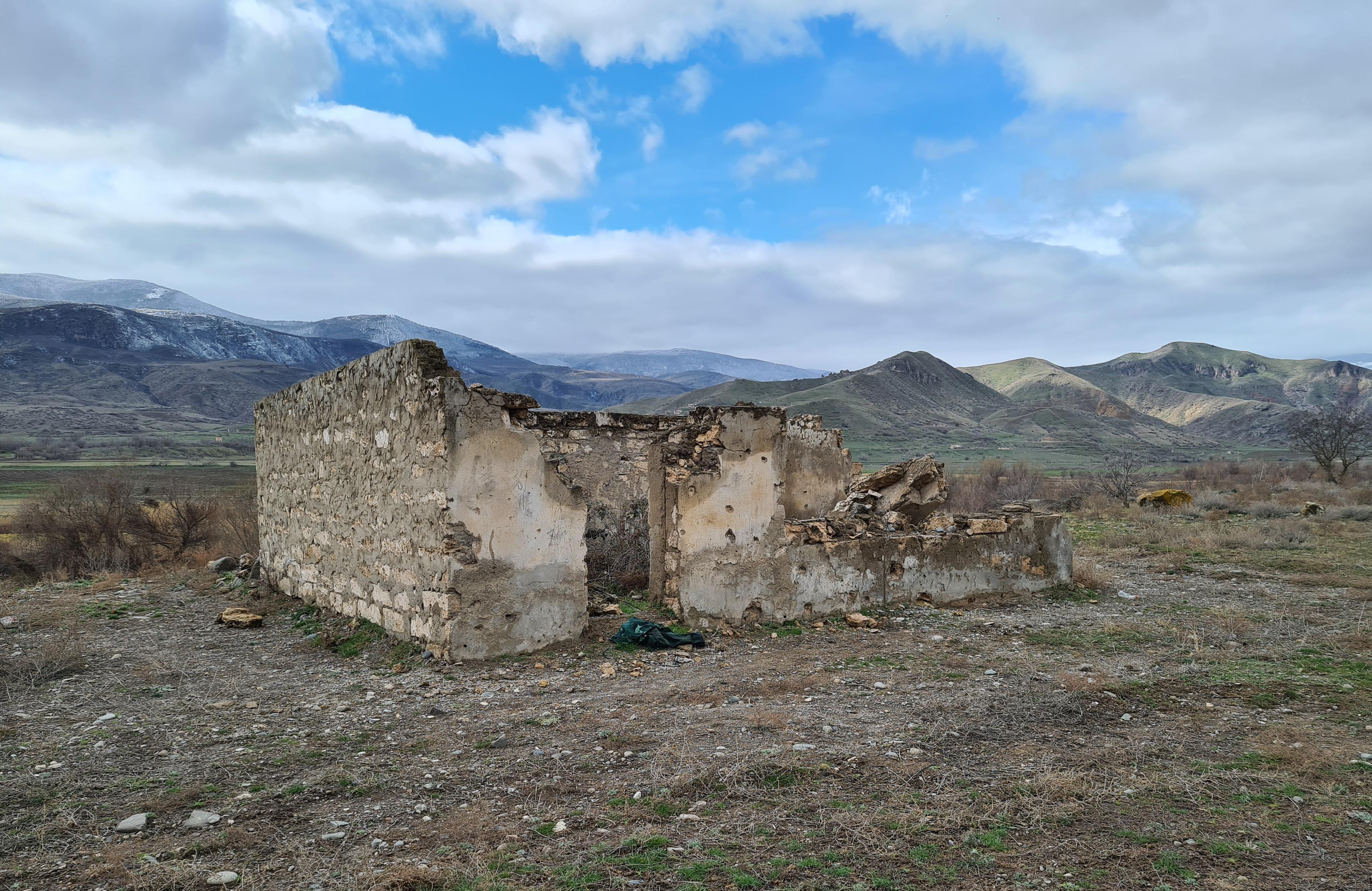

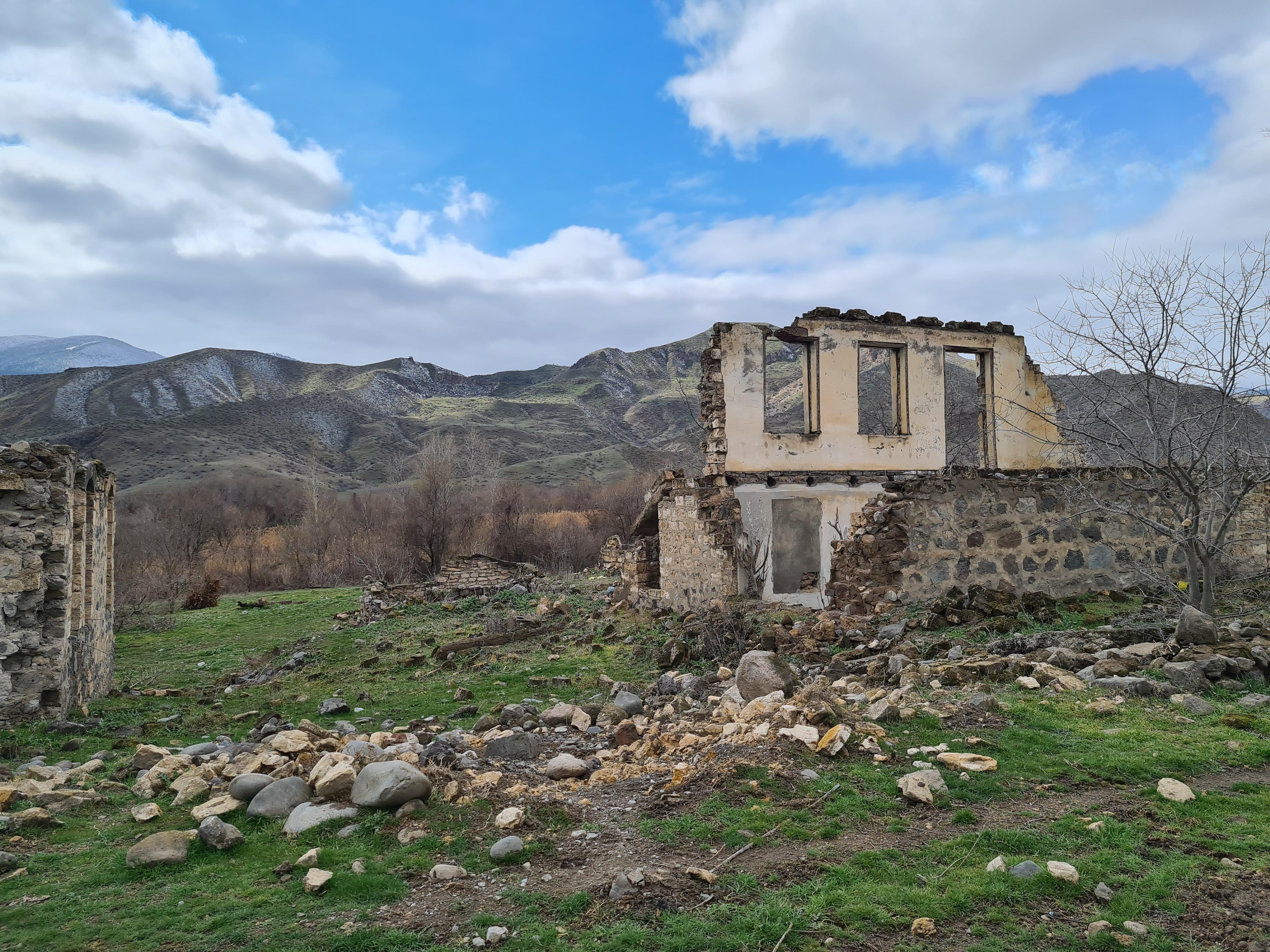

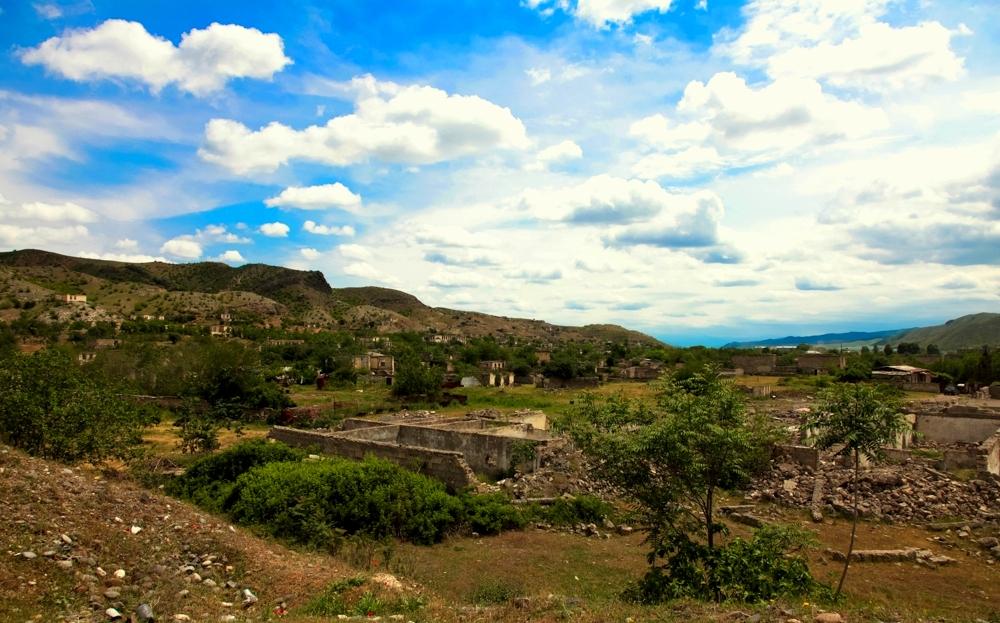
Ruins of Qubadli

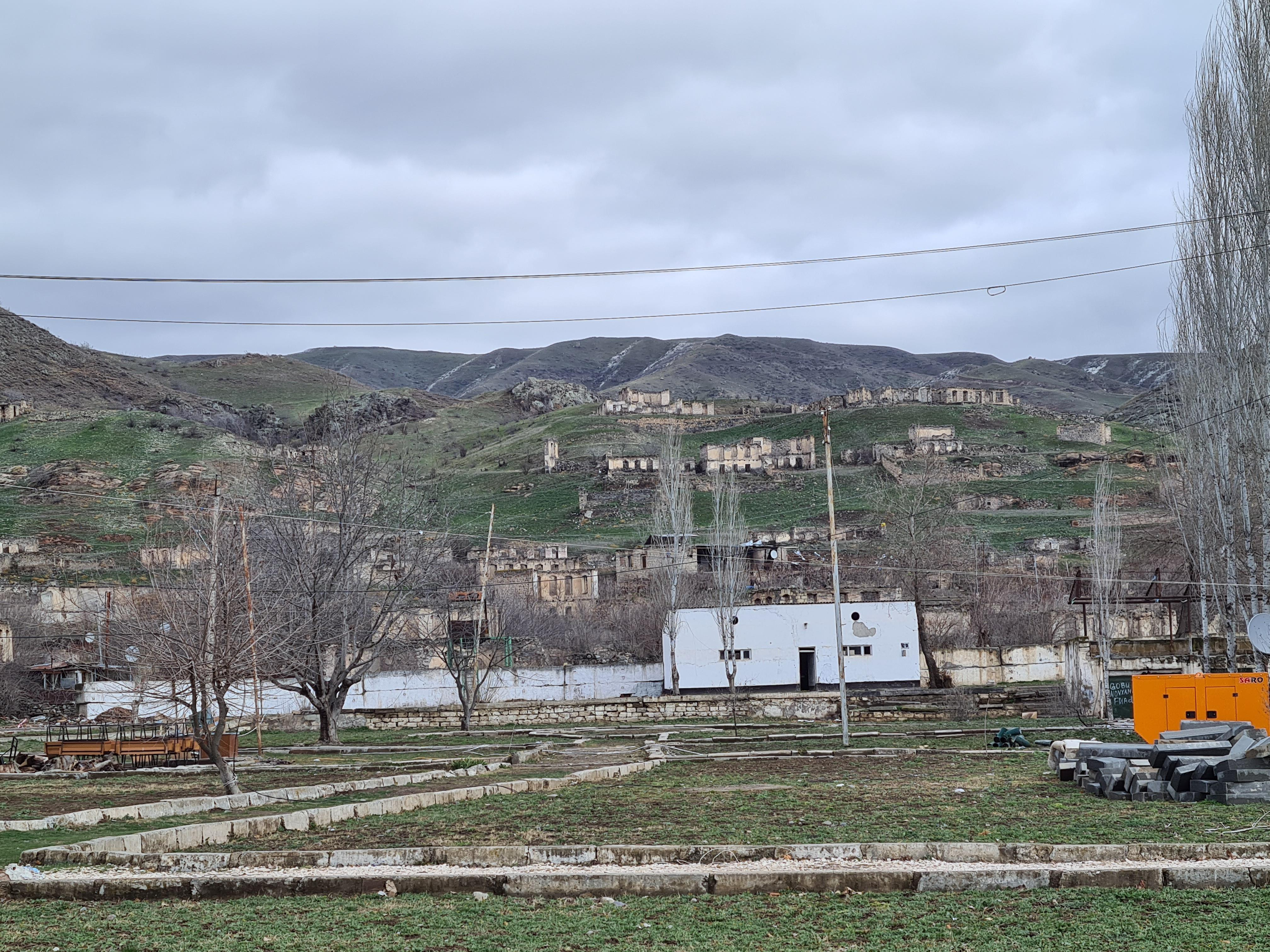
Ruined homes in Qubadli
