= Qayalı, Qubadli =

Qayalı
- Location within Azerbaijan
- Coordinates: 39°23′09″N 46°33′58″E
- Country: Azerbaijan
- District: Qubadli
- Time zone: UTC+4 (AZT)
  - Summer (DST): UTC+5 (AZT)

Qayalı (Gayaly) is a village in the Qubadli District of Azerbaijan.
