= "95th Anniversary of the Armed Forces of Azerbaijan (1918–2013)" Medal =

"95th Anniversary of Azerbaijani Armed Forces (1918–2013)" medal "Azərbaycan Respublikası Silahlı Qüvvələrinin 95 illiyi (1918–2013)" medalı
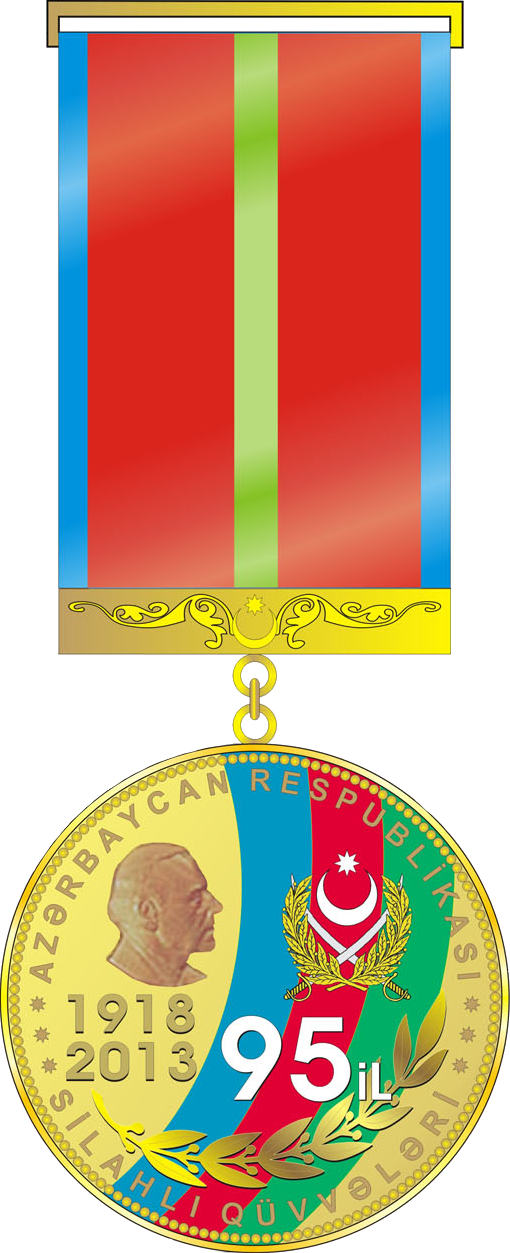
- "95th Anniversary of Azerbaijani Armed Forces (1918–2013)" Jubilee Medal
- Type: Individual Award
- Awarded for: contributing to the formation and strengthening of the Armed Forces of the Republic of Azerbaijan
- Country: Azerbaijan
- Eligibility: Azerbaijani government's military personals including warrant officers, ensigns, retired officers (released or reserve)
- Clasps: 1
- Status: Active
- Established: October 16, 2012
- Ribbon bar of the order

The medal was dedicated to the 95th anniversary of the Armed Forces of the Azerbaijan Democratic Republic in that was established in 1918. It was designed in accordance with the order of the President of Azerbaijan Ilham Aliyev dated October 16, 2012.

The military personals including warrant officers, ensigns, retired officers (released or reserve) who served in the Armed Forces of the Republic of Azerbaijan actively contributed to the formation and strengthening of the Armed Forces of the Republic of Azerbaijan until June 26, 2008 are awarded the medal.

The medal is worn on the left side of the chest, and in the presence of other orders and medals, it is attached after the medal "90th anniversary of the Armed Forces of the Republic of Azerbaijan (1918–2008)".

== Medal description ==
The "95th Anniversary of Azerbaijani Armed Forces (1918–2013)" Jubilee Medal is a round shaped medal made of bronze plated with gold ornaments with a diameter of 35mm.

The ribbon on the right side of the face of the medal is located at the center and is the colours of the National Flag of the Republic of Azerbaijan. The ribbon has In the upper the words "Armed Forces of the Republic of Azerbaijan" inscribed in the upper part, and "95 years" on the bottom part.

A bas-relief of Heydar Aliyev is portrayed on the left side and below the bas-relief are the years "1918" and "2013" in two lines. On the obverse, there is an inscription reading "Republic of Azerbaijan" written at the top and the words "Armed Forces" at the bottom.
