= Special Forces of Azerbaijan =

- Azərbaycan Xüsusi Təyinatlı Qüvvələri
- Emblem of the Special Forces of Azerbaijan
- Founded: 30 April 1999
- Country: Azerbaijan
- Type: Special forces
- Part of: Azerbaijani Land Forces
- Garrison/HQ: Yashma (near Baku)
- Nicknames: Kommando, XTQ
- Motto: "My loyalty is my honor" (Azerbaijani: Sədaqətim Şərəfimdir)
- Engagements: War in Afghanistan; 2014 Armenian-Azerbaijani clashes; 2016 Nagorno-Karabakh conflict; Second Nagorno-Karabakh War; Battle of Shusha (2020)

Commanders
- Current commander: Hikmat Mirzayev
- Current deputy commander

The Special Forces of Azerbaijan (Azerbaijani: Azərbaycan Xüsusi Təyinatlı Qüvvələri) is a special forces unit of the Republic of Azerbaijan.

== History ==
It was established in April 1999 under the Ministry of Defense. The formation of the unit was attended by officers and warrant officers who participated in the First Nagorno-Karabakh War of 1991–1994. The Turkish Special Forces Command played a special role in the formation of the Azerbaijani special forces. On 29 April 2015, in commemoration of the 16th anniversary of their formation a ceremony of presenting battle flags to the newly created special forces units took place. On 26 June 2018, a military parade was held in Baku on the occasion of the 100th anniversary of the Armed Forces of Azerbaijan, with the formation from the Special Forces being led by General Hikmet Mirzaev. On 20 June 2020, a new Special Forces unit was created. In late July and early August of that year, a series of large-scale tactical joint Azerbaijani-Turkish exercises took place on the territory of Azerbaijan, in the first stage of which units of the Azerbaijani Special Forces were also involved.

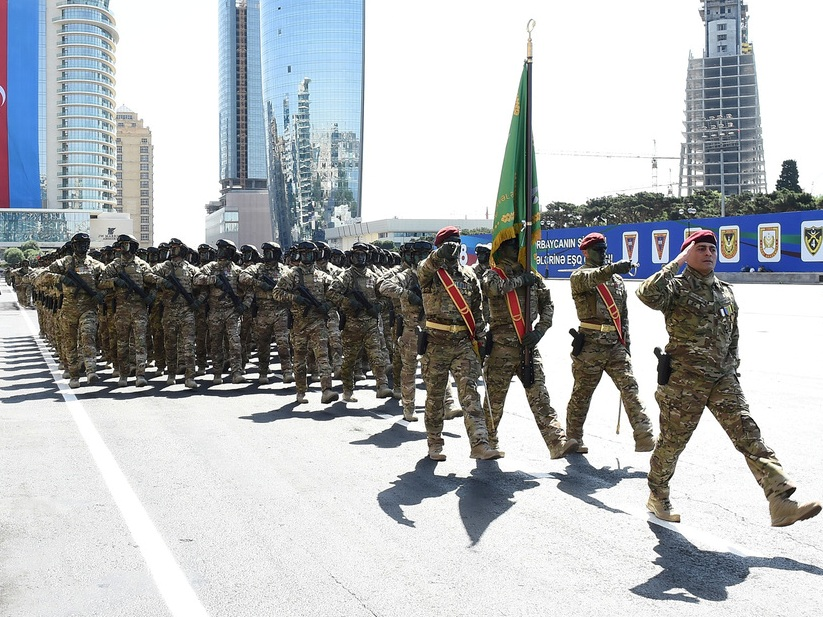
The parade formation of the Special Forces during a parade on the Day of the Armed Forces of Azerbaijan in June 2018.

=== Battles and wars ===
During the 2020 Nagorno-Karabakh War, personnel of the Special Forces captured the city of Jebrayil and nine surrounding villages from the Armenian Armed Forces. On November 8, Aliyev congratulated the commander of the Special Forces on their "liberation of Shusha". Many of the tactical victory in the war were attributed to "saboteur groups" from the Special Forces that provided target coordinates from their positions on the ground as well as entered the city and pushed the Armenian Army out from the city center. The war was considered to be first time Azerbaijan has actively used all of its special forces units.

Typically 30 out of 500 candidates earn the "Maroon beret" certificate. Cadets are taught to survive and execute their mission, even if they are hungry and thirsty for days. They are taught to eat whatever they find, such as frogs and snakes. They receive weapons training covering firearms and explosives. Officers operate under the rank of ensign.

== Equipment ==
- Zafer P
- Inam
- Glock 19
- Heckler & Koch MP5
- IMI Uzi
- Aztex AR-15
- M4 carbine
- M16 rifle
- Heckler & Koch G36
- SIG SG 550
- IWI Tavor X95
- IMI Tavor TAR-21
- MPT-76

== Notable personnel ==
- Murad Mirzayev
- Samid Imanov
- Zaur Mammadov
- Anar Aliyev

== Gallery ==
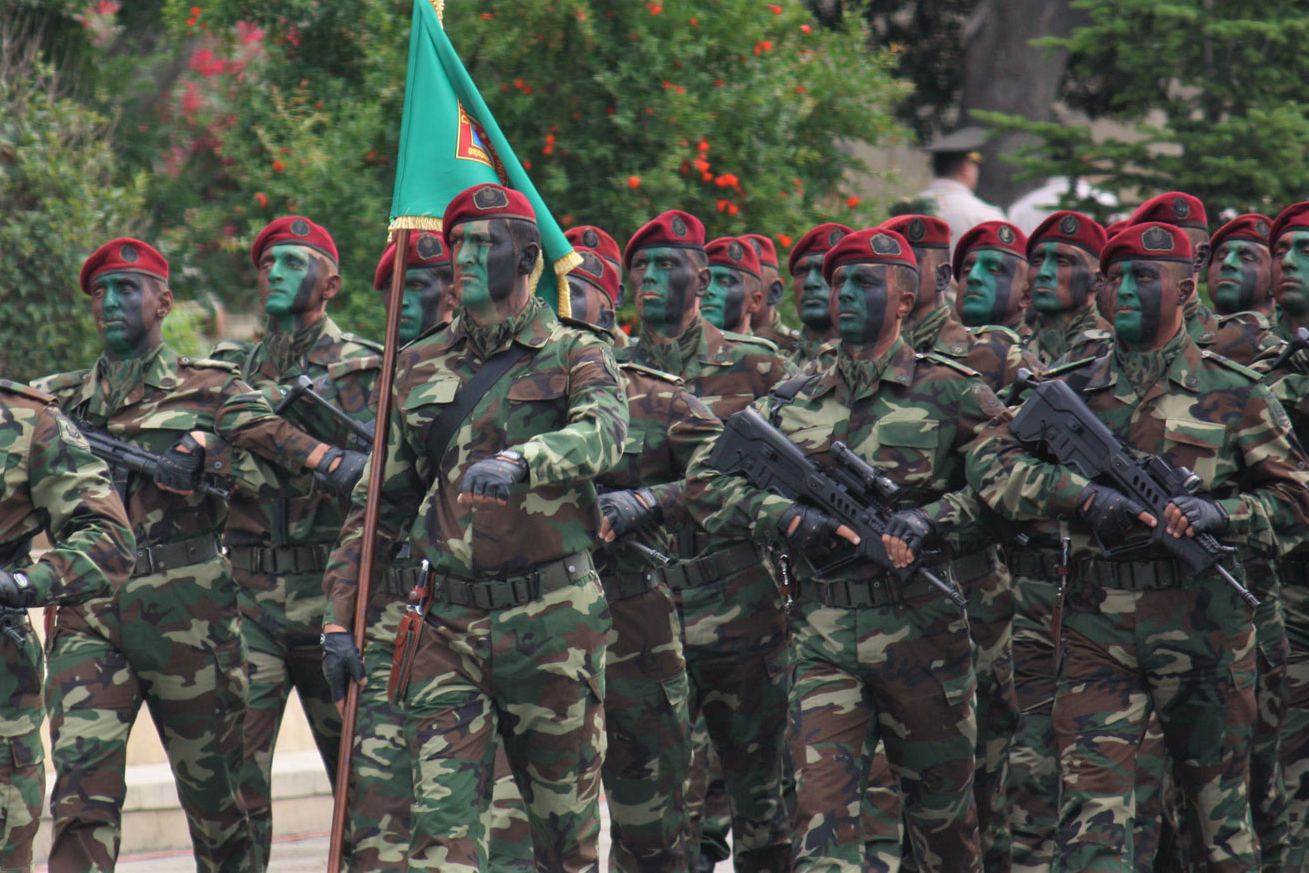
Members of the Azerbaijani Special Forces during a military parade in Baku 2011.

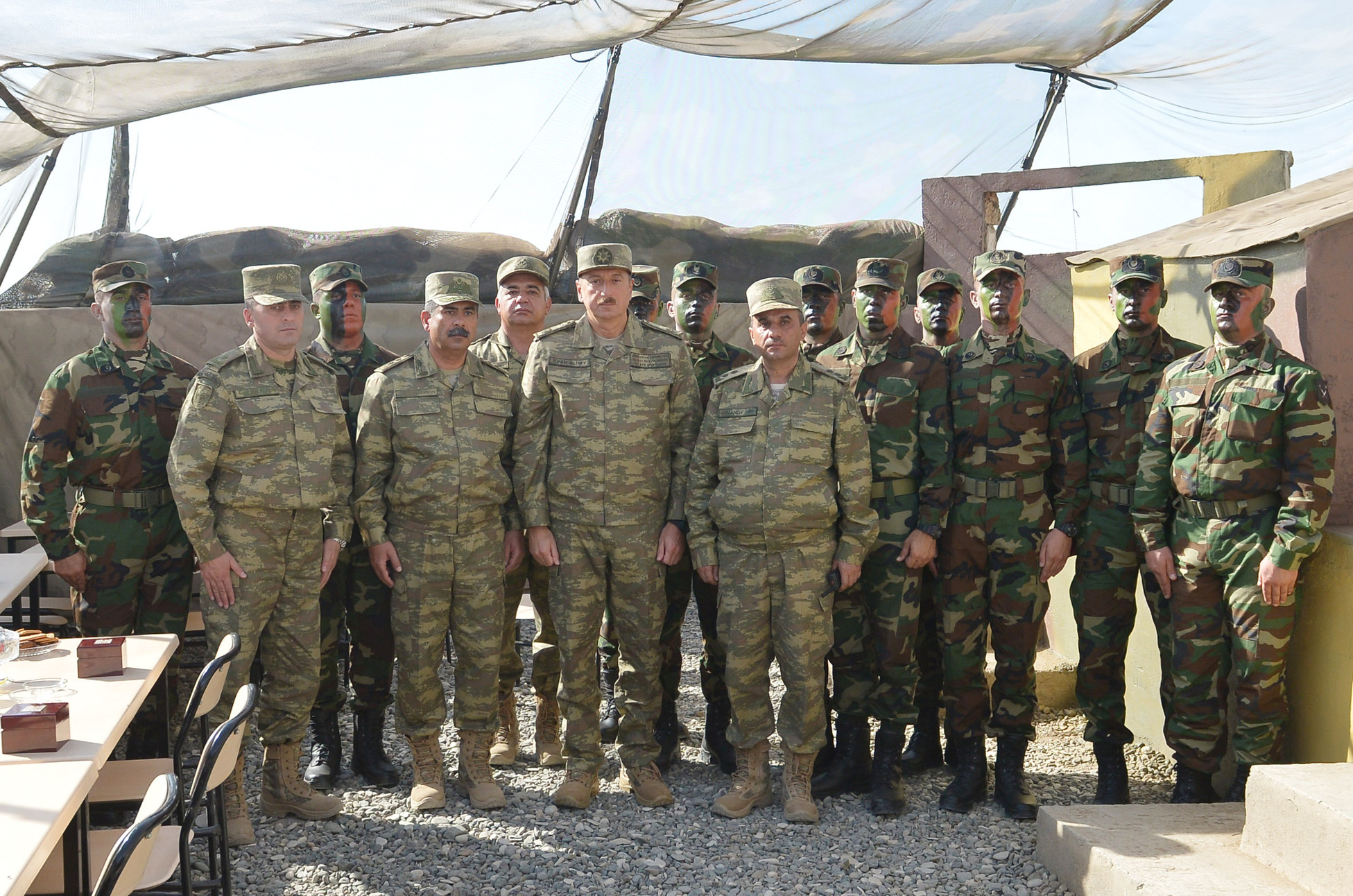
President Ilham Aliyev during a visit a special forces military unit in Aghdam.

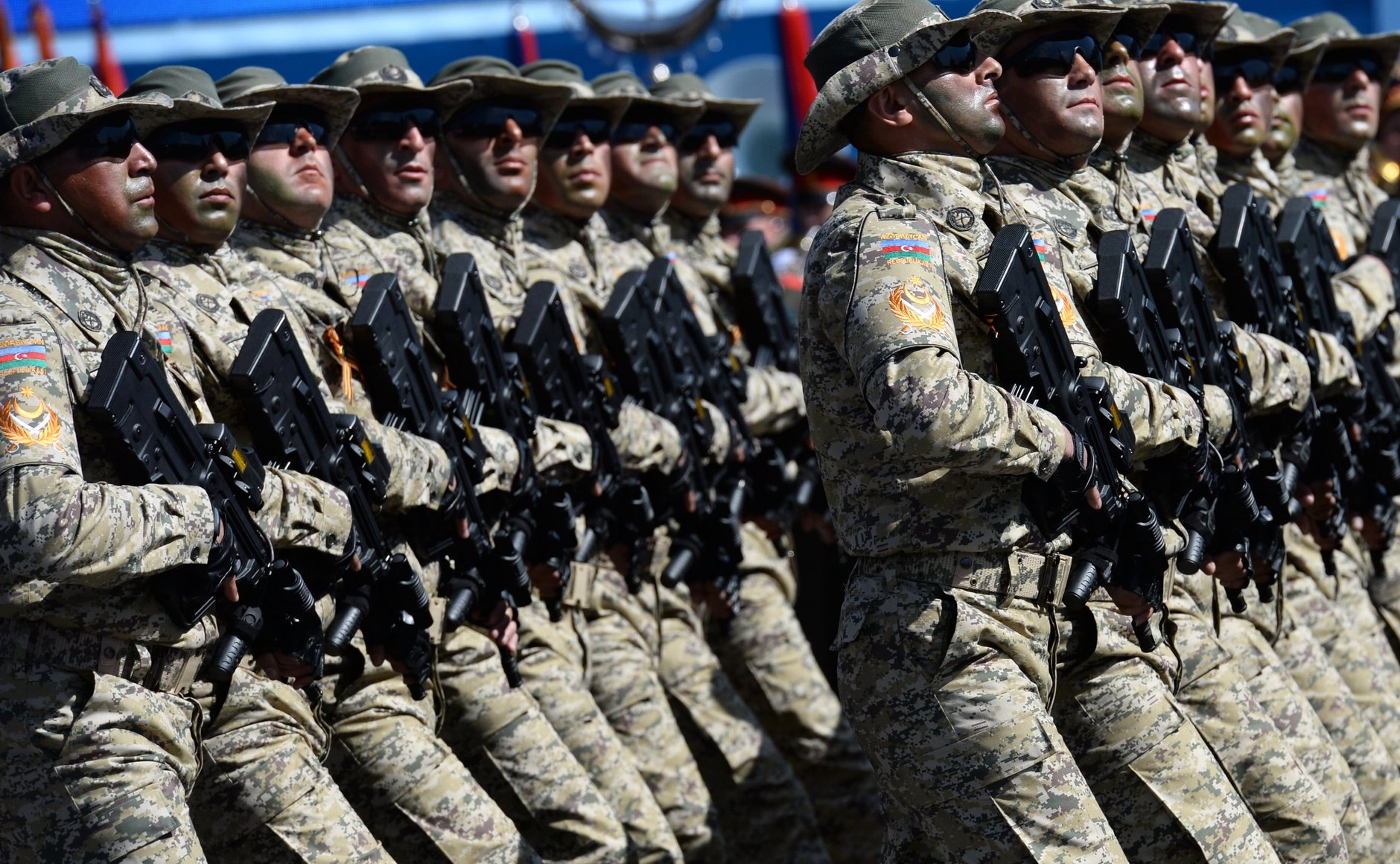
Soldiers of the Special Forces during the 2015 Moscow Victory Day Parade on Red Square.

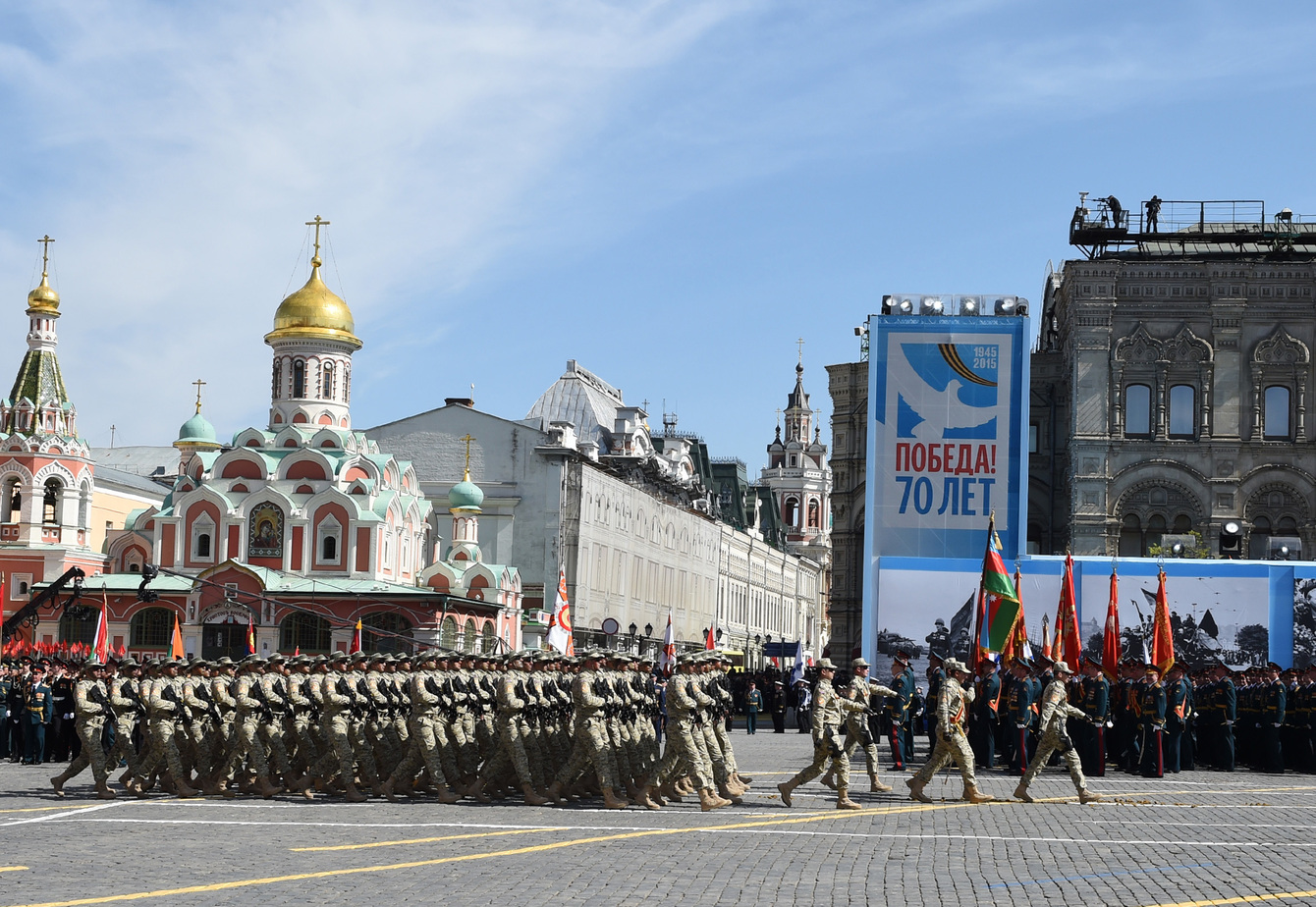
A 70-man formation of servicemen in the Special Forces, led by Major Mehdi Mahmudov, marching into Red Square.

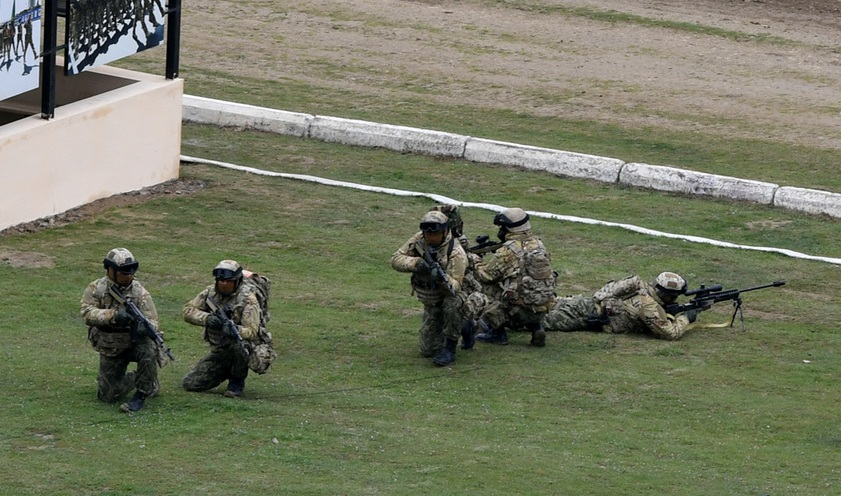
Training at a military unit of Defense Ministry's Special Forces.

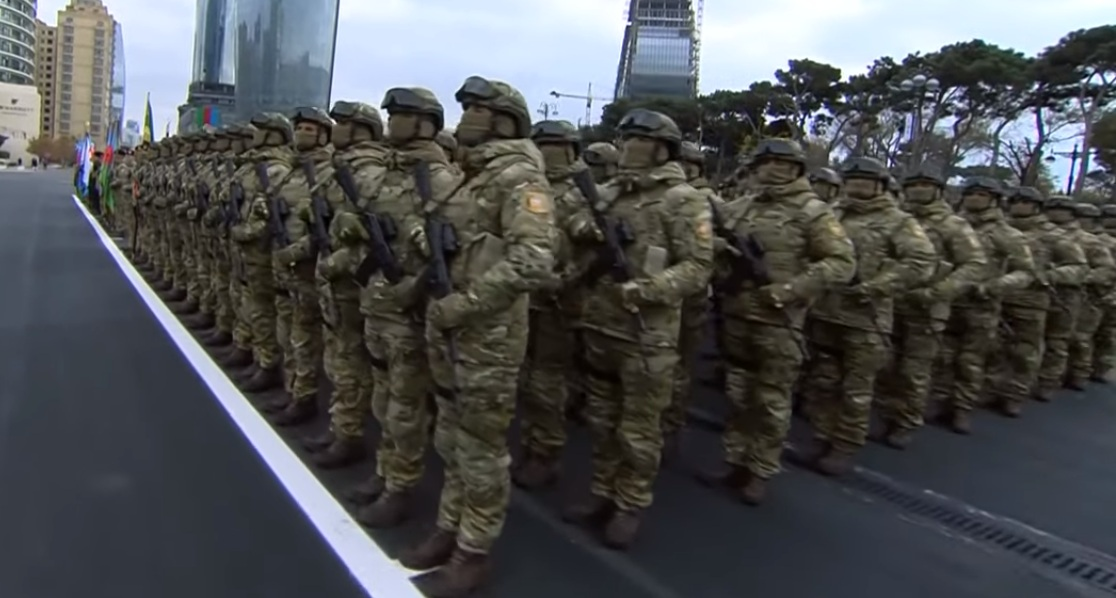
Servicemen of the Special Forces of the Ministry of Defense at the Baku Victory Parade of 2020.

== See also ==
- Azerbaijani Armed Forces
