= Hero of the Patriotic War =

Highest title in Azerbaijan

Hero of the Patriotic War Vətən Müharibəsi Qəhrəmanı
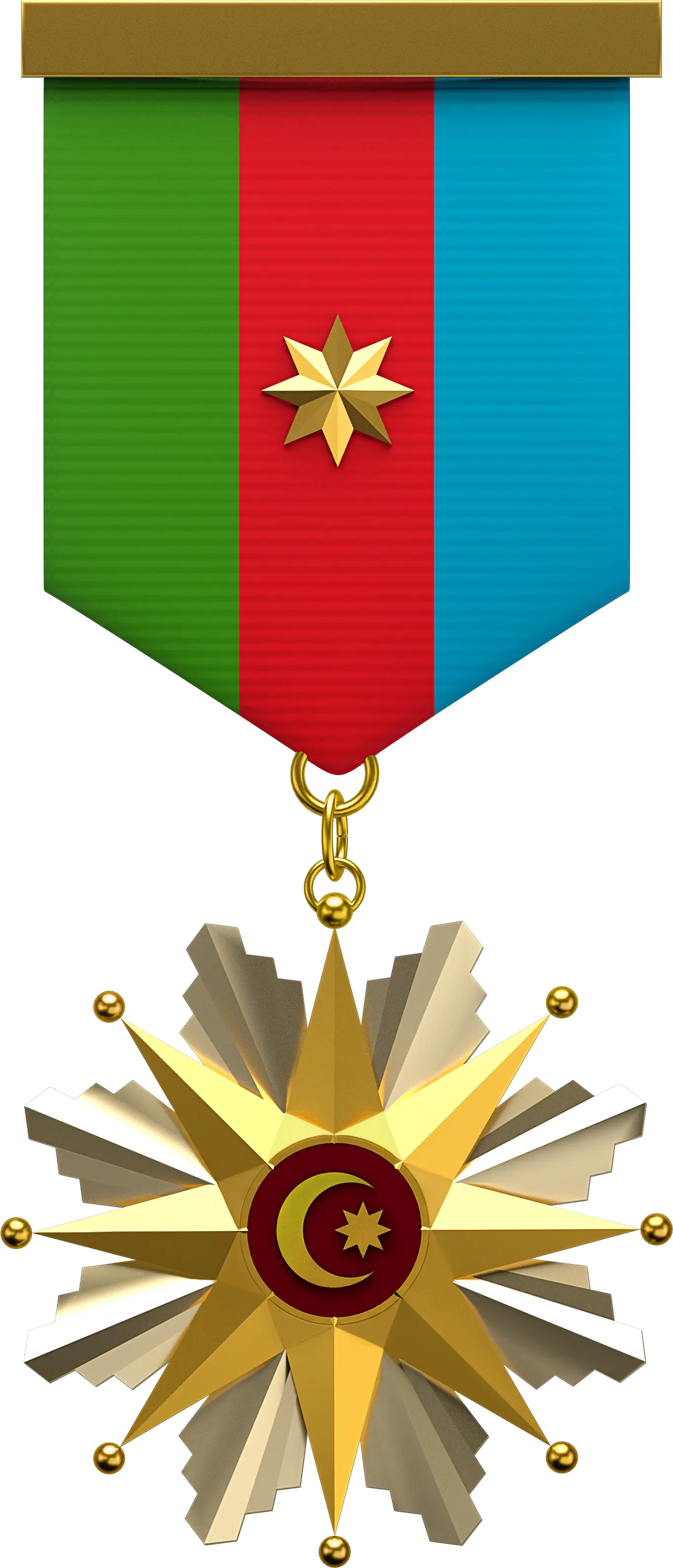
- Hero of the Patriotic War Medal
- Type: Individual Award
- Awarded for: Military merits in the complete defeat of the enemy, as well as high professionalism in the management of military operations or personal heroism in the restoration of the state borders of Azerbaijan.
- Status: Active
- Established: 26 November 2020

Highlights
- Total: 83

Precedence
- Next (higher): none
- Next (lower): National Hero of Azerbaijan

The Hero of the Patriotic War (Azerbaijani: Vətən Müharibəsi Qəhrəmanı) is the highest title in Azerbaijan. The title was created by the law "Regulations on the title of 'Hero of the Patriotic War' of the Republic of Azerbaijan" dated 26 November 2020 and the decree of the President of Azerbaijan, Ilham Aliyev dated 1 December 2020. It was established on the occasion of Azerbaijan being the victor in the Second Nagorno-Karabakh War. Its recipient is also awarded with the Hero of the Patriotic War Medal.

The title of Hero of the Patriotic War is conferred by the President of Azerbaijan on his own initiative, or on the proposal of the Ministry of Defence, the Ministry of Internal Affairs, the State Border Service, the State Security Service, and the Foreign Intelligence Service of Azerbaijan. This title can only be awarded once. The Heroes of the Patriotic War enjoy the benefits established by law.

== History ==
On 11 November 2020, the President of Azerbaijan, Ilham Aliyev, at a meeting with wounded Azerbaijani servicemen who took part in the Second Nagorno-Karabakh War, said that new orders and medals would be established in Azerbaijan, and that he gave appropriate instructions on awarding civilians and servicemen who showed "heroism on the battlefield and in the rear and distinguished themselves in this war." He also proposed the names of these orders and medals. On 20 November 2020, at a plenary session of the Azerbaijani National Assembly, a draft law on amendments to the law "On the establishment of orders and medals of the Republic of Azerbaijan" was submitted for discussion.

The Hero of the Patriotic War Medal was established on the same day in the first reading in accordance with the bill "On the establishment of orders and medals of the Republic of Azerbaijan" on the occasion of Azerbaijan being the victor in the Second Nagorno-Karabakh War.

=== Awarding ===
On 9 December, the President of Azerbaijan, Ilham Aliyev signed a decree to award 83 servicemen, 34 of them posthumously with the title of the Hero of the Patriotic War. The awardees included Hikmat Mirzayev, the commander of the special forces, Ilham Mehdiyev, the deputy chief of the State Border Service, as well as the officers Namig Islamzadeh, Kanan Seyidov, and Zaur Mammadov.

== Status ==
The title of Hero of the Patriotic War is the highest title in Azerbaijan. Previously, the title of National Hero of Azerbaijan was the highest title in the country. The title is awarded for "military merits in the complete defeat of the enemy, as well as high professionalism in the management of military operations or personal heroism in the restoration of the state borders of Azerbaijan". The Hero of the Patriotic War is awarded a special distinction, the Hero of the Patriotic War Medal.

== Recipients ==
- Babak Alakbarov, Colonel in the State Border Service of Azerbaijan
- Ramiz Gasimov, lieutenant colonel of the Azerbaijani Air Forces.
- Namig Islamzade, garrison commander in the "N" military unit of the Azerbaijani Air Force in Kurdamir District.
- Zaur Javanshir, the first commandant of Shusha after its capture.
- Ilham Mehdiyev, lieutenant general, and the deputy head of the Azerbaijani State Border Service.
- Hikmat Mirzayev, Commander of the Special Forces of Azerbaijan.
- Asim Munir, Field Marshal and Chief of Army Staff of the Pakistan Armed Forces.
