= Baku Victory Parade of 2020 =

Military Triumph Parade in 2020

Baku Victory Parade
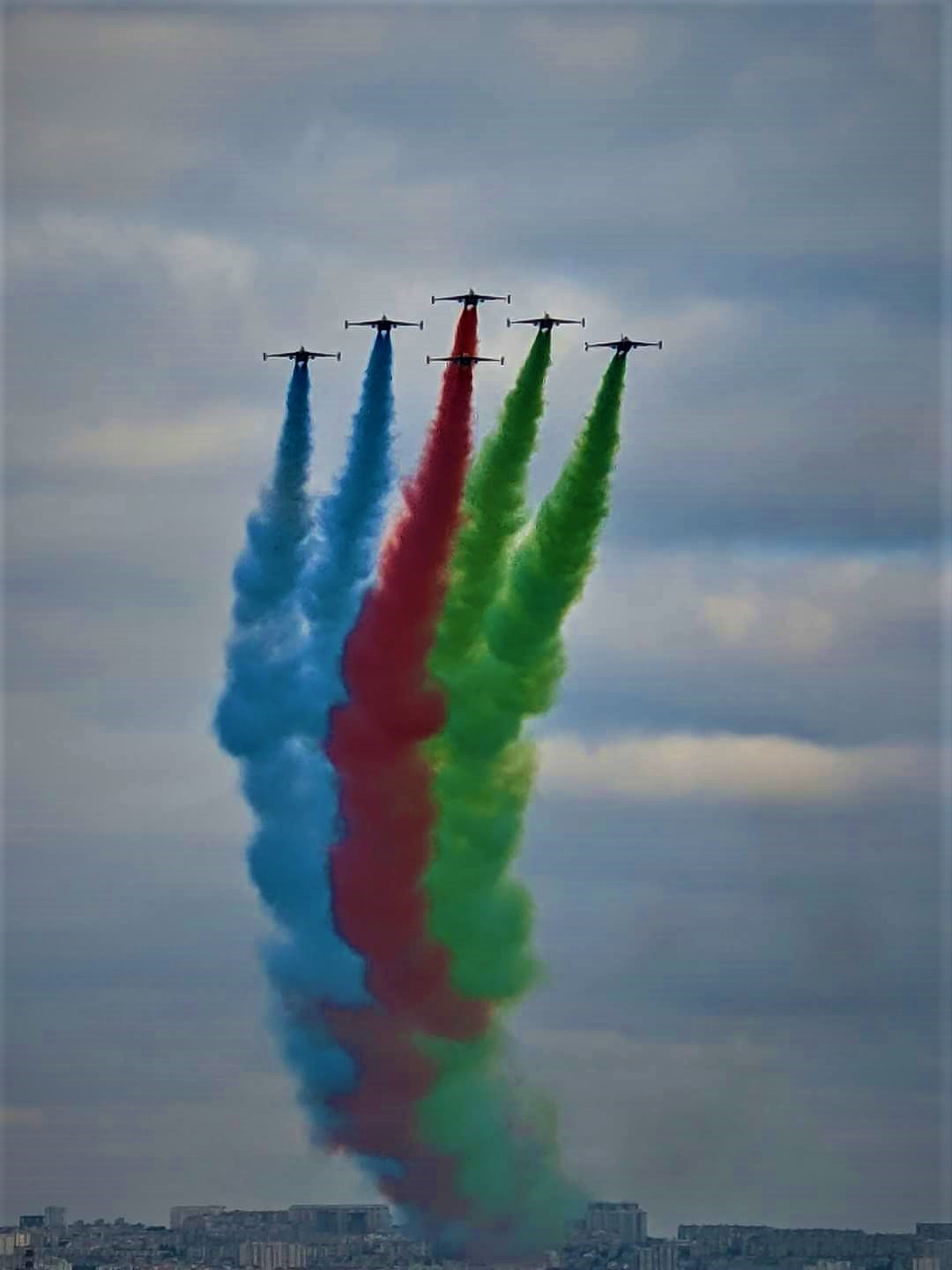
- Azerbaijani Sukhoi Su-25 planes during the parade.
- Native name: Zəfər paradı
- Date: 10 December 2020
- Time: 13:00
- Location: Azadliq Square, Baku, Azerbaijan
- Type: Military parade
- Cause: Azerbaijani victory in the Second Nagorno-Karabakh war
- Organised by: Azerbaijani Ministry of Defence
- Participants: Azerbaijan; Turkey

2020 Baku Victory Parade (Azerbaijani: Zəfər paradı) was held on 10 December, in Azadliq Square, Baku, capital of Azerbaijan. It was held in honor of the Azerbaijani victory during the Second Nagorno-Karabakh war, officially described as the Patriotic War in Azerbaijan. The parade was held with 3,000 military servicemen who distinguished themselves during the war marched alongside military equipment, unmanned aerial vehicles and aircraft, as well as Armenian war trophies, and Turkish soldiers and officers, while navy vessels performed maneuvers in the nearby Bay of Baku, and jets and helicopters flew above the city. Turkish President Recep Tayyip Erdoğan, a key ally of Azerbaijan in the war, also attended the military parade as part of a state visit to Baku.

The military parade aroused great interest among Baku residents, who gathered in different parts of the city and tried to watch the parade closely, despite the COVID-19 related regulations.

The parade was criticized in Armenia due to the Azerbaijani president Ilham Aliyev declaring the Syunik, Gegharkunik, and Yerevan regions of Armenia to be the "historical lands" of Azerbaijanis, and Erdoğan's remarks on the spirit of Enver Pasha, who was one of the masterminds of the Armenian genocide. Both statements were condemned by Armenian prime minister Nikol Pashinyan. Aliyev has made irredentist claims over Armenian territories multiple times, vowing to "return to them", declaring: "Yerevan is our historical land and we Azerbaijanis must return to these historical lands". Later on 22 July 2021, Aliyev made another irredentist claim over Armenia's province Zangezur (Syunik), saying that it's "our own territory".

During the parade, Erdogan also recited parts of a controversial Soviet Azerbaijani poem, which sparked tensions with neighboring Iran.

== Background ==
On 27 September 2020, clashes broke out in the disputed Nagorno-Karabakh region, which was de facto controlled by the self-proclaimed and unrecognized Republic of Artsakh, but de jure part of Azerbaijan. Azerbaijani forces first advanced in Fuzuli and Jabrayil districts, taking their respective administrative centres. From there, they proceeded towards Hadrut. Azerbaijani troops began to advance more intensively after the fall of Hadrut around 15 October, and Armenians began to retreat, with Azerbaijanis then taking control of Zangilan and Qubadli. Launching an offensive for Lachin, they also penetrated into Shusha District through its forests and mountain passes.

Following the capture of Shusha, the second-largest settlement in Nagorno-Karabakh, a ceasefire agreement was signed between the President of Azerbaijan, Ilham Aliyev, the Prime Minister of Armenia, Nikol Pashinyan, and the President of Russia, Vladimir Putin, ending all hostilities in the area from 00:00, 10 November 2020 Moscow Time. Under the agreement, the warring sides will keep control of their currently held areas within Nagorno-Karabakh, while Armenia will return the surrounding territories it occupied in 1994 to Azerbaijan. Azerbaijan will also gain land access to its Nakhchivan exclave bordering Turkey and Iran. Approximately 2,000 Russian soldiers will be deployed as peacekeeping forces along the Lachin corridor between Armenia and Nagorno-Karabakh for a mandate of at least five years.

== Parade ==
=== Before the parade ===
In early December, it was revealed that a victory parade would be held on 10 December in Azadliq Square, Baku, capital of Azerbaijan. Traffic was restricted on some streets and avenues to ensure the safety of military parade-related equipment. On 5 December, the Azerbaijani Armed Forces started training exercises for the parade. On December 8, a training exercise was held at the military parade, during which the military booty seized by the Azerbaijani Armed Forces from Armenia was demonstrated. Also, training flights of Azerbaijani Air Force planes and helicopters were carried out over Baku.

On 9 December, President of Turkey, Recep Tayyip Erdoğan arrived by plane at the Heydar Aliyev International Airport in Baku. Erdoğan was greeted by Azerbaijani officials and Turkish diplomats in Baku. He was accompanied by his wife Emine Erdoğan, foreign minister Mevlüt Çavuşoğlu, defence minister Hulusi Akar, spokesman of the ruling Justice and Development Party Ömer Çelik, the party's deputy chairman Mahir Ünal, spokesman of the presidential administration İbrahim Kalın and Turkish Presidential Administration Public Relations Director Fahrettin Altun.

On 10 December, Ilham Aliyev and Erdoğan visited the Martyrs' Lane, and laid wreaths at the Eternal Torch monument. Then, they went to Alley of Honor to honor the memory of former President of Azerbaijan, Heydar Aliyev, and laid wreaths at his grave. Both Aliyev and Erdoğan prayed in the Mosque of the Martyrs.

=== Pre-parade speech ===
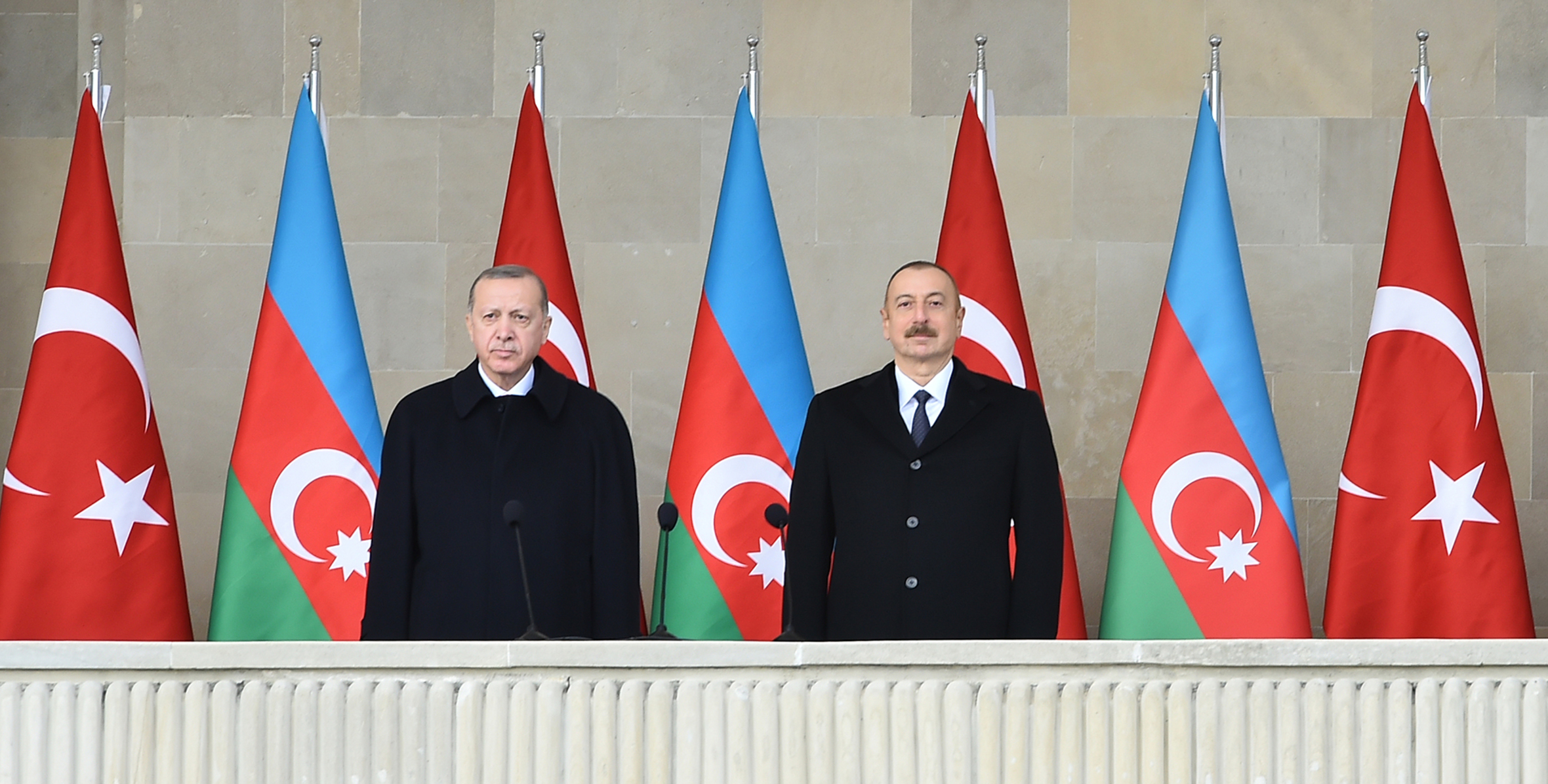
President of Azerbaijan, Ilham Aliyev, and President of Turkey, Recep Tayyip Erdoğan during the parade.

The parade began with the massed bands playing both Azərbaycan marşı and İstiklal Marşı after the arrival of the two heads of state.

During his speech, President of Azerbaijan, Ilham Aliyev, stated that hundreds of thousands of Azerbaijanis living in the present-day Armenia were "expelled from their ancestral lands", adding that Zangezur, Goycha, and Iravan were the "historical lands of Azerbaijan", and that the Armenian leadership had expelled hundreds of thousands of Azerbaijanis from Armenia, as well as Nagorno-Karabakh. Ilham Aliyev also noted that three days before the war began, at UN General Assembly, he said that "Armenia was preparing for a new war and they must be stopped". He added that in 2020, Armenia launched three attacks against Azerbaijan, in July, in August, and in September. And in response, he had "ordered the Azerbaijani soldiers to move forward." Aliyev then recalled the Battle of Shusha, calling it a "historic event". At the end, Aliyev stated that the Azerbaijani army had defeated Armenia, and that the Armenian Army was almost "non-existent and destroyed", adding that if the "Armenian fascism rises again, the result will be the same".

The President of Turkey, Recep Tayyip Erdoğan also made a speech. He first wished God's mercy to the Azerbaijani soldiers who were killed or wounded during the war, then continued to praise the Azerbaijani–Turkish relations. He then added that those who brought "nothing but massacres and tears to Karabakh must now come to their senses", and that the Armenian politicians should take "bold steps towards peace and stability." Erdoğan, reciting a controversial Soviet Azerbaijani poem, then stated that it was the day that the "souls of Ahmad Javad, Nuru Pasha, Enver Pasha and Mubariz Ibrahimov were enlightened". He also stressed that the "struggle in the political and military spheres will continue on different fronts."

=== Features ===
==== Personnel ====
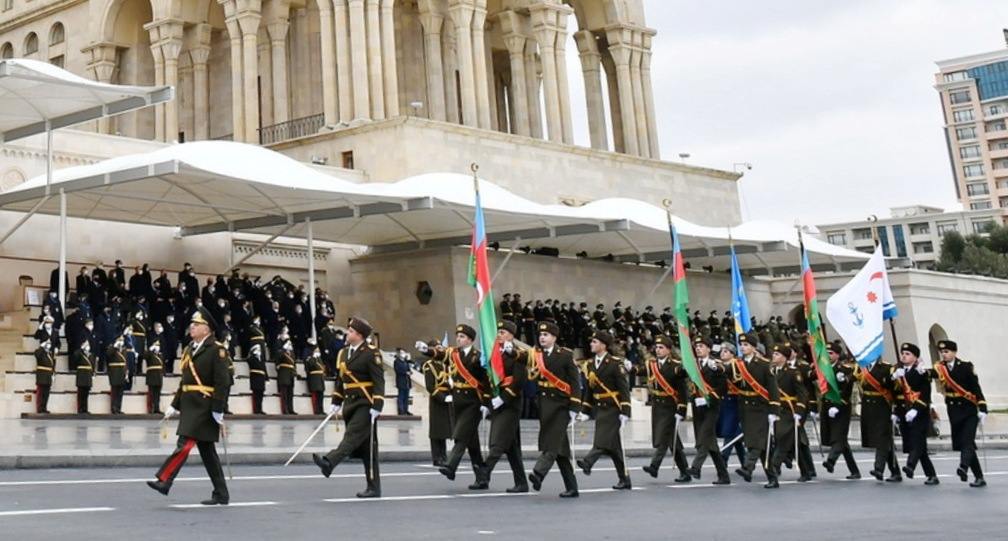
Presentation of Azerbaijani flag, the Banner of Victory, and the flags of the branches of the Azerbaijani Armed Forces, led by the Lieutenant General Karim Valiyev.

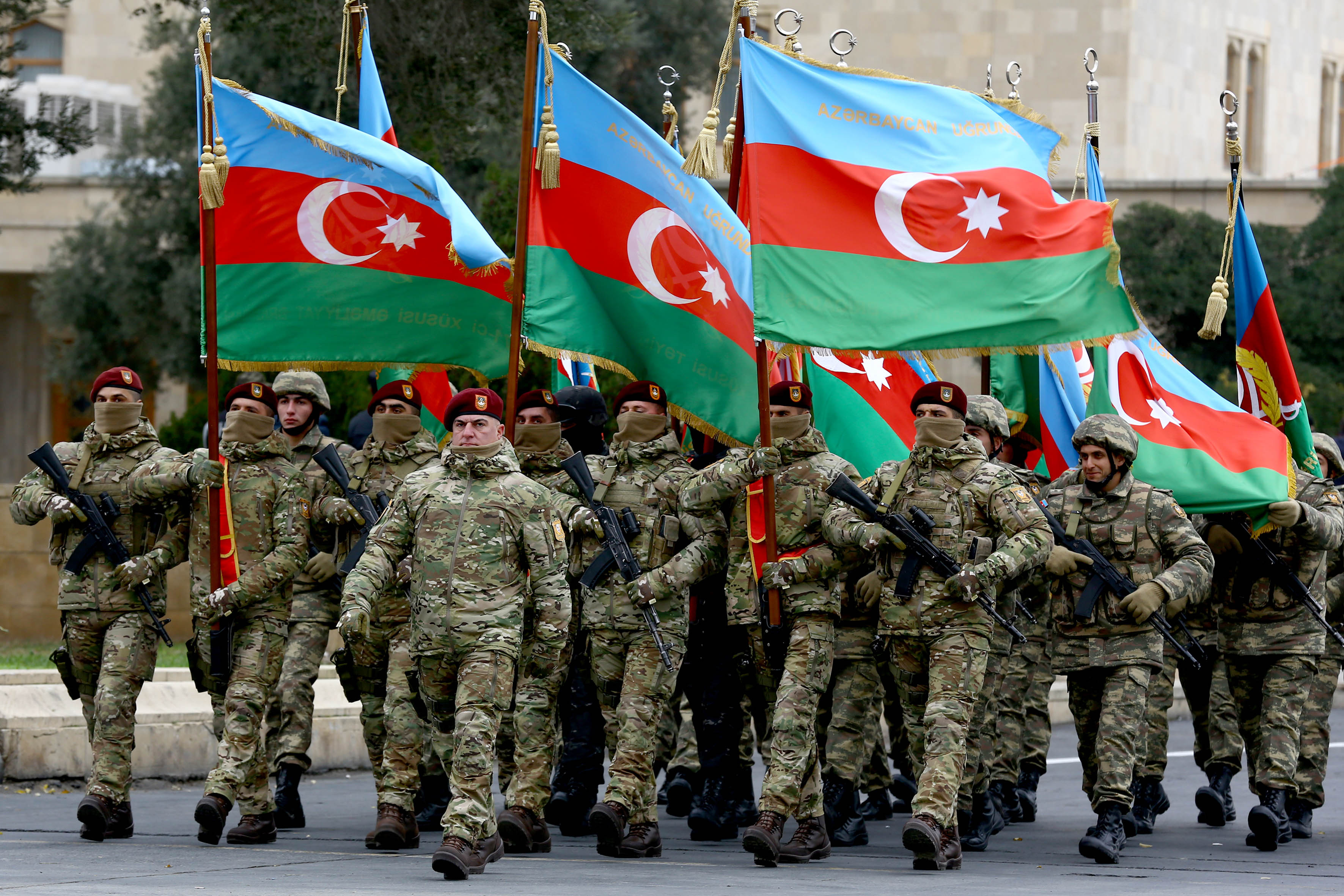
Servicemen marching with banners of the military units that distinguished themselves during the war, led by Major General Zaur Mammadov.

The personnel of the Azerbaijani Armed Forces marched on following the address in the grounds of Azadliq Square under the Victory Banner, which is a flag planted in Shusha when the Azerbaijan forces seized the city's control. Following the state flag and the Victory Banner, and a joint service color guard bearing the colours of the service branches of the Azerbaijani Armed Forces approached the square. At the head of the march in front of the colours was the parade commander, Lieutenant General Karim Valiyev, who saluted to the authorities in the rostum. The battle colours of the military units of the Armed Forces that took part in the war, which on that day were carried by colour guards in combat dress uniforms, marched past front of the rostrum under the leadership of Major General Zaur Mammadov. The military conductor of the parade massed bands was the Honored Artist of Azerbaijan, Lieutenant Colonel Rufat Akhundzadeh, the son of Yusif Akhundzade, who is the incumbent Chief of the Military Band Service of the Armed Forces. The official parade master of ceremonies was the Honored Artist of Azerbaijan, the President's personal pensioner, Colonel Abdullah Gurbani.

The following was the order of the parade's ground column, following the parade commander and the national flag color guard:

- Personnel of the Special Forces of the Ministry of Defense, led by the Commander of the Special Forces, Lieutenant General Hikmat Mirzayev
- Personnel of the Marines of the Azerbaijani Navy, led by First Class Captain Zaur Guliyev
- Personnel of the YARASA Special Forces of the Foreign Intelligence Service
- Personnel of the State Security Service, led by Major General Rovshan Mukhtarov
- Personnel of the Special Forces of the Nakhchivan Army, led by Colonel Said Isayev
- Personnel of the 1st Army Corps, led by Colonel Taleh Mashadiyev
- Personnel of the 2nd Army Corps, led by Colonel Nemat Museyibov
- Personnel of the 3rd Army Corps, led by Lieutenant Colonel Kamran Aghabalayev
- Personnel of the 4th Army Corps, led by Colonel Ilham Mammadov
- Personnel of the 6th Army Corps, led by Lieutenant Colonel Dayanat Muslimov
- Personnel of the Missile and Artillery Troops, led by Colonel Ismikhan Mammadov
- Personnel of the 2nd Commando Brigade, led by Captain Harun Ergin
- Personnel of the State Border Service, led by Major General Rasul Tagiyev
- Personnel of the Internal Troops of the Ministry of Internal Affairs, led by Major General Ingilab Muradov
- Personnel of the National Guard of Azerbaijan, led by Major Eldar Guliyev
- Officer cadets of the Azerbaijan Higher Military Academy, led by Academy Superintendent Major General Fuzuli Salahov
- Students of the Heydar Aliyev Military Lyceum, led by the Lyceum Superintendent Major General Mahammad Hasanov
- Students of the Jamshid Nakhchivanski Military Lyceum, led by the Lyceum Superintendent Major General Bakir Orujov

The march past segment of the parade ended with the performance of the Ottoman military song Ceddin Deden by the massed bands. Veterans of the Azerbaijani Armed Forces who took part in the war also passed thorough the parade in military vehicles.

Personnel

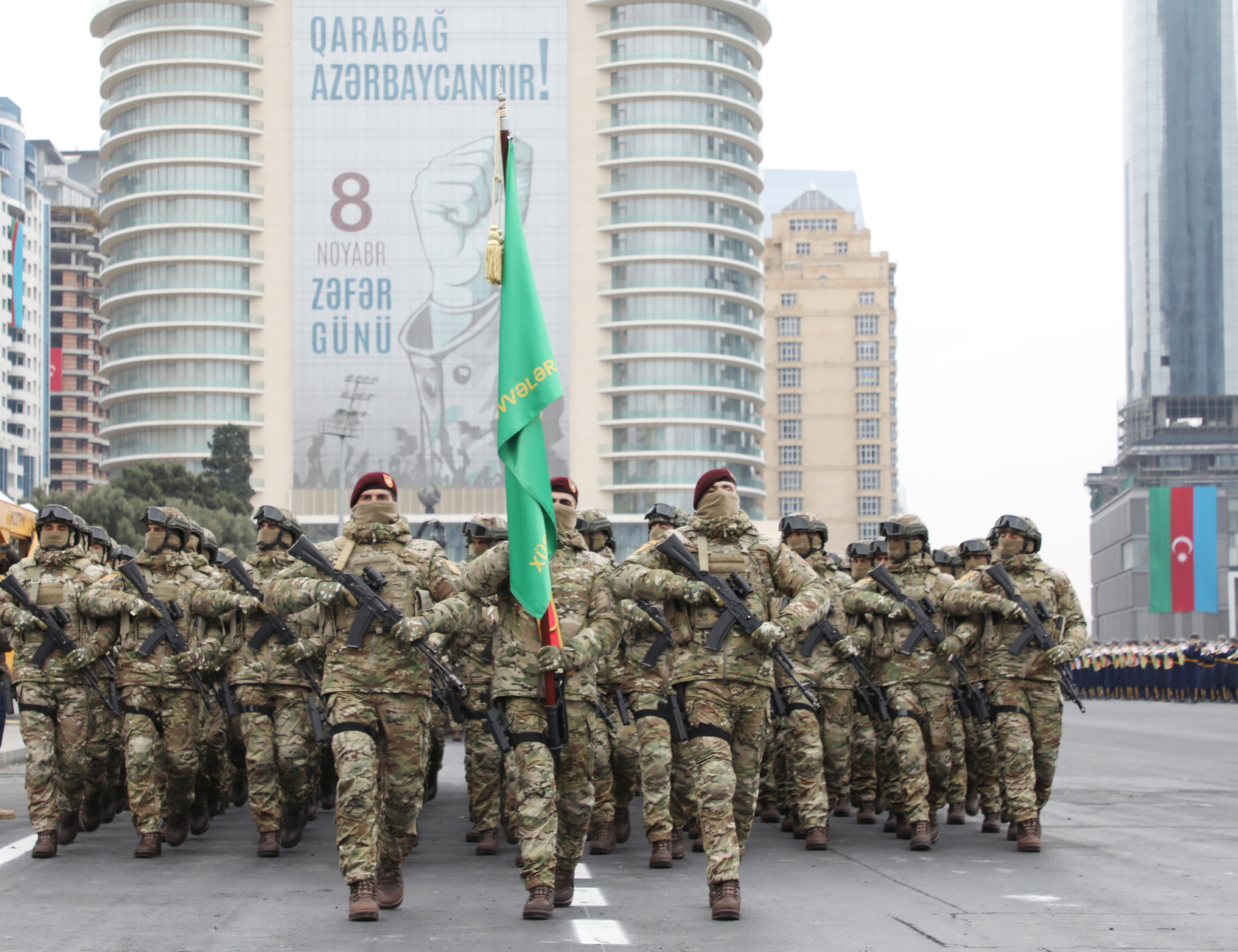
Personnel of the Special Forces of the Ministry of Defense.

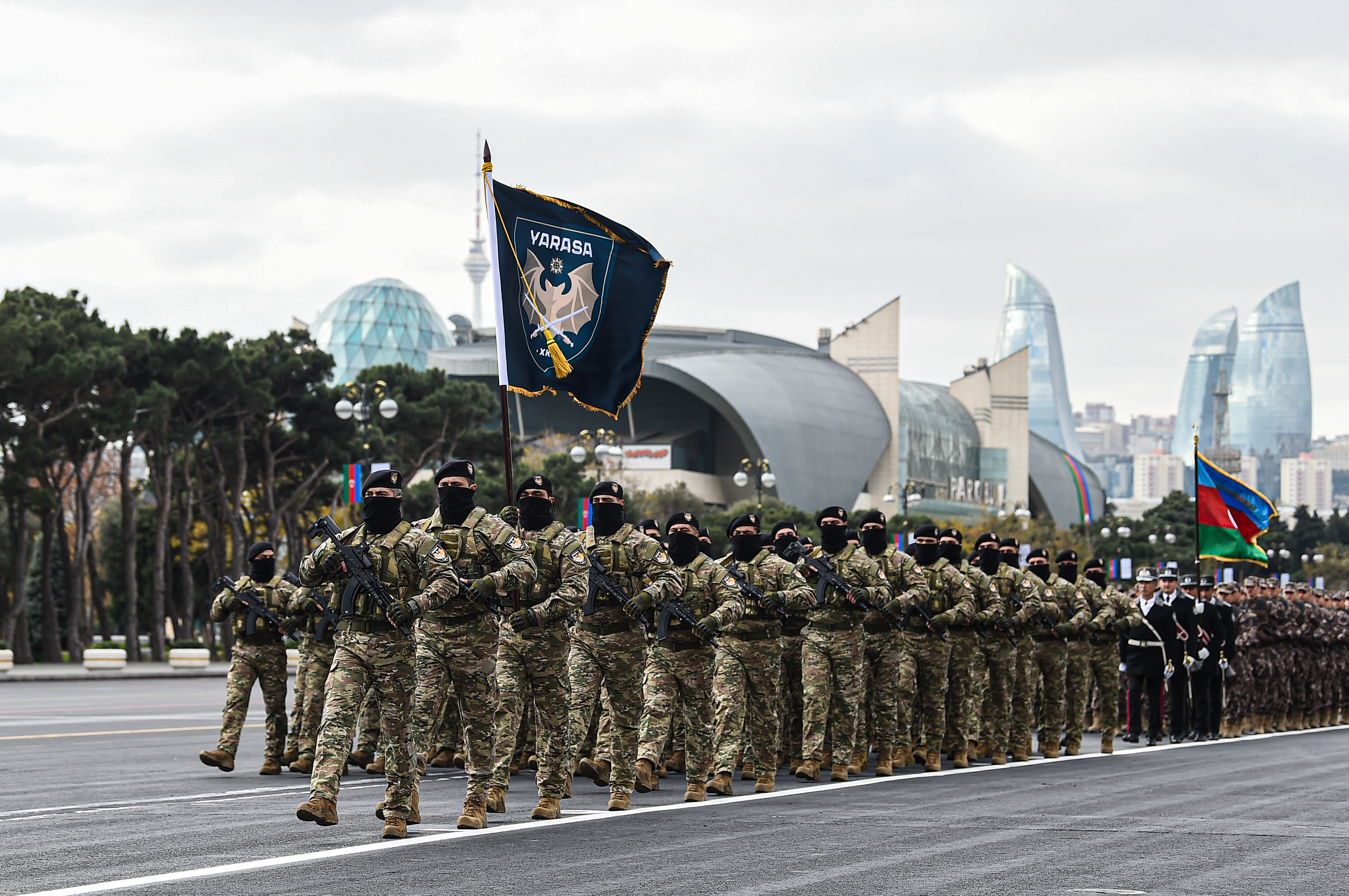
Personnel of the YARASA Special Forces of the Foreign Intelligence Service of Azerbaijan.

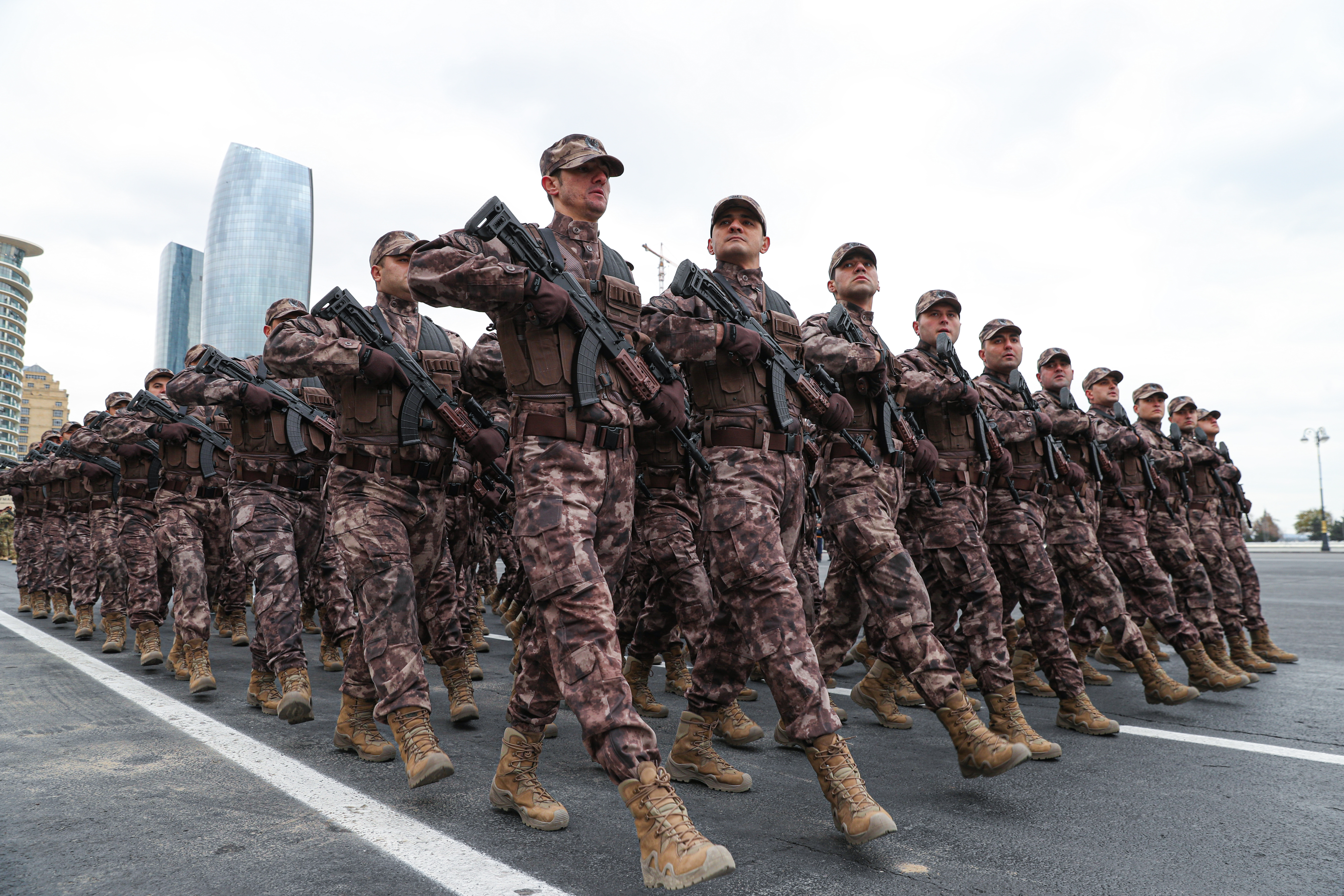
Personnel of the State Border Service of Azerbaijan.

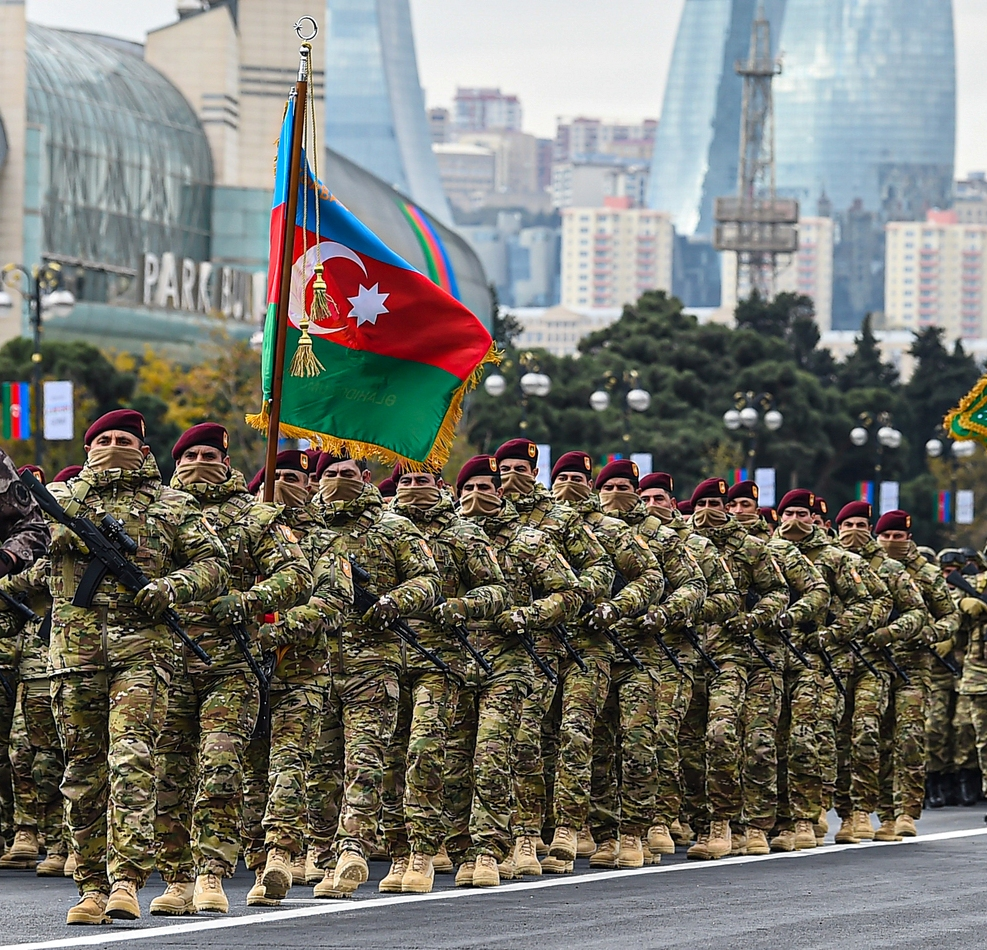
Personnel of the Special Forces of the Nakhchivan Army.

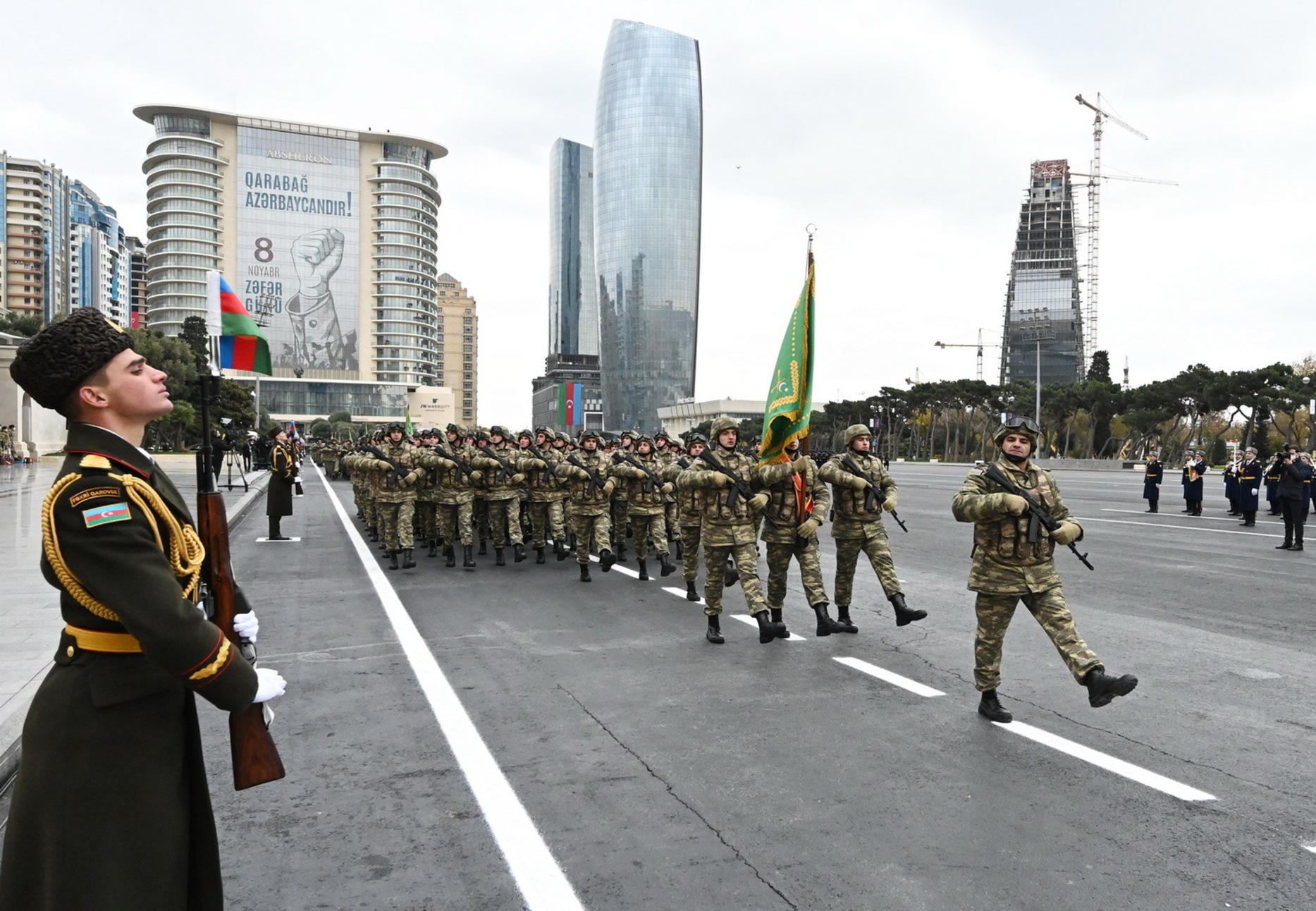
Personnel of the 1st Army Corps.

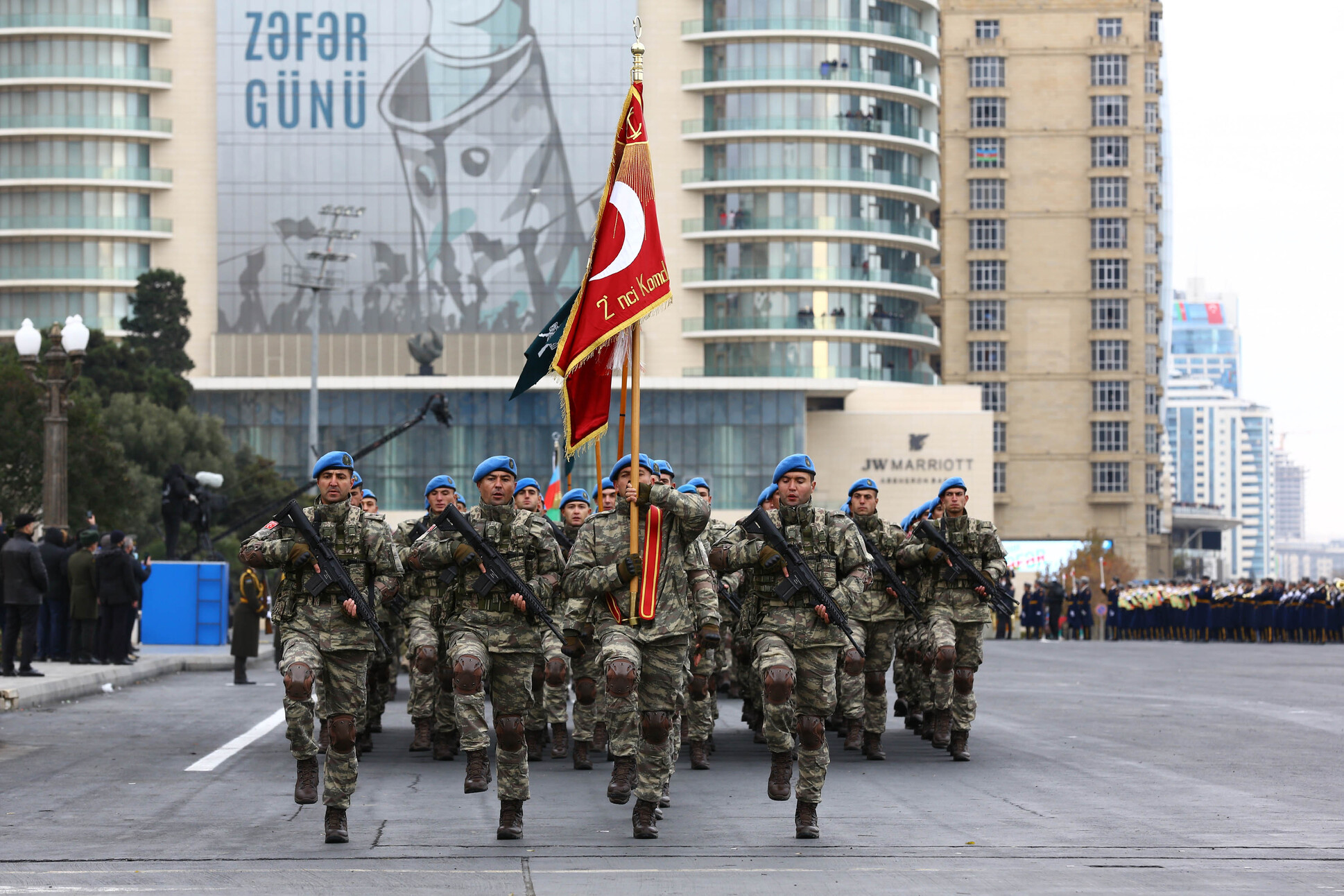
Personnel of the 2nd Commando Brigade (Turkey) blue berets.

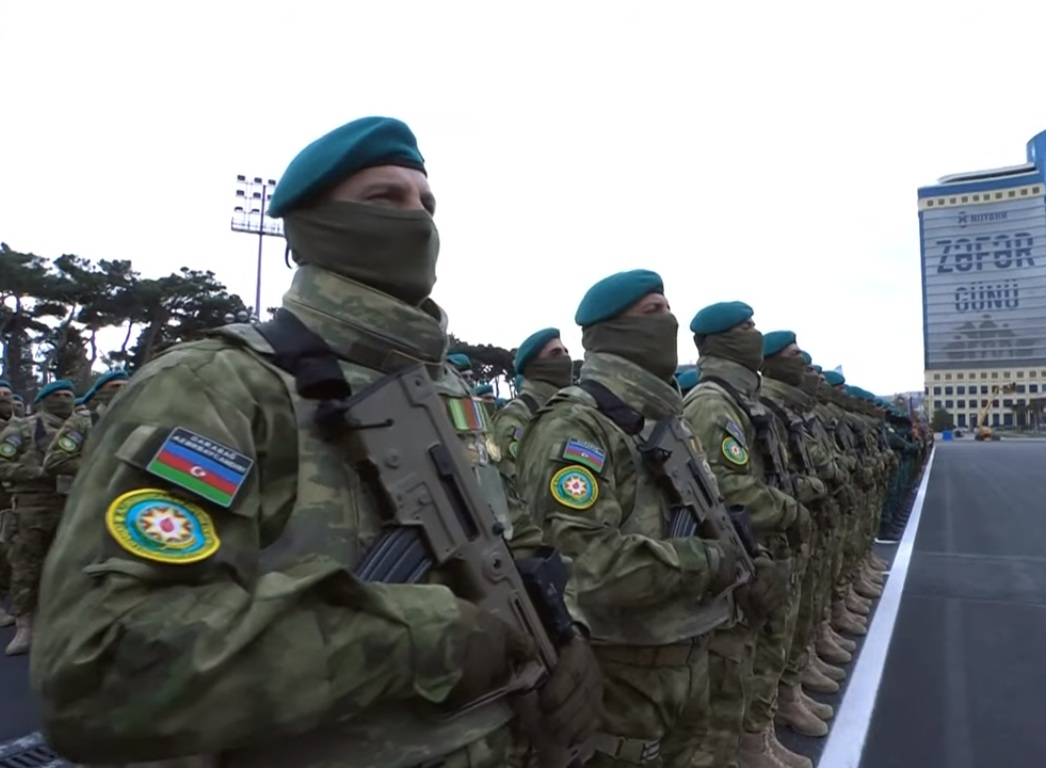
Personnel of the State Border Service of Azerbaijan.

==== Military equipment ====
About 150 vehicles, including special purpose vehicles, armored vehicles and weapons systems of the Azerbaijani Armed Forces drove past in the parade mobile column segment led by the column commander, Lieutenant General Nizam Osmanov. Orbiter-1 km, Orbiter-2B, Orbiter-3B, Orbiter-4, Aerostar-BP, Heron, Bayraktar TB2, as well as Hermes-450, Hermes-900, Guzghun and Harop unmanned aerial vehicles used by Azerbaijan during the war were also demonstrated in the parade.

Azerbaijani fighter jets and helicopters flew above Baku at the end of the parade.

==== Military trophies ====
During the parade, some of the military trophies seized from Armenians during the war, including 53 anti-tank weapons, 4 BM-30 Smerch MLRS, 97 Grad MLRS, 2 BM-27 Uragan MLRS, 1 TOS-1 MLRS, 7 S-300 SAMs, 1 S-300 radar, 2 S-300 detection stations, 1 P-14 radar, 5 Tor SAMs, 40 9K33 Osa SAMs, 4 2K12 Kub SAMs, 1 2K11 Krug SAM, 14 Zastava SAM, 2 S-125 SAMs, 22 UAVs, 2 R-17 Elbrus systems, 1 OTR-21 Tochka missile system, 2 R-142s, 1 Sky-M, and 4 Repellent electronic warfare systems. In the meanwhile, some of the destroyed and captured Armenian vehicles were also showcased, including 33 2S3 Akatsiya and 2S1 Gvozdikas, 352 various cannons, 125 mortars, 103 special-purpose vehicles, 178 grenade launchers, 5 ZSU-23-4 Shilkas, 366 tanks, 116 IFVs, 5 Sukhoi Su-25s, and over 500 military trucks were also showcased. A plaque with the license plates confiscated from the Armenian Armed Forces was also displayed at the parade, with the panel having the inscription "Karabakh is Azerbaijan!".

Military trophies

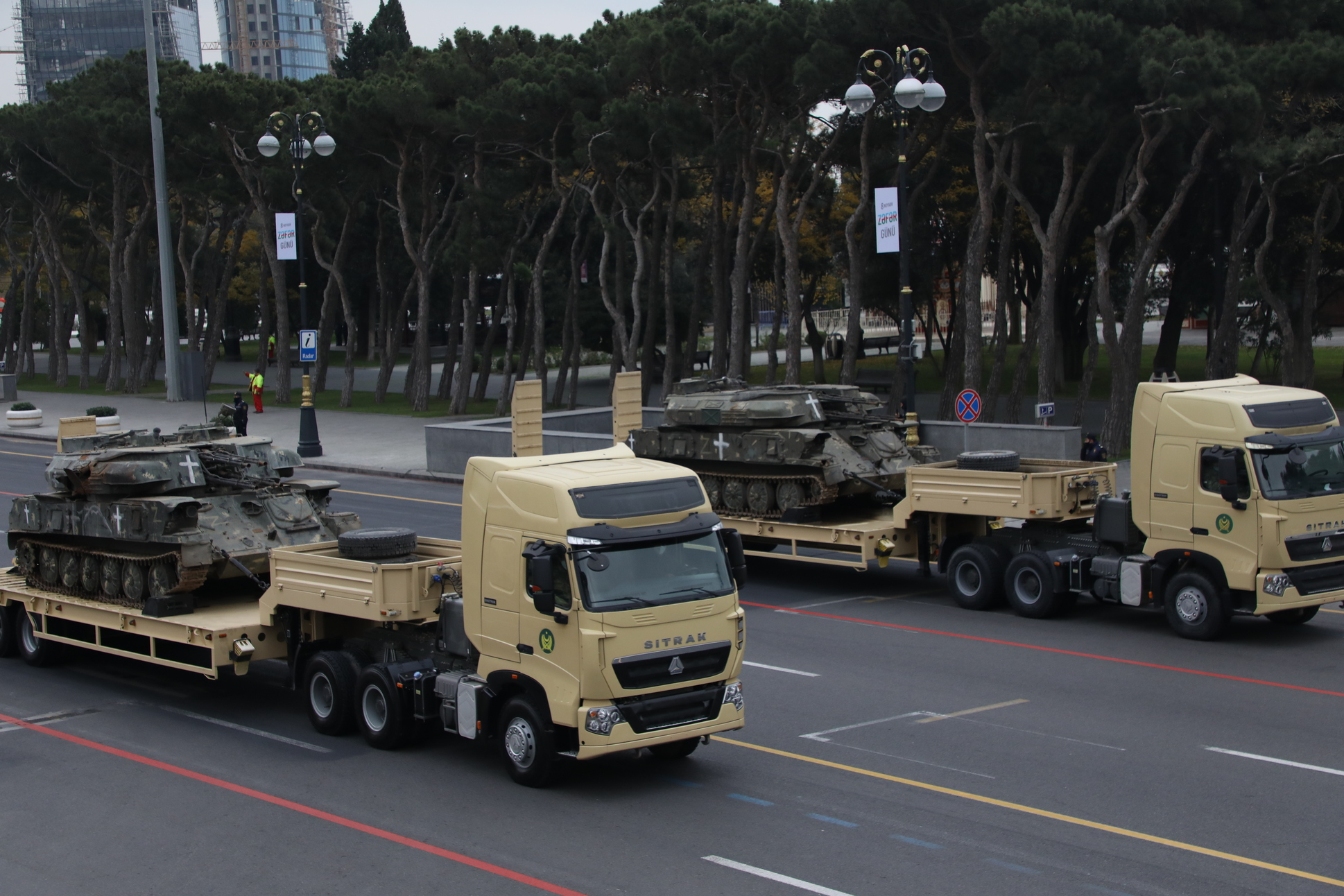
ZSU-23-4 Shilka.

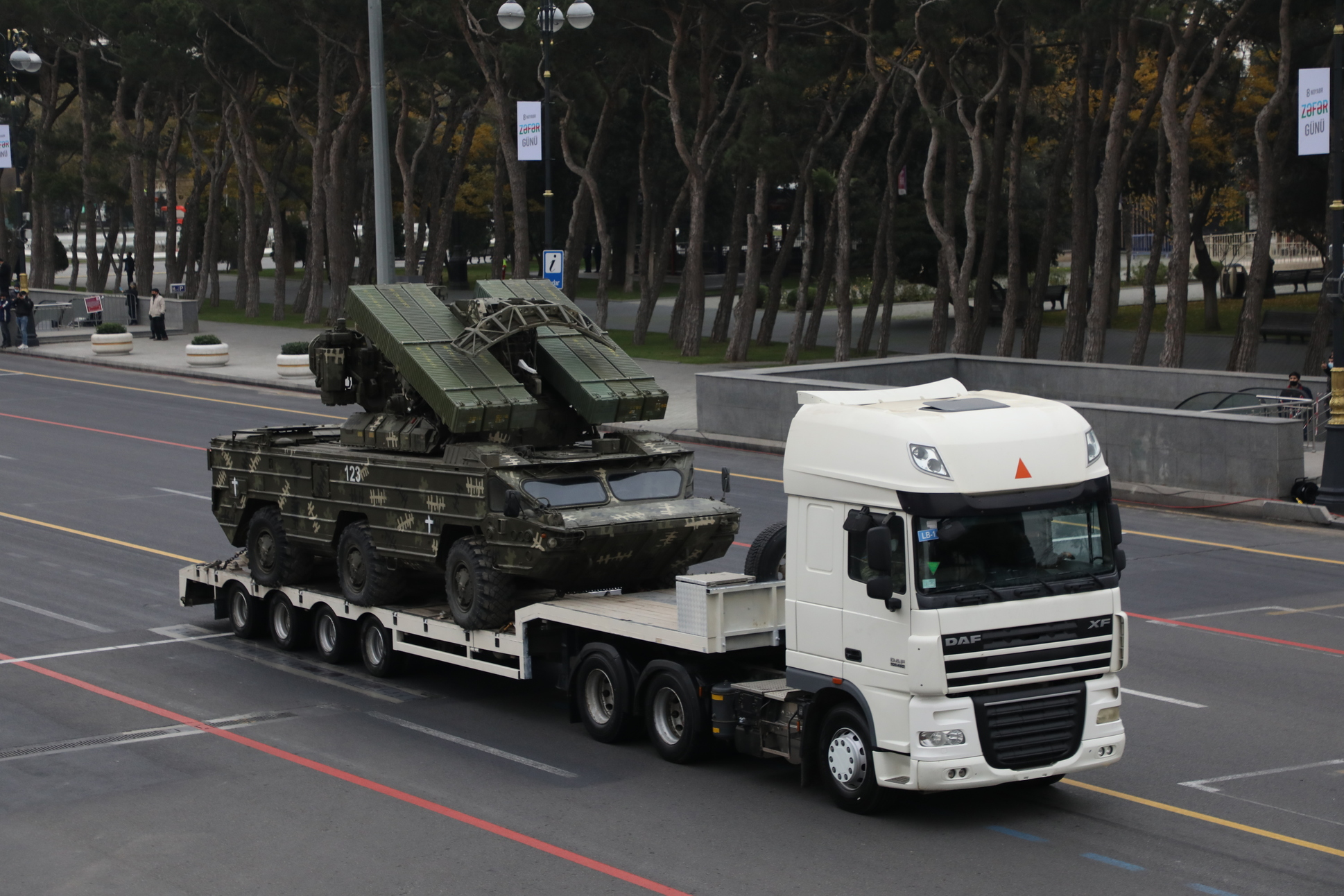
9K33 Osa.

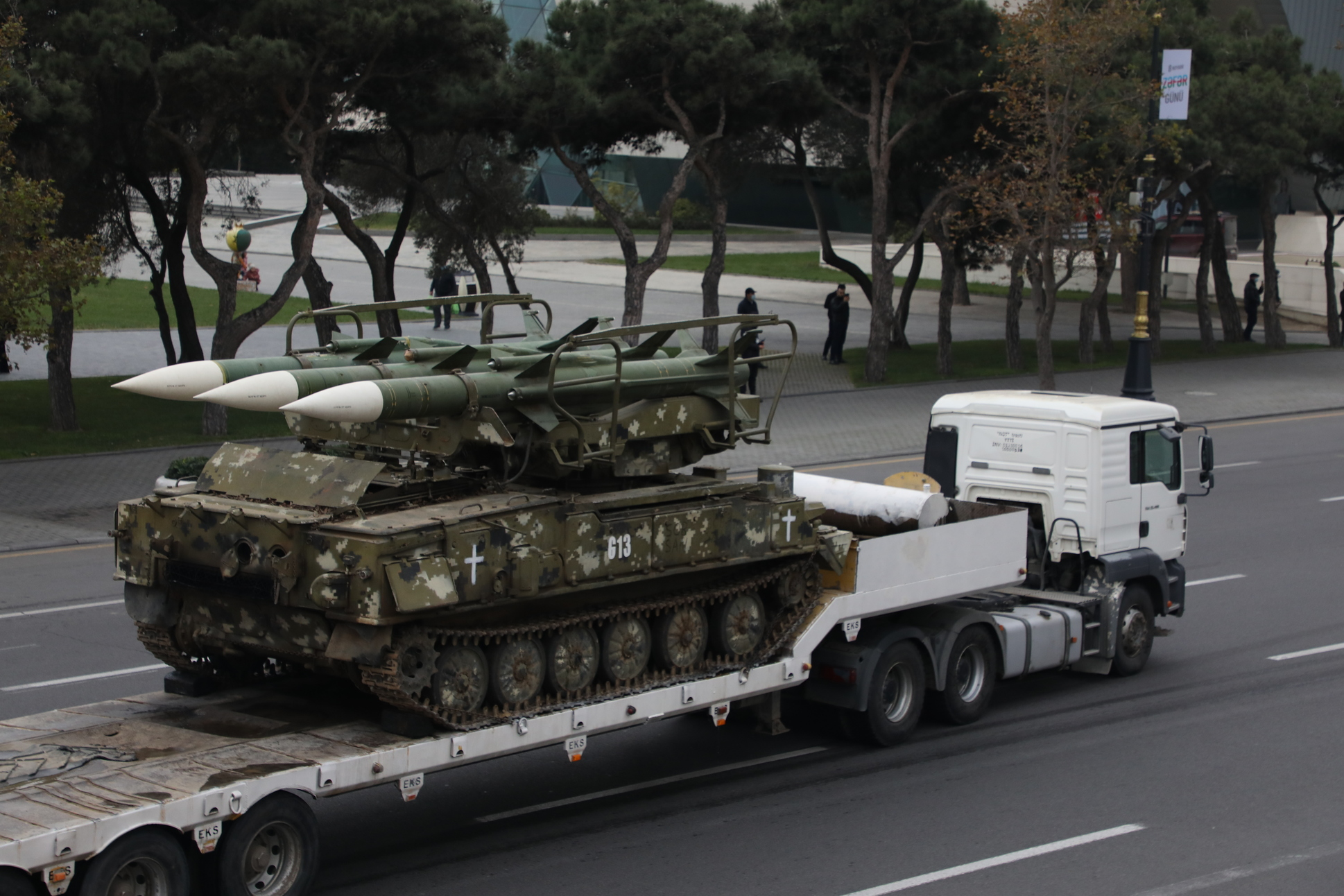
2K12 Kub.

=== Crowd ===
The military parade aroused great interest among Baku residents, who gathered in different parts of the city and tried to watch the parade closely. Despite the COVID-19 measures, Baku residents tried to go to Azadliq Square around Nizami Street and Sahil Park to watch the military parade. However, they were stopped by the police and the police officers did not allow people to enter the Baku Boulevard. Azerbaijani Defense Ministry officials said the city was not closed and people had gathered to watch the parade near the Puppet Theater. The Baku Main Police Office further noted that "necessary measures are being taken to control the event and prevent the spread of the pandemic and to prevent overcrowding in the area." There was no official warning to the population on not gathering. A BBC Azerbaijani correspondent reported that Baku residents were flocking to Azadliq Square from Neftchilar Avenue despite the fact that the parade was going to start soon. Crowds of people, waving Azerbaijani and Turkish flags, watched the parade.

== Aftermath ==
A festive fireworks display was held at the Baku Boulevard later that night.

=== Post-parade conference ===
After the parade, Ilham Aliyev and Recep Tayyip Erdoğan held a joint conference. Aliyev stated that if the Armenian government draws the "right conclusions from the war and gives up its claims, baseless claims and looks to the future, then they can have a place on a single platform". Erdoğan stressed that he supported the idea of Aliyev on building a platform with the participation of six countries, Azerbaijan, Turkey, Russia, Georgia, Iran and Armenia, and stated that such cooperation could bring peace to the region. He also added that the approaches of Vladimir Putin, the President of Russia, helped to resolve the Nagorno-Karabakh conflict in a positive way. Aliyev further noted that Turkish companies will build a road to Shusha, and when the road is ready, he will visit the city with Erdoğan. He added that along with Azerbaijani companies, Turkish companies will also participate in the construction of roads, railways and other infrastructure in the region.

The Minister of Foreign Affairs of Turkey, Mevlüt Çavuşoğlu stated that said that an agreement was signed between Azerbaijan and Turkey to simplify travel between the two countries. According to Çavuşoğlu, he signed a document with the Minister of Foreign Affairs of Azerbaijan, Jeyhun Bayramov, adding that the travel between two countries will soon be done just with ID cards.

== International reactions ==
The Turkish Ministry of National Defence, Ankara Mayor Mansur Yavaş, and Speaker of the Turkish Grand National Assembly Mustafa Şentop congratulated Azerbaijan on the parade.

Israeli opera singer Camellia Ioffe organized a concert of Azerbaijani music at the park, during which the musicians dedicated their performance to the Victory Parade in Baku.

Armenia strongly condemned Ilham Aliyev's statements on its provinces, labelling them "provocative". Also, the spokesperson for the Prime Minister of Armenia, Mane Gevorgyan stated that Erdoğan's "glorification of the ideologies of the Young Turks" was also "strongly condemnable". The Armenian ambassador to Lithuania, Latvia and Estonia Tigran Mkrtchyan called the parade a "masquerade" in response to the photograph of an Azerbaijani officer making the Grey Wolves sign during the military parade.

Russian State Duma Deputy Konstantin Zatulin called the parade "an attempt to humiliate" both Armenia and Russia and condemned the attempts of President Aliyev during his speech to draw parallels with the fight against fascism and the operation in Nagorno-Karabakh.

=== Poem controversy ===
Iranian foreign minister Mohammad Javad Zarif, in response to Erdoğan reciting a poem by Soviet Azerbaijani poet Bakhtiyar Vahabzadeh referring to the Aras River and the Iranian Azerbaijan, stated that no one was "allowed to talk about beloved Azerbaijan of Iran". Iran's former ambassador to Baku, Mohsen Pakaeen, stated that such remarks could raise historical and controversial issues between Azerbaijan and Iran, hurting their relations. Pakaeen also accused Erdoğan of spreading Pan-Turkism. Iranian authorities then summoned Turkey's ambassador to Tehran, and asked for an immediate explanation.

== See also ==
- Military Trophy Park (Baku)
- Berlin Victory Parade of 1945
- Moscow Victory Parade of 1945
