= 2nd Commando Brigade (Turkey) =

Commando brigade in Turkish Land Forces

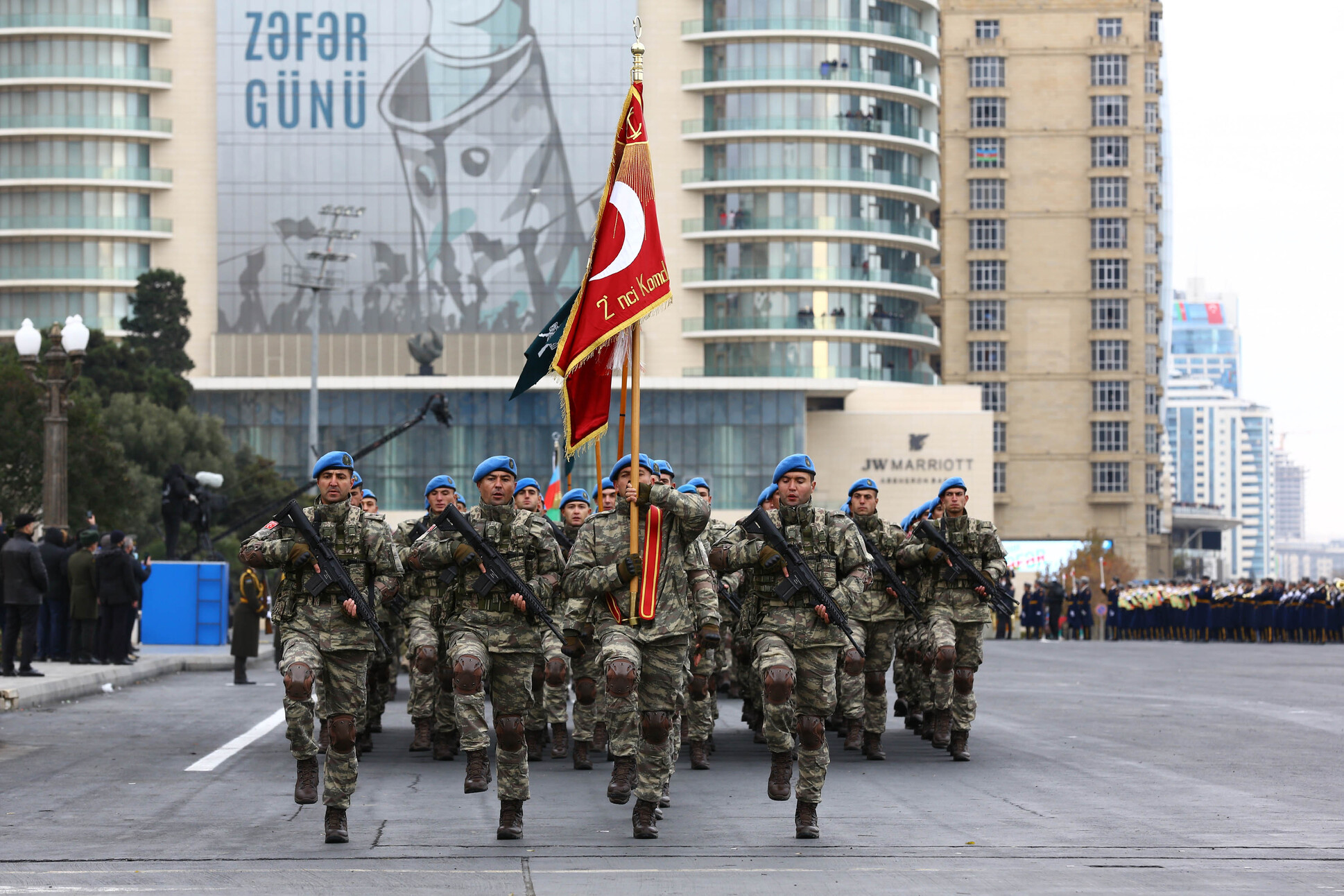
- Personnel of the 2nd Commando Brigade (Turkey) blue berets with Brigade flag.
- Country: Turkey
- Allegiance: Turkish Army
- Branch: Army
- Type: Infantry
- Size: Brigade
- Part of: 4th Corps
- Garrison/HQ: Bolu
- Nickname(s): "Legendary Brigade"
- Mascot(s): Scorpion
- Engagements: Turkish invasion of Cyprus; Kurdish-Turkish conflict
- Decorations: Turkish Armed Forces Medal of Distinguished Courage and Self-Sacrifice

Commanders
- Current commander: Brigadier General Dündar Şahin Güngör
- Notable commanders: Eşref Bitlis

The 2nd Commando Brigade is one of the 12 brigades designated commando in Turkish Land Forces. It's under the 4th Corps and is headquartered at Bolu. The unit was involved in the Turkish invasion of Cyprus. Part of the brigade is currently based on Hatay Province, to support a potential Turkish military operation in Syria.

== History ==
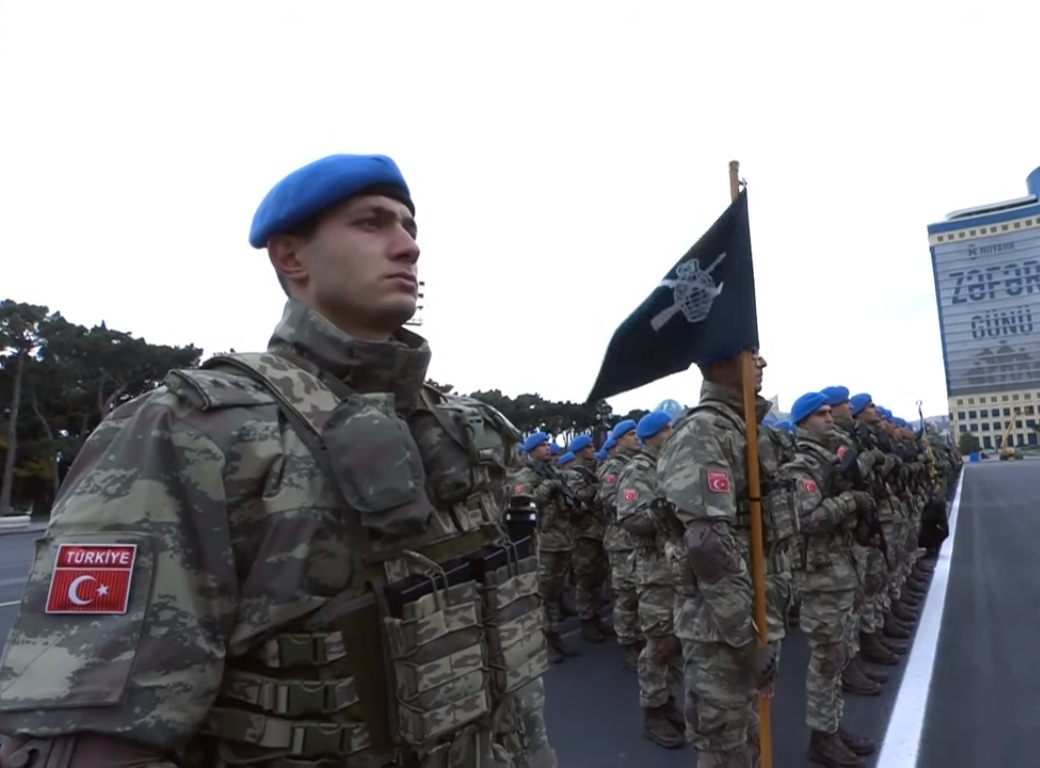
2nde Commando Brigade units at the Victory Parade 2020 in Baku

The brigade was firstly involved in the Turkish invasion of Cyprus. With the 1st Commando Brigade and Amphibious Marine Brigade, it was involved in battle of Kyrenia, which resulted in Turkish takeover of the city. After the invasion, brigade was awarded with Turkish Armed Forces Medal of Distinguished Courage and Self-Sacrifice.

It was awarded with its second Turkish Armed Forces Medal of Distinguished Courage and Self-Sacrifice for its involvement in the conflict against the Kurdistan Workers' Party (PKK).

In 2010, the brigade was fully professionalized. The brigade participated in the 2020 Baku Victory Parade on Freedom Square alongside the Azerbaijani Armed Forces after the Azerbaijani victory in the 2020 Nagorno-Karabakh war.

== See also ==
- List of commando units#Turkey
- Operation Atilla
