= Bakhtiyar Vahabzadeh =

Azerbaijani poet and dramatist (1925–2009)

- Bəxtiyar Mahmud oğlu Vahabzadə
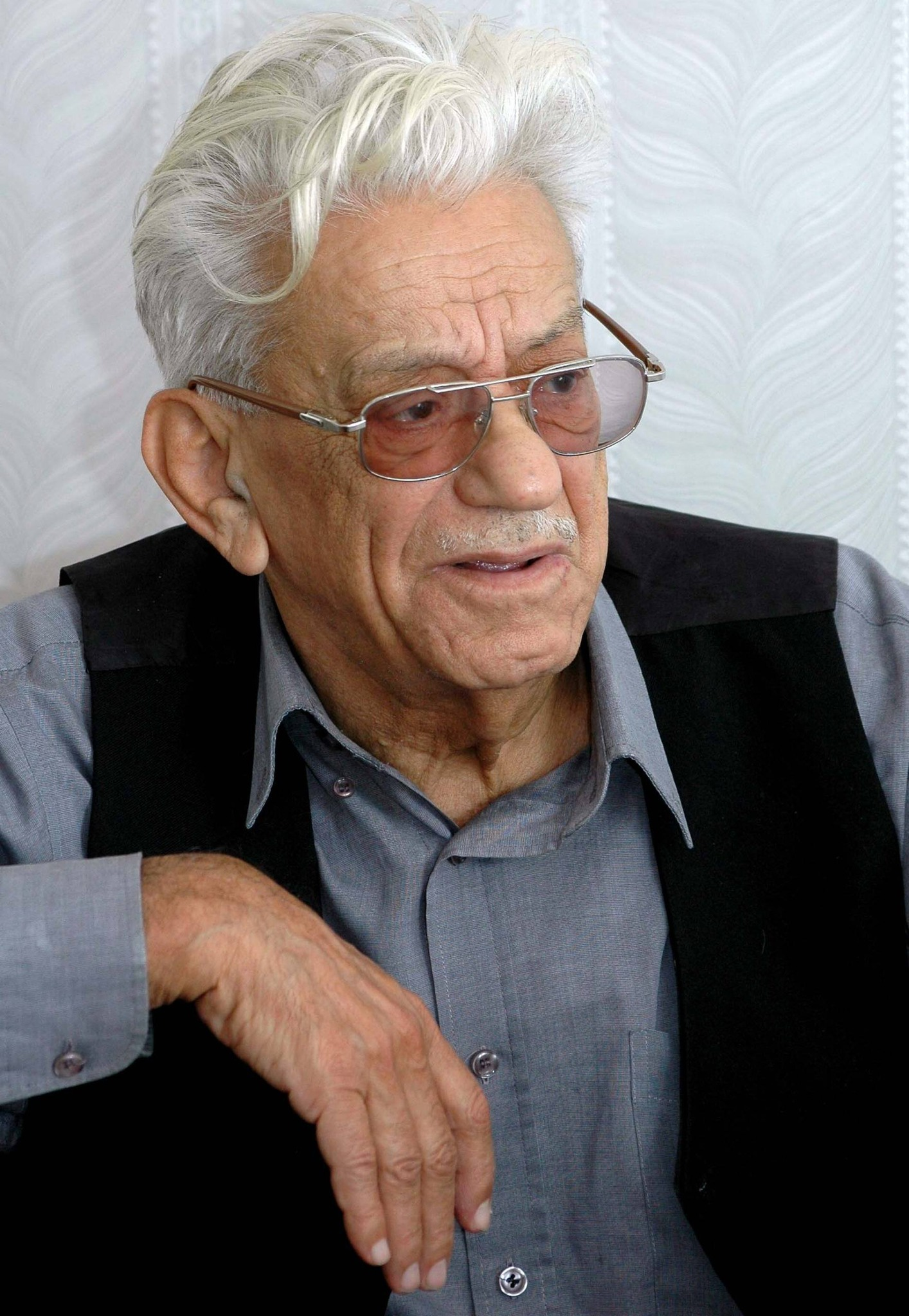
- Bust of Vahabzadeh in Shaki, Azerbaijan, 2019
- Born: August 16, 1925; Nukha, Azerbaijan SSR, Soviet Union
- Died: February 13, 2009 (aged 83); Baku, Azerbaijan
- Education: Baku State University
- Occupations: Poet; dramatist; lyricist; translator; professor; politician
- Children: 3

Signature
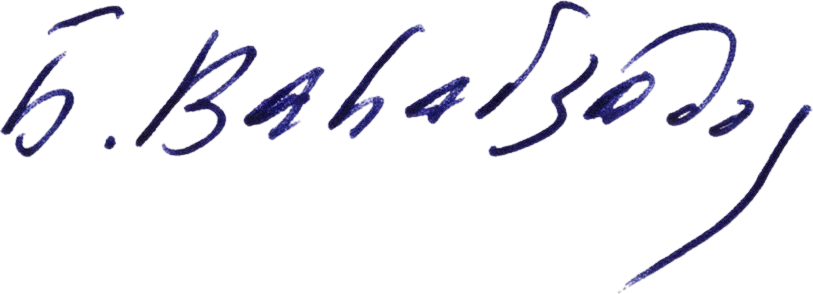

Bakhtiyar Mahmud oghlu Vahabzadeh (Azerbaijani: Bəxtiyar Mahmud oğlu Vahabzadə; August 16, 1925 – February 13, 2009) was an Azerbaijani poet, dramatist, lyricist, translator, professor, and politician. He is often regarded as one of the greatest contemporary poets of the Republic of Azerbaijan.

== Early and personal life ==
Vahabzadeh was born in 1925 in Nukha, where his bust now stands in a central square. With his family, he moved to Baku in 1934, and later studied philology at Azerbaijan State University. He would remain there as a professor until 1990, except for a brief period between 1962 and 1964, when he was expelled for nationalist leanings. During that time, he survived dire poverty by selling his wife's jewellery. They had three children, Gulzar, Isfandiyar, and Azer. Isfandiyar was named Azerbaijan's ambassador to Belarus. Vahabzadeh died in Baku on February 13, 2009, aged 83. His memorial celebration was attended by the President of Azerbaijan.

== Career ==
Vahabzadeh presented his doctoral thesis on the Azerbaijani poet Samed Vurgun in 1951. In 1952, afraid that his anti-Stalin sentiments and critical sentiments towards certain elements of the Soviet system after World War II would be discovered, he destroyed the majority of his early poetic works, albeit keeping just a small sample by hiding the manuscripts in his mother's prosthetic leg.

Over his career he wrote on numerous themes, notably Azerbaijan, family, nature, language and freedom. For years, his articles and poems appeared in the Turkish review magazine Türk Edebiyatı, having gained acclaim in Turkey for Yel Kaya'dan Ne Aparır? (What Does the Wind Steal from the Stone?), an article published in the Turkish literary magazine Varlık that set out to answer critics of the medieval Azerbaijani poet Fuzuli.

Vahabzadeh won the state prize of the Azerbaijan SSR as an honoured arts worker in 1974, won the state award for the whole Soviet Union in 1984, and was named People's Poet a year later. In 2002, Vahabzadeh received the Commodore Medal from the Romanian Ministry of Culture for his poetry book titled Benim Garibim (My Poor).

=== Poetry ===
Among his best known long verses, Yollar-Oğullar (Roads-Sons) was dedicated to the Algerian Independence Movement, and the Mugam celebrated Azerbaijan's best known composer Üzeyir Hacıbeyli. Many of Vahabzade's works had a political edge that purported to criticise inadequacies of the USSR's Western enemies, while in fact having underlying resonances with problems back home. Thus, Latin Dili (Latin Language, 1967), written in reaction to a visit to Morocco, noted how local people, like Azerbaijanis in the USSR, were forced to use a non-native language (i.e. French rather than Arabic). Latin Dili thereupon highlights the irony that elsewhere there's a language (Latin) that remains widely used despite no longer belonging to any living culture. This nearly got Vahabzadeh in trouble with the KGB, but it could not be proven that the poem's subtext was Azerbaijan, not Morocco as he claimed. In a similar vein, the 1972 poem Dawn examined the USA's McCarthy-era attacks on pacifist scientist Linus Pauling while unspokenly reflecting a similar sense of political paranoia in the Soviet Union.

Other well-known poetic works and collections include:

- Mənim Dostlarım (My Friends, 1949)
- Bahar (Spring, 1950)
- Dostlug Nağmesi (Book of Friendship, 1953)
- Ebedî Heykel (Eternal Statue, 1954)
- Çınar (Plane Tree, 1956)
- Sadə Adamlar (Plain Men, 1956)
- Ceyran (Currency, 1957)
- Aylı Geceler (Nights at Moon, 1958)
- Şairin Kitaphanası (Library of a Poet, 1961)
- E'tiraf (Confession, 1962)
- İnsan ve Zaman (Man and Time, 1964)
- Seçilmiş Eserler (Selected Works, 1967)
- Kökler-Budağlar (Roots and Branches, 1968)
- Deniz-Sahil (Sea-Coast, 1969)
- Bindörtyüzonaltı (Fourteen sixteen, 1970)
- Dam Yeri (On the Roof, 1974)
- Seçilmiş Eserleri (Selected Works, 2 volumes, 1975)
- Yücelikte Tenhalık (Tranquility in Eminence, 1998)
- Benim Garibim (My Strange, 2002)

==== Controversy ====
Vahabzadeh's poem Gülüstan was written in 1959. It laments how the Aras River has separated Azerbaijani-speaking people in the Azerbaijan SSR of the Soviet Union and Iran and is a symbol of the pan-Turkism doctrine, that seeks incorporation of the Turkic people of Iran. The poem is part of a literary genre conceived in the Azerbaijan SSR of the Soviet Union, the context of which is related to Iran's Azerbaijan region. This Soviet Azerbaijani literary genre, also referred to as "a literature of longing", had become dominant in the 1950s and 1960s in the Azerbaijan SSR. As a rule, works that belonged to this category, as the historian and political scientist Zaur Gasimov explains, "were examples of blatant Azerbaijani nationalism stigmatizing the “division" of the nation along the river Araxes, as well as denunciations of economic and cultural exploitation of Iranian Azerbaijanis, etc." Such themes, including the poem by Vahabzadeh, were incorporated into the history and literature curricula of the Azerbaijan SSR. Gasimov adds: "An important by-product of this literary genre was strongly articulated anti-Iranian rhetoric. Tolerance and even support of this anti-Iranian rhetoric by the communist authorities were obvious." Vahabzadeh, for instance, was decorated on numerous occasions by the ruling communist authorities for his works which were incorporated into school curriculum in the Azerbaijan SSR.

=== Plays ===
His best known plays include İkinci Ses (The Second Sound, 1991), Yağışdan Sonra (After the Rain), Artığ Adam (Waste Man) and Vicdan (Conscience).

Several works including İkinci Ses have been translated into Turkish by Yavuz Bulent Bakiler. Others include:

- Feryat (Cry, in verse)
- Nereye Gidiyor Bu Dünya (Where is the World Going, 1991)
- Özümüzü Kesen Kılıç-Göktürkler (The Sword on Our Way-Göktürk tribe, 1998; staged by the State Theater, Şinasi Hall, 2000–2001).
- Reqabet

=== Translations ===
Vahabzadeh translated into Azerbaijani as Abydos gəlini, Lord Byron's 1813 work Bride of Abydon inspired by travels in Turkey. Vahabzadeh's own poems have been translated into many languages in the Soviet Union as well as into many Turkic languages and into German, French and Persian.

== Activism ==
For nearly 40 years, from 1951 until retirement in 1990, Vahabzadeh worked at Azerbaijan State University as a professor of "Contemporary Azerbaijani Literature", albeit with a two year gap. In 1980, he became both a member of the Azerbaijani Academy of Sciences and a deputy of the Milli Majlis (parliament) of the Azerbaijan SSR. His rise in the political ranks of Soviet Azerbaijan was aided by penning titles such as his 1976 Leninlə Sohbet, but politically he had long been a noted nationalist, suffering a two-year expulsion from his university for publishing the 1959 poem Gulustan. Vahabzadeh is cited as one of the figures of the Azerbaijani intelligentsia whose pronouncements in 1988 contributed to the rising tensions between the Azerbaijani and Armenian populations of Shamakhi District that led eventually to the Kərkənc village swap. Having been deputy of the Supreme Soviet of the Republic of Azerbaijan since 1980, Vahabzadeh continued his parliamentary duties following independence gaining election to Azerbaijan's national parliament in 1995 and again in 2000. On April 15, 1995, Vahabzadeh was awarded with the prestigious Istiglal Order for his contributions to the national independence movement of Azerbaijan by the then President of Azerbaijan Heydar Aliyev.

Bəxtiyar Vahabzadə küç, a major street in Baku's Yasamal district, is named after Vahabzadeh, as is a high school in the Turkish city of Adana. and parks in both Konya and Ankara. A street in Belgrade, Serbia connecting the neighborhoods of Banjica and Miljakovac is named "Ulica Bahtijara Vagabzade". It has its own eBird hotspot page.

Vahabzadeh accused Iranian Azerbaijani professor Yahya Zoka of being a "traitor to his ancestors and sons" due to him being supportive of Iranian nationalism.

== See also ==
- Erdoğan Iran poem controversy
