= Orkhan Sultanov =

Chief of Foreign Intelligence Service of the Republic of Azerbaijan

Orkhan Sultanov Orxan Sultanov
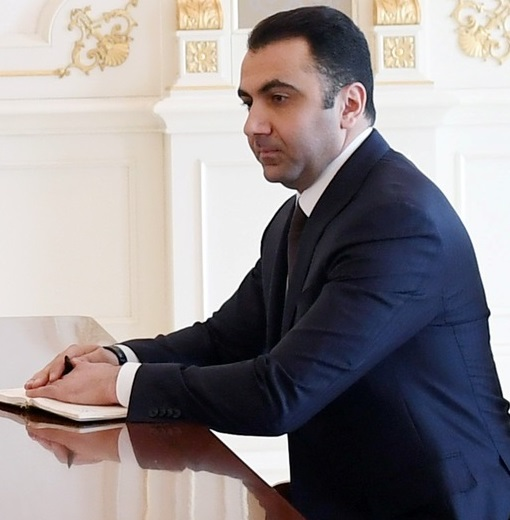

Chief of the Foreign Intelligence Service of the Republic of Azerbaijan
- Incumbent
- Assumed office 14 December 2015
- President: Ilham Aliyev
- Preceded by: Position established

Personal details
- Born: 1977 (age 48–49) Baku, Azerbaijan SSR, USSR
- Awards

Military service
- Rank: Colonel General

Orkhan Sadyar oghlu Sultanov (Azerbaijani: Orxan Sedyar oğlu Sultanov, 1977) is a colonel general and the Chief of the Foreign Intelligence Service of the Republic of Azerbaijan.

== Biography ==
Orkhan Sultanov was born in 1977 in Baku. He previously worked at the Ministry of Foreign Affairs of Azerbaijan. In 2007–2011, he served as First Secretary for Humanitarian Affairs of the Azerbaijani Embassy in the United Kingdom. After the Ministry of Foreign Affairs, he worked at the Foreign Intelligence Department of the Ministry of National Security of Azerbaijan.

By the order of the President of the Republic of Azerbaijan dated 14 December 2015, Orkhan Sultanov was appointed Chief of the Foreign Intelligence Service of the Republic of Azerbaijan.

== Awards and ranks ==
=== Ranks ===
- Major General — 17 March 2016
- Lieutenant General — 27 March 2019
- Colonel General — 7 December 2020

=== Awards ===
- 2nd degree "For service to the Fatherland" order — 26 March 2018
- "Zafar" order
