= Orders, decorations, and medals of Northern Cyprus =

The orders, decorations, and medals of Northern Cyprus refer to the civil and military awards and decorations presented by the Government of the Turkish Republic of Northern Cyprus. These awards are governed under the Medals and Orders Law No. 56/2000.

The state decorations of Northern Cyprus include:

- State Medal of Honor (Turkmen: Devlet Şeref Madalyası): Conferred upon the proposal of the Prime Minister of Northern Cyprus for services to the state.
- National Struggle Medal (Turkmen: Milli Mücadele Madalyası): Conferred to veterans and families of participants of the Turkish invasion of Cyprus.

== See also ==
- Orders, decorations, and medals of Turkey
