= Dzyunashogh =

Dzyunashogh Ձյունաշող
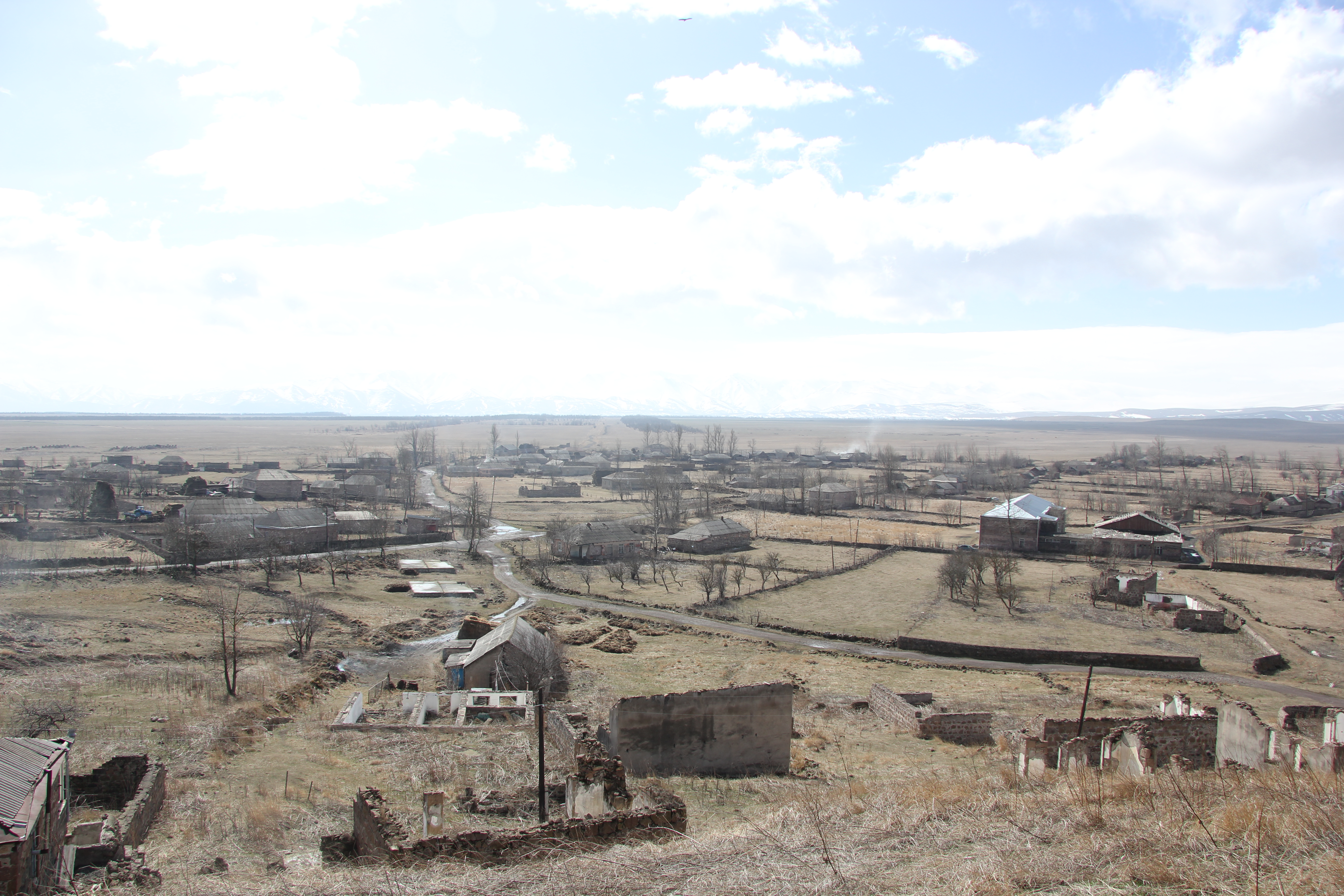

- Location within Armenia
- Coordinates: 41°10′46″N 44°10′52″E
- Country: Armenia
- Province: Lori
- Elevation: 1,590 m (5,220 ft)

Population (2011)
  - Total: 177
- Time zone: UTC+4 (AMT)

Dzyunashogh (Armenian: Ձյունաշող) is a village in the Lori Province of Armenia, near the Armenia–Georgia border.

== History ==
Between May and July 1989, the Azerbaijani population of the village was subject to a population exchange with the Armenian population of the village of Karkanj in Azerbaijan.
