= Victory Banner (Azerbaijan) =

Azerbaijanian war banner

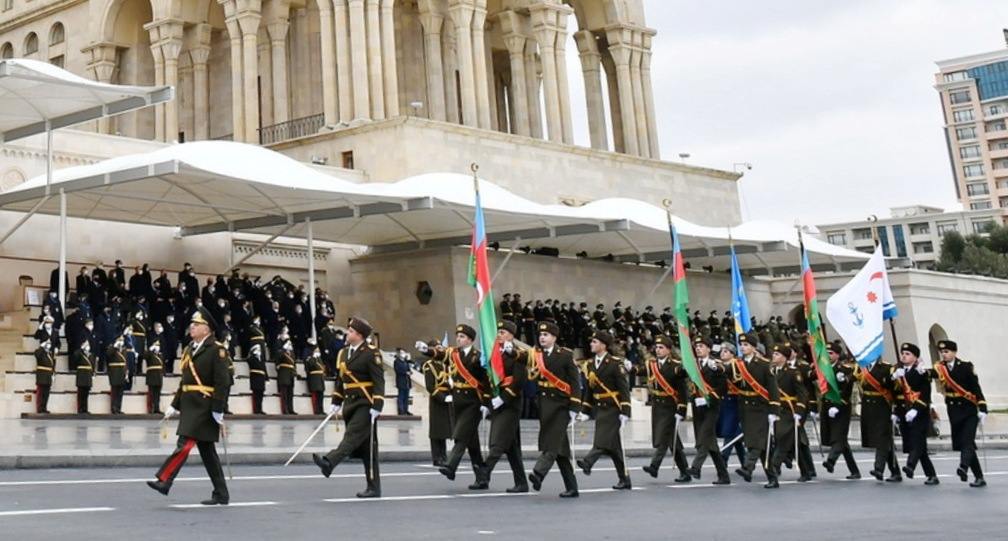
The Banner of Victory in the Baku Victory Parade of 2020

The Victory Banner (Azerbaijani: Zəfər bayrağı) of Azerbaijan is the banner raised by the servicemen of the Azerbaijani Armed Forces over the building of the Shusha City Executive Power on 8 November 2020, after a three-day-long battle over the city. The Victory Banner is the official symbol of the Victory of the Azerbaijani people against separatists during 2020 Nagorno-Karabakh war.

== Events with the banner ==
The Banner of Victory was displayed in the Victory Parade of 2020. The Banner of Victory, the main symbol of Azerbaijan's victory in the Second Karabakh War, was brought to the square during a military parade by a group led by the Hero of the Patriotic War, Major General Zaur Mammadov, who was appointed the city's first commandant after the liberation of Shusha.

The banner is currently kept at the Ministry of Defense. It will be demonstrated at the Patriotic War Memorial Complex and Victory Museum to be established by the Order of the President of the Republic of Azerbaijan Ilham Aliyev dated 3 December 2020.

== See also ==
- Victory Banner (Soviet Union)
- Flag of Azerbaijan
