= Foreign Intelligence Service (Azerbaijan) =

Intelligence service of Azerbaijan

Foreign Intelligence Service of Azerbaijan
- Azərbaycan Respublikasının Xarici Kəşfiyyat Xidməti
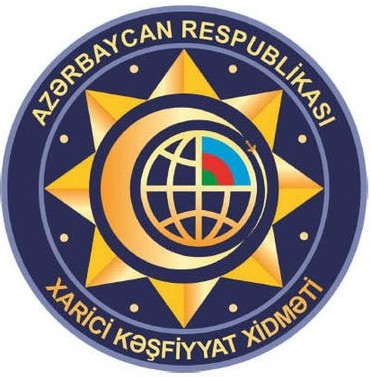

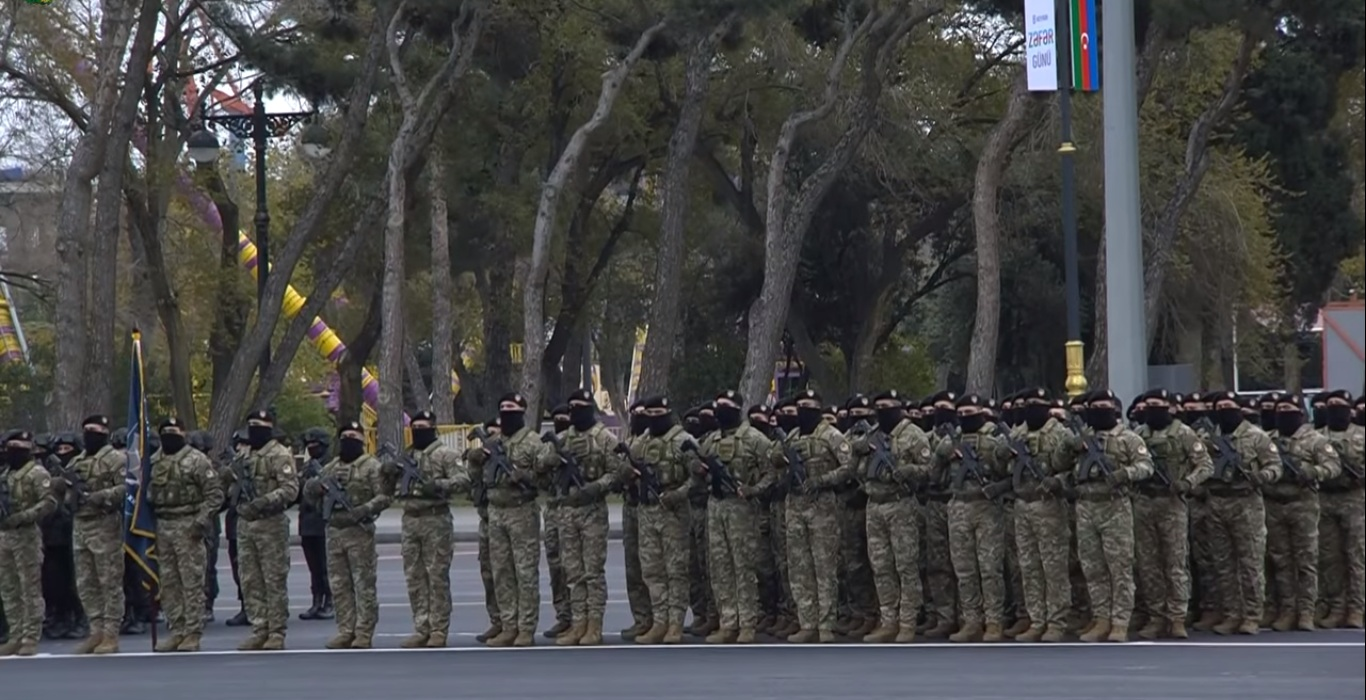
- Servicemen of the YARASA Special Forces of the Foreign Intelligence Service at the Baku Victory Parade of 2020.

Agency overview
- Formed: December 14, 2015
- Preceding agency: Ministry of National Security
- Headquarters: Baku, Azerbaijan
- Agency executive: Colonel general Orkhan Sultanov, Chief
- Website: http://fis.gov.az

The Foreign Intelligence Service of Azerbaijan (Azerbaijani: Azərbaycan Respublikasının Xarici Kəşfiyyat Xidməti) is one of the special services of Azerbaijan. The main goal of the Foreign Intelligence Service is to increase the effectiveness of the activities of special services, as well as to improve the structure of the state administration. The head of the Foreign Intelligence Service is Colonel General Orkhan Sultanov.

== History ==
The service was established by decree of the President of Azerbaijan, Ilham Aliyev, dated December 14, 2015, to replace the Ministry of National Security and help the Azerbaijan Armed Forces in a future war against Armenia. Resolution number 360, "On Amendments to Certain Resolutions of the Cabinet of Ministers of the Republic of Azerbaijan" was adopted by the Cabinet of Ministers in September 2016. The former Ministry of National Security was divided into two state services, "State Security Service" and "Foreign Intelligence Service". President Ilham Aliyev signed a decree on the establishment of the emblem of the Foreign Intelligence Service in the spring of 2017.

An order to approve the state program for improving the activities of the Foreign Intelligence Service of the Azerbaijan Republic for 2017–2021 was signed by the president in December 2017.

== Operations ==
The flag of the YARASA Special Forces

The YARASA Special Forces of the Foreign Intelligence Service took part in the Lachin offensive during the Second Nagorno-Karabakh War.

Personnel of the YARASA Special Forces also worked mainly in the rear of the Armenian Army positions, participating in taking control of a number of settlements of Azerbaijan during the hostilities. In particular, they were among the first to enter the city of Qubadli. During the Victory Parade held on 10 December on Azadliq Square, a special unit of YARASA was paraded for the first time.

== Leadership ==
=== Heads ===
- Colonel General Orkhan Sultanov (14 December 2015 – present)

=== Deputy Heads ===
- Major General Jeyhun Shadlinsky (10 March 2017 – 6 February 2020)
- Major General Samir Ismayilov (Since 12 March 2020)

== See also ==
- Special State Protection Service of Azerbaijan
- Ministry of National Security of Azerbaijan
- State Security Service of the Republic of Azerbaijan
