= Erdoğan Iran poem controversy =

Diplomatic incident between Iran and Turkey in 2020

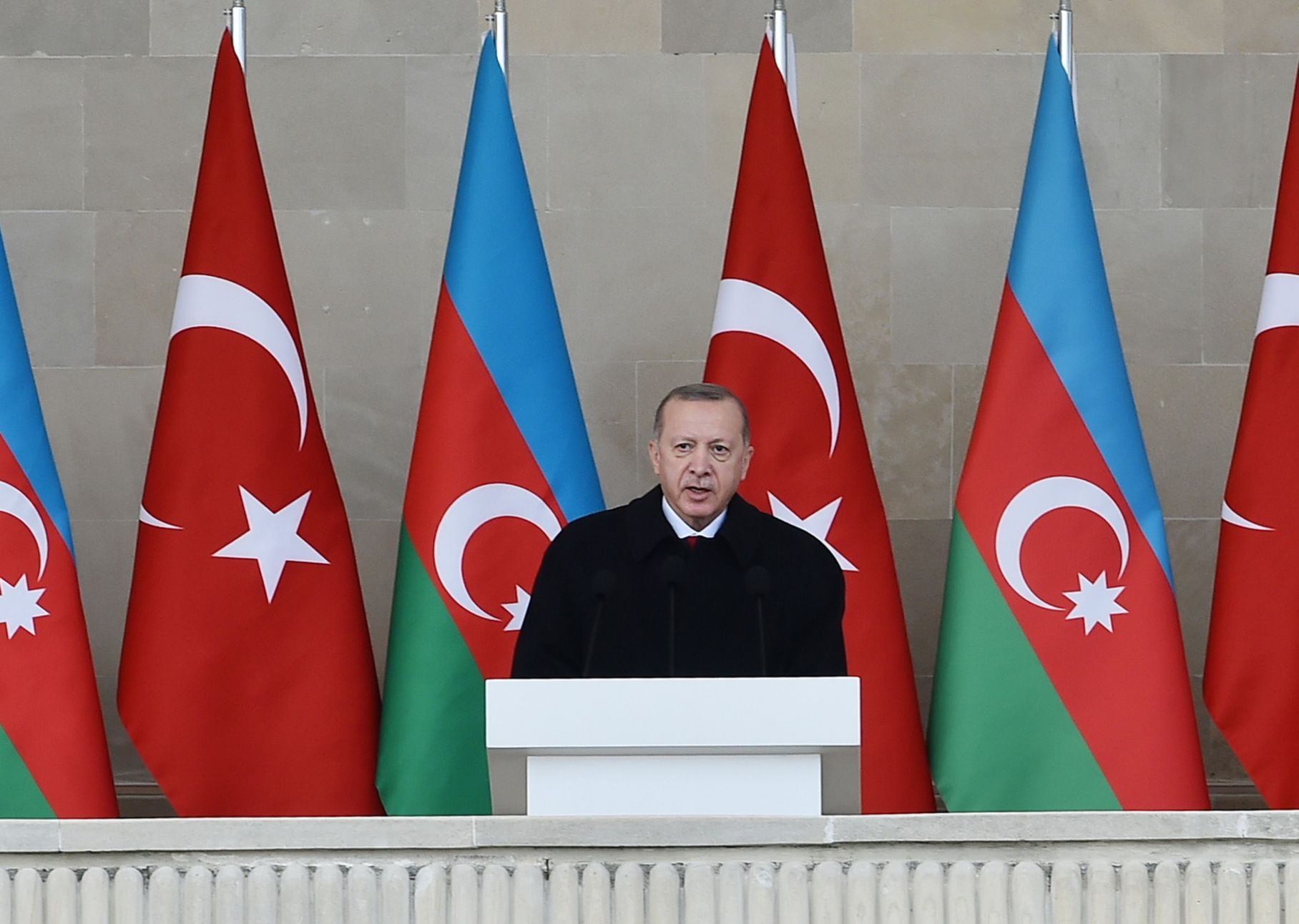
Erdoğan speaking at the Baku Victory Parade in the Republic of Azerbaijan, 10 December 2020

On 10 December 2020, Turkish president Recep Tayyip Erdoğan was attending the Baku Victory Parade in the Republic of Azerbaijan. There, he read parts of a controversial poem, which, tapping into themes of Azerbaijani irredentism and pan-Turkism, subtly suggested a territorial affinity between Iranian Azerbaijan and the Republic of Azerbaijan. The incident sparked tensions with Iran; the Iranian government denounced Erdoğan's remarks as an act of challenging Iran's sovereignty, and a number of Iranian citizens protested at Turkish diplomatic missions in their country.

Erdoğan had been in Baku to commemorate Azerbaijan's victory over Armenia in the Second Nagorno-Karabakh War, which ended when a Russia-brokered ceasefire agreement came into effect on 10 November 2020. Turkey officially denies the accusation that it supported the Azerbaijani military during the conflict.

== Incident ==
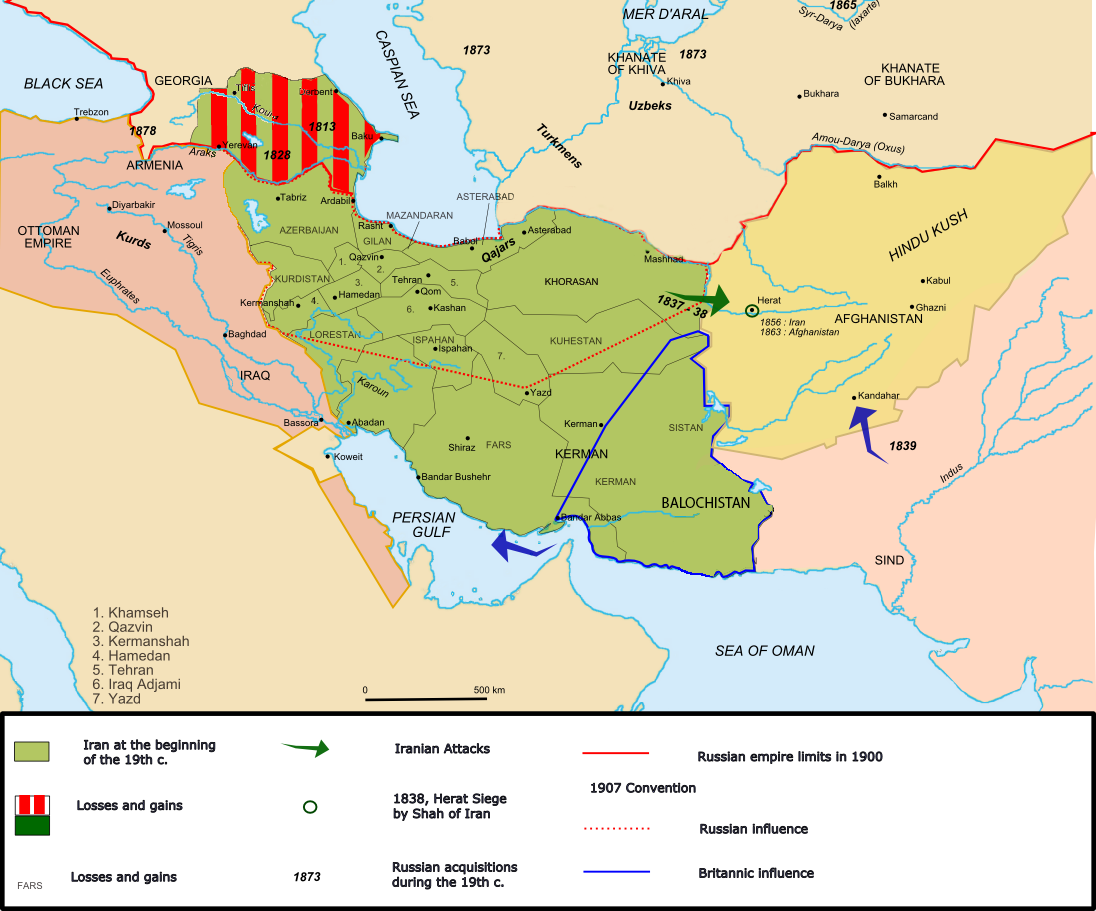
Map of Qajar Iran in 1900, including the territory that it lost to the Russian Empire, 2006

Distribution of the Azerbaijani language

=== Context ===
The poem recited by Erdoğan is called Gülüstan, and was written by the Soviet-era Azerbaijani poet Bakhtiyar Vahabzadeh. It laments how the Aras River has "separated" Azerbaijanis and is one of the symbols of pan-Turkism, seeking the cultural and political unification of the Turkic peoples, including those in Iran. The poem is part of a literary genre that was conceived in the Azerbaijan SSR of the Soviet Union, the context of which is related to Iranian Azerbaijan.

This Soviet Azerbaijani "literature of longing" had become dominant in the 1950s and 1960s. As a rule, works that belonged to this category, as the Azerbaijani historian and political scientist Zaur Gasimov explains, "were examples of blatant Azerbaijani nationalism stigmatizing the 'division' of the nation along the river Araxes, as well as denunciations of economic and cultural exploitation of Iranian Azerbaijanis, etc." Such themes, including Vahabzadeh's poem, were incorporated into the history and literature curricula of the Azerbaijan SSR. Gasimov adds: "An important by-product of this literary genre was strongly articulated anti-Iranian rhetoric. Tolerance and even support of this anti-Iranian rhetoric by the communist authorities were obvious." Vahabzadeh, for instance, was decorated on numerous occasions by the ruling communist authorities for his work, which were incorporated into the school curriculum of the Azerbaijan SSR.

=== Erdoğan's recitation ===
The section of the poem recited by Erdoğan said: "They separated the Aras River and filled it with rocks and rods. I will not be separated from you. They have separated us forcibly." In Iran, the poem brought to memory the legacy of the Treaty of Turkmenchay, which Qajar Iran was forced to sign with the Russian Empire in 1828, resulting in the former's cessation of swaths of lands in the South Caucasus to the latter. The lands ceded by the treaty, which set the boundaries between Iran and Russia at the Aras River, now constitute large parts of the Republic of Azerbaijan, Armenia, and Turkey. Due to the significance of the Russian victory, the treaty continues to be viewed as a mark of shame on Iranian history during the reign of the Turkic-origin Qajar dynasty.

== Reactions ==
=== Iran ===
After a video of Erdoğan's speech in Baku circulated online, Iranian social media was awash with angry posts that demanded a resolute response from the Iranian government. Dozens demonstrated in front of the Turkish consulate in Tabriz (one of the largest cities populated by Iranian Azerbaijanis) to protest against Erdoğan's supposed questioning of Iran's territorial integrity. Many Iranians quoted Sattar Khan, who was an Azerbaijani and an important figure in the Iranian Constitutional Revolution, and is thus considered to be a national hero in Iran. Iranian social media was also united "in saying Erdoğan must refer to Iran's history, which spans thousands of years, before supporting separation."

On 11 December, Iranian foreign minister Javad Zarif stated on Twitter:

Pres. Erdogan was not informed that what he ill-recited in Baku refers to the forcible separation of areas north of Aras from Iranian motherland. Didn't he realize that he was undermining the sovereignty of the Republic of Azerbaijan? No one can talk about our beloved Azerbaijan.

Iranian foreign ministry spokesman Saeed Khatibzadeh tweeted: "The Turkish ambassador was told that basing foreign policy on illusions is not wise," advising Turkish officials to read history. The foreign ministry summoned Turkey's ambassador to Iran in an act of protest.

A vast majority of Iran's parliament (225 out of 290) signed a statement that was subsequently read out loud on television, strongly condemning Erdoğan's remarks. According to the joint statement, the poem was considered "surprising and unacceptable." Iranian deputy speaker of parliament Ali Nikzad said: "Mr. Erdoğan, you have either not read history or wish to distort it." The Tabrizi representative in the Iranian parliament Mohammad Reza Mirtajodini tweeted: "Erdoğan has overstepped his boundaries and has apparently forgotten where he had turned to on the night of the 2016 coup!"

=== Turkey ===
The Turkish foreign ministry summoned Iran's ambassador to protest against the remarks made by the Iranian government.

Turkish presidential communications director Fahrettin Altun said the government condemned "the use of offensive language toward our president and our country over the recitation of a poem, whose meaning has been deliberately taken out of context". Altun added that the poem "passionately reflects the emotional experience of an aggrieved people due to Armenia's occupation of Azerbaijani lands (...) It does not include any references to Iran. Nor is that country implied in any way, shape or form". Turkish foreign minister Mevlüt Çavuşoğlu stated that "baseless and heavy statements made by Iran and aimed at our president are unacceptable". Çavuşoğlu assured that "Erdoğan fully respects Iran's national sovereignty and territorial integrity."

== Aftermath ==
In the days following the controversy, Iranian president Hassan Rouhani said that Iran could move beyond the row over the poem recited by Erdoğan. He stated: "In my opinion, with the explanations (Turkish officials) gave, we can move beyond this issue, but the sensitivity of our people is very important."

== See also ==
- Pan-Turkism
  - Whole Azerbaijan
  - Erdoğanism
- Anti-Iranian sentiment in the Turkic world
- Anti-Azerbaijani sentiment in Iran
