= Turkish Armed Forces Medal of Distinguished Courage and Self-Sacrifice =

- Type: Medal
- Awarded for: Great courage, self-sacrifice and risk of life
- Presented by: the Turkish Armed Forces
- Eligibility: Civilian or soldier, of any nationality
- Status: Currently awarded
- First award: 1975
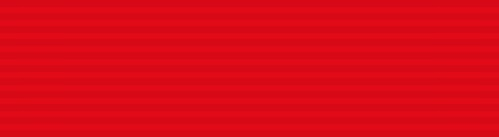

Turkish Armed Forces Medal of Distinguished Courage and Self-Sacrifice (Turkish: Türk Silahlı Kuvvetleri Üstün Cesaret ve Feragat Madalyası) is one of the highest medals that can be bestowed upon an individual by the Turkish Armed Forces (TAF) and was created on July 3, 1975.

== Technical specifications ==
=== General ===
Silver laurels encircling the gold medal that has an engraving of the Mehmetçik, the legendary and symbolic Turkish soldier, on top.

=== Decoration (regular size) ===
Made of three pieces

- Metal: Bronze
- Minting: 5 micrometre silver and 0.2 micrometre gold-plating
- Weight: 59 grams
- Diameter: 3,5 cm

=== Decoration (miniature size) ===
Made of three pieces

- Metal: Bronze
- Minting: 5 micrometre silver and 0.2 micrometre gold-plating
- Weight: 15 grams
- Diameter: 1 cm

=== Ribbon ===
- Color: Red with a golden crescent moon and a star on top

== Criteria ==
During war or peace, it is bestowed on individuals or regiments who have accomplished their missions with great courage and self-sacrifice while risking their lives.

The medal can be given to civilians or soldiers, regardless of nationality. Its bestowment is proposed by either the Deputy Minister for National Defense or by any of the Commanders of the four branches of the TAF, namely the Army, the Navy, the Air Force or the Gendarmerie (with the exception of the Commander of the fifth branch, the Coast Guard). The outcome of any proposition depends on the approval of the Chief of the General Staff.

== See also ==
- Medal of Independence (Turkey)
- Turkish Armed Forces Medal of Honor
- Turkish Armed Forces Medal of Distinguished Service
