= Kərkənc =

Kərkənc Քերքենջ • Kerkenj
- Municipality
- Location within Azerbaijan
- Coordinates: 40°35′01″N 48°34′03″E
- Country: Azerbaijan
- District: Shamakhi

Population
  - Total: 731
- Time zone: UTC+4 (AZT)

Kərkənc (Karkanj; Armenian: Քերքենջ, romanized: Kerkenj) is a village and municipality in the Shamakhi District of Azerbaijan. It has a population of 731. Until 1989 it was predominantly populated by ethnic Armenians. Between May and July 1989 the Armenian population of Karkanj were subject to an unusual village exchange with the then-Azerbaijani population of Gizil Shafag (now known as Dzyunashogh) in Armenia.
