= Türk Edebiyatı =

Turkish literary magazine

Türk Edebiyatı (translated Turkish Literature) is a Turkish monthly literary magazine based in Turkey. The magazine was first published on 15 January 1972. The founder was Ahmet Kabaklı. Beşir Ayvazoğlu served as the editor-in-chief of the magazine between 2005 and 2015. He was succeeded by Bahtiyar Aslan in the aforementioned post in June 2015.
