= Qəzyan, Qubadli =

Gazyan Azerbaijani: Qəzyan
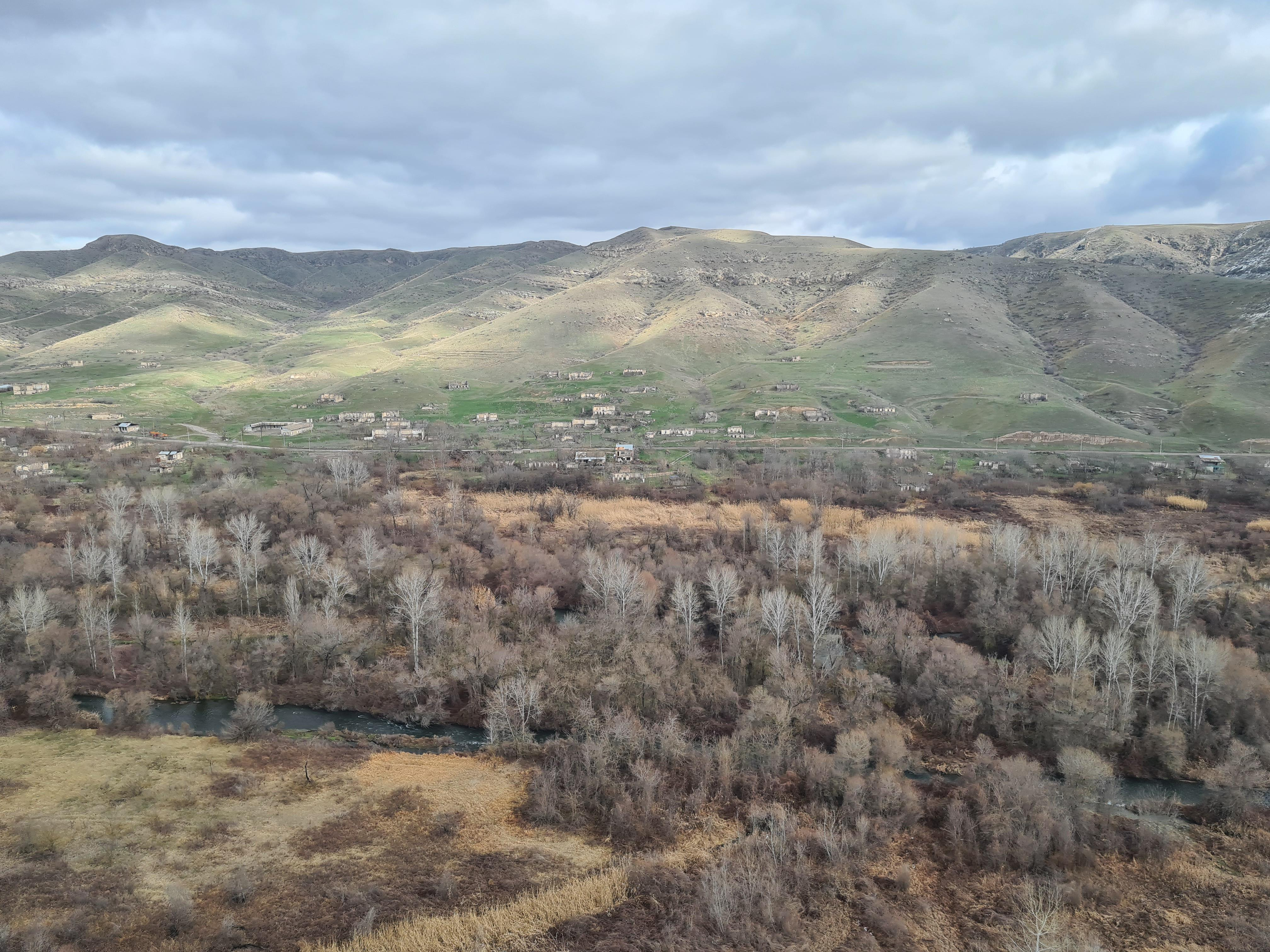

- Location within Azerbaijan
- Coordinates: 39°17′29″N 46°40′08″E
- Country: Azerbaijan
- District: Qubadli

Population (2015)
  - Total: 74
- Time zone: UTC+4 (AZT)

Gazyan (Azerbaijani: Qəzyan) is a village in the Qubadli District of Azerbaijan.

== History ==
The village was located in the Armenian-occupied territories surrounding Nagorno-Karabakh, coming under the control of ethnic Armenian forces during the First Nagorno-Karabakh War in the early 1990s. The village subsequently became part of the breakaway Republic of Artsakh as part of its Kashatagh Province, where it was known as Haykazyan (Armenian: Հայկազյան). It was recaptured by Azerbaijan on or around November 7, 2020 during the 2020 Nagorno-Karabakh war.

== Historical heritage sites ==
Historical heritage sites in and around the village include the bridge of Lalazar (Armenian: Լալազարի կամուրջ, romanized: Lalazari Kamurj), built in 1868.

== Demographics ==
There were 22 families with a total population of 74 in the community of Haykazyan in 2015.

== Notable people ==
- Aliyar Aliyev — National Hero of Azerbaijan.

== Gallery ==
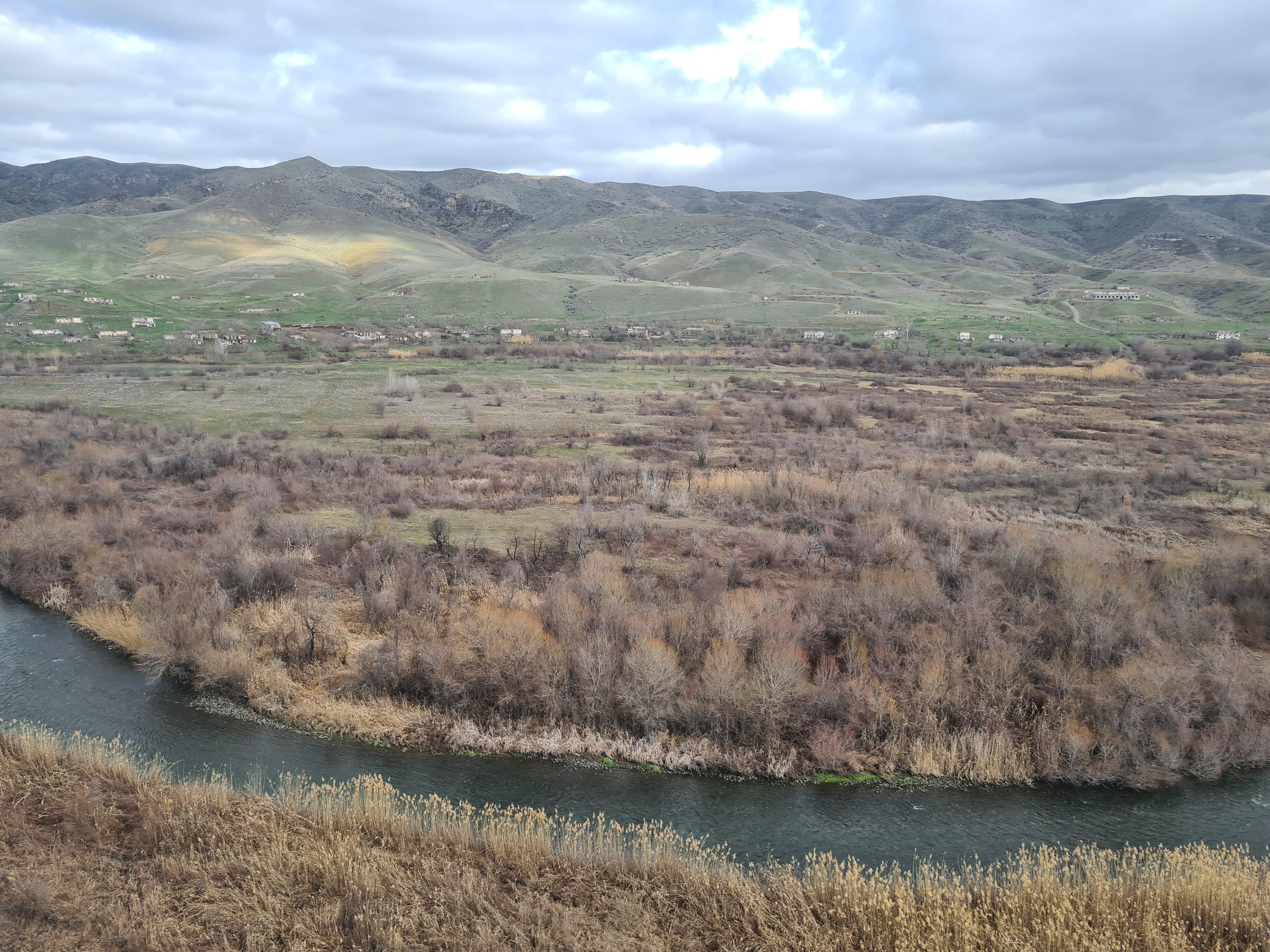

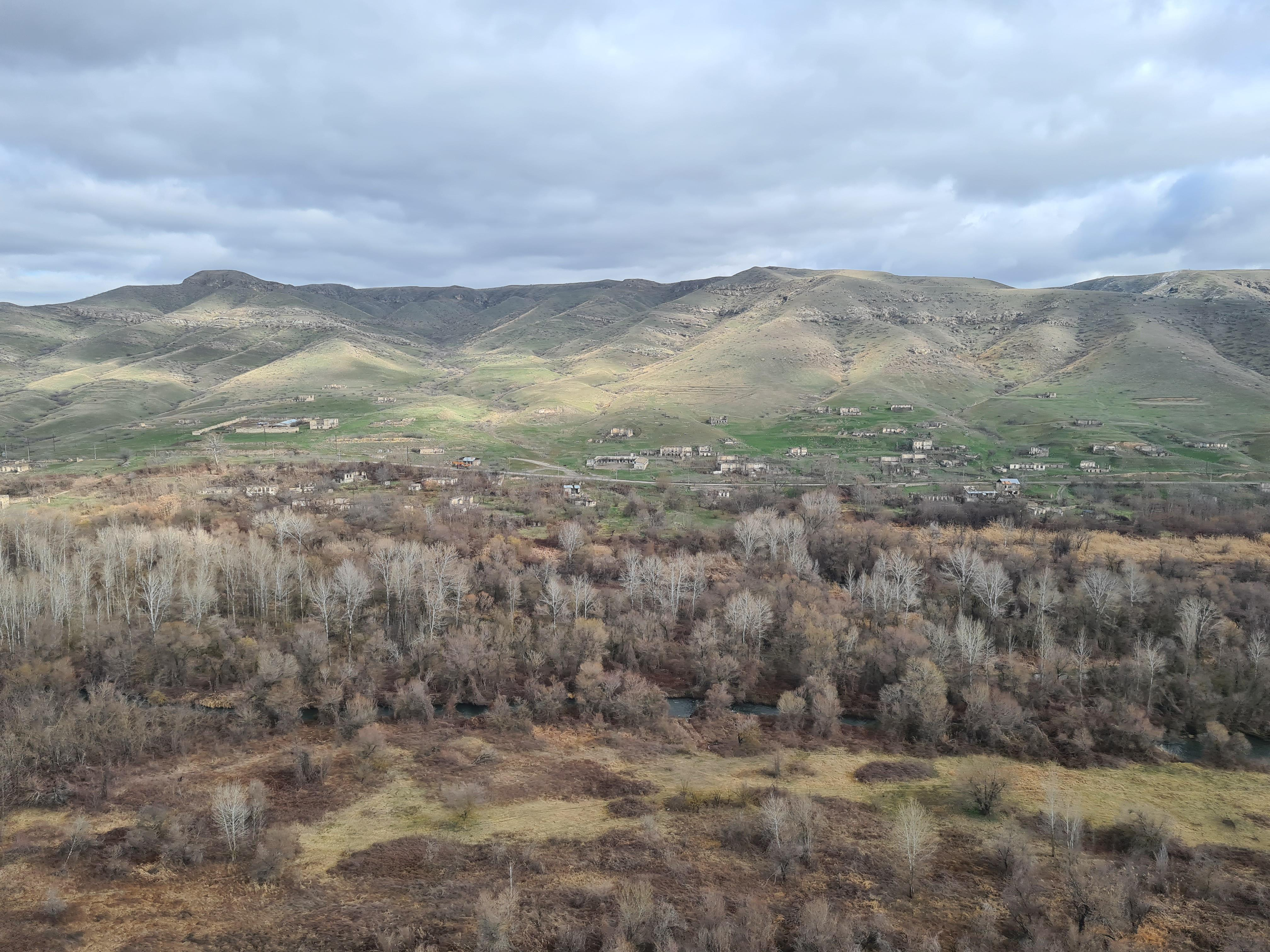

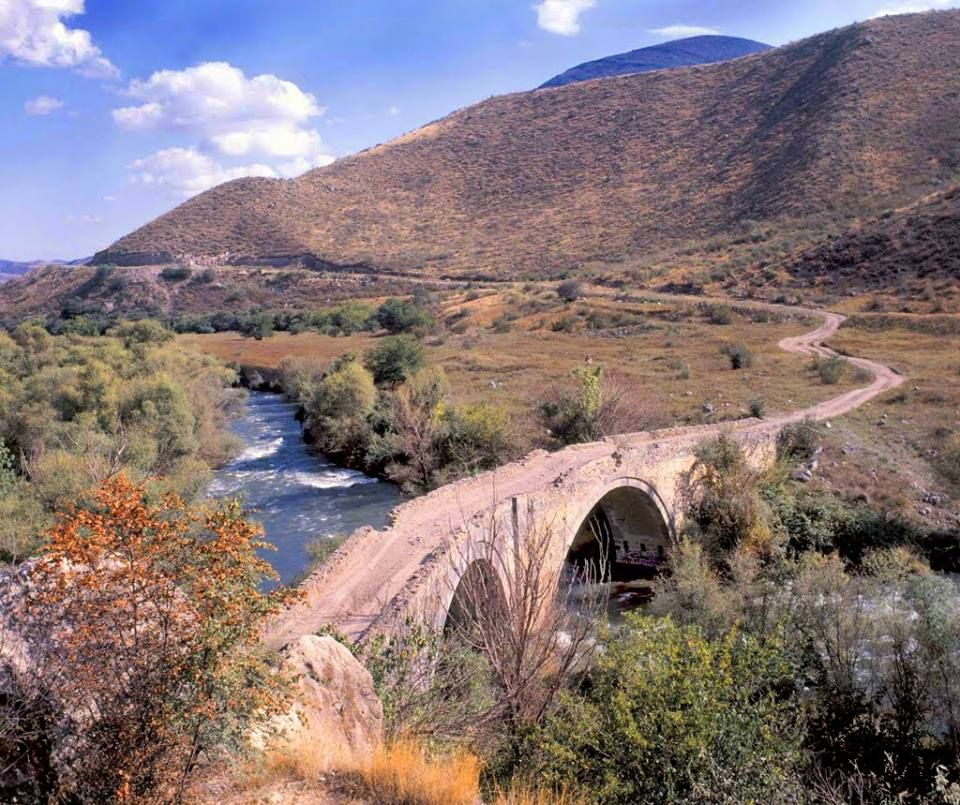
Lalazar Bridge
