= Xocamusaxlı =

Xocamusaxlı or Khodzhamusakhly or Khodzham Sagly may refer to:

- Aşağı Xocamusaxlı, Azerbaijan
- Yuxarı Xocamusaxlı, Azerbaijan
