= Fərcan =

- Location within Azerbaijan
- Coordinates: 39°16′23″N 46°33′47″E
- Country: Azerbaijan
- Rayon: Qubadli
- Time zone: UTC+4 (AZT)
  - Summer (DST): UTC+5 (AZT)

Fərcan (also, Fardzhan and Ferdzhan) is a village in the Qubadli Rayon of Azerbaijan. Fərcan is the Azeri village in Qubadli
