= Məlikəhmədli =

- Location within Azerbaijan
- Coordinates: 39°26′58″N 46°30′50″E
- Country: Azerbaijan
- District: Qubadli
- Time zone: UTC+4 (AZT)
  - Summer (DST): UTC+5 (AZT)

Məlikəhmədli (Malikahmadli) is a village in the Qubadli District of Azerbaijan.
