= Xallava =

- Location within Azerbaijan
- Coordinates: 39°22′43″N 46°29′15″E
- Country: Azerbaijan
- District: Qubadli
- Time zone: UTC+4 (AZT)
  - Summer (DST): UTC+5 (AZT)

Xallava is a village in the Qubadli Rayon of Azerbaijan.
