= Göyyal =

- Location within Azerbaijan
- Coordinates: 39°16′27″N 46°34′25″E
- Country: Azerbaijan
- Rayon: Qubadli
- Time zone: UTC+4 (AZT)
  - Summer (DST): UTC+5 (AZT)

Göyyal (also, Goyyal and Gëyyal) is a village in the Qubadli Rayon of Azerbaijan. Göyyal is the Azeri village in Qubadli
