= S. M. Junaid Zaidi =

Pakistani scientist, entrepreneur, and educator

SI HI S. M. Junaid Zaidi سید محمد جنید زیدی
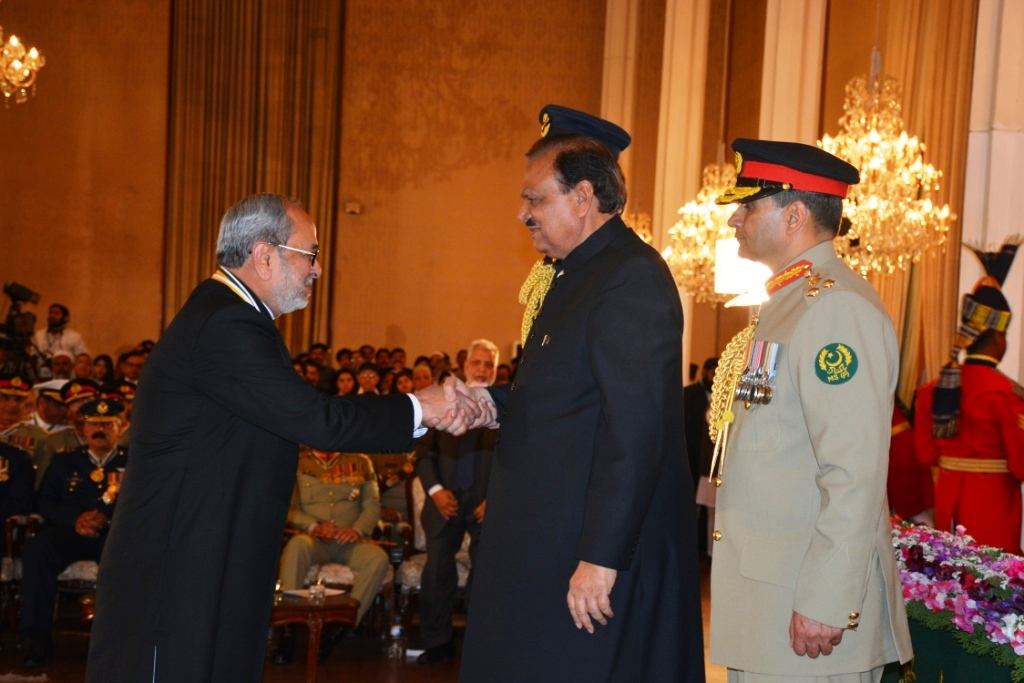
- S. M. Junaid Zaidi receiving his award Hilal-i-Imtiaz in 2015
- Born: 19 July 1949 (age 77); Rawalpindi, Pakistan
- Citizenship: (Pakistan) Pakistani
- Education: PhD
- Alma mater: University of the Punjab, University of Birmingham
- Occupations: Educator, Scientist, Entrepreneur, Administrator
- Known for: Founder Rector of CIIT, Executive Director of COMSATS
- Relatives: A. R. Khatoon, Zubaida Khatoon
- Awards: Sitara-e-Imtiaz (Star of Excellence) Award (2006), Hilal-i-Imtiaz (Crescent of Excellence) Award by the President of Pakistan (2015)

Syed Muhammed Junaid Zaidi (Urdu: سید محمد جنید زیدی); known as S. M. Junaid Zaidi (born 19 July 1949) is a Pakistani scientist, entrepreneur and educator. He is the founding rector of the COMSATS University Islamabad.

Junaid Zaidi (S.I, H.I) took the post of the Executive Director of Commission on Science and Technology for Sustainable Development (COMSATS) in Islamabad, Pakistan on February 27, 2017.

== Early life and education ==
Junaid Zaidi was born in Rawalpindi in 1949. After getting his master's degrees in Mathematics and Physics from the University of the Punjab, in 1981 he got another degree in Operations Research from the University of Birmingham. He completed his doctoral work at the University of Birmingham in 1984, specializing in optimization of algorithms on networking. On July 19, 2012, Lancaster University, UK, conferred on Zaidi an Honorary Degree of Doctor of Science.

== Positions held ==
He has served the government of Pakistan as the Director General of the National Center for Technology Transfer, (1991–95) and as "Scientific Secretary & Chief S&T" with the Pakistan Council for Science and Technology (1995–98). From 1998 to 2017 he was the founder Rector of the COMSATS University Islamabad (CUI), which was awarded charter by the Government of Pakistan in 2000. After retiring from CUI, he has been serving as the Executive Director of COMSATS, since March 2017.

== Awards and recognition ==
- Sitara-i-Imtiaz (Star of Excellence) Award by the President of Pakistan in 2006.
- Hilal-i-Imtiaz (Crescent of Excellence) Award by the President of Pakistan in 2015.
- The NCR Corporation award “IT Pioneer 1987-1995” in the year 2000.
- Doctorate of Science Honoris Causa, University of Lancaster, 2012.
- Al-Farabi gold medal, awarded by the Academic Council of Al-Farabi Kazakh National University (KazNU), 2018.
- Center of Islamic Finance - Special Award in 2017

== Allegations ==
Dr S. M. Junaid Zaidi served as the chairman of the controversial National Testing Service (NTS) for over 15 years. He got embroiled in a corruption and malpractice scandal of the NTS and faced charges in the accountability court. Dr Junaid Zaidi has also come under severe criticism from a parliamentary committee, a sub-committee of the Public Accounts Committee (PAC) for his central role in the controversial Dual Degree programme (DDP) which was started illegally without the approval of Higher Education Commission and put at stake the future of 2,532 students. There have been allegations of money-laundering of nearly 6 million Pounds in the DDP case which is being investigated by the Federal Investigation Agency (FIA).

In 2018, the Minister of State for Science & Technology, Mir Dostain Khan Domki, claimed in the media that Comsats University and NTS were being run by a "mafia" who were involved in corruption.
