= Hərtiz =

- Location within Azerbaijan
- Coordinates: 39°16′45″N 46°35′33″E
- Country: Azerbaijan
- Rayon: Qubadli
- Time zone: UTC+4 (AZT)
  - Summer (DST): UTC+5 (AZT)

Hərtiz (also, Hərtis and Gartiz) is a village in the Qubadli Rayon of Azerbaijan.

Hərtiz is the Azeri village in Qubadli
