= Teymur Müskənli =

- Location within Azerbaijan
- Coordinates: 39°25′37″N 46°30′16″E
- Country: Azerbaijan
- Rayon: Qubadli
- Time zone: UTC+4 (AZT)
  - Summer (DST): UTC+5 (AZT)

Teymur Müskənli (also, Teymurmyuskanly) is a village in the Qubadli Rayon of Azerbaijan.
