= Mirlər =

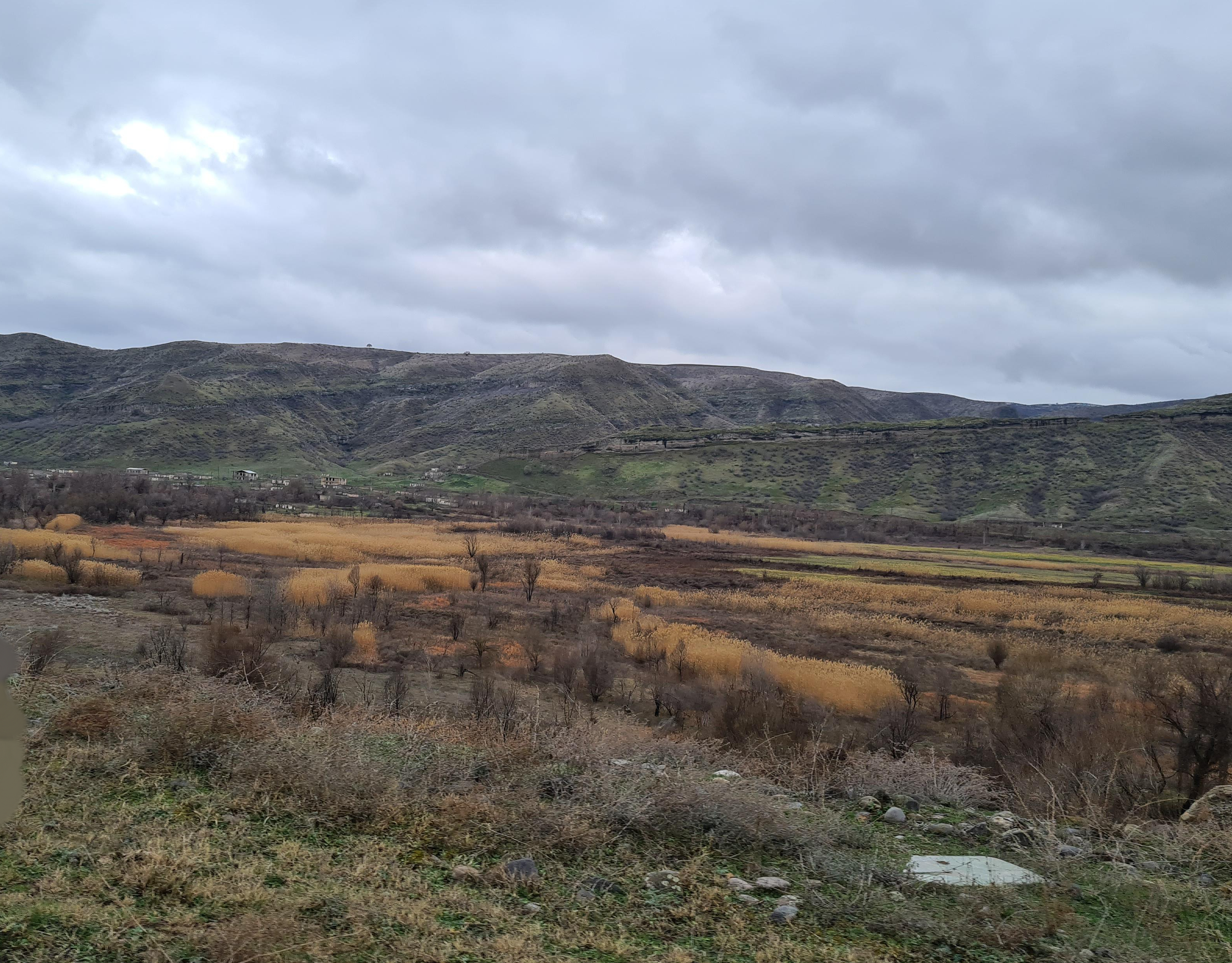
- Ruined state of Mirlar following three decades of Armenian occupation

- Location within Azerbaijan
- Coordinates: 39°17′58″N 46°38′03″E
- Country: Azerbaijan
- District: Qubadli
- Time zone: UTC+4 (AZT)

Mirlər (Mirlar) is a village in the Qubadli District of Azerbaijan.
