= Abdalanlı =

- Location within Azerbaijan
- Coordinates: 39°24′33″N 46°32′45″E
- Country: Nagorno-Karabakh Republic (de facto); Azerbaijan (de jure)
- Rayon: Qubadli
- Time zone: UTC+4 (AZT)
  - Summer (DST): UTC+5 (AZT)

Abdalanlı (also, Abdalanly and Abdalinlu) is a village in the Qubadli Rayon of Azerbaijan. Abdalani is the Azeri village in Qubadli.
