= Lalazar Bridge =

Lalazar Bridge Laləzar körpüsü
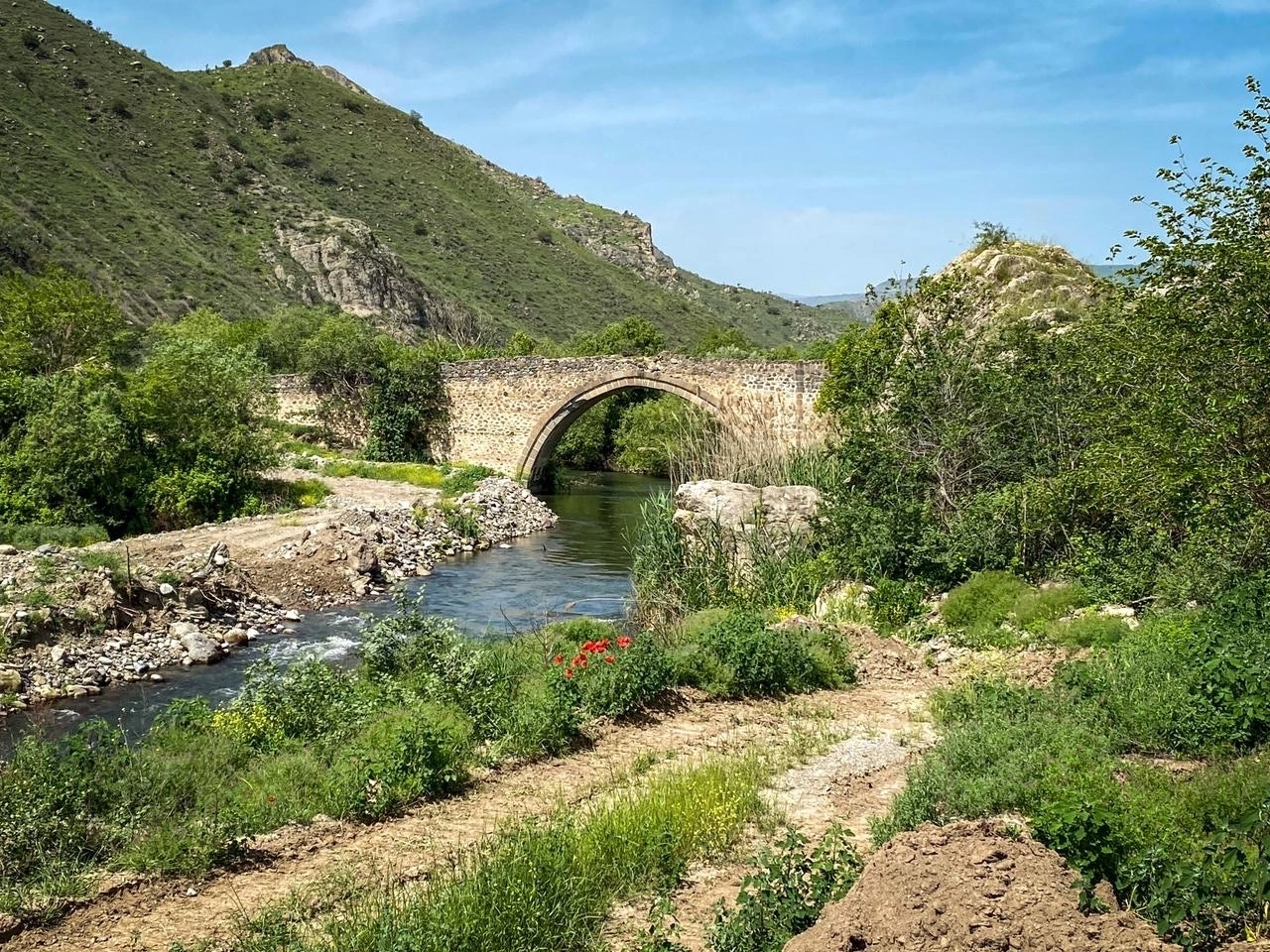
- Lalazar Bridge in 2023
- Coordinates: 39°26′28″N 46°27′46″E
- Crosses: Bargushad

Characteristics
- Material: Stone
- Total length: 17 meters
- Width: 2.8 meters

History
- Construction end: 1867

Location
- Interactive map of Lalazar Bridge

The Lalazar Bridge (Azerbaijani: Laləzar körpüsü) is a historic architectural monument in the Əliquluuşağı, Qubadli District of Azerbaijan.

== History ==
The construction of Lalazar Bridge was completed in about 1867. However, some sources say that the bridge was built earlier, in the 18th century. The monument built on the Bargushad river has one arch, the lower part is oval, and the upper part is flat. Like many historical bridges in Azerbaijan, natural rocks were used for support. The width of the Lalazar Bridge is 2.8 meters, the height above the water surface is 4.5 meters.

== See also ==
- Architecture of Azerbaijan
