= Qaraimanlı =

- Location within Azerbaijan
- Coordinates: 39°23′36″N 46°39′50″E
- Country: Azerbaijan
- District: Qubadli

Population
  - Total: 168
- Time zone: UTC+4 (AZT)
  - Summer (DST): UTC+5 (AZT)

Qaraimanlı is a village in the Qubadli Rayon of Azerbaijan.
