= Seytas =

- Location within Azerbaijan
- Coordinates: 39°23′03″N 46°25′16″E
- Country: Azerbaijan
- District: Qubadli
- Time zone: UTC+4 (AZT)
  - Summer (DST): UTC+5 (AZT)

Seytas is a village in the Qubadli District of Azerbaijan.
