= Novlu =

- Location within Azerbaijan
- Coordinates: 39°24′49″N 46°27′06″E
- Country: Azerbaijan
- Rayon: Qubadli
- Time zone: UTC+4 (AZT)
  - Summer (DST): UTC+5 (AZT)

Novlu is a village in the Qubadli Rayon of Azerbaijan.

Novlu is Azeri village in Qubadli
