= Cılfır =

- Location within Azerbaijan
- Coordinates: 39°24′34″N 46°28′49″E
- Country: Azerbaijan
- Rayon: Qubadli
- Time zone: UTC+4 (AZT)
  - Summer (DST): UTC+5 (AZT)

Cılfır (also, Dzhilfir and Dzhylfyr) is a village in the Qubadli Rayon of Azerbaijan.
