= Ilham Shahmuradov =

Azerbaijani academic (born 1958)

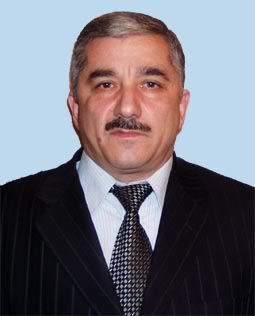
- Born: Shahmuradov Ilham Ayyub; 1 January 1958 (age 68); Qubadli District, Azerbaijan SSR
- Education: Academy of Sciences of the USSR (PhD 1987)
- Scientific career
- Fields: Medical biology, genetics
- Workplaces: Azerbaijan National Academy of Sciences, Baku State University

Ilham Shahmuradov (born 1 January 1958) is the Azerbaijan National Academy of Sciences Head of Bioinformatics laboratory in ANAS Botany Institute, professor of Department of Medical Biology and Genetics in the Azerbaijan Medical University, doctor of biological sciences, Curator of the Bioinformatics courses in the Departments of Biology, Ecology and Solil Sciences, Baku State University, corresponding member of Azerbaijan National Academy of Sciences

== Life ==
Shahmuradov: PhD (Genetics, 1987; Institute of Cytology and Genetics, Academy of Sciences of the (former) USSR, Siberian Branch, Russia) and Doctor of Sciences (Genetics, 2005; Institute of Botany, Azerbaijan National Academy of Sciences, ANAS).

Professor, Department of Medical Biology and Genetics, Azerbaijan Medical University (2013 – 2014), Foreign Professor, Department of Biosciences, COMSATS Institute of Information Technology, Islamabad, Pakistan (2007–2010), Head of Bioinformatics Laboratory, Institute of Botany, Azerbaijan National Academy of Sciences (ANAS), Baku, Azerbaijan (2002 – present), Researcher, Department of Computer Science, Royal Holloway, University of London, Egham, UK (2001–2004), Visiting scientist, Bioinformatics Department, Helix Research Institute, Kisarazu, Japan (2000–2001), Head of Group of Mathematical Modeling, Institute of Botany, ANAS (1989 – 2000), Researcher, Department of Molecular-Genetic Bases of Production Processes, Institute of Botany, ANAS (1987–1989).

== Area of scientific interest ==
Structure and evolution of eukaryotic genomes; Organization and expression of genes in eukaryotic genomes; Organelle-to-nucleus gene transfer in plants; Development of bioinformatics tools and databases.

== Membership with international and foreign scientific organizations ==
- Secretary General of the Azerbaijan Society of Biochemists and Molecular Biologists
- Member of the Azerbaijan National Committee of "Bioethics, Ethics of Science and Technologies" under the UNESCO

== Bibliography ==
- Shahmuradov, Ilham; Abdulazimova, Amina; Khan, Farah Zaib; Solovyev, Victor; Mustafayev, Nurmamed; Akbarova, Yagut; Qamar, Raheel; Aliyev, Jalal (2012). "The PlantProm DB: Recent Updates". 2012 International Conference on Biomedical Engineering and Biotechnology. pp. 612–4. doi:10.1109/iCBEB.2012.433. ISBN 978-0-7695-4706-0. S2CID 31944376.
- Shahmuradov, Ilham Ayub (2011). "Computational recognition of gene boundaries". Current Opinion in Biotechnology. 22: S22–3. doi:10.1016/j.copbio.2011.05.035.
- Solovyev, Victor V.; Shahmuradov, Ilham A.; Salamov, Asaf A. (2010). "Identification of Promoter Regions and Regulatory Sites". Computational Biology of Transcription Factor Binding. Methods in Molecular Biology. Vol. 674. pp. 57–83. doi:10.1007/978-1-60761-854-6_5. ISBN 978-1-60761-853-9. PMID 20827586.
- Akhtar, Malik; Bukhari, Syed; Fazal, Zeeshan; Qamar, Raheel; Shahmuradov, Ilham A (2010). "POLYAR, a new computer program for prediction of poly(A) sites in human sequences". BMC Genomics. 11: 646. doi:10.1186/1471-2164-11-646. PMC 3053588. PMID 21092114.
- Shahmuradov IA, Abdulazimova A.U., Aliyev JA, Qamar R, Chohan S, Solovyev VV (2010) Mono- and Bi-Cistronic Chimeric mRNAs in Arabidopsis and Rice Genomes. Applied and Computational Mathematics, 9, 19-33
- Akbarova YA, Shahmuradov IA, Solovyev VV (2010) Possible Functional and Evolutionary Role of Plastid DNA Insertions in Rice. Applied and Computational Mathematics 2010, 9, 66-81
- Shahmuradov, I. A.; Solovyev, V. V.; Gammerman, A. J. (2005). "Plant promoter prediction with confidence estimation". Nucleic Acids Research. 33 (3): 1069–76. doi:10.1093/nar/gki247. PMC 549412. PMID 15722481.
- Shahmuradov, I. A.; Gammerman, A. J.; Hancock, J. M.; Bramley, P. M.; Solovyev, V. V. (2003). "Plant Prom: A database of plant promoter sequences". Nucleic Acids Research. 31 (1): 114–7. doi:10.1093/nar/gkg041. PMC 165488. PMID 12519961.
- Shahmuradov IA, Solovyev VV (2003) PromH: promoters identification using orthologous genomic sequences. Nucl. Acids. Res., 31, 3540–3545
- Shahmuradov IA, Akbarova YYu, Solovyev VV, Aliyev JA (2003) Abundance of plastid DNA insertions in nuclear genomes rice and Arabidopsis. Plant Molecular Biology, 52, 923-934
- Gordon L, Chervonenkis AYa, Gammerman A.J., Shahmuradov IA, Solovyev VV (2003). Sequence alignment kernel for recognition of promoter regions. Bioinformatics, 19, 1964–1971
- Kapitonov VV, Shakhmuradov IA, Kolchanov NA (1989) Evolution of Alu repeats: Imitation model. Genetics (USSR/Russia), 25,1111-1118
- Shakhmuradov IA, Kapitonov VV, Kolchanov NA, Omelyanchuk LV (1989). Evolution of Alu repeats: Dynamics of propagation in genome. Genetics (USSR/Russia), 25, 1682-1689
- Kolchanov NA, Shakhmuradov IA, Kapitonov VV, Omelyanchuk LV (1988) Evolutionary aspects of the mammalian Alu repeats. Molecular Biology (USSR/Russia), 22, 1335-1344
- Kapitonov VV, Kolchanov NA, Shakhmuradov IA, Solovyev VV (1987) The existence of the sites homological to the regulatory site of heat-shock in mobile genetic elements. Genetics (USSR/Russia), 12, 2112-2119
- Bogachev SS, Blinov AG, Blinov VM, Gaidamakova EK, Kolesnikov NN, Kiknadze II, Shakhmuradov IA (1986) Some structural elements in DNA sequence from Balbiani ring of IV Chromosome of Chironomus thummi. Proceedings of Academy of Sciences of (former) USSR (now Russia), 288, 230-233
- Shakhmuradov IA, Kolchanov NA, Solovyev VV, Ratner VA (1986) Enhancer-like structures in middle repetitive DNA elements of eukaryotic genomes. Genetics (USSR/Russia), 22, 357-367
