= Boyunəkər =

- Location within Azerbaijan
- Coordinates: 39°14′44″N 46°38′22″E
- Country: Azerbaijan
- Rayon: Qubadli
- Time zone: UTC+4 (AZT)
  - Summer (DST): UTC+5 (AZT)

Boyunəkər (also, Boyunagyar, Boynakar, and Boyunakyar) is a village in the Qubadli Rayon of Azerbaijan.
