= Hüseynuşağı =

- Location within Azerbaijan
- Coordinates: 39°14′37″N 46°42′56″E
- Country: Azerbaijan
- Rayon: Qubadli
- Time zone: UTC+4 (AZT)
  - Summer (DST): UTC+5 (AZT)

Hüseynuşağı (also, Guseynushagy and Guseyn-Ushagi) is a village in the Qubadli Rayon of Azerbaijan.

Hüseyinuşağı is the Kurdish village in Qubadli.
