= Tarovlu =

- Location within Azerbaijan
- Coordinates: 39°19′59″N 46°32′01″E
- Country: Azerbaijan
- Rayon: Qubadli
- Time zone: UTC+4 (AZT)
  - Summer (DST): UTC+5 (AZT)

Tarovlu is a village in the Qubadli Rayon of Azerbaijan.
