= Aisha Mughal =

Pakistani transgender rights activist

- عائشہ مغل
- Born: Aisha Mughal
- Occupation: Transgender rights expert
- Known for: Member Ministry of Human Rights, Pakistan

Aisha Mughal (Urdu: عائشہ مغل) is a Pakistani transgender rights expert and researcher.

== Education ==
Mughal received her MPhil degree in human resource management from COMSATS University Islamabad.

== Career ==
Mughal works in Ministry of Human Rights, Pakistan as a transgender rights expert and UNDP Expert Consultant. She has been working for transgender rights in Pakistan since 2015.

She has represented Pakistan in a National Delegation at the UN CEDAW (Convention on Elimination of Discrimination Against Women) committee in Geneva, Switzerland in 2020. The CEDAW is a committee that works for women rights, their equal access to health, education, political participation and employment. It was the very first time in history that a transgender person has represented any country for a reporting procedure of an official UN treaty review.

She has published research articles on Transgender people in peer reviewed journals. She played key role as part of National Task Force on Transgender Bill and getting it approved to Transgender Persons (Protection of Rights) Act, 2018. She has also worked at National commission for Human Rights (NCHR), Government of Pakistan.

She has also taught in Quaid-i-Azam University for some time.
