= Xocik =

- Location within Azerbaijan
- Coordinates: 39°20′51″N 46°41′12″E
- Country: Azerbaijan
- Rayon: Qubadli
- Time zone: UTC+4 (AZT)
  - Summer (DST): UTC+5 (AZT)

Xocik (also, Xoçik and Khodzhik) is a village in the Qubadli Rayon of Azerbaijan.
