= Göyər Abbas =

- Location within Azerbaijan
- Coordinates: 39°23′00″N 46°27′29″E
- Country: Azerbaijan
- Rayon: Qubadli
- Time zone: UTC+4 (AZT)
  - Summer (DST): UTC+5 (AZT)

Göyər Abbas (also, Göyərabas, Gëyarabas, and Geyarbas) is a village in the Qubadli Rayon of Azerbaijan.
