= Qundanlı =

- Location within Azerbaijan
- Coordinates: 39°26′01″N 46°29′16″E
- Country: Azerbaijan
- District: Qubadli
- Time zone: UTC+4 (AZT)
  - Summer (DST): UTC+5 (AZT)

Qundanlı is a village in the Qubadli Rayon of Azerbaijan.
