= Altınca =

- Location within Azerbaijan
- Coordinates: 39°13′N 46°40′E
- Country: Azerbaijan
- Rayon: Qubadli
- Time zone: UTC+4 (AZT)
  - Summer (DST): UTC+5 (AZT)

Altınca (Altynja) is a village in the Qubadli Rayon of Azerbaijan.
