= COMSATS University Islamabad =

Public university in Islamabad, Pakistan

Coordinates: 33.6518°N 73.1566°E

- جامعہَ کومسیٹس اسلام آباد
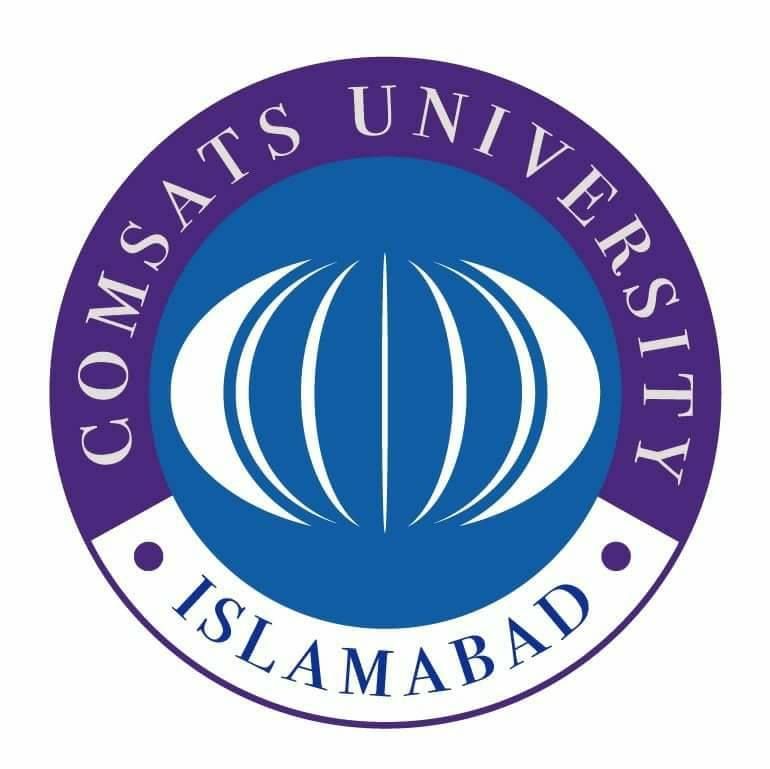
- Other name: CUI
- Type: Public
- Established: 1998
- Founder: S. M. Junaid Zaidi
- Affiliations: Commission on Science and Technology for Sustainable Development in the South, Ministry of Science and Technology (Pakistan), Higher Education Commission (Pakistan), Pakistan Engineering Council, Pharmacy Council of Pakistan, Pakistan Council for Architects and Town Planners
- Endowment: PKR 300 million
- Chancellor: President of Pakistan
- Rector: Prof. Dr. Raheel Qamar, T.I. (Rector)
- Faculty: 2,679
- Students: 35,452
- Undergraduates: 28,964
- Postgraduates: 6,488
- Location: Islamabad, Pakistan
- Campus: Multiple Sites
- Colors: Blue white
- Mascot: COMSIAN
- Website: comsats.edu.pk

The COMSATS University Islamabad (CUI), formerly known as COMSATS Institute of Information Technology (CIIT), is a public university in Pakistan. It is a multi-campus university with its principal seat located in Islamabad. Comsats was envisioned as Pakistan's first exclusive Institute of Information Technology. In the latest QS University Rankings, CUI ranked 1st in Pakistan and 801–1000 in the world. Nationally it is ranked top-most in Computer Sciences and IT category. COMSATS is also highly regarded as one of the finest Engineering School in the country. COMSATS is often seen as in academic race with other best Universities like NUST, FAST and GIKI. COMSATS University Islamabad (CUI) is under the administration of the Commission on Science and Technology for Sustainable Development in the South.

== Overview ==
The university was established by the Commission on Science and Technology for Sustainable Development in the South (COMSATS) in 1998, while its first charter was granted by the Government of Pakistan in August 2000. Palestine joined the COMSATS as its 23rd member state in October 2015. S. M. Junaid Zaidi is the Founder Rector of the university and continued to serve the university till March 2017. The position of Rector remained vacant for the period of almost three years and Muhammad Tabassum Afzal assumed charge as Rector in July 2020 and was tasked with leading the university after its transition from an Institute of Information Technology to a full-fledged university having a new governance structure. COMSATS was envisioned as Pakistan's first exclusive Institute of Information Technology. Previously, its name was COMSATS Institute of Information Technology (CIIT), which was transformed into a full-fledged university called the COMSATS University Islamabad (CUI) by an Act of Parliament in April 2018.

This university was ranked among the top 250 Asian Universities by QS University Rankings in 2014 and nationally it is ranked top-most in Computer Sciences and IT category and 1st overall in the country according to NatureIndex. CIIT is ranked amongst the top 10 universities of Pakistan as per HEC recent rankings. It is also a member of the Association of Commonwealth Universities. Its main campus, located in Islamabad, has over 8,500 students and 30,000 more students in its 6 satellite campuses. Its student body also includes international students from over 9 countries. It has 20 departments which combined offer 100 degree programs and has since inception produced over 315 PhDs. It has also established the country's first ever Student Startup Business Center (SSBC) to support and promote entrepreneurship and innovation in its academic environment. In partnership with Brookes Pharma (Private) Limited (Métier pharma), the Career Development Center at COMSATS University Islamabad Campus hosted an awareness session on "Women's Health and Hygiene." Young female COMSATS students attended the session, which was quite informative for them.

=== International Rankings ===
University rankings

Global – Overall
- ARWU World: 501–600 (2023)
- QS World: 651–660 (2024)
- THE World: 601–800 (2024)
- USNWR Global: =441 (2023)

Regional – Overall
- QS Asia: 137 (2022)

In the Times Higher Education World University Rankings 2020, CUI has been placed among 801-1000 world's best universities, and ranked 2nd in Pakistan. Besides, it was also ranked at #301-400 in THE Engineering & Technology, #401-500 in Computer Science, and Life Sciences and #501-600 in Physical Sciences subject rankings 2019. CUI was also ranked 159th in THE Emerging Economies Rankings 2020, 131st in THE Asian University Rankings 2019, and was among 150-200 THE top young universities of the world in 2018.

· Ranked at 301+ in THE University Impact Rankings 2019, and 5th in Pakistan. Inaugural participant. Besides, CUI was ranked in its 07 SDGS out of 11:
SDG 3 Good Health and Wellbeing (ranked 301+)
SDG 8 Decent Work and Economic Growth (ranked 101–200)
SDG 9 Industry, Innovation and Infrastructure (ranked 201–300)
SDG 11 Sustainable Cities and Communities (ranked 201+)
SDG 13 Climate Action (ranked 201+)
SDG 16 Peace, Justice and Strong Institutions (ranked 201+)
SDG 17 Partnerships for goals 301+.

==== QS Rankings ====
CUI was ranked 801-1000 among the world's best universities as per the QS World Universities Rankings 2020. Besides, it was ranked 135th in the QS Asian Universities Rankings 2019. In 2013, it also received the prestigious 3-Stars Rating by QS.

==== Shanghai Rankings ====
CUI was ranked first in Pakistan and amongst 501-600 ranked university in the world by the Academic Ranking of World Universities (ARWU) prestigious Shanghai Rankings 2019.

== Campuses ==
COMSATS university is a multi-campus university. Apart from the main campus in Islamabad, the university also has sub-campuses located in Lahore, Attock, Vehari, Abbottabad, Wah and Sahiwal as well as one virtual campus. COMSATS University has seven campuses, 100-degree programs, 36000 enrolled students, 700 Ph.D. students, 500 Master's students, 1077 Ph.D. instructors, and is ranked second in research and first in IT.

=== Islamabad ===
The main campus in Islamabad was established in 1998. During the first year of its establishment, the institute offered only a few certificate courses and a postgraduate diploma in computer studies with a single classroom and limited resources. The Islamabad campus is situated at Chak Shahzad, Islamabad. Currently, more than 9000 students are enrolled in various degree programs at this campus.

=== Abbottabad ===
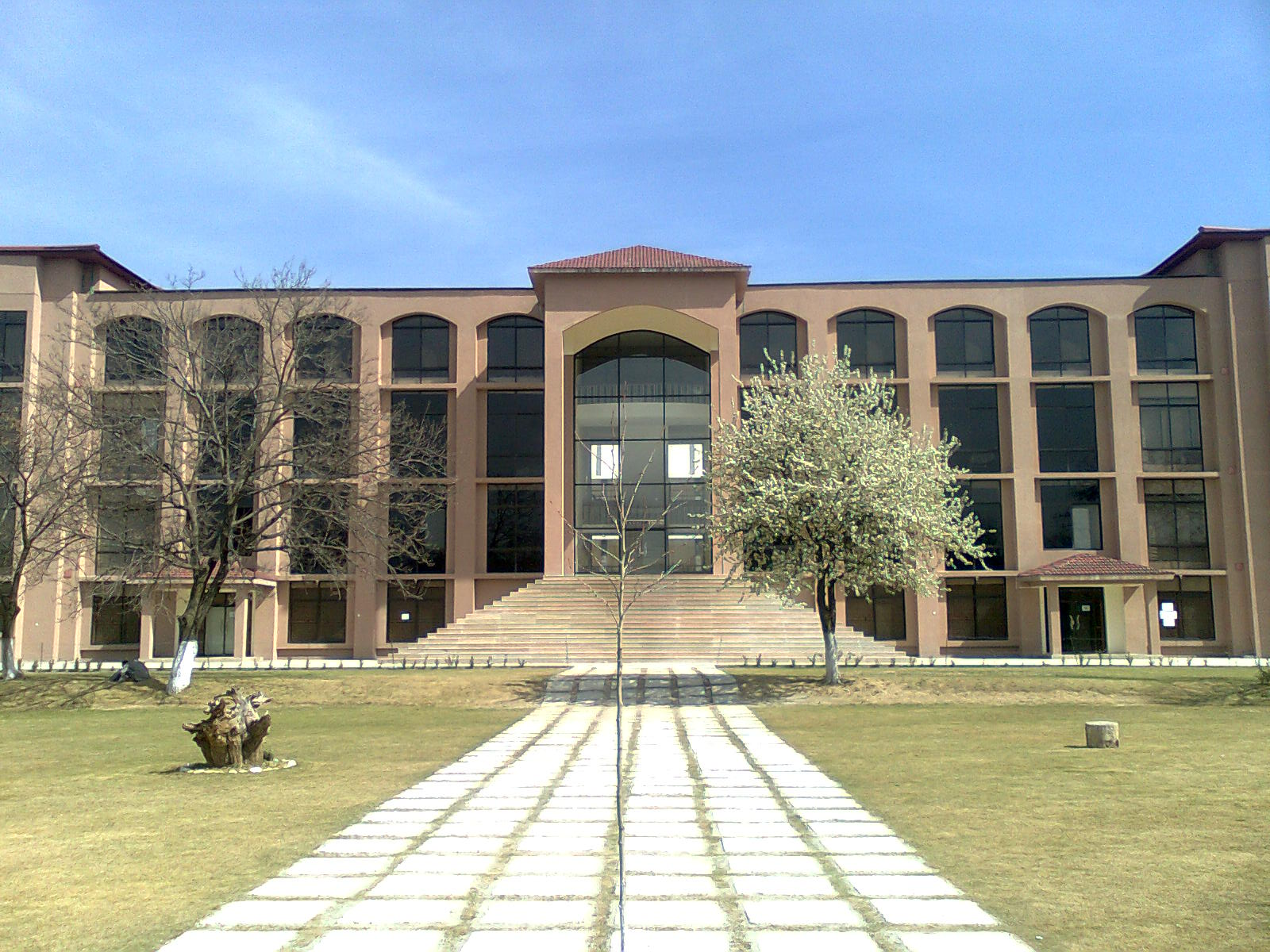
CUI Abbottabad Campus

The Abbottabad campus became functional in July 2001 through the initiative of founder director Haroon-ur-Rasheed and the first academic session started in September 2001. This campus is ideally situated in the vicinity of the Pakistan Military Academy, Kakul. The campus is built on 15.5 ha (38 acres) of land leased from GHQ by the Pakistan Army at Tobe Camp. The abandoned army barracks were converted into a living campus within a short period of two months by the university team. The first academic session started with a student strength of 121 and only three undergraduate programs.

=== Attock ===
The Attock campus was established in 2004. There are 4 departments, 9 undergraduate, and 6 graduate programs that are being offered. More than 2,650 students are enrolled with a qualified faculty strength of 179 including 55 PhDs. More than 500 research papers are published.

=== Vehari ===
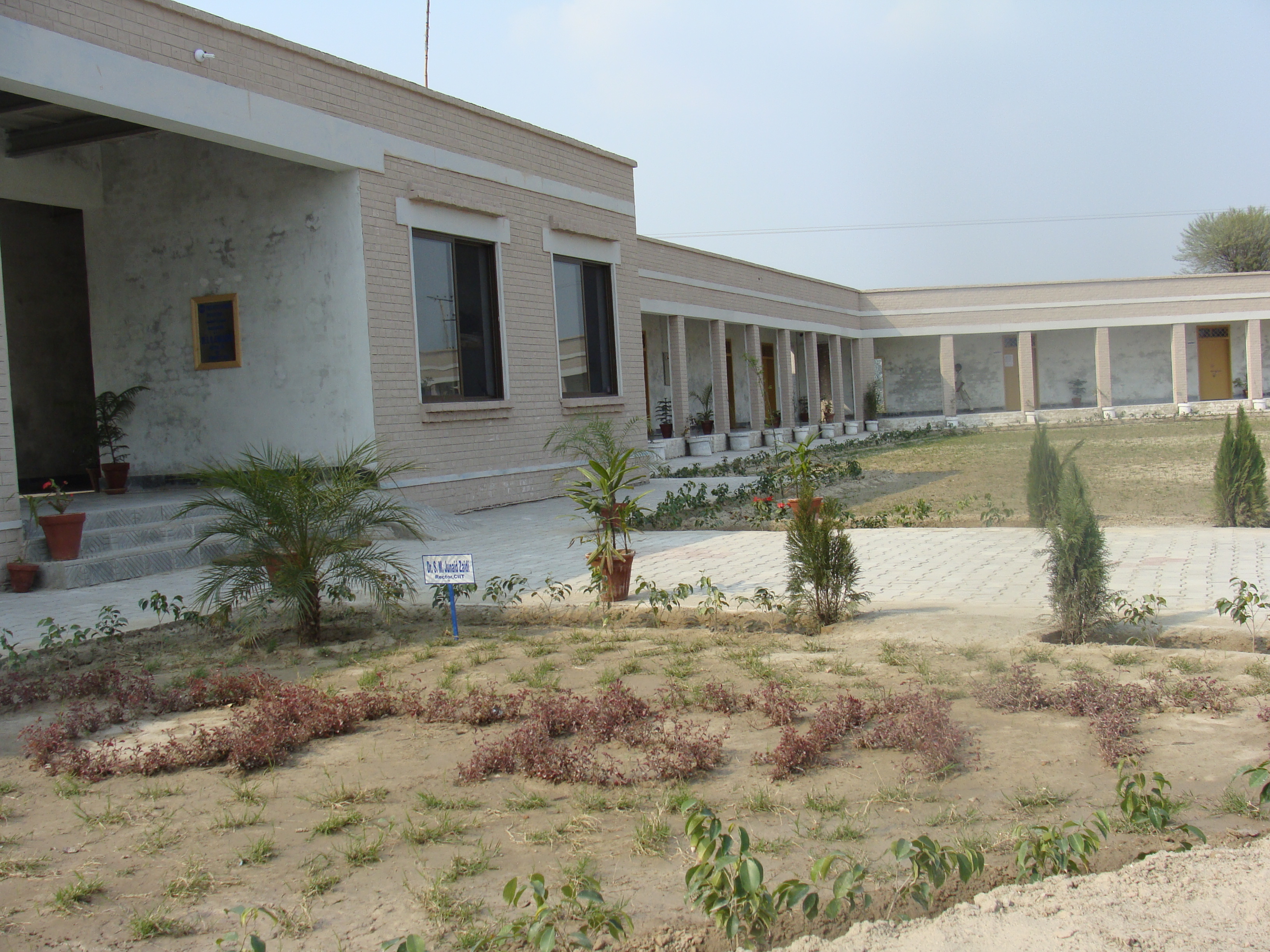
CUI Vehari Campus

Established in 2008, the Vehari campus started with 45 students enrolled in one program and now it has more than 2,432 students, more than 148 faculty members, 14 programs, and three functional academic blocks.

=== Lahore ===
CUI Lahore Campus

The Lahore Campus is located on 01 km, Defence Road, Off Raiwind Road and is a 30-minute drive from the main city. This campus was established in January 2002.

- Campus Established: 2002
- Total Area: 75 ha (185 acres)
- Total no. of faculty: 482
- Total no. of PhD faculty: 240
- Total Programs Offered: 54 (27 Graduate, 17 MS, 10 PhD) including programs in Information Science & Technology, Engineering, Natural Sciences, Business Administration, Architecture and Design etc.
- Enrolled Students: 7148
- Director: Professor Dr. Muhammad Yar, T.I.
- Total Graduates till Spring-2024: 21,584

=== Wah ===
CUI Wah Campus

The opening of COMSATS University in the historical and industrial town of Wah was a joint effort of the university and Pakistan Ordnance Factories (POF) which is located in Wah Cantonment. The university management started campus at Wah in a record period of 70 days. The then-Minister for Science and Technology and Chancellor of the university formally inaugurated the institute on 14 September 2001. Initially, the Wah campus started its operation in the small guest house of POF. In 2003, two purpose-built academic blocks were handed over to the university on a long-term lease period by the POF. The Wah campus extended its academic facilities by purchasing land contiguous to the existing campus in 2012 measuring 4.8 ha (12 acres). The campus has also acquired 20 Acres of land near Brahma Bahtar Interchange on the M1 motorway to meet its future academic requirements.

=== Sahiwal ===
The Sahiwal campus situated at Sahiwal was formally inaugurated in September 2007. It has 7 academic departments and 10 other services departments. It has 3800 students from different departments.

=== Virtual Campus ===
The CUI virtual campus was established in July 2008 and started its regular functions in January 2012. The campus was established in offices, laboratories, and studios located in Islamabad having approximately 1,900 m^{2} (20,000 sq ft) of covered area. State-of-the-art servers, dedicated PERN (Pakistan Educational Research Network) bandwidth, as well as the latest audiovisual equipment, was acquired to set up laboratories, studios, and a data center. The virtual campus started its first academic session in Fall 2012 offering four undergraduate level degree programs in computer science and management science subjects. The Virtual Campus was stalled in 2016 due to an absence of a Virtual Education Policy by the Higher Education Commission of Pakistan.

== Academics ==
The university is offering undergraduate and graduate programs in different disciplines, different programs available at different campuses.

=== Undergraduate programs ===
COMSATS offers undergraduate programs for BS and bachelor's degrees.

==== Bachelor of Science ====
- Accounting & Finance
- Bioinformatics
- Biotechnology
- Biosciences
- Business Administration
- Chemical Engineering
- Civil Engineering
- Computer Engineering
- Computer Science
- Development Studies
- Economics
- Electronics and Computing
- Electrical Engineering
- Electrical (Electronics) Engineering
- Electrical (Power) Engineering
- Environmental Sciences
- Food Sciences and Nutrition
- Geology
- Geophysics
- Mathematics
- Mechanical Engineering
- Physics
- Psychology
- Software Engineering
- Statistics
- Media and Communication Studies
- English
- Data Sciences
- Artificial Intelligence
- Cyber Security

==== Bachelor ====
- Architecture
- Design
- Interior design
- Fine Arts

==== PhD ====
- Pharmacy (Pharm-D)

=== Graduate programs ===
==== Department of Computer Science ====
- MS in Computer Science
- MS in Information Security
- MS in Software Engineering
- MS in Artificial Intelligence
- PhD in Computer Science

==== Department of Health Informatics ====
- MS in Health Informatics

==== Department of Electrical and Computer Engineering ====
- MS in Computer Engineering
- MS in Electrical Engineering
- PhD in Computer Engineering
- PhD in Electrical Engineering

==== Department of Chemical Engineering ====
- MS in Chemical Engineering
- MS in Energy & Environmental Engineering
- PhD in Chemical Engineering

==== Department of Civil Engineering ====
- MS in Environmental Engineering
- MS in Civil Engineering

==== Department of Mechanical Engineering ====
- MS in Mechanical Engineering

==== Department of Management Sciences ====
- MS in Management Sciences
- MS in Project Management
- MBA
- PhD in Management Sciences

==== Department of Economics ====
- MS in Economics

==== Department of Development Studies ====
- MS in Development Studies
- MS in Conflict, Peace and Development Studies
- MS in Water, Sanitation, Health and Development
- PhD in Development Studies

==== Department of Humanities ====
- MS in International relations
- MS in English (Linguistic and Literature)

==== Department of Environmental Sciences ====
- MS in Biotechnology
- MS in Environmental Sciences
- PhD in Biotechnology
- PhD in Environmental Sciences

==== Department of Mathematics ====
- MS in Mathematics
- PhD in Mathematics

==== Department of Chemistry ====
- MS in Chemistry
- PhD in Chemistry

==== Department of Pharmacy ====
- MS in Pharmacy
- PhD in Pharmacy

==== Department of Biosciences ====
- MS in Biochemistry and Molecular Biology
- MS in Bioinformatics
- MS in Biosciences
- MS in Microbiology and Immunology
- MS in Molecular Genetics
- MS in Molecular Virology
- PhD in Biochemistry and Molecular Biology
- PhD in Biosciences
- PhD in Microbiology and Immunology
- PhD in Molecular Genetics

==== Department of Meteorology ====
- MS in Meteorology
- MS in Remote Sensing & GIS
- PhD in Meteorology

==== Department of Physics ====
- MS in Physics
- PhD in Physics

==== Department of Earth Sciences ====
- MS in Earth Sciences (Applied Geology/Applied Geophysics

==== Department of Statistics ====
- MS in Statistics
- PhD in Statistics

== Notable alumni ==
- Sadia Bashir - foundress and CEO of PixelArt Games Academy, the first game training academy in Pakistan. She is the first Pakistani to represent at the Game Developer's Conference.
- Asif Bashir - Pakistani Rescue Worker and recipient of Sitara-e-Shujaat, Jeevan Raksha Padak and Kings Gallantry Medal
- Aisha Mughal - Pakistani transgender rights expert and researcher.
