= Aliyar Aliyev =

Azerbaijani officer

- Born: December 14, 1957; Qazyan, Qubadli, Azerbaijan SSR, Soviet Union
- Died: October 3, 1992 (aged 34); Lachin District, Azerbaijan
- Military career
- Allegiance: Republic of Azerbaijan
- Rank: Major
- Conflicts: First Nagorno-Karabakh War
- Awards: National Hero of Azerbaijan; 1992

Aliyar Aliyev (Azerbaijani: Əliyar Yusif oğlu Əliyev; 14 December 1957 – 3 October 1992) was an Azerbaijani officer, a National Hero of Azerbaijan, and a participant in the First Nagorno-Karabakh War.

== Life ==
=== Early life and education ===
Aliyar Aliyev was born on 14 December 1957 in the village Qazyan of Qubadli District. In 1979, he graduated with honors from the Azerbaijan State Physical Culture and Sports Academy and worked as a sports teacher at Dondarli village secondary school in Qubadli District.

After completing his military service, Saransk State University invited him to work as a specialist and Aliyar Aliyev worked for two years at this university. After the death of his father, he returned to Qazyan, worked as a teacher at a secondary school. In 1985 he was elected the Chairman of the Council of Voluntary Society for Physical Culture and Sport.

=== Personal life ===
Aliyev was married and had three children.

== First Nagorno-Karabakh War ==
When the Karabakh war began, Aliyar Aliyev voluntarily joined the ranks of the Azerbaijani Armed Forces. In the war, he was an organizer of a military operation. First, he was appointed the commander of the intelligence division of the battalion, and then the deputy commander of the battalion.

After the first Armenian rallies in Khankendi in February 1988, Azerbaijanis deported from their own homelands and the first refugees were settled in Gubadly, Azerbaijan. In those years, Aliyar Aliyev was the leader of the Popular Movement in Qubadly. In 1992, Aliyar Aliyev was appointed the Commander of the Battalion Intelligence Unit. Aliyar carried out military operations to strengthen the defensive line along the border with Kafan, Goris regions of Armenia and Hadrut district of Azerbaijan. After the capture of Lachin district by the Armenians, Aliyev's battalion began an operation to recapture this area.

On 3 October 1992, Aliyar Aliyev was killed in a fight with Armenian soldiers in the battle on the Shurumbashi Upland of the Lachin district.

== Memorial ==
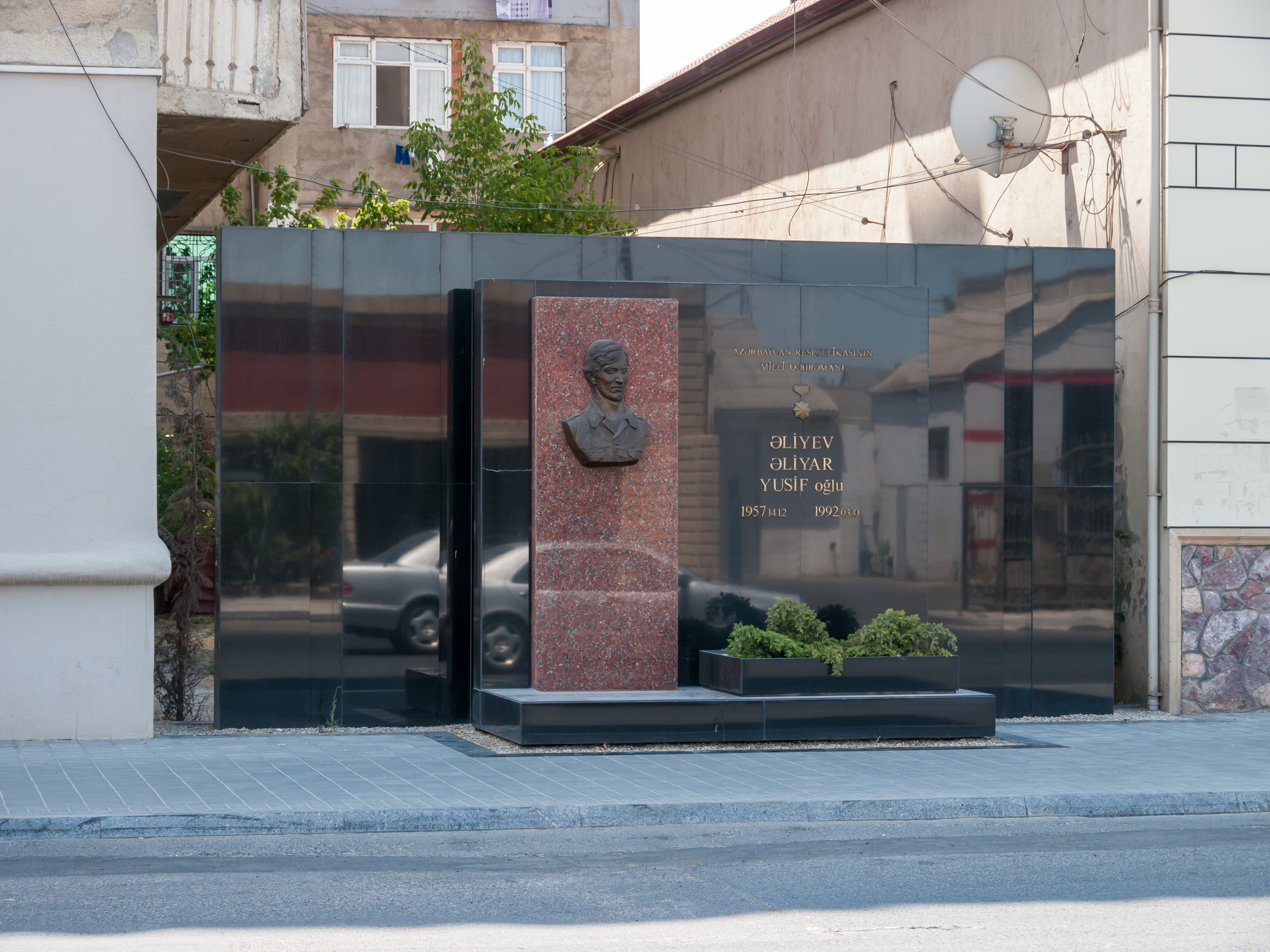
Monument to Aliyar in Baku

Aliyar Aliyev was posthumously awarded the title of "National Hero of Azerbaijan" by the Decree of the President of the Republic of Azerbaijan dated November 10, 1992 No. 301.

One of the streets in Narimanov district of Baku city named after Aliyar Aliyev, where his pedestal is erected.

== Sources ==
- Vüqar Əsgərov. "Azərbaycanın Milli Qəhrəmanları" (Yenidən işlənmiş II nəşr). Bakı: "Dərələyəz-M", 2010, səh. 53.
