= Alikulikyand =

Alikulikyand may refer to:

- Hartashen, Syunik, Armenia
- Əliquluuşağı, Azerbaijan
