= Silali =

Silali may refer to:

- Mount Silali, a dormant volcano in the Great Rift Valley of Kenya
- Seləli, a village in the Qubadli Rayon of Azerbaijan
