= Ləpəhəyranlı =

Ləpəxeyranlı
- Location within Azerbaijan
- Coordinates: 39°23′33″N 46°32′41″E
- Country: Azerbaijan
- Rayon: Qubadli
- Time zone: UTC+4 (AZT)
  - Summer (DST): UTC+5 (AZT)

Ləpəxeyranlı (also, Ləpəhəyranlı, Lepekheyranly, and Lopa-Kheyranly) is a village in the Qubadli Rayon of Azerbaijan.

Ləpəxeyranlı is Azeri village in Qubadli
