= Shahmuradov =

Shahmuradov is a surname. Notable people with the surname include:

- Ilham Shahmuradov (born 1958), Azerbaijani bioinformatician
- Rovshan Shahmuradov (born 1999), Azerbaijani footballer
