= Deşdahat =

- Location within Azerbaijan
- Coordinates: 39°30′01″N 46°41′55″E
- Country: Azerbaijan
- Rayon: Qubadli
- Time zone: UTC+4 (AZT)
  - Summer (DST): UTC+5 (AZT)

Deşdahat (also, Deshtagat, Deshtagat, Razvaliny, and Deyshtagat) is a village in the Qubadli Rayon of Azerbaijan. Deşdahat is the Azeri and Kurdish village in Qubadli
