= Aşağı Xocamsaqlı =

- Location within Azerbaijan
- Coordinates: 39°18′48″N 46°33′12″E
- Country: Azerbaijan
- Rayon: Qubadli
- Time zone: UTC+4 (AZT)
  - Summer (DST): UTC+5 (AZT)

Aşağı Xocamsaqlı (also, Ashaghy Khojamsagly, Aşağı Xocamusaxlı and Ashaghy Khojamusakhly) is a village in the Qubadli Rayon of Azerbaijan.
