= Sadia Bashir =

Pakistani computer scientist

- سعدیہ بشیر
- Born: Faisalabad, Punjab, Pakistan
- Education: COMSATS University (MSc)
- Occupation: Game developer
- Notable work: Founder of PixelArt Games Academy

Sadia Bashir (Urdu: سعدیہ بشیر) is a Pakistani video game developer who is the founder and chief executive officer (CEO) of PixelArt Games Academy.

== Early life and education ==
Sadia Bashir was born into a family where women's education was not prioritised. Determined to study at an English-medium school, she self-funded her education through tutoring and stitching clothes. After enrolling, she struggled to adjust due to her family's socio-economic background and sought refuge in the school library, where she independently explored graphic design, computer science, and gaming. Her interest in gaming began during childhood while playing video games with her brother's friends.

By age 13, Bashir had started designing her own games. She continued working part-time to finance her university education, eventually earning a Bachelor of Science in computer science. She later completed a master's degree in computer science.

== Career ==
Bashir began her career as a programmer before transitioning to game development. With financial backing from a mentor, she and a colleague established a small basement studio to create games.

In 2016, Bashir founded PixelArt Games Academy, an academy focused on game development training, research, and industry collaboration.
