= Seləli =

- Location within Azerbaijan
- Coordinates: 39°11′47″N 46°44′11″E
- Country: Azerbaijan
- Rayon: Qubadli
- Time zone: UTC+4 (AZT)
  - Summer (DST): UTC+5 (AZT)

Seləli (also, Selali and Silali) is a village in the Qubadli Rayon of Azerbaijan.
