= Yuxarı Xocamsaqlı =

- Location within Azerbaijan
- Coordinates: 39°19′03″N 46°33′57″E
- Country: Azerbaijan
- Rayon: Qubadli
- Time zone: UTC+4 (AZT)
  - Summer (DST): UTC+5 (AZT)

Yukhary Khojamsagly (Azerbaijani: Yuxarı Xocamsaqlı) is a village situated in the eponymous administrative-territorial county of Gubadly district of Azerbaijan.

== History ==
According to the "Collection of statistical data on the population of the Transcaucasian region extracted from the family lists of 1886", in the village of Khojamusakhli, part of the Dondarli rural district of Zangazur county, Elizavetpol province, there were 73 households and a population of 524 Tatars (later known as Azerbaijanis), all of whom were Sunni Muslims. Among the villagers, 72 people were beys (landowners), 5 belonged to the clergy, and the remaining 447 were state peasants.

== Toponym ==
To distinguish this village from another village named Khojamusakhli, the village was previously called Mazitli Khojamusahli. Later, the village of Mazitli Khojamusakhli was renamed to Yukhari Khojamusakhli. Khojamusakhli is a distorted version of the name of the "khajaabuiskhakhli" tribe that lived in Zangezur.
