= Energy and environmental engineering =

The Energy and Environmental Engineering field seeks to conserve and maintain the natural environment by using efficient sources of energy. Energy and environmental engineers are continually searching for solutions to emerging, environment-related issues such as erosion, waste disposal, air and water pollution, land resources, human health, and environmental restoration.

Careers in this field focus on improving the built environment, renewable, and traditional energy industries. Industry sectors can range from government, transportation, remediation, waste management, water, sewage, consulting, fossil fuel, construction, and architectural services.

In this field, solar radiation is important and must be understood. Solar radiation affects the Earth's weather and daylight available. This affects not only the Earth's environment but also the smaller internal environments which we create. Energy and environmental engineers acquire knowledge across many disciplines. Energy engineering requires at least an understanding of mechanics, thermodynamics, mathematics, materials, stoichiometry, electrical machines, manufacturing processes and energy systems.

Environmental engineering can be branched into two main areas: internal environments and outdoor environments.

Internal environments may consist of housing or offices or other commercial properties. In this area, the environmental engineering sometimes stands for the designing of building services to condition the internal environment to a comfortable state or the removal of excess pollutants such as carbon dioxide or other harmful substances.

External environments may be water courses, air, land or seas, and may require new strategies for harnessing energy or the creation of treatment facilities for polluting technologies.

This broad degree area covers many areas but is mainly mechanically and electrically biased. It seeks to explore cleaner, more efficient ways of using fossil fuels, while investigating and developing systems using renewable and sustainable resources, such as solar, wind and wave energy.
