= Commission on Science and Technology for Sustainable Development in the South =

Inter-governmental organization

Commission on Science and Technology for Sustainable Development in the South (COMSATS)

- Formation: 4–5 October 1994
- Founder: Abdus Salam
- Type: Intergovernmental Organization
- Headquarters: Islamabad, Pakistan
- Members: 27
- Executive Director: Ambassador Dr. Mohammad Nafees Zakaria
- Website: comsats.org

The Commission on Science and Technology for Sustainable Development in the South (COMSATS) is an inter-governmental organization, having a membership of 27 developing countries from three continents, Latin America, Africa and Asia. Twenty-five S&T/R&D institutions of developing countries are affiliated with COMSATS as members of its Network of International S&T Centers of Excellence for Sustainable Development in the South. The organization aims at sustainable socio-economic uplift of the developing countries through scientific and technological means while adopting North–South and South–South cooperation.

H.E. John Dramani Mahama, the President of Republic of Ghana, is the incumbent chairperson of COMSATS. The Secretariat of COMSATS, permanently located in Islamabad, Pakistan, is headed by an executive director, and supported by the grants from the Government of Pakistan. The current executive director of COMSATS is Ambassador Mohammad Nafees Zakaria.

COMSATS statutory bodies provide meaningful forms for international cooperation. The Commission comprises heads of States/ Governments of Member Countries, and the Consultative Committee comprises the national focal points in Member States, that are Ministries / Government Departments having the portfolio of Higher Education, Science, Technology and Innovation. COMSATS' Network of International S&T Centres of Excellence is represented by the Coordinating Council, which comprises heads of affiliated Centres of Excellence and few ex-officio members. The network is also assisted by the Technical Advisory Committee (comprising senior scientists and technologists from the North and the South). The Coordinating Council elects its chairperson from among its members. Currently, Ashraf Shalan, former president, National Research Centre (NRC), Egypt is the chairperson of COMSATS' Coordinating Council.

== Objectives ==
COMSATS has the following objectives, as outlined in its statutes:

- To sensitize the countries of the South to the centrality of science and technology in the development process, to the adequate allocation of resources for research and development and to the integration of science and technology in the national and regional development plans;
- To support the functioning and activities of the Network of International Science and Technology Centres for Sustainable Development in the South established under this agreement;
- To support other major initiatives designed to promote indigenous capacity-building in science and technology for science-led sustainable development and to help mobilize long-term financial support from international donor agencies and from governments / institutions in the North and the South to supplement the financing of international scientific projects in the South;
- To provide leadership and support for North–South and South–South cooperative schemes in education, training and research; and
- To support the relevant programs and initiatives of major international organizations working for the development and promotion of science and technology in the South.

== History ==
COMSATS was established following a foundation meeting organized by the Government of Pakistan, held on October 4–5, 1994, at the behest of the world-renowned scientist and Nobel Laureate from Pakistan, Prof. Abdus Salam. The Inter-governmental Agreement to this effect was signed in Islamabad, with support of the Ministry of Science and Technology (MoST), Government of Pakistan, The World Academy of Sciences (TWAS) and the Consortium on Science, Technology and Innovation for the South (COSTIS).

== Major programmes and projects ==
COMSATS programmes and projects relate to the socio-economic needs of its member countries. In this context, the organization focuses on:

- Capacity-building through education and training, seminars, symposia, workshops, fellowships and expert-exchange programs;
- Research and development through joint projects in scientific fields, like Information and communication technologies, agriculture, environment, biotechnology, medicinal products, materials sciences, etc.
- Knowledge dissemination through COMSATS publications, web-sites/web-portals;
- Higher education in Science and Technology with the support of COMSATS’ Centres of Excellence and their affiliated institutions in the member countries.

== Ongoing projects ==
- COMSATS University Islamabad (CUI)
- COMSATS Internet Services (CIS)
- COMSATS Tele-Health Services
- COMSATS Joint Centre for Industrial Biotechnology (CCIB)
- COMSATS Centre for Climate and Sustainability (CCCS)

== International collaboration ==
Keeping in view the common goals of building and promoting indigenous capacities in science and technology for science-led development, COMSATS has signed a number of Memoranda of Understanding (MoU) with various ministries, international organizations and academic institutions, to effectively conduct developmental initiatives. Also, the organization has close working relations with various development and donor agencies, such as UNESCO, ISESCO, TWAS/TWNSO, COMSTECH, ICGEB, South Centre, IOFS, etc.

== Membership ==
As of April 2023 the following are listed as members of COMSATS:

- Bangladesh
- People's Republic of China
- Colombia
- Egypt
- The Gambia
- Ghana
- Iran
- Jamaica
- Jordan
- Kazakhstan
- Morocco
- Nigeria
- North Korea
- Pakistan
- Palestine
- Philippines
- Senegal
- Somalia
- Sri Lanka
- Sudan
- Syria
- Tanzania
- Tunisia
- Turkey
- Uganda
- Yemen
- Zimbabwe
