= Raheel Qamar =

Pakistani scientist and educator

Raheel Qamar (born 14 January 1962) is a Pakistani scientist and academic whose research has focused on biochemistry, molecular biology, human genetics, genomics and biotechnology. He has held academic and administrative positions in Pakistan and abroad and has served as Rector of COMSATS Institute of Information Technology and Rector of COMSATS University Islamabad.

Qamar became interim rector of COMSATS in 2017 after the position became vacant. His tenure subsequently received coverage in the Pakistani press in connection with the university's leadership and the appointment of a permanent rector. In September 2025, he was among three candidates shortlisted by the university Senate for the permanent rector position. In October 2025, the Ministry of Science and Technology notified his appointment as Rector of COMSATS University Islamabad for a five-year term.

Qamar has also worked internationally in science and higher education. He served as Head of the Science and Technology Sector at the Islamic World Educational, Scientific and Cultural Organization (ICESCO) in Rabat, Morocco. In this role, he participated in initiatives concerning scientific cooperation, artificial intelligence, higher education and science diplomacy.

His scientific research has included human population genetics and disease genetics. He was a co-author of a study on Y-chromosomal DNA variation in Pakistan published in the journal Human Genetics in 2002. His later research has included genetic studies of diseases affecting Pakistani populations and other areas of human molecular genetics.

Qamar has also been involved in scientific research leading to patented technology. In 2020, Pakistani researchers associated with COMSATS University Islamabad received a United States patent for a microfluidics-based device intended for therapeutic drug monitoring, with Qamar among the researchers involved in the work.

Qamar is a Fellow of the Pakistan Academy of Sciences and a recipient of the Tamgha-i-Imtiaz. The Pakistan Academy of Sciences lists him as a Fellow elected in 2009 and records his academic background in biochemistry and molecular biology.
