= Əliquluuşağı =

- Location within Azerbaijan
- Coordinates: 39°26′53″N 46°28′20″E
- Country: Azerbaijan
- District: Qubadli
- Time zone: UTC+4 (AZT)
  - Summer (DST): UTC+5 (AZT)

Əliquluuşağı (Aliguluushaghy) is a village in the Qubadli District of Azerbaijan.
