= Transgender Persons (Protection of Rights) Act, 2018 =

Constitution of Pakistan

Government of Pakistan
- Enacted by: Government of Pakistan
- Enacted: 2018
- Enacted by: Parliament of Pakistan
- Commenced: 2018
- Administered by: Health Ministry
- Status: In force

The Transgender Persons (Protection of Rights) Act, 2018 is a law in Pakistan which was enacted by the parliament in 2018 to legally provide equality to transgender people and to safeguard their rights. The law aims to legally recognise transgender people in the country. It also allows them to legally have the same rights as cisgender people.

In March 2020, the International Court of Justice (ICJ) addressed the provision of Pakistan after releasing a paper at International Transgender Day of Visibility. The ICJ highlighted features of the provision. Pakistan, according to the Aljazeera, is one of the first nations that legally recognised transgender people.

== Background ==
=== Transgender population ===
The total population of transgender people in 1998 was 10,418. In 2015, the Health ministry indicated that the number of transgender people in the country is nearly 150,000.

=== Violence against transgender people ===
Transgender people are regular targets of violence in the country. Between 2015 and September 2020, 68 transgender people were killed in Pakistan, and 1,500 were sexually assaulted in multiple incidents. In 2018, transgender people reportedly experienced 479 violence incidents in Khyber Pakhtunkhwa.

== Objectives ==
- Transgender people may obtain a driving licence and passport
- Transgender people may change their gender in the National Database & Registration Authority (NADRA) records on their own discretion
- Harassing a transgender person at home or in a public place is prohibited
- Discrimination of transgender people either educationally or socially is prohibited
- Allows government to establishment safe houses, and to provide medical and educational facilities to transgender people. It also allows government to establish centers to provide them psychotherapy
- Allows government to establish separate rooms for transgender people at jails
- A person may be punished with a 6 months jail and PKR50,000 penalty for forcibly employing a transgender person for panhandling purpose.

== Effectiveness of the Law ==
The Trans Protection Act is not the first time such government provisions to protect the rights of Trans people were taken, as the Supreme Court of Pakistan declared that trans peoples were equal to non-transgender Pakistani citizens in 2010. This declaration of equality should have entitled trans peoples to equal job opportunities, education, and exempted them from discrimination. However, none of these things actually happened since the declaration, as in the last census roughly 40% of transgender peoples reported being illiterate, and the largest sources of income for trans peoples in Pakistan are dancing and sex work.

Due to the lack of penal nature for the Trans Protection Act, it has only served the same function that the aforementioned Supreme Court declaration did, and has only offered trans people formal equality and not substantive equality. The only penalty mentioned throughout the entire law is against gurus who incentivize their chenas to beg. The lack of penalties give the law no teeth, and there is no genuine incentive for the citizens to follow the law, and no infrastructure or concrete punishments in place to enforce it. This is present especially on the topic of education, as the law states that if a trans person meets the admission requirements for a school then their gender cannot be a deciding factor on their admittance to that school. This addresses the actual admittance processes that correlate with getting into a school, the law does not address the social stigmas and customs that make it extremely difficult for a trans person to meet these acceptance goals in the first place. The law also does not address many pressing issues to the trans community which include hate crimes against trans people, and proper healthcare for trans people.

== Opposition ==
In 2022, transgender rights law debated again after four years in Senate Standing Committee on Human Rights. Senator Mushtaq Ahmed Khan of Jamaat-e-Islami, the initiator of the amendment bill, believes that the establishment of a medical board is necessary to determine the gender of transgender people.
