= Victor V. Solovyev =

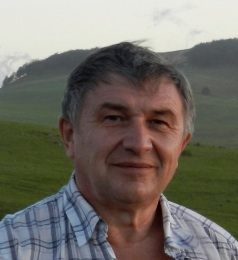
- Scientific career
- Fields: Computational biology, Bioinformatics
- Institutions: Softberry Inc. King Abdullah University of Science and Technology (KAUST)(KSA); Royal Holloway College, London University (UK); Joint Genomic Institute, Lawrence Berkeley National Lab; EOS Biotechnology Inc. (USA); Sanger Centre (UK); Baylor College of Medicine, Amgen Inc., Supercomputer Center, Florida State University (United States); ITBA (Milan, Italy) Institute of Cytology and Genetics (Russia)
- Thesis: (1985)
- Academic advisors: Professor Vadim Ratner
- Website: www.molquest.kaust.edu.sa

Victor V. Solovyev (Russian: Виктор Владимирович Соловьёв) is the chief scientific officer of Softberry Inc. He was previously a professor of computer science in the Computer, Electrical and Mathematical Sciences and Engineering Division at King Abdullah University of Science and Technology (KAUST) (2013-2015) and in the Department of Computer Science at Royal Holloway College, University of London (2003-2012). He was on the editorial board of Mathematical Biosciences and was a founder of Softberry Inc..

== Research ==
Solovyev works with developing statistical approaches, machine learning algorithms, computational platforms and bioinformatics tools for high-throughput biological big data analysis. He is interested in genome structural and functional annotation and applying it for rational design of biological systems.

== Education ==
Solovyev received Ph.D. in genetics from Russian Academy of Sciences in 1985 and M.S. in physics from Novosibirsk State University in 1978.

== Career ==
Solovyev joined KAUST in 2013 as Professor in the Computer, Electrical and Mathematical Sciences and Engineering Division. He had previously been a professor of Computer Science in the Department of Computer Science, Royal Holloway College, London University (2003-2012). He was the genome annotation group leader in the Joint Genomic Institute, Lawrence Berkeley National Lab (2003) and was the director of bioinformatics at EOS Biotechnology (1999-2002). He was a leader of the computational genomics group at the Sanger Centre in Cambridge, UK (1997-1999). He also held positions as assistant professor at Baylor College of Medicine, computational scientist at Amgen Inc., visiting scientist at Supercomputer Center, Florida State University, visiting professor at ITBA (Milan, Italy) and a group leader at the Institute of Cytology and Genetics in Novosibirsk, Russia.

== Software developing ==
About 100 software applications implemented as standalone programs or combined in pipeline or packages, have been developed under his guidance. Many of these programs are available for the academic community to run on-line or for downloading. Scientific community actively uses these applications. For example, the Fgenesh eukaryotic gene identification program has been used or cited in more than 3,000 scientific publications, according to Google scholar data. The Fgenesb bacterial genome annotation pipeline based on Markov chain models was significantly superior to other approaches, in gene finding in bacterial community sequences. MolQuest is the most comprehensive, easy-to-use desktop application for sequence analysis and molecular biology data management.

== Other interests ==
Besides bioinformatics, his interests include cryptography and information security. FendoffF an application to encrypt passwords, files or images that uses several original encryption methods, was developed for iOS and Android as well as for desktop computers. He also developed the Wild West Chess computer game.
