= Qubadli District =

District in southwestern Azerbaijan

Coordinates: 39°16′N 46°32′E

- District
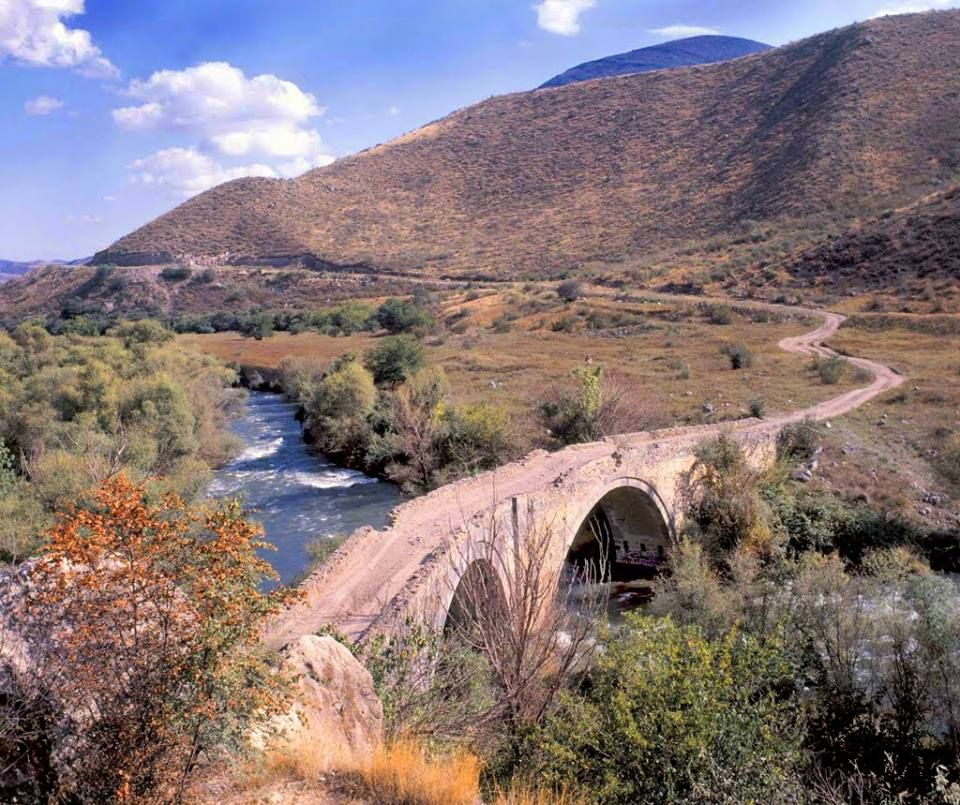
- Lalazar Bridge

- Map of Azerbaijan showing Qubadli District
- Country: Azerbaijan
- Region: East Zangezur
- Established: 14 March 1933
- Capital: Qubadli
- Settlements: 94

Government
  - Governor: Malik Isayev

Area
  - Total: 800 km^{2} (310 sq mi)

Population (2020)
  - Total: 41,600
  - Density: 52/km^{2} (130/sq mi)
- Time zone: UTC+4 (AZT)
- Postal code: 3900
- Website: qubadli-ih.gov.az

Qubadli District (Azerbaijani: Qubadlı rayonu) is one of the 66 districts of Azerbaijan. It is located in the south-west of the country and belongs to the East Zangezur Economic Region. The district borders the Lachin, Khojavend, Jabrayil and Zangilan districts, and the Syunik Province of Armenia.

Its capital and largest city is Qubadli. As of 2020, the district had a nominal population of 41,600.

== History ==
The region was part of the Kurdistansky Uyezd and later the Kurdistan Okrug in the Azerbaijani SSR from 7 July 1923 to 23 July 1930. To its Kurdish population, it was known as Qûbadlî.

The district was established on 14 March 1933.

The district came was seized by the breakaway Republic of Artsakh in August 1993 during the First Nagorno-Karabakh War. Azerbaijani forces regained control of all of the district during the 2020 Nagorno-Karabakh war.

== Demographics ==
According to the last Soviet census of 1989, the population was 28,110. According to undated Azerbaijani data, the population was 34,100.

As of 1979, there were a total of 26,673 people:

- Azerbaijanis 99,5% (26,537)
- Russians 0,2% (45)
- Armenians 0,1% (26)

As of 1989 there were a total of 28,110 people.

== Notable people ==
- Ilham Shahmuradov (born 1958) Bioinformatician

== See also ==
- Armenian-occupied territories surrounding Nagorno-Karabakh
- Kashatagh Province

== Gallery ==
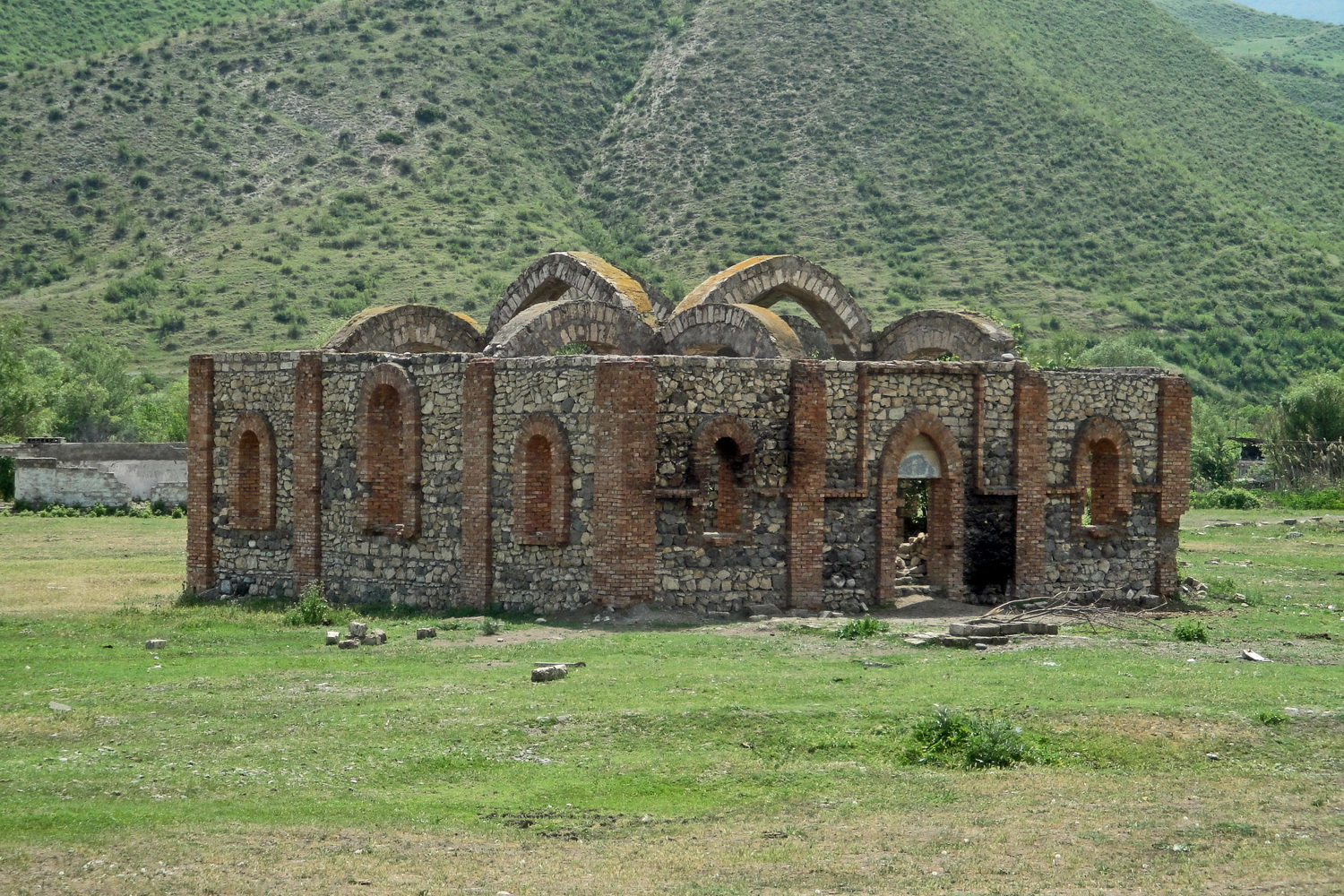
Qubadli, building

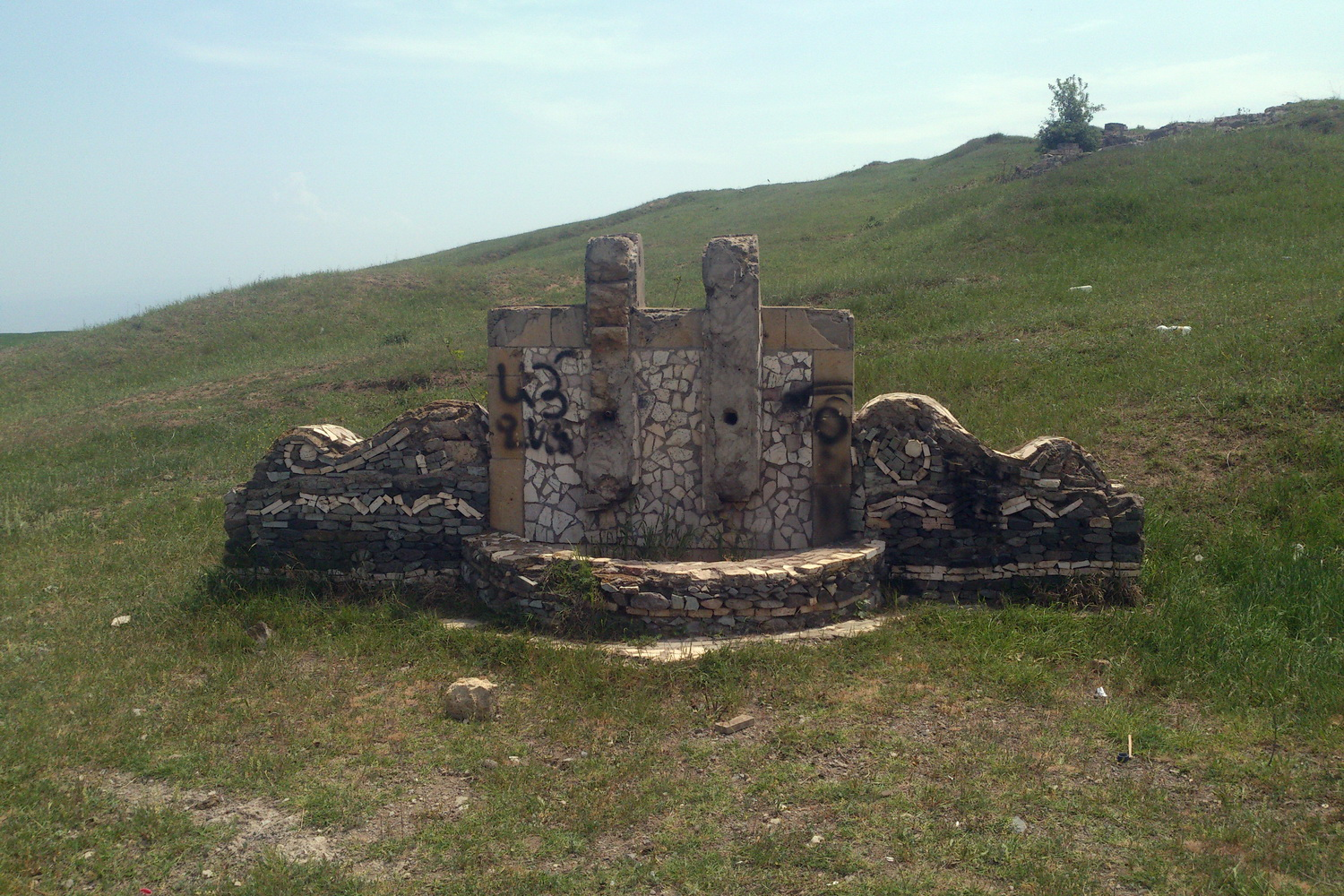
Qubadli, Memorial spring
