= 2016 Nagorno-Karabakh conflict =

April 2016 conflict in the territory of Nagorno-Karabakh

- Part of Nagorno-Karabakh conflict
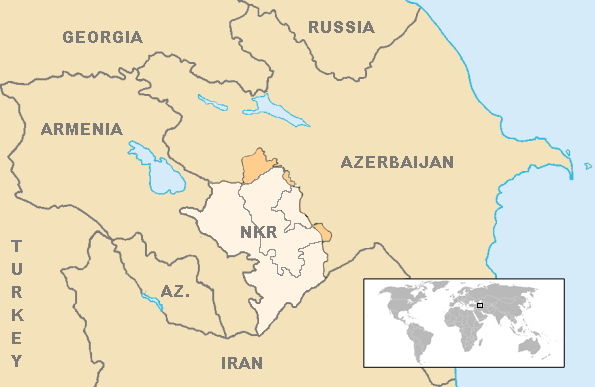
- Republic of Nagorno-Karabakh including Armenian-occupied territories surrounding Nagorno-Karabakh Territory claimed by the Republic of Nagorno-Karabakh but controlled by Azerbaijan
Date	1–5 April 2016 (4 days)
Location	Nagorno-Karabakh line of contact
Result	Inconclusive (see aftermath); Azerbaijan claims victory; Armenia claims to have successfully repelled the Azerbaijani offensive
Territorial changes	The line of contact shifted for the first time since 1994; Azerbaijan captures a territory from 800 hectares (8.0 km^{2}) to 2,000 hectares (20 km^{2}), including 2 heights

Belligerents
Artsakh; Armenia	Azerbaijan

Commanders and leaders
(Republic of Artsakh) Bako Sahakyan (Republic of Artsakh) Levon Mnatsakanyan (Armenia) Serzh Sargsyan (Armenia) Seyran Ohanyan (Armenia) Yuri Khatchaturov	(Azerbaijan) Ilham Aliyev (Azerbaijan) Zakir Hasanov (Azerbaijan) Najmeddin Sadikov (Azerbaijan) Hikmat Hasanov (Azerbaijan) Polad Hashimov

Units involved
Artsakh Defence Army; Armenia Armed Forces	Azerbaijan Armed Forces

Casualties and losses
Per Armenian sources: 91 troops killed (11 non-combat), 123 wounded; 9 civilians killed, 6 wounded; 14 tanks destroyed; Azerbaijani claim: 560 soldiers killed, 500 wounded; 33 tanks and armoured vehicles, 25 artillery pieces destroyed	Per Azerbaijani sources: 31–94 soldiers killed, 2 missing, 39 wounded; 6 civilians killed, 26 wounded; 1 Mi-24 helicopter and 1 drone lost; 1 tank destroyed; Armenian claim: 300–1,500 soldiers killed, 2,000–2,700 wounded; 2 helicopters, 14 drones shot down; 26 tanks, 4 IFVs, 1 AEV, 1 MRL destroyed

The 2016 Nagorno-Karabakh conflict, also known as the Four-Day War, (Note: Armenian: Քառօրյա պատերազմ, romanized: K’ařorya paterazm, IPA: [kʰɑroɾjɑ pɑtɛɾɑzm]; Azerbaijani: Dördgünlük müharibə) April War, (Note: Armenian: Ապրիլյան պատերազմ, romanized: Aprilyan paterazm) or April clashes, (Note: Azerbaijani: Aprel döyüşləri) began along the former Nagorno-Karabakh line of contact on 1 April 2016 with the Artsakh Defence Army, backed by the Armenian Armed Forces, on one side and the Azerbaijani Armed Forces on the other.

The clashes occurred in a region that is disputed between the self-proclaimed Republic of Artsakh and the Republic of Azerbaijan. The region includes the former Soviet Nagorno-Karabakh Autonomous Oblast and the surrounding districts of Azerbaijan under the control of Armenian forces at the time. Azerbaijan claimed to have started a military operation to prevent purported continuous Armenian shelling of civilian areas in Azerbaijan. However, there was no evidence of Armenian shelling. Until the 2020 Nagorno-Karabakh war, the clashes were the worst since the 1994 ceasefire agreement signed by Artsakh, Azerbaijan and Armenia.

A ceasefire was reached on 5 April between Azerbaijan and Armenia in Moscow. The Nagorno-Karabakh authorities also welcomed the oral agreement. After the agreement, both sides accused each other of violations. Azerbaijan claimed to have regained 20 km^{2} (7.7 sq mi) of land, while Armenian officials suggested a loss of 8 km^{2} (3.1 sq mi) of land of no strategic importance. However, the International Crisis Group reported that those heights were of strategic importance.

Officially, Baku reported the loss of 31 servicemen without publishing their names. Armenian sources claimed much higher numbers varying between 300 and 500. The Ministry of Defence of Armenia reported the names of 92 military and civilian casualties, in total. The US State Department estimated that a total of 350 people, both military and civilian, had died. Official sources of the warring parties put those estimates either much higher or much lower, depending on the source.

== Background ==
The First Nagorno-Karabakh War ended with a ceasefire agreement between the warring parties that came into effect on 12 May 1994. Violations of the ceasefire occurred periodically in the following years, with notable escalations in 2008 and 2010, but incidents especially increased since 2014. According to the International Crisis Group, there were 60 deaths total, both military and civilian, in 2015 alone because of breaches of the ceasefire. The April 2016 clashes were the most serious breach of the 1994 ceasefire until 2020.

Among the possible reasons behind the escalation of the conflict was the worsening economy of Azerbaijan. The collapse of oil prices in 2015–16 have been frequently cited, with clashes being used to distract the Azerbaijani population from rising prices and unemployment. Alternatively, some Armenian sources blame Turkey for provoking violence. Some Turkish commentators have suggested a Russian strategy to destabilize the region.

Azerbaijan has been openly preparing for offensive operations against Nagorno Karabakh for several years, as evidenced by the continuous massive military buildup, as well as the Azerbaijani authorities' numerous statements in favor of a military solution to the conflict. Thus, on 23 March 2015, Azerbaijan's Minister of Defence stated that the Azerbaijani military had accumulated the necessary weaponry to destroy 70 percent of opposing forces in a first strike. In February 2016, US Director of National Intelligence James Clapper warned that Azerbaijan's military buildup combined with deteriorating economic conditions was increasing the risk of an escalation in 2016.

On 19 March 2016, President Aliyev stated: "To resolve the conflict, in the first place it is necessary for our country and army to become even stronger. A lot is being done in this direction. Today, we have gained full advantage on the line of contact." Furthermore, in his speech, president Aliyev openly accused the Minsk Group Co-Chairs of provocation against Azerbaijan and had stated that Azerbaijan's confidence in their activities had been completely undermined.

== Combat operations ==
The fighting was focused mainly on the front line with a length of 257 km. Each side blamed the other for the outbreak of clashes around the towns of Martakert, Tartar, Aghdam, Martuni, and Fuzuli. According to Armenian sources, on the night of 1 April and early morning of 2 April, the Azerbaijani side launched large-scale attacks along the contact line between Karabakh and Azerbaijan. On 2 April, a 12-year-old Armenian boy was killed as a result of missile artillery attack from a BM-21 Grad near the border with Martuni. Two other children were wounded as well. On 2 April, Azerbaijani positions and inhabited places near the front line came under fire from Armenian military, armed with mortars and high caliber grenade launchers, that killed 2 people and wounded 10 civilians. According to the Azerbaijani Ministry of Defence, during a rapid counter-offensive, the Armenian side's front defence line was broken in multiple places and several strategic heights and inhabited places were retaken (including the strategically important hill of Lalatapa). An AFP journalist confirmed that the Lalatapa heights were also under Azerbaijani control. The Azerbaijani side claimed that they had captured some areas, including heights near the village of Talysh, as well as the village of Seysulan. an unmanned aerial vehicle of Armenia was claimed to be shot down in Fuzuli as well. On 8 May the Armenia's First Channel release footage from military positions near Seysulan. 14,400 people living in villages were affected by clashes, but no internal displacement or immediate humanitarian need was reported. Armenian Ministry of Defence spokesman Artsrun Hovhannisyan sharply accused Azerbaijan of launching an unprovoked coordinated ground offensive against Armenia's forces, saying the Azerbaijani military used warplanes, tanks and artillery to try to make inroads into Nagorno-Karabakh. During the first day of fighting, Armenian forces claimed to have destroyed at least three Azerbaijani tanks, two military helicopters (including an Mi-24 and at least one armed Mil Mi-8/17) and two unmanned drones, photographs and videos of which surfaced on the internet. Armenian frontline positions were reinforced, heavy artillery was brought forward, and in the capital Stepanakert reservists were called up.

On 3 April, Armenian military authorities announced that Artsakh Defence Army forces had recaptured positions around Talysh, On 6 April, news footage shown on Armenia's First Channel revealed Armenian journalists and NKR troops freely mingling on the streets of Talysh and Madagiz. On 8 April, news footage shown on an Azerbaijani TV channel showed the Azerbaijan military installations purported to be near the Talysh heights. On 11 April, news footage from Armenia's First channel showed the Talysh heights under the control of Artsakh troops. Again on 8 May, news footage from Civilnet showed journalist Tatul Hakobyan with some NKR soldiers at Talysh heights near Naftalan. Later, Defence Minister Zakir Hasanov stated that if shelling of Azerbaijani settlements by Armenian forces did not cease, Azerbaijan would consider launching an artillery bombardment on Stepanakert. On the same day, the Azerbaijani Ministry of Defence announced a unilateral end to hostilities. The Azerbaijani Ministry of Defence stated that should Armenian shelling pursue, Azerbaijan would continue its offensive.

On 4 April, the Azerbaijani Ministry of Defence reported that an Armenian command and control center had been destroyed and released a video which captured footage of the attack. On 5 April, a strategically important military base in Madaghis which is on the main road leading to Aghdara city and a bus carrying "Yerkrapah" Armenian volunteers were fired. The Azerbaijani Ministry of Defence claimed that along with numerous military personnel, two high-ranking Armenian officers were killed as a result. The same day, the Armenian defence ministry announced that an Azerbaijani drone, identified as an Israeli-made IAI Harop, attacked a bus carrying Armenian volunteers enlisting in military service to the Nagorno-Karabakh town of Martakert by slamming itself against it, killing seven people aboard including the heads of two rural communities within the NKR. It is believed to be the first ever combat use of the drone anywhere. An Israeli-made ThunderB surveillance drone was shot down on 2 April according to the Artsakh defence force. Armenian officials later protested Israel's supply of weaponry to Azerbaijan. Some Azerbaijani sources claimed that Madagiz was under Azerbaijani control, citing Azerbaijan Ministry of Defence but Armenian side reported this to be false. Later, the Armenian side published a video to prove that Madagiz remained in their control.

On 5 April, the Azerbaijani Ministry of Defence claimed that the mutual ceasefire agreement, which was agreed upon in Moscow by the heads of Azerbaijan's and Armenia's militaries, was breached by Armenian forces which shelled Azerbaijani positions near Tap Qaraqoyunlu with 60, 82 and 120 mm mortars.

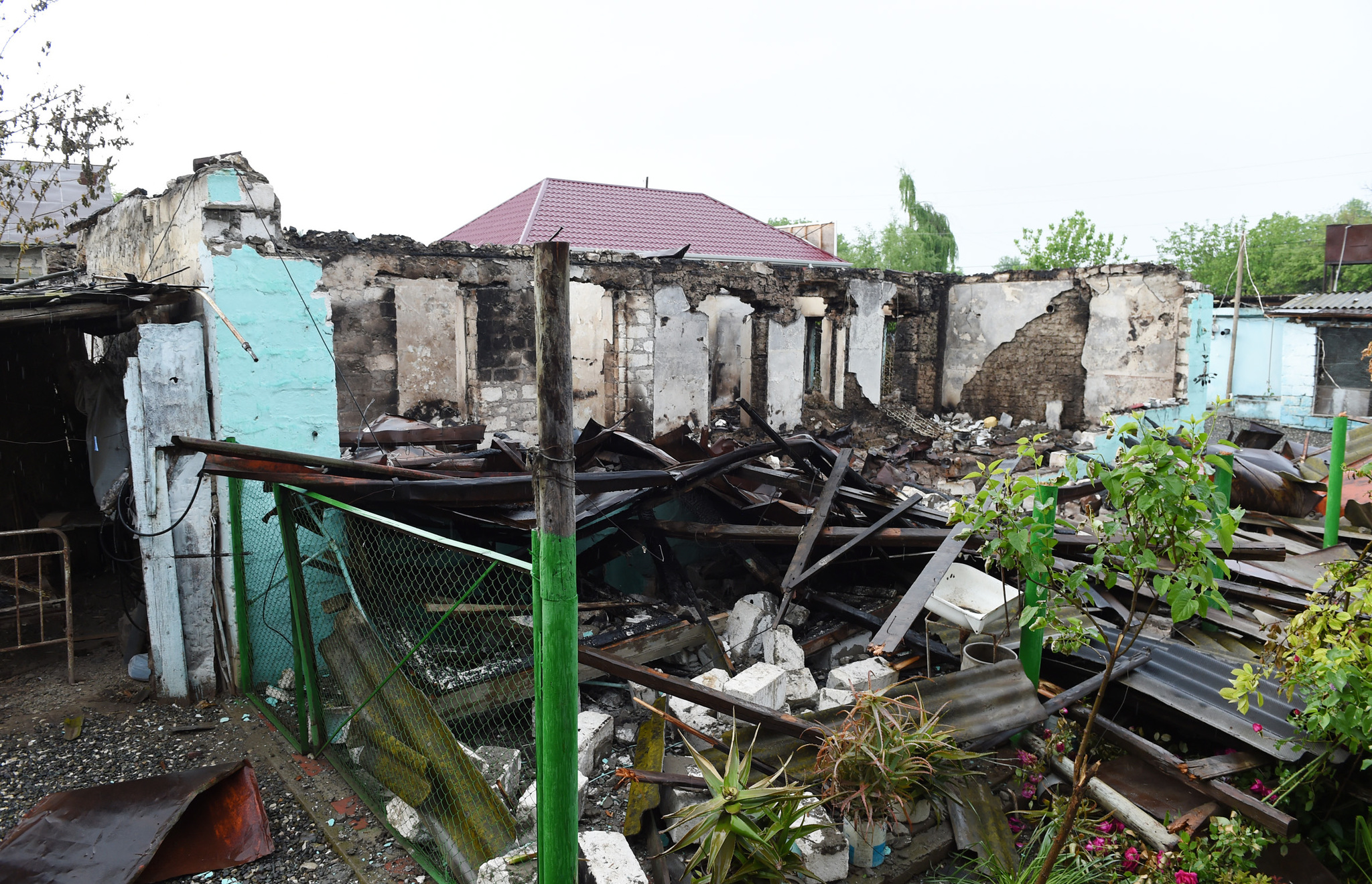
Damaged houses in Makhrizli village, Agdam District. 1 May 2016

According to Azerbaijani claims, Armenian Armed Forces directed high caliber artillery fire at a mosque (in Ahmadaghaly, one civilian dead), schools (in Seydimli, one schoolboy injured) and residential buildings as well as civilian infrastructure. Damage to houses in Azerbaijan by Armenian artillery fire was reported in the Russian press. According to Azerbaijan, on 7 April, Armenian armed forces shelled an ambulance evacuating injured Azerbaijani civilians in the Aghdara-Goranboy area. Also, according to the Azerbaijani Ministry of Defence, on 7 April, an Armenian "X-55" style drone was shot down by Azerbaijani forces while trying to fly over the frontline. The Ministry of Defence of the Artsakh Republic published some aerial photos to prove that Azerbaijan deploys military units near populated areas and violated the Article 52 of Geneva Convention. During a BBC visit to Azerbaijan's side of frontline, a team of BBC journalists asked to see and ensure where the alleged military objects are placed but the Azerbaijani Ministry of Defence refused for "safety reasons". On 8 April, artillery fire was exchanged between Armenian and Azerbaijani forces, with the Armenians reporting two soldiers killed. A temporary ceasefire agreement mediated by the International Committee of the Red Cross and field assistants of the OSCE, allowed for both sides to collect dead and missing soldiers. On 14 April, the Azerbaijani government reported that one of its soldiers had been killed by Armenian forces on the line of contact. On 15 April, Nagorno-Karabakh reported one of its soldiers had been killed in action with Azerbaijani forces. A soldier of the Nagorno-Karabakh military was reported killed in action with Azerbaijani forces on 19 April. Further skirmishes occurred on 21 April, killing another Nagorno-Karabakh soldier.

=== Claims of atrocities and usage of prohibited munitions ===
According to Armenian officials, residents of Talysh and Madagiz had been evacuated and provided with shelter in other parts of the region. Armenian and international reporters announced that after Talysh was retaken by Armenian troops, an elderly Armenian couple had been found shot in their home and their corpses had been mutilated. According to these reports, Azerbaijani soldiers also killed another elderly woman. Photographs of corpses with ears cut off revived memories of the atrocities of the 1988–1994 war, observed a Le Monde reporter. According to the Russia's leading human rights lawyer, the head of the International Protection Centre Karinna Moskalenko, complaints about these facts of violence against the civilian population are already prepared to be sent to the European Court of Human Rights.

On 4 April, it was reported that Azerbaijani forces decapitated the body of a Yazidi-Armenian soldier, Kyaram Sloyan, who had been killed in action, with videos and pictures of his severed head posted on social networks. According to The Sunday Times, it included "shocking souvenir photos of uniformed Azerbaijani soldiers posing with the severed head". Sloyan's body was buried without its head on 5 April 2016, in his native village of Artashavan. On 8 April, through the mediation of the Red Cross, the Azerbaijani side returned Sloyan's head. Sloyan was interred for a second time the following day, to lay his head with his body. According to Regnum News Agency and KavNews Russian agency, during his visit to Terter, Agdam and Barda districts, President of Azerbaijan Ilham Aliyev awarded the Azerbaijani soldier who allegedly posed with the severed head of Sloyan. Armenian Deputy Foreign Minister Shavarsh Kocharyan condemned the encouragement of the Azerbaijani serviceman who was depicted on another photo where the mutilated head of Sloyan was manifestly shown.

On 8 April, Artak Beglaryan, a spokesperson for the NKR Prime Minister, posted a photo on his Twitter account showing the beheaded corpse of an Armenian soldier. He called the beheading in a Tweet a "barbaric act & Daesh/ISIS style war crime." According to the public report of the Human Rights Defender (ombudsman) of Artsakh, "the facts of beheading [of] Hayk Toroyan, Kyaram Sloyan, and Hrant Gharibyan by the Azerbaijani troops, as well as the torturing and mutilation of 18 Artsakh army members constitute grave breaches of customary international law".

Relatives of three Armenian soldiers killed and beheaded during the escalation filed a complaint against Azerbaijan to the European Court of Human Rights. The plaintiffs demanded to recognize the case of inhumane treatment with regard to the bodies, lack of respect for their privacy, and discrimination based on nationality.

In April 2016 the European Ombudsman Institute issued a statement that condemns any violation of human rights regarding civilians and attacks on civilian objects in Nagorno-Karabakh. According to their statement, "civilian citizens of Nagorno-Karabakh were inhumanly treated without any respect and by that offended in their dignity". "We are concerned by the information received, that peaceful civilians were killed in the Nagorno-Karabakh settlements through partly cruel and inhuman methods of execution. All these operations constitute gross violations of human rights; they are opposed to European human rights and human values; they significantly endanger the European system for the protection and promotion of human rights".

Representatives of the Parliamentary Assembly of the Council of Europe stated their intentions to report the beheadings and other human rights violations allegedly conducted by Azerbaijan to the Council of Europe Commissioner for Human Rights. The co-rapporteurs said: "We are going to submit a report to the Council of Europe Commissioner for Human Rights on the fact of murdering and beheading of a conscript, and then publicizing it."

HALO Trust reported that Azerbaijan had dropped rocket-dispensed cluster bombs around civilian settlements in NKR.

On 17 May 2016 Azerbaijani Ministry of Foreign Affairs stated that on 11 May the Armenian military had used 122-mm calibre white phosphorus munitions prohibited by the Convention on Certain Conventional Weapons against Azerbaijani civilians and civilian objects. On 11 May, Azerbaijan's Defense Ministry jointly with the Foreign Ministry invited military attaches from 13 countries to visit the territory in the Askipara village where the Defense Ministry claims to have found a white phosphorus munition fired by Armenian forces. The usage of phosphorus munition by the Armenian military was also reported by Al Jazeera. Azerbaijani Military Prosecutor's Office initiated a criminal case upon the finding. NKR foreign ministry and Armenia defence ministry dismiss it as a falsification and distortion of the reality. Armenian media sources disclaimed it as a staged operation by Azerbaijan, citing absence of evidence of the presence of a shell or of a shell being used by Armenians, adding that this is a non-story as there is no evidence of any prohibited use.

=== Transfer of bodies ===
On 10 April, the State Commission on Prisoners of War, Hostages and Missing Persons of the Nagorno-Karabakh Republic said that of the 18 bodies of Armenian soldiers transferred that same day by Azerbaijan, all showed signs of torture or mutilation. The commission called these acts "a flagrant manifestation of inhumanity, run counter to the laws and customs of war and are in grave violation of the international humanitarian law", adding that the Karabakh side will ensure that "such behavior of the Azerbaijani side is condemned in strongest terms by the international community and the specialized agencies". Azerbaijan's Ministry of Defence denied the accusations and claimed that the transferred bodies of Azerbaijani servicemen had been mutilated by the Armenian side. The NKR State Commission on Prisoners of War, Hostages and Missing Persons called this claim by Azerbaijan a cynical attempt to mislead the international community, observing that before the start of the exchange procedure, all the bodies of the dead soldiers had been examined in the presence of representatives of the International Committee of the Red Cross, and no traces of abuse or ill-treatment had been discovered or registered on Azerbaijani soldiers.

== Aftermath ==
=== Casualty estimates ===
According to the US State Department, Azerbaijan "took a huge number of casualties, including comparatively", although the number was not specified. Overall, a senior member of the US State Department estimated 350 casualties on both sides, including civilians.

Official estimates of the warring parties are far apart from each other. According to official statements of the involved sides, 91 Armenian and 31 Azerbaijani soldiers were killed during the clashes, and several pieces of military equipment from both sides were destroyed. Also according to official statements, fifteen civilians (9 Armenian and 6 Azerbaijani) were killed in the conflict. Azerbaijani Defence Minister Zakir Hasanov declared that 560 Armenian servicemen were killed during the clashes and Armenian casualties were 10 times higher than Azerbaijani casualties. Hasanov claimed these figures were pronounced by the Armenian parliamentary commission which was established to investigate April clashes.

Various non-official Azerbaijani sources, per research of social networks, put the actual number of Azerbaijani soldiers killed at 94, while two remain missing.

According to Christoph Bierwirth, UNHCR representative in Armenia, more than 2,000 people left Nagorno-Karabakh for Armenia amid the clashes.

In 2017, dozens of servicemen of the Azerbaijani army were arrested and tortured and accused of spying for Armenia. Azerbaijani military expert, retired colonel Isa Sadigov said that the combat losses over these four days showed that "the country is not ready and not able to conduct military operations." Terter region (where mass torture took place a year later) is located in close proximity to the line of contact between the warring parties. The expert believes that the “Terter case” itself appeared due to the desire of the command to “hide its shortcomings” during the April 2016 battles.

=== Analysis ===
There has been no conclusive assessment on the outcome of the clashes. Neil Melvin, director of the armed conflict and conflict management programme at the Stockholm International Peace Research Institute, stated that "Azerbaijan suffered heavy losses for relatively minor territorial gains, this is nonetheless seen as a victory, after 25 years of a sense of having been defeated".

Several analysts noted that the clashes did not result in significant changes. Matthew Bodner wrote in The Moscow Times on 6 April that "the previous status quo has been more-or-less preserved." Independent Armenian journalist Tatul Hakobyan, who visited the frontline during the clashes, remarked that the death of scores of soldiers of both sides was "senseless" as no real change occurred. He stated: "Azerbaijan did not win and Armenia did not lose." Russian military expert Vladimir Yevseyev said that the Azerbaijani offensive, despite the initial victory, was not a success because the Azerbaijani side has numerous killed soldiers and destroyed tanks.

The International Crisis Group assessment stated that Azerbaijan gained "small but strategically important pieces of land". Russian military analyst Pavel Felgenhauer believes that Azerbaijan "won the first round of fighting". Former Minister of Defence of the breakaway Nagorno-Karabakh Republic Samvel Babayan stated that the territories gained by Azerbaijan have strategic importance, and that Armenia lost these territories within one hour. The governments of Armenia and Nagorno-Karabakh rejected his criticism.

Chatham House fellow Zaur Shiriyev suggested that Azerbaijan prompted a "carefully controlled escalation [that] served to raise international awareness of the fragility of a status quo which Azerbaijan regards as unfavourable, in order to galvanize the international mediators and put pressure on Yerevan to be constructive at the negotiating table." British journalist Thomas de Waal, senior associate at the Carnegie Endowment for International Peace and author of Black Garden: Armenia and Azerbaijan Through Peace and War, does not believe that the Azerbaijani offensive was meant as a full-scale military operation but rather as a limited attempt to bring the conflict back on the international agenda and put Armenia under pressure. He believes that after the April violence, the conflict is unlikely to return to its semi-quiet state and that a new round of fighting would be harder to contain than previous conflicts.

Christine Philippe-Blumauer noted, "Russian official reactions suggest that Russian troops would not actually decide to intervene in favor of the Armenian side, should the conflict scale-up to a fully-fledged war yet again."

According to one analysis, the conflict highlighted the sidelining of the OSCE Minsk Group, which has a mandate to mediate negitations between Armenia and Azerbaijan, and its replacement by Russian mediation. The OSCE Minsk Group organized a meeting only several days after the beginning of the fighting, and by that time the parties had already come to a ceasefire agreement in Moscow.

Following the conflict, Russia started to increase political and economic ties with both Azerbaijan and Armenia. In Yerevan, Gazprom agreed to increase gas supply to Armenia, and decreased the price of gas, which was already low. In Baku, Russian foreign minister Sergei Lavrov had a discussion about a railway line from Russia to Iran through Azerbaijan. Dmitry Rogozin, then deputy prime minister of Russia, said that Moscow is the biggest supplier of arms to both sides and will continue to be so in the future. People who worked on the settlement process said that none of the sides would have trust in a permanent peace established by Russia alone. As the former US ambassador to the Minsk Group Matthew Bryza puts it, "The key to resolving this is to get the two presidents to have sufficient trust in each other, and Russia is not going to be able to do that".

=== Official statements ===
Armenian

Armenian Ministry of Defence Spokesman Artsrun Hovhannisyan stated that the Azerbaijani attempted to take part of northern Karabakh with a "blitzkrieg", which failed. After a ceasefire was reached NKR Defence Army Colonel Victor Arustamyan said that one military position was left under Azerbaijani control, which was of no strategic significance.

On 24 April President Serzh Sargsyan acknowledged that Azerbaijani troops had taken very small pieces of land in the north and south of the contact line, which he said had no strategic importance for Armenian forces, who had not attempted to reclaim them to avoid additional loss of life. On 17 May Sargsyan stated that the Armenian side had lost control of "800 hectares of land having neither tactical nor strategic importance".

On 26 April 2016 Sargsyan fired 3 senior Armenian army officials, including the chiefs of the Logistics, the Intelligence and the Communications Departments, a move which was apparently influenced by the public criticism of the high death toll among the Armenian soldiers.

President Sargsyan stated that Armenia would formally recognize the independence of Nagorno-Karabakh "if the military operations continue and acquire a large scale." On 5 May 2016 the Government of Armenia approved the bill on recognition of the independence of the Nagorno-Karabakh Republic. It was announced, that the recognition of the independence of the Nagorno-Karabakh Republic is "due to the results of discussions between Armenia and Nagorno-Karabakh, [and] considering further developments, including external factors."

Azerbaijani

Azerbaijani President Ilham Aliyev initially claimed the clashes were a "great victory" for Azerbaijan.

Azerbaijani Ministry of Defence claimed that the Azerbaijani armed forces remain in control of strategic heights near the village of Talysh. Responding to Sargsyan's claim on the Armenian troops' loss of 800 ha of territory, Azerbaijani Ministry of Defence stated that the Azerbaijani military took control of 2000 hectares of territory. In the opinion of analyst Rizvan Huseynov, an article posted on the website of the state oil company owned media CBC claimed, "Nearly 5% of occupied territories returned" (nearly 57,290 hectares of territory).

Azerbaijani opposition websites say Azerbaijan long-serving chief of general staff Najmaddin Sadigov may be replaced over 4-day war by the First Corps Commander and deputy Nizami Osmanov, but this was refuted by the Ministry of Defence spokesman.

=== Military awards ===
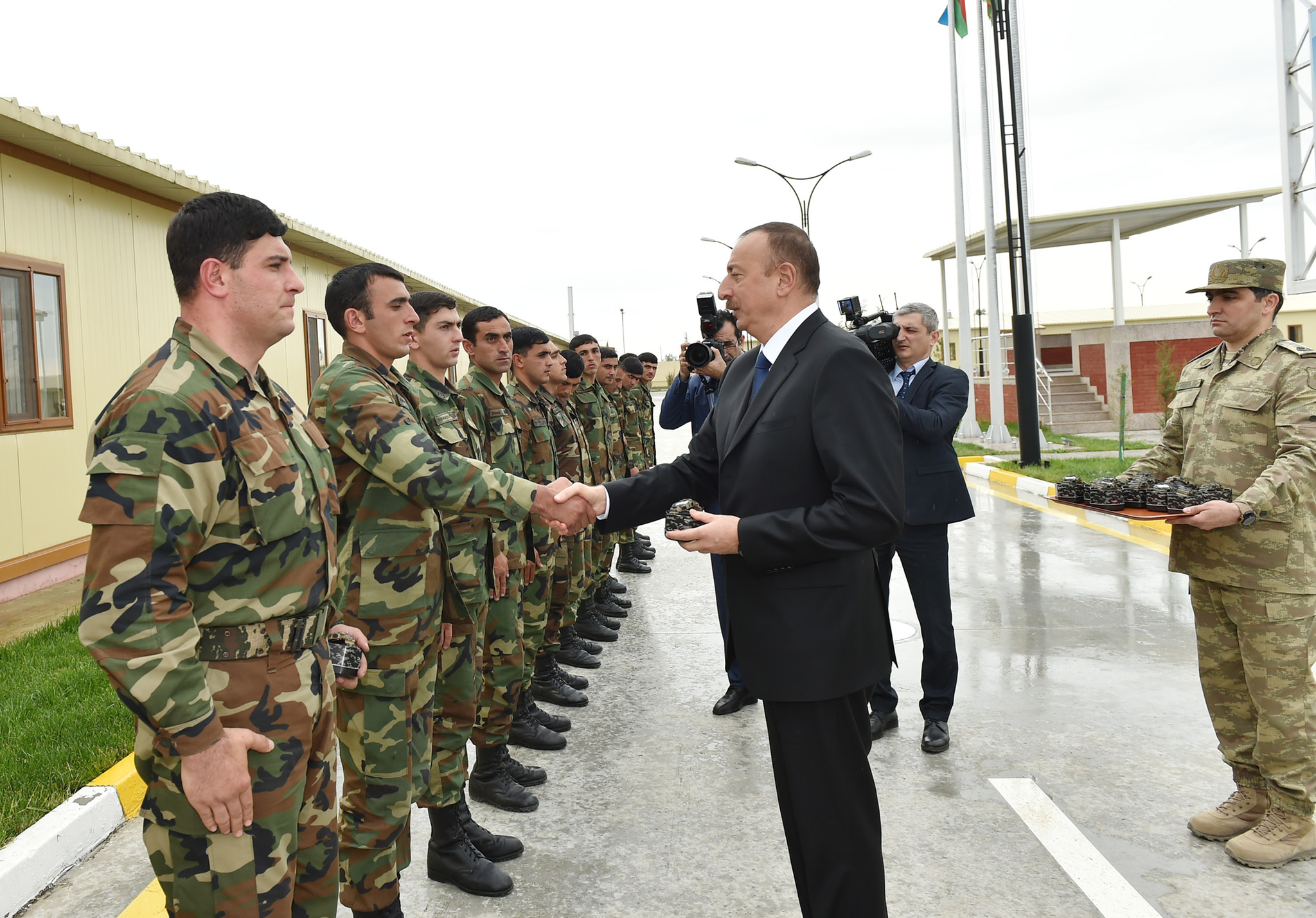
Azerbaijani President Ilham Aliyev gives awards to the serviceman of the military unit in Tartar district. 1 May 2016

A number of Armenian military servicemen were awarded with orders and medals in Armenia and the Nagorno-Karabakh Republic. Junior sergeant Robert Abajyan was posthumously awarded with Hero of Artsakh which is the highest honorary title of NKR. He became the youngest person ever to hold the title at 19 years old.

On 19 April 2016, Azerbaijani President Ilham Aliyev signed orders on awarding honorary titles, orders and medals to a group of Azerbaijani military servicemen. Among them, Lieutenant Colonel Shukur Hamidov, Lieutenant Colonel Murad Mirzayev and Major Samid Imanov were awarded with the medal of National Hero of Azerbaijan. Colonel Mais Barkhudarov was awarded with the rank of general-major by the Azerbaijani President because of his personal participation in the military operation to take the heights of Lalatapa.

=== Political harassment ===
Ali Karimli, the leader of Azerbaijani Popular Front party, who criticized the Azerbaijani government over its actions during the clashes, became a subject of a series of protests (the latest one held on 12 April in front of Karimli's house), organized by the authorities. The protesters demanded that Karimli be exiled from the country. According to human rights lawyer Intigam Aliyev, attacks against Karimli are "diverting attention from truly important issues and testing technologies to distract people's justified anger caused by the serious consequences of wrong decisions."

Russian TV channel TV Rain reported that the Azerbaijani authorities launched a criminal case against journalists of the Azerbaijani independent channel Meydan TV because of the publication of the list of Azerbaijani soldiers killed during the clashes in Nagorno-Karabakh. Their list consisted of 94 names, while the Ministry of Defence of Azerbaijan confirmed only 31 deaths. According to the Meydan TV chief editor Emin Milli, each person on their list really died in the clashes, and he stated that the Ministry of Defence of Azerbaijan could not deny this information.

=== Societal reactions ===
The societal reactions to the April clashes were different in Armenia and Azerbaijan. In Azerbaijan, the clashes surged patriotism in the public, and thousands of people volunteered to fight, yet the Ministry of Defence did not allow them to do so. Even people with the critical voice could not hide their surprise at the intense and quick social mobilization. For this reason, the declaration of the ceasefire on 5 April led to a sense of disappointment in the public.

According to conflict expert Laurence Broers, reactions to the outbreak of violence were more "sombre" in Armenia. Following the ceasefire, demonstrations took place in Yerevan, which were caused by the anti-Russian attitudes that objected to Moscow's arms sales to Baku. Even though the Armenian officials firstly emphasized the effective performance of the Armenian army, there was a growing public disappointment about the complacency and corruption in the army. Out-of-date equipment and poor communication lines were believed to be the cause for the death of many Armenian soldiers within the first few hours of the clashes. After the declaration of the ceasefire, four high-ranking army officials were dismissed from their position.

Rumors circulated following the war that Armenian president Serzh Sargsyan had agreed to territorial concessions to Azerbaijan. Nationalist politician and war veteran Jirair Sefilian formed a "resistance committee" to oppose such concessions before being arrested on 20 June 2016. In July 2016, armed gunmen demanding the release of Sefilian and the ruling out of any territorial concessions in Nagorno-Karabakh took over a police station in Yerevan, triggering a two-week hostage crisis.

=== Later statements and investigations ===
Since leaving office in 2018, former Armenian president Serzh Sargsyan has made a number of statements about the 2016 clashes. In August 2020, Sargsyan asserted that Armenia had won the Four-Day War and stated that "despite some minor shortcomings, almost all military, political, state and civilian parties did their best during the hostilities." He acknowledged that Armenian military intelligence had failed to detect the Azerbaijani offensive in advance. He also stated that he declined to order a counterattack to retake the territory lost to Azerbaijan during the war in order to avoid further Armenian casualties.

The Armenian parliament formed a commission to investigate the circumstances of the 2016 war in June 2019. Among the people called to testify before the commission were president Serzh Sargsyan, former defense minister Seyran Ohanyan and former Artsakh Defence Army commander Levon Mnatsakanyan, former NKR president Bako Sahakyan, and former foreign minister Eduard Nalbandyan, as well as officers and soldiers. The commission found that rumors that the Armenian side had suffered from shortages in ammunition, food and fuel during the war were false. The full findings of the commission were kept secret.

In November 2020, then speaker of the parliament of Artsakh Arthur Tovmasyan stated that, following the April War, Serzh Sargsyan met with former NKR president Bako Sahakyan and 22 parliamentarians urging them to accept the return of the seven Armenian-controlled districts of Azerbaijan surrounding Nagorno-Karabakh, which the NKR representatives refused. In a February 2021 interview, Serzh Sargsyan stated that he was ready to accept a compromise solution to the Nagorno-Karabakh conflict involving the return of districts surrounding Nagorno-Karabakh and attempted to remain in power after 2018 to realize this solution. Responding to Sargsyan's statements, Secretary of the Security Council of Armenia Armen Grigoryan claimed in an interview that the April War had been stopped because Serzh Sargsyan made promises regarding the return of the Armenian-controlled districts, but that he had delayed the return using the 2016 hostage crisis and the 2017 Armenian constitutional changes as reasoning, creating "serious problems" for the succeeding government .

== International reactions ==
=== Supranational bodies ===
- EU – High Representative of the European Union for Foreign Affairs and Security Policy Federica Mogherini urged the parties "to stop the fighting immediately and observe the ceasefire".
- UN – Secretary General Ban Ki-moon demanded all sides involved in the conflict to immediately cease all armed hostilities and observe the terms of ceasefire.
- EU – European Parliament. In April 2016 a debate on the escalation of tension on the Nagorno Karabakh - Azerbaijan borders took place in the European Parliament. The majority of the Members of the European Parliament urged both parties to stop the military escalation and resume the peaceful negotiations. Several MEPs urged Azerbaijan to install mechanism for monitoring cease-fire violations on the line of contact already accepted by Armenia.
- PACE – President of the Parliamentary Assembly of the Council of Europe Pedro Agramunt, called on both sides to respect the ceasefire and resume peaceful negotiations. He also called for the withdrawal of all Armenian armed troops from occupied Azerbaijani territories in compliance with the UN Security Council resolutions. In 2017 in the report entitled “The Azerbaijani Laundromat” published by the Organized Crime and Corruption Reporting Project as result of investigative journalism, Agramunt was mentioned to be benefiting from Azerbaijani scheme of money laundering. Furthermore, he played a key role in rigging various votes at PACE in favour of Azerbaijan. Pedro Agramunt has resigned for Azerbaijan-linked corruption, accepting money, vacations, jewelry, watches and prostitutes as a bribe from Azerbaijan.
- OIC – The Organisation of Islamic Cooperation condemned "the attack by Armenian forces on the borders of occupied Azerbaijani territories" and Yerevan's "disrespect of the unilateral ceasefire" announced by Baku.
- CSTO – A spokesman for the head of the CSTO, Nikolay Bordyuzha, stated that the conflict must be settled through negotiations. Bordyuzha added that the Azerbaijani side is "leading to the escalation of the situation and the conflict".

=== OSCE Minsk Group and co-chair countries ===
- OSCE Minsk Group – The Co-Chairs of the OSCE Minsk Group expressed "grave concern over the reported large-scale ceasefire violations that are taking place along the line of contact in the Nagorno-Karabakh conflict zone" and strongly condemned "the use of force and regret the senseless loss of life, including civilians". The OSCE Minsk Group scheduled to have a meeting on 5 April 2016 in Vienna over the incidents.
- Russia – President Vladimir Putin called on both sides to end hostilities and show restraint. On 4 April Foreign Minister Sergey Lavrov criticized what he called Turkey's interference into the internal affairs of neighboring nations and called Turkey's strong support for Azerbaijan "one-sided".
- United States – The State Department condemned ceasefire violations and urged the sides to "show restraint, avoid further escalation, and strictly adhere to the ceasefire." Their statement continued, "The unstable situation on the ground demonstrates why the sides must enter into an immediate negotiation under the auspices of the OSCE Minsk Group Co-Chairs on a comprehensive settlement of the conflict. We reiterate that there is no military solution to the conflict. As a co-chair country, the United States is firmly committed to working with the sides to reach a lasting and negotiated peace."

=== Other states ===
- Belarus – The Ministry of Foreign Affairs urged the parties to continue seeking a peaceful solution to the conflict "in accordance with the generally recognized principles and norms of international law, first of all, on the basis of respect and guaranteeing of the sovereignty, territorial integrity and inviolability of borders, as well as the relevant UN Security Council resolutions and decisions of the OSCE". The Belarusian ambassador to Armenia was summoned to be informed that Yerevan was "deeply bewildered" by this statement which "does not correspond to the spirit of the Armenian-Belarusian relations" and "is detrimental to the negotiation process". Belarusian president Alexander Lukashenko insisted that both sides should seek a peaceful dialogue.
- Bulgaria – Foreign Ministry of Bulgaria has expressed deep concern about "massive violations of the ceasefire". Bulgaria reiterated its position that the conflict could only be solved through peace talks mediated by the OSCE Minsk Group.
- Canada – Minister of Foreign Affairs Stéphane Dion called on all sides to show restraint, immediately return to a true ceasefire, and actively resume dialogue within the framework of OSCE Minsk Group. "Canada firmly believes that there is no alternative to a peaceful, negotiated solution to this conflict," Minister Dion said in a statement.
- Chile – Initially the Chamber of Deputies of Chile issued a resolution passed unanimously that condemned the "armed attack of Azerbaijan against the Nagorno Karabakh Republic". According to the resolution, "on the night of 1 to 2 of last April, ground forces and air of the Republic of Azerbaijan conducted a large-scale attack on the border with the Republic of Nagorno-Karabakh, with heavy artillery and last generation missiles". The Chamber of Deputies of Chile reaffirmed its commitment to peace and urged the Republic of Azerbaijan for the immediate cessation of all acts of war against the Republic of Nagorno-Karabakh and the strict observance of the truce signed by both countries in 1994. However, just two weeks later, the Senate of Chile, followed by the same Chamber of Deputies, adopted resolutions reaffirming Chile's recognition of Azerbaijan's territorial integrity, acknowledging the democratic progress in the country and calling on the international community to assist Azerbaijan and Armenia in resolving the conflict on the basis of the UN Security Council resolutions 822, 853, 874 and 884.
- Czech Republic – Foreign Ministry expressed concern over extensive violations of the ceasefire on the line of contact of Nagorno-Karabakh conflict and condemned the use of force. It called to involved parties to stop the violence and to strictly respect the truce. Foreign Ministry supported the peaceful efforts of the OSCE Minsk Group.
- Cyprus – Foreign Ministry statement accused Azerbaijan of violations of the armistice line and urged Azerbaijan to "respect the status quo ante." It also urged Turkey to "refrain from any activities and statements that further destabilize the unfolding situation."
- Georgia – Prime Minister Giorgi Kvirikashvili expressed concern over the recent developments in the region and expressed hope that the international community's efforts will help to de-escalate the situation. President Giorgi Margvelashvili called on both neighbors to end fighting in Nagorno-Karabakh region and resolve the conflict peacefully. According to a Russian news website Defence Minister Tinatin Khidasheli reaffirmed Georgia's support of its neighbours territorial integrity in a telephone call with her Azerbaijani counterpart Zakir Hasanov. However no such official statement was made by the Defence Ministry of Georgia.
- Germany – Foreign Minister Frank-Walter Steinmeier called on both sides to immediately stop fighting and to fully respect the ceasefire.
- Greece – The Foreign Ministry expressed concern and called on the two sides to "exercise restraint and composure in order to return, as soon as possible, to the process of dialogue within the framework of the Minsk Group."
- Iran – Foreign Ministry Spokesman Hossein Jaberi Ansari called for both sides to "refrain from any manner or action" which could "worsen the situation." He added that Iran recommends cessation of hostilities by reaching a peaceful solution within the framework of United Nations regulations, while he further underlined that, as the region has been the scene of "destructive actions" by extremist groups, such clashes arose "severe concerns" for Iran.
- Kazakhstan – The Ministry of Foreign Affairs expressed its concern with the recent escalation of violence and called on the parties to abide by the ceasefire agreement. A summit of the Eurasian Economic Union in Yerevan was cancelled after Kazakhstan refused to attend it in an apparent show of support for Azerbaijan.
- Kyrgyzstan – The Ministry of Foreign Affairs expressed its concern with the worsening situation in Nagorno-Karabakh. It said that it stands for working out constructive proposals on searching for ways of resolving the dispute and that it is ready to mediate the settlement of the conflict.
- Latvia – The Ministry of Foreign Affairs called on both sides to stop the hostilities immediately and resume the ceasefire, expressing regret over the casualties and deaths and conveying condolences to the families of those killed.
- Norway – Minister of Foreign Affairs Børge Brende called the clashes an "unacceptable military escalation".
- Pakistan – Pakistan's Foreign Ministry issued a statement expressing concern about the escalation "caused due to the continuous artillery firing by Armenian forces." It added, "Pakistan will continue to promote a peaceful resolution of the Nagorno-Karabakh conflict." Secretary to president, Ahmad Farooq, said Pakistan "always stands by Azerbaijan" and that "Azerbaijan is a brotherly and friendly country."
- Poland – The Ministry of Foreign Affairs of Poland called on parties of conflict to cease military operations in region and return to peace talks initiated in 1994. The ministry stated that the territorial dispute should only be resolved through diplomatic and political negotiations, including the OSCE Minsk group mediation format.
- Romania – The Foreign Ministry of Romania expressed concern over the escalation in Nagorno Karabakh and urged an immediate cessation of hostilities. The ministry stated that "Resumption of diplomatic efforts is necessary for peaceful settlement."
- Turkey – President Recep Tayyip Erdoğan called his Azerbaijani counterpart Ilham Aliyev to pay condolences for the "martyred" soldiers. The Turkish Ministry of Foreign Affairs issued a statement condemning what they claimed was an Armenian attack on civilians and calling on Armenia to comply with the ceasefire. He also announced his country's support to Azerbaijan in the Nagorno-Karabakh border clashes, saying that Turkey supports Azerbaijan "to the end" against Armenia". Turkey also sought support for Azerbaijan from the Organization of Islamic Cooperation. In another statement, Recep Tayyip Erdoğan stated that the passivity of the OSCE Minsk Group led the situation to this point.
- Ukraine – According to a statement by the Foreign Ministry of Ukraine "Ukraine favors a long-term political solution to the Nagorno-Karabakh conflict on the basis of respect for the sovereignty and territorial integrity of the Republic of Azerbaijan within its internationally recognized borders". According to the ministry "The current situation eloquently shows that frozen conflicts remain a hotbed of instability across the OSCE space, which could flare up any moment and lead to large-scale hostilities and a great loss of human life". President Petro Poroshenko, in a phone conversation with his Azerbaijani counterpart, said that Ukraine supports Azerbaijan's integrity within internationally recognized borders.
- United Kingdom – Minister for Europe David Lidington expressed concern about the increased violence and urged both sides "to engage constructively and intensively in the search for a negotiated peaceful settlement through the Minsk Group process."

Partially recognized non-UN member states

- Foreign Ministers of the partially recognized states of Transnistria, Abkhazia, and South Ossetia expressed their support to the authorities and people of Nagorno-Karabakh.

Other reactions

- U.S. Congressmen and co-chairs of the Congressional Caucus on Armenian Issues Frank Pallone (D-NJ), Robert Dold (R-IL), Adam Schiff (D-CA), and Brad Sherman (D-CA) jointly condemning what they described as "Azerbaijan's aggression" and called upon the Obama administration to "hold Ilham Aliyev to account for his unilateral escalation of violence against Nagorno-Karabagh." In a separate statement, Congressman Jim Costa (D-CA) called upon Azerbaijan to "reverse its pattern of escalating violence against the peaceful people of Nagorno Karabakh".
- The Basque Parliament adopted a statement condemning the Azerbaijani attempts to solve the Karabakh conflict by military means. The statement notes that on 2 April 2016, Azerbaijan unilaterally launched an unprecedented attack on Nagorno-Karabakh which has caused dozens of deaths, including four civilians, one of them a child. The Basque Parliament also declared its support for the Minsk Group negotiation process and stated that Nagorno-Karabakh must have a place at the negotiating table.
- Selahattin Demirtaş, leader of the left-wing pro-Kurdish Peoples' Democratic Party (HDP), criticised Turkish President Recep Tayyip Erdoğan and Prime Minister Ahmet Davutoğlu for encouraging violence with their support for military actions. He added, "Nagorno-Karabakh was an autonomous region. Armenia and Azerbaijan had to settle the issue around the negotiating table, as war will be of no benefit to either side."
- Parliamentarians of the Greek and Latvian Parliaments, Garifalia Kanelli and Sergejs Potapkins respectively, visited the Nagorno-Karabakh Republic after the clashes. Potapkins stated that it is inadmissible when the peaceful population suffers from military aggression, and that the re-establishment of peace is a priority, and that escalations of the conflict do not promote the establishment and maintenance of peace.
- A large number of French parliamentarians, senators and mayors in a joint statement announced that the Republic of Nagorno-Karabakh should be readmitted to the negotiating table. According to them, "encouraged by international indifference, Azerbaijan under the rule of Ilham Aliyev attempted to regain by force its former colony, the Republic of Nagorno Karabakh", deliberately targeting cities, killing children in the courtyard of their schools, and maiming civilians.
- On 12 April, 21 French parliamentarians and senators signed a joint statement: "While the cease-fire obtained by the Minsk Group has already been undermined by the Azerbaijani side, the French authorities must point out that any continuation of the fighting will lead to unilateral recognition of the Nagorno-Karabakh Republic".
- 30 French parliamentarians have appealed to the French government to recognize the Nagorno-Karabakh Republic. French conservative Senator Valérie Boyer accused Azerbaijan for the violence and expressed solidarity with the Armenian people and Nagorno-Karabakh. She also called for the official recognition of the NKR by France.
- Frank Engel, a Member of the European Parliament and Honorary Consul of Armenia in Luxembourg, called for the recognition of Artsakh's independence, to avoid repetition of the Armenian genocide. He accused Azerbaijan of aggression in Karabakh earlier in April, which showed that some people living on the Caspian Sea shore dream of a new genocide in Nagorno Karabakh.
- Charles Tannock, British Member of the European Parliament accused Azerbaijan of a full-scale mobilization of its forces along the contact line. He suggested that both sides should resume talks under the auspices of OSCE Minsk Group.
- Eleni Theocharous, a Member of the European Parliament from Cyprus insisted that sanctions should be imposed on Azerbaijan for attacking civilians in Nagorno Karabakh. She also stated that the European Union has the obligation to support the people of Nagorno Karabakh as they are fighting to protect their homes and their freedom.
- Angel Dzambazki, a Member of the European Parliament from Bulgaria accused Azerbaijan of opening fire on Armenians right before the commemoration of the Armenian genocide. He also stressed the fact that Azerbaijan refused to install an investigative mechanism suggested by the OSCE Minsk group in 2015. The MEP suggested that it is unacceptable for an "EU partner," in this case Azerbaijan, to violate human rights and commit violence.
- U.S. Congressmen David Cicilline (D-RI), James Langevin (D-RI), Jack Reed (D-RI) condemned the Azerbaijani military operation against Karabakh in three separate statements. In his statement, Reed said: "These attacks on the Armenian people are completely unacceptable and call into question the sincerity with which Azerbaijan has approached recent peace negotiations." While Cicilline stated: "I strongly condemn the use of sniper attacks by the Azerbaijani government, which is in direct violation of the cease-fire agreement and international law, and am appalled by reports that Azerbaijan forces attacked a Red Cross envoy."
- The Los Angeles City Hall was lit in the colors of the Armenian flag in reaction to the violence. A vigil was also held to promote a peaceful resolution to the conflict and to condemn Azerbaijan for "outrageous militarization and vicious attacks", as stated by Paul Krekorian, one of the organizers of the vigil.
- Turkish human rights activist Sait Çetinoğlu noted the support of Turkish authorities to Azerbaijan and called it a policy when the "genocide is exported out of borders of the state".
- US Congresswoman Loretta Sanchez, a senior member of the House Armed Services Committee, called for a "Leahy Law" investigation into reports that the Azerbaijan armed forces, which annually receive millions of dollars in US military aid, committed gross violations of human rights during Baku's 2 April offensive against Nagorno-Karabakh.
- US Senators Bill Barton and Lois Tochtrop condemned human rights violations by Azerbaijan as war crimes. According to them, "One heartbreaking account of barbaric actions during the four-day war in April was the mutilated elders that journalists found in Talysh after its recapture from Azerbaijani forces". Another violation was that "among the Azerbaijani officers Aliyev honored at a ceremony following the four-day war was the man who had posed with [Yezidi-Armenian soldier] Sloyan's severed head."
- Israel's former minister of defence Avigdor Lieberman called upon the OSCE Minsk Group to be more objective in resolving this conflict. He accused Armenia of fueling the conflict and described the position of Azerbaijan in the conflict as "balanced" and "absolutely justified".

== See also ==
- Nagorno-Karabakh conflict
- Armenia–Azerbaijan relations
