= Azerbaijanis who went missing during the First Nagorno-Karabakh War =

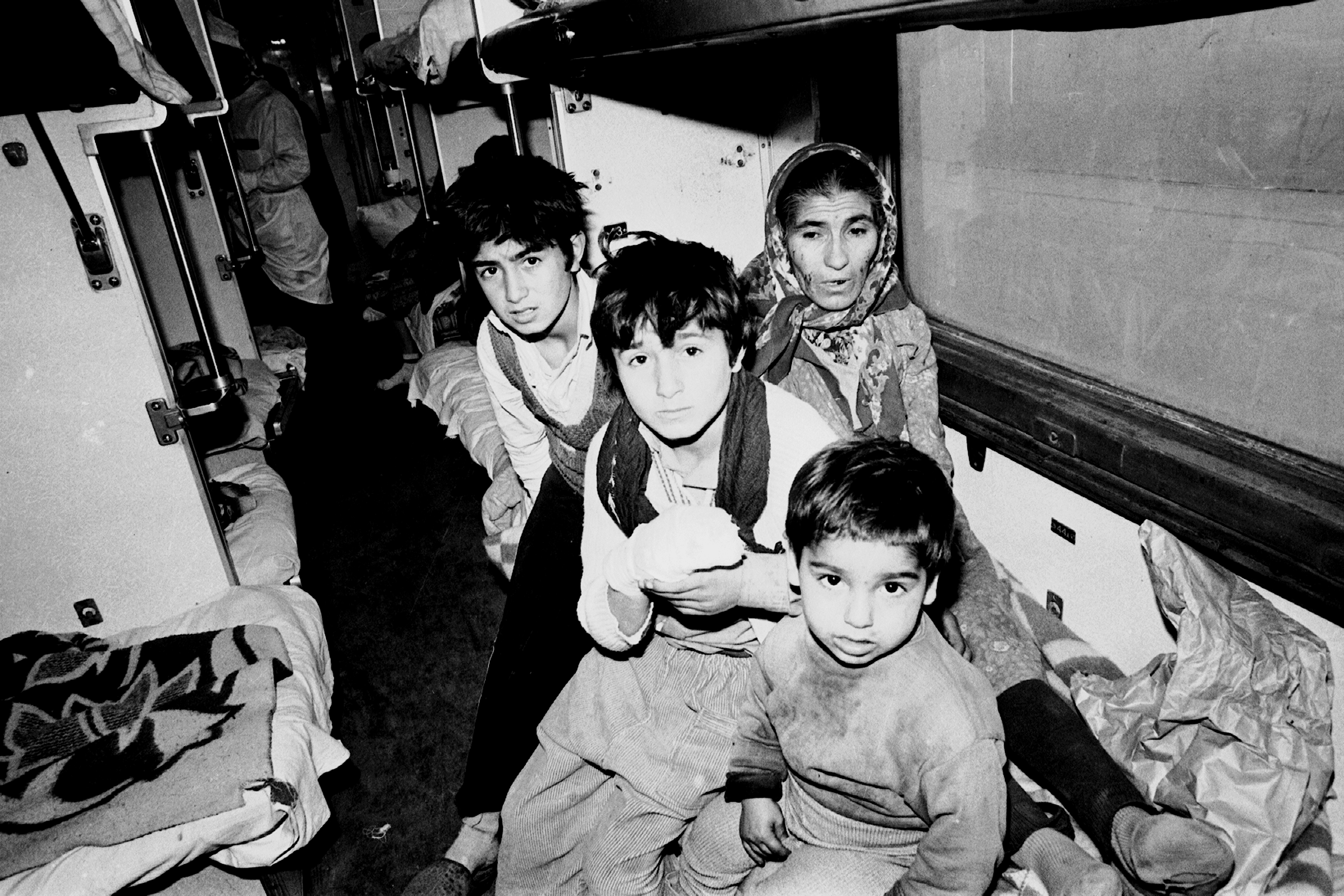
Azerbaijani refugees after the Khojaly massacre

Azerbaijanis who went missing during the First Nagorno-Karabakh War, refers to Azerbaijanis who either went missing, or were taken as POWs by the Armenian Armed Forces and Artsakh Defence Army, during the First Nagorno-Karabakh War, starting from 1988, and ending in 1994.

According to an investigation conducted by the Working Group of the State Commission of the Republic of Azerbaijan on Prisoners of War, Hostages and Missing Persons in 2007, the number of Azerbaijanis who went missing and were taken as POWs is 4,354. Of these, 3,503 were military personnel, and 841 were civilians, while the status of 9 of them was unknown. Of the civilians, 47 were children, with 16 of them being underage girls, 268 were women, and 371 were elderly people. Out of 4,354 missing Azerbaijanis, 783 of them were taken prisoner and taken hostage. According to the analysis of the materials received by the State Commission, 550 people were killed in captivity or died of various causes. Furthermore, 104 of them were women, while 446 were men. Only the names of 137 Azerbaijanis were identified, and the identity of 74 people is unknown.

== Statistics ==
As of 1 September 2005, the State Commission registered 4,740 Azerbaijani citizens as missing. By that time, the Armenians had freed a total of 1,378 people from captivity, and in relation to 1,203 people, inquiries were sent to the relevant state bodies and international organizations. They also studied the cases of 1,259 people included in the list of the State Commission who were not registered by the International Committee of the Red Cross as missing. After examining information about these people, information about them was sent to the ICRC.

According to the report of the Working Group of the State Commission of the Republic of Azerbaijan on Prisoners of War, Hostages and Missing Persons, on 25 December 2008, 4,210 people were registered as missing.

== State Commission ==
On 13 January 1993, the State Commission of the Republic of Azerbaijan on Prisoners of War, Hostages and Missing Persons was established by the decree of the Azerbaijani President Heydar Aliyev. The objectives of this commission were "taking measures for the social rehabilitation and restoring of the health of people released from captivity, taking measures to increase the effectiveness of the search of citizens and to ensure the implementation of cooperation with international organizations for this purpose, and carrying out consistent and purposeful work to deliver to the world community the legal and historical documents reflecting the policy of genocide and ethnic cleansing pursued by Armenia against Azerbaijanis, as well as materials related to captives, missing and hostages." Within the framework of the commission, its working group was also created.

According to Firudun Sadigov, head of the Working Group of the State Commission of the Republic of Azerbaijan on Prisoners of War, Hostages and Missing Persons, at the end of 2008, the fate of about 170 people was clarified and it became clear that they were alive. They were from Shusha, and its surrounding villages, Kalbajar, and Lachin. In general, from 2004 to 2008, the fate of about 800 people was determined. Some were dead, while their burial places were identified.

== See also ==
- List of people who disappeared
