= Artsrun Hovhannisyan =

Press secretary of Ministry of Defence of Armenia

- Արծրուն Հովհաննիսյան
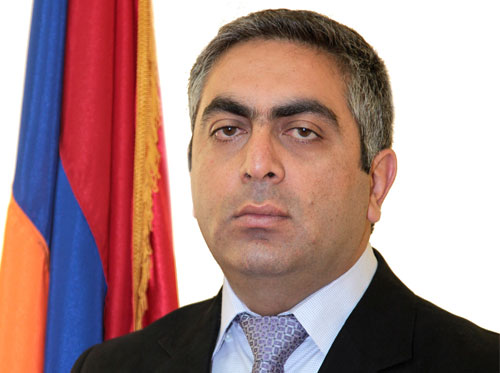

Head of the "National Defense Research University" of the Ministry of Defence of the Republic of Armenia («NDRU» MOD, RA SI)
- Incumbent
- Assumed office July 1, 2026

Press Secretary of Ministry of Defence of Armenia
- Incumbent
- Assumed office 2012–2020
- Minister: Seyran Ohanyan; Vigen Sargsyan; David Tonoyan

Personal details
- Born: January 30, 1980 (age 46) Tsoghamarg, Armenian Soviet Socialist Republic, Soviet Union
- Spouse: Mariam Hovhannisyan
- Children: 4
- Education: Vazgen Sargsyan Military University (Bachelor's degree); Armenian National Academy of Sciences (Master's degree and Candidate of History Sciences; Yerevan School of Political Studies

Military service
- Allegiance: Armenia
- Branch/service: Armed Forces of Armenia
- Years of service: 1997–present
- Rank: Colonel
- Unit: AAW, Artillery, Air force
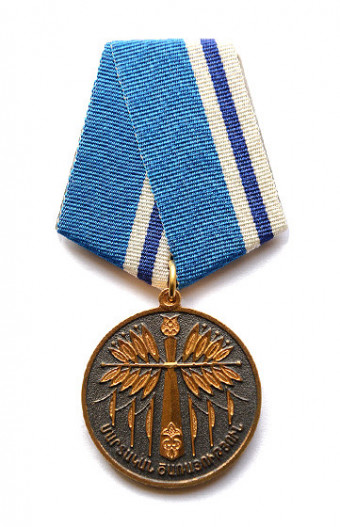
- Awards: , , ,

Artsrun Karapeti Hovhannisyan (Armenian: Արծրուն Կարապետի Հովհաննիսյան, born 30 January 1980 in Tsoghamarg) is the former press secretary of the Ministry of Defence of Armenia, a military expert and analyst. From March to July 2020 he held the position of Head of the Command and Staff Faculty at the Vazgen Sargsyan Military University, and from July of the same year - Head of the HR and Education Department. He is the author of numerous articles, monographs, works, reviews. From September 27 to November 9, 2020, during the Armenian-Azerbaijani war, he chaired the daily press conferences of the Armenian United Platform Center and presented the official position of the Republic of Armenia.

== Military activity ==
Since 1997, Hovhannisyan has served in the Armenian Armed Forces. After graduating from the university in 2001 and being promoted to a lieutenant, he was appointed as the platoon commander at one of the military bases of the Ministry of Defense.

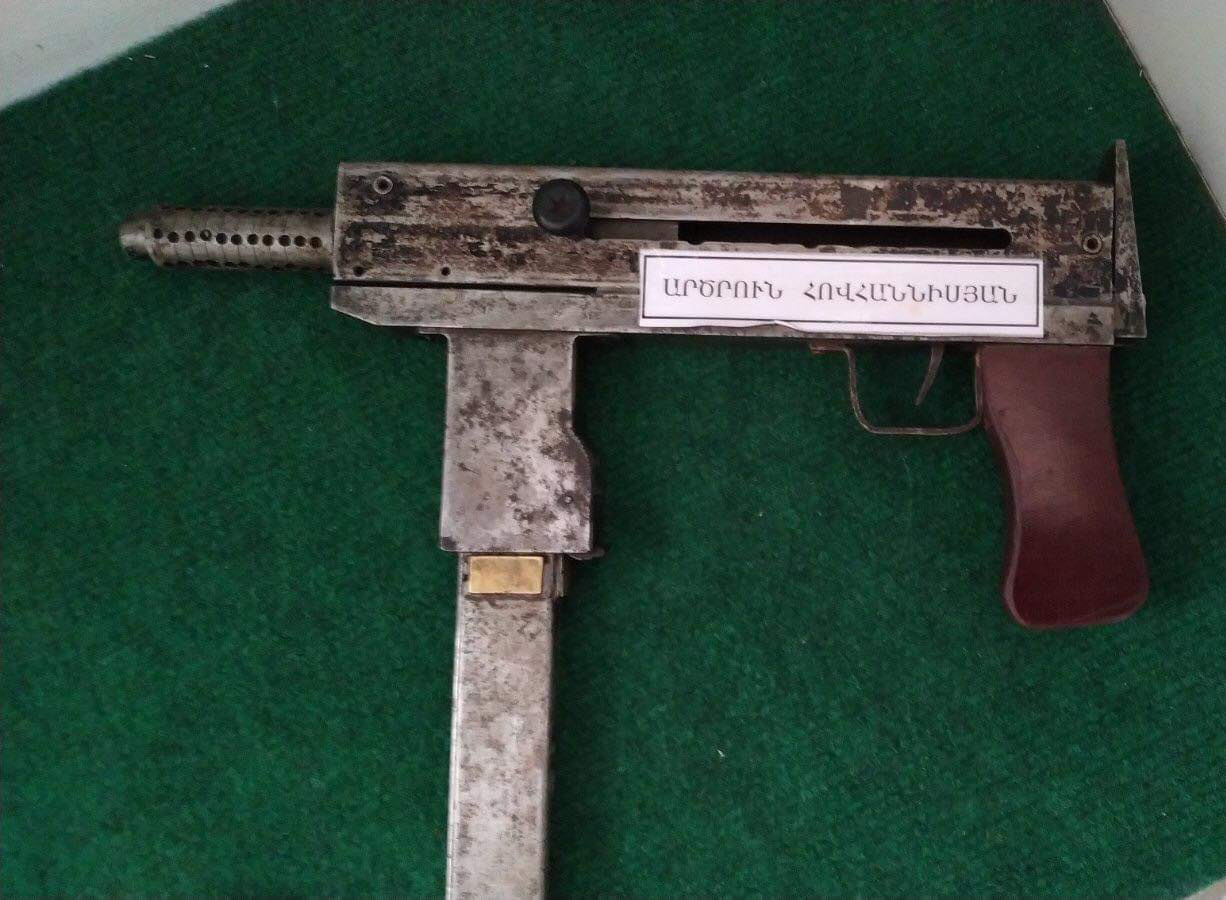
The machine gun developed by Artsrun Hovhannisyan.

In 2002 he was appointed commander of an anti-tank battery in the same military unit; in 2004, he was appointed as the guard commander of a battalion for an airport's technical support. From 2010 to 2011, he worked at the Institute of Political Research of Armenia's President's Staff as a military expert. In 2012, he worked at Public Relations Center of the President of Armenia. In 2012, Hovhannisyan became the press secretary of the Ministry of Defense of Armenia.

In March 2020, he was appointed as head of the Command and Staff Faculty of the Vazgen Sargsyan Military University. In July 2020, he was appointed as head of the HR and Education Department of the Ministry of Defense of the Republic of Armenia.

From 2010 to 2012 he studied at the International scientific-educational center of the National Academy of Sciences (NAS) with a major in history. In 2013 was an applicant of the Institute of History at NAS. In 2014, he received the title of a candidate of history.

While studying at the Military University, he developed a machine gun, which is currently housed in the University Museum.

In September 2023, he was appointed Head of the Marshal Hovhannes Baghramyan Command and Staff Institute (CSI) of the MoD Vazgen Sargsyan Military Academy.

In July 1, 2026, by the decree of the President of the Republic of Armenia, he was appointed Head of the "National Defense Research University" (NDRU) of the MoD of the Republic of Armenia.

== As a military scholar ==
In his works, Artsrun Hovhannisyan tries to reinterpret the wars and military operations of the twentieth century. He clearly emphasizes the importance of quality features, large scale task realizations with small forces, digital control, high-precision weapons, offensive tactics and other factors. According to him, the imperial and especially the USSR military doctrines should not be blindly used in the newly created armed forces of the Republic of Armenia, as they are intended for countries with practically unlimited resources, and do not correspond to the Armenian reality. As a theorist, several of his theses and theoretical substantiations are remarkable, in particular:

- Artsrun Hovhannisyan has his theoretical explanation of Generations of warfare. According to him, wars with automatic control systems are of Fifth-generation. According to Artsrun Hovhannisyan's theory, the generation of the war is based on deep economic, political, social and educational factors.․ According to him, the new industrial revolution has led to a new type of war with a new nature.
- Artsrun Hovhannisyan put forward the theory of networking-platform wars.
  Hovhannisyan Artsrun, Warfare. T2. Ground Breakthrough - Yer.: Author ed., 2020
- He raised the issue of operational arts crisis, the ideas of the electronic fire battle and operations.
- In his theory, he substantiated the six rules of air supremacy, his rules.։
- Artsrun Hovhannisyan has his own, unique justifications for irregular military operations and "hybrid wars". According to him, military science is now undergoing a transformation phase, which has brought up hybrid solutions.
- According to him, in the future, preference will be given to irregular military operations at the tactical level, the electronic devices of defeat as a means for defeat will prevail at the operational level, and the role of the air force will be primary at the general level. It was Artsrun Hovhannisyan who, in fact, was the first in Armenian reality to claim back in 2010 that Armenia needed a strong air force, specifically mentioning the need to acquire Sukhoi Su-30 fighters, as well as the capability of unmanned aerial vehicles:.
- Especially in his recent works, Artsrun Hovhannisyan tries to analyze the role of air supremacy, the need to unite the anti-aircraft warfare with air force, the theoretical and practical components of irregular military operations and the so-called "hybrid war" of the twentieth century, the issues of air supremacy and the features of use of small armies for military tactics.
- Artsrun Hovhannisyan wrote a critical article on the future of tank building, noting a clear direction in tank building, which implies small size, structural and armament modularity, without the need for personnel, etc. Three or four years after the article, Next Generation Combat Vehicle OMT, Type-X and other concepts with the mentioned features appear in the West.
- In his recent years’ works and articles Artsrun Hovhannisyan has separately discussed a number of current military issues, which were faced during the recent Artsakh war in particular.
  - the effectiveness of strikes on strategic objects,
  - problems of breaking the defensive lines,
  - the use of new tactical units, in particular battalion tactical groups,
  - the problem of time to replenish forces in modern wars, etc.

In electro-fire combat, electro-fire assets possess not only the distinct operational capabilities of all individual military branches, but also serve as the very foundation upon which these branches cooperate. This implies that all combat arms will continue to interact within electro-fire combat; the artillery, armor, and other components will still deliver fires, yet the electro-fire element will fundamentally predominate, while certain weapon systems will become integrated.

According to Hovhannisyan, sixth-generation multi-layered/complex warfare can manifest as a combination of operations conducted either independently or as a unified whole. Within these operations, activities across the physical and cyber-virtual domains will generate cognitive and behavioral outcomes, a concept widely recognized today as the cognitive dimension. Independent processes—at times involving the deployment of soft power, ideological and belief distortions, subtle military interventions, and large-scale combat operations currently termed "hybrid"—will become synchronized with conventional and regular warfare. The simultaneous execution of all these vectors inherently constitutes complex and multi-layered operations, the planning, implementation, and continuous command and control of which will demand immense effort and sophistication. While a war of rapid decisive collapse will remain the preferred approach, wars of attrition cannot be ruled out.

== Academic activities ==
Hovhannisyan has been a candidate at the Institute of History of the National Academy of Sciences of the Republic of Armenia since 2013, he has been teaching at YSU since the same year, and since January 2014 has been lecturing at the Command and Staff Faculty of the Vazgen Sargsyan Military University.

== Military publications ==
=== Works ===
- Regional military review․ Hovsepyan L. Hovhannisyan A. Minasyan S. Yerevan 2016, -203 p.
- Military Journalism. Educational-Methodological Handbook. A. Hovhannisyan. Yerevan 2018, -188 p.

=== Monographs ===
- "The most famous military aircraft" 2005, Yerevan
- "Aviation in Artsakh War" 2006, Yerevan
- "A few questions about aviation" 2009, Yerevan
- "Air superiority" 2010, Yerevan
- "Tsoghamarg". Yerevan 2010
- "Militarization of the region and the Armenian army" 2013, Yerevan
- The creation of army of the Thirds Republic of Armenia. IH NAS 2015. Yerevan
- Warfare. T1. Air Superiority - Yerevan.: Author ed., 2016(2021). -. 792(824) + 36 p.
- The development of military art in 20th century and perspectives. Brief research - Yer.: Institute of history, NSA RA, 2017, - 661 p.
- "The "Symphony" of Attack, or the Rise of a Crushing War in the Military Art". Yerevan: RA MoD 2019. - 122 p.
- Warfare. T2. Ground Breakthrough - Yerevan.: Author ed., 2020. -1336+24 p.
- The Main Determinant of Network-Platform-Centric Warfare. Los Angeles. 2021.-167 p.
- Fundamentals of the Theory of Military Art at the Beginning of the 20th Century: Regularities of Military Science and Operational Art in 1900–1945․ Yerevan 2024. 252p․
- The Complex/Multilayered Warfare: Summary of Sixth-Generation Warfare․ Yerevan 2025. 216p.

=== Articles ===
1. About strategic plans of modernization of Turkey's anti-air defense and anti-ballistic missiles defense/L. S. Hovsepyan, A. K. Hovhannisyan /Armenian Army 2010
2. Perspectives of application of unmanned aerial vehicles in our region
3. Should the military air forces and anti-air defence armies be unified? "The 21-st century",# 2, 2010
4. Air cargo transport in Armenia
5. Analysis of actions by Azerbaidjani aviation forces and Armenian anti-air defence in Artsakh war, "The 21-st century",# 4, 2010
6. The militarization of Azerbaijan "The 21-st century",# 3, 2011, pg. 46-60
7. Iran's military potential in case of a war, "Modern Eurasia" (2012)
8. Comparative analysis of military indicators of ROA, NK and Azeri republic. Working notebooks, addendum 1-2, (21-22) 2012 (Secret)
9. The armor of ROA's Armed Forces, Armenian historical questions, 13.2012
10. The new problems of militarization in Asia and the American new militarization, "Modern Eurasia" II (2), 2013, pg.81 - 98
11. Some aspects of the art of war during the Artsakh war 1993-1994, "The 21-st century" 1/2014, pg.33-59
12. A. Ogannisyan, L. Ovsepyan. Turkish Army. Between Stereotypes and reality. 21st CENTURY. 4/2014, I erased 31-47.
13. Certain issues of application of historical-comparative methodology/Armenian Army 3-4,2014, pg.226-234
14. Information attacks by an example of the Ministry of Defence. Conflict communications and information security. Materials of conference of 2015, p. 73-82.
15. The lessons learnt from the latest wars of 20th century. «21st century», # 4, 2015, p. 104-116։
16. Influence of Aerial Combat on the Development of Armoured Fighting Vehicles. Jul-Sep 2015, Vol. 30 (3) Indian defence review. p 110-114.
17. Hybrid Warfare: Traditions and innovations // Paths to peace and security 2016. № 1(50). P. 111-119.
18. Current Phase of Development of Armenian Armed Forces, HISTORY AND CULTURE, Journal of Armenian Studies, Yerevan, YSU, pp 99–112
19. Certain issues of hybrid warfare determination and classification: Armenian Army 2 (88) 2016. P. 62-72:
20. About Wars of the Future; Jul-Sep 2016. Vol. 31.3 Indian defence review, Issue. p. 69-79.
21. Strategic analysis of April War. Certain considerations in the "Nation-Army" system of the RA defense system improvement. Armenian Army 1-2 (91-92) 2017. P. 34-47:
22. Assurance of victory by air superiority during irregular military operations in the example of Iraq (2003) and Syrian (2015–2017) warfare. Armenian Army 4 (94). 2017, P. 88-96:
23. On the issue of the blow effectiveness of strategic objects caused by air attack resources. Armenian Army. 1-2 (95-96). 2018, P. 185-203:
24. The role and application of pilot-less flying objects in modern warfare. The strategy 1(I) 2018, P. 49-69:
25. The Role of Information Activities in Modern Warfare. Military journalism. Educational-methodical manual 2018, P. 50-78:
26. Azerbaijani Armed Forces. Assessment of military power. Military journalism. Educational-methodical manual 2018, P 100-131:
27. Issues of Flexible and Static Defense in next generation warfare. Observation of the vision of RA Ministry of Defense. Armenian Army 4 (98). 2018, P. 55-75:
28. A. Hovhannisyan, A. Grigoryan. The advantages of using battalion tactical groups in our region. Armenian Army 4 (98). 2018, Էջ 86-94:
29. Asia-Pacific theater in focus: Comparison of weapons systems of near-peer competitors, current issues. CONTEMPORARY EURASI. Vll(1,2) 2018 p. 4-21.
30. Military art in the Artsakh War. Artsakh in the crossroads of the struggle for the Armenian statehood. International conference. 2018, P 203-211:
31. The Temporary Issues of reinforcement in Modern Warfare. Armenian Army 1 (99). 2019, P. 17-26:
32. The Six rules of breaking air defense tested in the Middle East. The Countries and peoples of the near and Middle East. volume XXXII, part 2. Yerevan. 2019. p. 325-334.
33. Historical Notes on the Armenian-British Military Collaboration. 1918-1920, REVIEW OF ARMENIAN STUDIES. 2019 N 3 (21). p. 17-31.
34. The manifestation of concepts of UAV swarms and clusters in the Middle East. The Countries and peoples of the near and Middle East. volume XXXIII, part 1. Yerevan. 2020. p. 425-455.
35. Generation of warfare and the future of hybrid wars. BULLETIN. Of the institute of oriental studies. Volume I(34), p 102-119.
36. The Introduction of NET-PLATFORM-CENTRIC warfare in the Chinese Army (PLA), BULLETIN. Of the institute of oriental studies. Volume I, II 2021, p 185-200.
37. TROOPS MANAGEMENT SYSTEMS AND THE DIFFERENCE OF CULTURES pp. 22–39. FUNDAMENTAL ARMENOLOGY № № 2 (18) 2023.
38. TROOPS MANAGEMENT SYSTEMS AND THE DIFFERENCE OF CULTURES. Part II pp․44-58. (Variants and Lessons of Russian, Soviet and Other Models for Us)/ Artsrun Hovhannisyan, Vachagan Davoyan․ FUNDAMENTAL ARMENOLOGY 1 (19) 2024․

=== Reviews ===
1. Armen Harutyunyan, Artsrun Hovhannisyan, "The aviation in Artsakh war", "Aviamania", Scientific company, 2006
2. "A few questions about aviation" book, Noravanq foundation
3. M.T.Hakobyan, Artsrun Hovhannisyan, "Militarization of the region and the Armenian army", Journal of Social Sciences 1/2014, pg.304-306

== Awards ==
Artsrun Hovhannisyan was awarded with a number of awards, including the "Combat Service" of the Republic of Armenia, "Vazgen Sargsyan", "Nelson Stepanyan", "For Impeccable Service" medals of the Armed Forces of the Republic of Armenia.

== Other projects ==
In 2008 Artsrun Hovhannisyan participated as a consultant in the works of the documentary "Nelson Stepanyan" authored by A. Margaryan. In 2010, as an author, Artsrun Hovhannisyan shot the documentary "In the hallways of the sky" within the framework of the "Armed Forces" program.
