= Seysulan =

Seysulan Սեյսուլան
- Location within Azerbaijan
- Coordinates: 40°14′47″N 46°59′06″E
- Country: Azerbaijan
  - District: Aghdara
- Time zone: UTC+4 (AZT)

Seysulan (Armenian: Սեյսուլան) is a village in the Aghdara District of Azerbaijan, in the region of Nagorno-Karabakh. The village was on the ceasefire line between the armed forces of Artsakh and Azerbaijan prior to the Azerbaijani offensive in September 2023. The village had an ethnic Armenian-majority population in 1989.

== History ==
Seysulan was located in the Mardakert District of the Nagorno-Karabakh Autonomous Oblast (Azerbaijan SSR) during the Soviet period. In 1991 the Azerbaijani government dissolved the NKAO and placed Seysulan in the Tartar District. The village came under the control of ethnic Armenian forces during the First Nagorno-Karabakh War in the early 1990s.

Azerbaijan claimed to have attacked and retaken the village during clashes on 2 April 2016, but the Artsakh Defence Army disputeded this claim as disinformation.
