= Tsoghamarg =

Village in Shirak, Armenia

Tsoghamarg Ցողամարգ
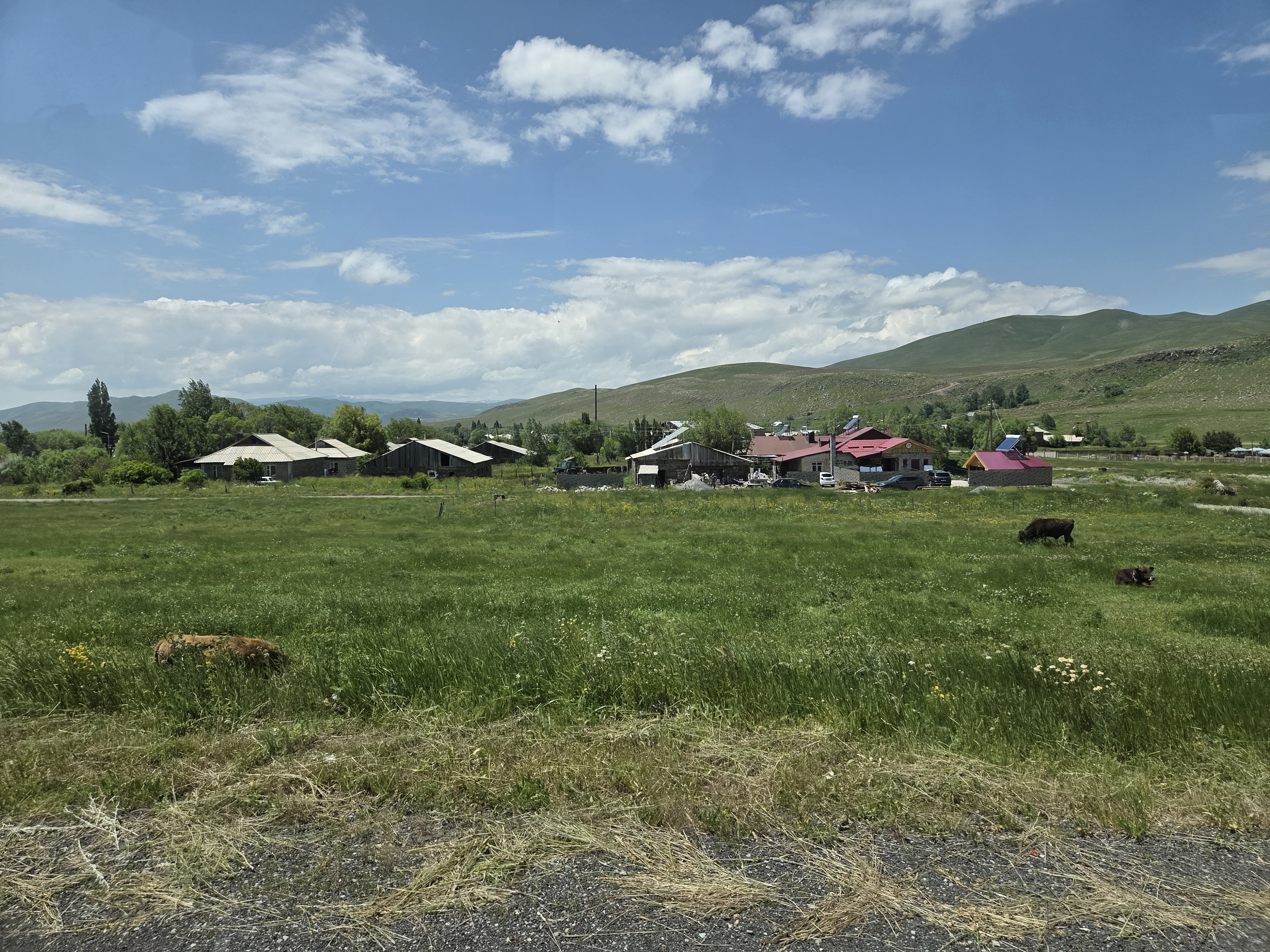

- Location within Armenia Location within Shirak
- Coordinates: 40°56′53″N 43°51′22″E
- Country: Armenia
- Province: Shirak
- Municipality: Ashotsk

Population (2011)
  - Total: 495
- Time zone: UTC+4
  - Summer (DST): UTC+5

Tsoghamarg (Armenian: Ցողամարգ) is a village in the Ashotsk Municipality of the Shirak Province of Armenia. It was founded by migrants from Sebastea.

== Demographics ==
Historical population
Year	Pop.	±% p.a.
1831	174	—
1897	877	+2.48%
1926	515	−1.82%
1939	807	+3.52%
1959	591	−1.55%
1970	541	−0.80%
1979	477	−1.39%
1989	600	+2.32%
2001	543	−0.83%
2011	495	−0.92%
