= Zaur Shiriyev =

Azerbaijani academic

- Zaur Şiriyev
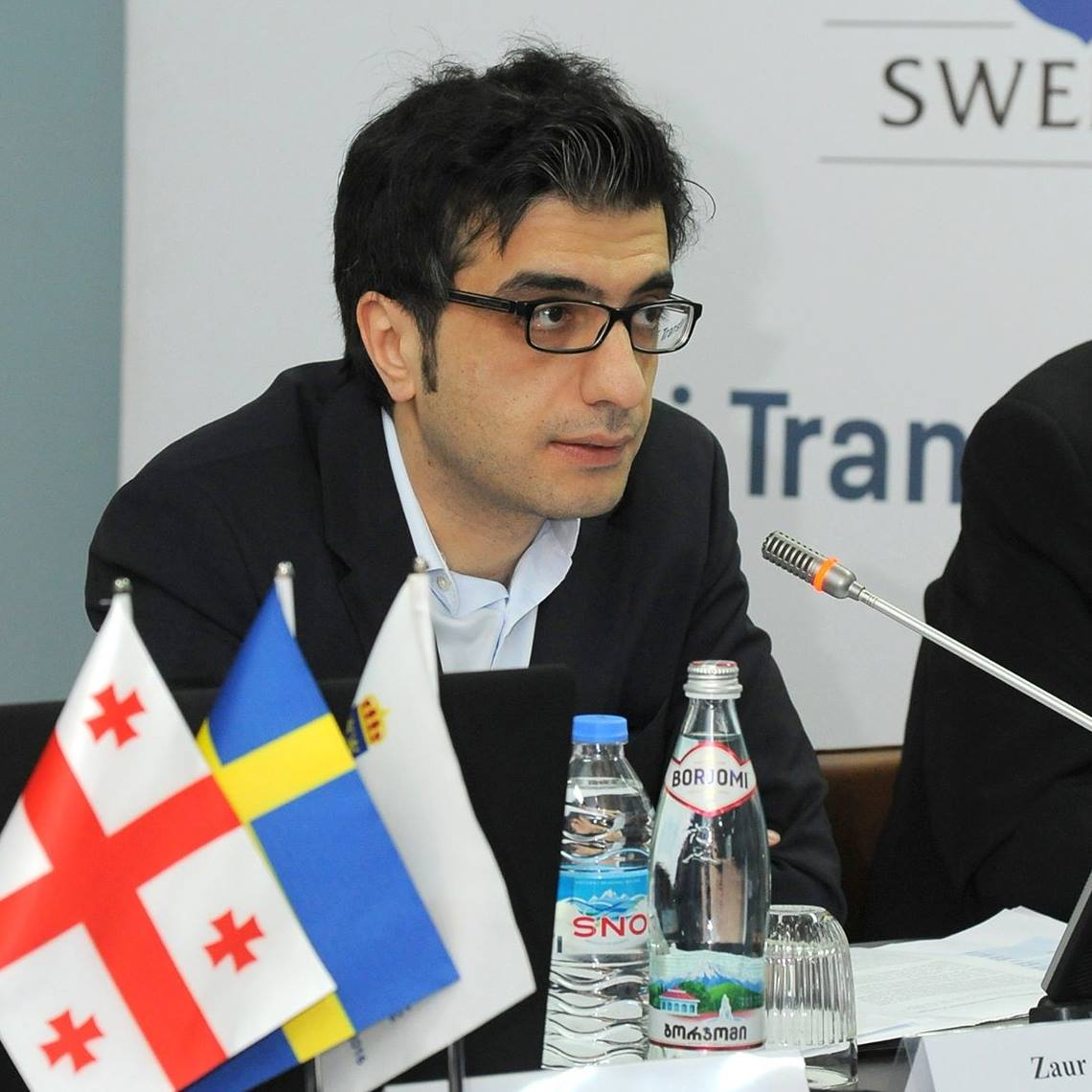
- Born: Sheki, Azerbaijan
- Occupation: Academy Associate
- Organization: Chatham House

Zaur Shiriyev is an Azerbaijani academic in the field of international affairs. He is an Academy Associate at the Royal Institute of International Affairs (Chatham House) in London. He was a senior research fellow at ADA University, Baku, where he worked between May 2014 and March 2017. Prior to joining ADA University, he worked as leading research fellow at the Center for Strategic Studies under the President of the Republic of Azerbaijan (2009–14). He founded and has served as Editor-in-Chief of the first English-language academic journal in Azerbaijan, “Caucasus International”, in 2011. Caucasus International was the first English-language foreign policy journal to which academics from all three of the South Caucasus countries contributed. It is rare if not unique for a dispassionate academic journal to be created by and for the main parties to one of the world’s “frozen conflict zones,” which is what the Caucasus certainly is.

Prior to this position, from 2004 to 2008 he worked in Turkey as a researcher at the Caucasus-Middle East Study Department of the Turkish Asian Center for Strategic Studies (TASAM) in Istanbul, and as a senior researcher for the Caucasus-Central Asia Department at the International Strategic Research Organization (ISRO) in Ankara.

Shiriyev became a columnist for Today's Zaman newspaper in Turkey and has participated in and spoken at several conferences on regional issues, conflict resolution and European Union policy. He was awarded the “Black Sea Young Reformers Fellowship” in 2011, and was elected by the Atlantic Forum as a young leader from Azerbaijan for the XII European Young Leaders Conference in 2012.

He is currently a contributing analyst for the Jamestown Foundation's Eurasia Daily Monitor and Central Asia-Caucasus Institute & Silk Road Studies Program's Central Asia-Caucasus Analyst in Washington DC. His areas of expertise include security issues and conflict resolution in the post-Soviet space, Turkish foreign policy, and the foreign and national security policies of the South Caucasus states, with an emphasis on the domestic determinants of such policies. Zaur Shiriyev has published numerous articles and commentaries and co-edited The Geopolitical Scene of the Caucasus: A Decade of Perspectives (Istanbul; 2013) and Azerbaijan and the New Energy Geopolitics of Southeast Europe (Washington, DC; 2015).
