= State Commission on Prisoners of War, Hostages and Missing Persons =

Government commission

The Azerbaijan's State Commission for Prisoners of War, Hostages and Missing Persons has been established in order to release hostages and prisoners of war as a result of the First Nagorno-Karabakh War. It increases the effectiveness of search for captured and missing persons in conflict zones, and coordinates the activities of public bodies and international organizations for attracting attention to this issue.

== Activities ==
- Accumulate data about prisoners of war, hostages and missing persons (the distressed) who are citizens of the Republic of Azerbaijan;
- Establish a systematic database of the collected information;
- Protect citizens' rights who are in captivity due to the Nagorno Karabakh conflict;
- Discuss and hold meetings (as necessary) on the issue regarding the distressed on a regular basis;
- Investigate any observed any rules break mentioned in the provisions of the Geneva Conventions;
- Act with International Committee of the Red Cross and related international organizations that deal with the distressed;
- Ensure that people released from captivity have ability to realize their needs;
- Ensure that letters, applications and appeals relating to the distressed are reviewed;
- Register opponents captured within the Republic of Azerbaijan. assemble them in processing centers and observe the implementation of the requirements of the Geneva Conventions;

The Commission intends to implement its activities transparently, and regularly inform the public about the measures taken related to the distressed.

== International relations ==
The Commission collaborates with ICRC, Talat Pasa Committee, the relevant entity in Croatia and other international organizations or persons that operate in this field. ICRC-organized training courses were held in the Republic of Cyprus on 24–28 January 2016, on the search for missing persons as a result of armed conflicts, and finding, identifying and returning the dead. On 19 May 2016 Commission member Bahar Muradova met Elena Ajmone Sessera the head of the (ICRC) Delegation in Baku to further cooperation.
