= List of Azerbaijani generals =

This is a list of notable Azerbaijani generals and admirals, which is arranged alphabetically.

Note that these generals and admirals were under the allegiance of separate successive armies under different states, and some served in more than one. These states in succession include the Russian Empire, the Azerbaijan Democratic Republic, the Soviet Union and the current Republic of Azerbaijan.

== A ==
- Safar Abiyev — Colonel General of the Azerbaijani Armed Forces of the Republic of Azerbaijan and Chief of General Staff of Azerbaijani Armed Forces of the Republic of Azerbaijan, and recipient of the Shohrat Order
- Sadykh bey Aghabekov — Major General of the Imperial Russian Army
- Tahir Aliyev — Major General of the Azerbaijani Armed Forces of the Republic of Azerbaijan
- Rufat Amirov — Colonel General and acting Chief of General Staff of Azerbaijani Armed Forces of the Republic of Azerbaijan
- Mahammad Asadov — Major General of the Azerbaijani Armed Forces of the Republic of Azerbaijan
- Rafig Asgarov — Counter Admiral and Commander of the Azerbaijani Naval Forces of the Republic of Azerbaijan
- Hazi Aslanov — Major General of the Soviet Army, and twice recipient of the Hero of the Soviet Union award

== B ==
- Valeh Barshadly — Lieutenant General of the Soviet Army and the Azerbaijani Armed Forces and Chief of General Staff of Azerbaijani Armed Forces of the Republic of Azerbaijan
- Beshir Imanov — Major General of the Soviet Union
- Mais Barkhudarov — Azerbaijani officer, major general of Armed Forces of Azerbaijan

== G ==
- Abdulhamid bey Gaytabashi — Major General of the Azerbaijani Armed Forces of the Azerbaijan Democratic Republic and Chief of General Staff of Azerbaijani Armed Forces of the Azerbaijan Democratic Republic

== H ==
- Zakir Hasanov — Colonel General of the Azerbaijani Armed Forces and Minister of Defense of Azerbaijan
- Hikmat Hasanov — an Azerbaijani Major General, who is the Commander of the 1st Army Corps
- Polad Hashimov — Azerbaijani army officer and major general

== K ==
- Kerim Kerimov — Lieutenant General of the Soviet Army
- Rustam Khan Khoyski — Lieutenant General of the Imperial Russian Army
- Ismayil bek Kutkashensky — Major General of the Imperial Russian Army and first Azerbaijani ever to be decorated with Order of St. George

== M ==
- Eldar Mahmudov — Lieutenant General of the Azerbaijani Armed Forces of the Republic of Azerbaijan, and recipient of the Azerbaijani Flag Order
- Mammadrafi Mammadov — Lieutenant General of the Soviet Army and the Azerbaijani Armed Forces of the Republic of Azerbaijan
- Tajaddin Mehdiyev — Major General of the Azerbaijani Armed Forces of the Republic of Azerbaijan
- Samad bey Mehmandarov — General of the Artillery of the Imperial Russian Army
- Shahin Musayev — Colonel General of the Azerbaijani Armed Forces of the Republic of Azerbaijan and Chief of General Staff of Azerbaijani Armed Forces of the Republic of Azerbaijan
- Vahid Musayev — Major General of the Azerbaijani Armed Forces of the Republic of Azerbaijan
- Hikmat Mirzayev — an Azerbaijani military officer, lieutenant general of the Azerbaijani Armed Forces, Commander of the Special Forces

== N ==
- Jamshid Nakhchivanski — Lieutenant General of the Azerbaijani Armed Forces of the Azerbaijan Democratic Republic and Combrig (equivalent to Brigadier General) of the Soviet Army

== R ==
- Dadash Rzayev — Major General of the Azerbaijani Armed Forces of the Republic of Azerbaijan, and recipient of the Azerbaijani Flag Order

== S ==
- Najmaddin Sadigov — Colonel General and Chief of General Staff of Azerbaijani Armed Forces of the Republic of Azerbaijan
- Nuraddin Sadigov — Major General and Chief of General Staff of Azerbaijani Armed Forces of the Republic of Azerbaijan
- Habib Bey Salimov — Major General of the Imperial Russian Army and the Azerbaijani Armed Forces of the Azerbaijan Democratic Republic, and Chief of General Staff of Azerbaijani Armed Forces of the Azerbaijan Democratic Republic
- Ali-Agha Shikhlinski — Lieutenant General of the Russian Imperial Army and General of the Artillery of the Azerbaijan Democratic Republic
- Mammad Bey Shulkevich — Lieutenant General of the Imperial Russian Army and the Azerbaijani Armed Forces of the Azerbaijan Democratic Republic, and Chief of General Staff of Azerbaijani Armed Forces of the Azerbaijan Democratic Republic
- Khosrov bey Sultanov — Major General of the Imperial Russian Army
- Shahin Sultanov — Vice Admiral and Commander of the Azerbaijani Naval Forces of the Republic of Azerbaijan, and recipient of the Azerbaijani Flag Order

== U ==
- Ibrahim bey Usubov — Major General of the Imperial Russian Army and the Azerbaijani Armed Forces of the Azerbaijan Democratic Republic
- Ramil Usubov — Colonel General of the Ministry of Internal Affairs (Azerbaijani). Recipient of the Azerbaijani Flag Order
