= Sarov (disambiguation) =

Sarov is a town in Nizhny Novgorod Oblast, Russia. It may also refer to

Places

- Sarov Monastery in Sarov, Russia
- Sarov, Goranboy, a village and municipality in the Goranboy Rayon of Azerbaijan
- Sarov, Tartar, a village and municipality in the Tartar Rayon of Azerbaijan
- Sarovlu, a village in the Goranboy Rayon of Azerbaijan

Other

- HC Sarov, an ice hockey team in Sarov, Russia
- Sarov-class submarine
- Seraphim of Sarov (1754–1833), Russian monk
