= Sarov, Azerbaijan =

Sarov, Azerbaijan may refer to:

- Sarov, Goranboy
- Sarov, Tartar
- Sarovlu
