= Dadash Rzayev =

Azerbaijani politician (1935–2024)

- (Dadaş Rzayev)

Minister of Defense
- In office 21 February 1993 – 17 June 1993
- President: Abulfaz Elchibey
- Preceded by: Rahim Gaziyev
- Succeeded by: Safar Abiyev (acting)

Personal details
- Born: 22 December 1935 Delimammadli, Goranboy District, Azerbaijan SSR, USSR
- Died: 27 May 2024 (aged 88)

Military service
- Branch/service: Azerbaijani Armed Forces
- Years of service: 1959–1995
- Rank: Major General
- Battles/wars: Battle for Bashkend, Askeran

Dadash Garib oghlu Rzayev (22 December 1935 – 27 May 2024) was an Azerbaijani major general and politician who was Minister of Defense of Azerbaijan from February to June 1993, and was the Chairman of Confederation of Azerbaijani Officers in Reserve. His active service in the army lasted for 40 years, 37 of which were in the Airborne Troops.

== Early life ==
Rzayev was born in 1935 in Delimammadli city of Goranboy District, Azerbaijan. He never planned a military career but always wanted to be a pilot. In 1953, he was enrolled at Azerbaijan Technical University. A year later his studies were interrupted and he was conscripted to military service at Soviet Airborne Troops stationed in Belarus for a period of three years. After military quarantine, he was directed to confidential state Officers School in isolated location in Kazakhstan for a period of one year. After completion of his course, he returned to the military service. Six months before completion of his service, he was sent to continue his military education at School of Airborne Troops. He graduated from the school in 1959. While a cadet he has been awarded the Order of the Red Star for excellence in his studies.

== Active military duty ==
=== Soviet Army ===
Rzayev started his military career when he held the rank of Lieutenant. After graduating from military school, he was first sent to the 106th Guards Airborne Division at Tula, Russian SFSR. He was then promoted to captain. Unlike other officers, he ran a 40 kilometres (25 mi) distance to shooting range in front of his tabor of soldiers and always did exercises prior to his soldiers during the trainings for encouragement purposes. Soldiers of his tabor always received higher grades when commander of the army checked the statistics. After completion of Frunze Military Academy, he served as Commander of airborne regiments in Kaunas, Lithuania and then in Baku, Azerbaijan. After that, he was appointed First Deputy to Commander of 12,000 men division. Rzayev was then assigned to troops in Lviv, Ukraine where he established airborne brigade. During this time he was promoted to the rank of colonel. During the Ogaden War, Soviets provided assistance to Ethiopian government and Rzayev was sent to Ethiopia as an "agricultural expert". He created an airborne brigade for the Ethiopian Ministry of Defense and led some combat operations. He is said to have played a significant role in formation of Ethiopian troops. During the Soviet–Afghan War, he supervised 4 tabors.

=== Azerbaijani Armed Forces ===
Rzayev came back to Azerbaijan and started working at Karabakh Public Relief Committee which supplied him with a helicopter. He visited villages in Karabakh and transported food to isolated areas. He received his rank of a General in 1991. At the end of 1991, the new Defense Minister Valeh Barshadly appointed Rzayev his deputy. On 25 September 1991, President Ayaz Mutalibov appointed him Commander of National Self-Defense Forces. Rzayev was the author of the military oath of allegiance which was taken by him and the first unit of the independent Azerbaijani Army known as The First tabor based on unit 18110 of the Soviet Army, on 8 December 1991 in the Martyrs' Alley. Once Barshadly became the Chief of General Staff of Azerbaijani Armed Forces, he ordered him to create northwestern military corpus. Rzayev took the assignment and created a 12,000 men corpus in the Tovuz region. During the Karabakh conflict, he personally led the operation which captured the village of Bashkend. On 21 February 1993, he was appointed Minister of Defense by President Abulfaz Elchibey. On 17 June he was sacked by Elchibey and on 16 July 1993 he was accused in the report of the investigative commission of the parliament of being a part to skirmishes during the Ganja revolt of June 1993 and was removed from the position of Minister of Defense. He retired from active service in the army in 1995. and remained in the ministry working at Military Scientific Center of the Ministry of Defense. However, 30 generals, colonels and high-ranking officers, including Rzayev were laid off in 2009 due to ongoing reforms in the ministry.

== Later years ==
=== Confederation of Officers in Reserve ===
Rzayev was the Chairman of Confederation of Azerbaijani Officers in Reserve. The organization has branches in 65 regions of Azerbaijan. As the chairman, Rzayev has been an outspoken proponent of appointment of military training course teachers in secondary schools by the Ministry of Defense, not Ministry of Education so as to improve the quality of knowledge of youth before they are conscripted for active duty. He was also a proponent of aligning the Azerbaijani army according to NATO standards. Rzayev was confident that existing Azerbaijani manufacturing plants have a capacity to start producing the T-72 tanks to foster the domestic military production in Azerbaijan.

=== Guinness world records ===
In 2009, Rzayev made headlines after parachuting from an airplane at the age of 74. This was his 1506th time on parachute. He first did it on 16 January 1955 as a cadet. Rzayev took off on an airplane from the Balakan base of Technical Sports Organization of Azerbaijani Military Volunteers and jumped when the plane reached the altitude of 1,000–1,200 meters. He was the oldest person at 74 to jump off with a parachute on the territory of post Soviet states and the third person in the world to do it at that age.

=== Death ===
Rzayev died on 27 May 2024, at the age of 88. He was buried in the Second Martyrs' Lane in Baku.

== See also ==
- Azerbaijani Army
- Ministers of Defense of Azerbaijan Republic
- Safar Abiyev
