= Shahin Musayev =

Shahin Musayev Şahin Musayev

Acting Minister of Defense of Azerbaijan
- In office 17 February 1992 – 24 February 1992
- President: Ayaz Mutalibov
- Preceded by: Tajeddin Mehdiyev
- Succeeded by: Tahir Aliyev (acting)

Chief of General Staff of Azerbaijani Armed Forces
- In office September 1991 (officially from 22 January 1992) – May 1992
- Preceded by: office re-established
- Succeeded by: Colonel Rufat Amirov (acting)

Military service
- Branch/service: Azerbaijani Armed Forces
- Rank: Colonel General

Shahin Musayev Kheyreddin oglu (Azerbaijani: Şahin Musayev Xeyrəddin oğlu) was the deputy Minister of Defense of Azerbaijan, Chief of Staff, and Acting Minister within a few weeks in January – February (unspecified), 1992.

== Acting Minister of Defense of Azerbaijan ==
In late January – February 1992, Musayev serving as Deputy Minister of Defense of Azerbaijan, virtually assumed responsibilities of then the Minister of Defense, Tajeddin Mehdiyev who was in Nagorno-Karabakh most of the time, personally leading an unsuccessful Dashalty operation in the vicinity of Shusha and losing several villages of strategic importance, Karkijahan, Gushchular, Malibeyli and Garadaghly, within a few weeks. On 17 February 1992, with the fall of Garadaghly village of Khojavend Rayon where more than 70 Azerbaijani civilians died and shortly before the fall of Khojaly, Mehdiyev was officially removed from the post of Minister of Defense. The interim leadership of ministry was given to Chief of Staff, Shahin Musayev. He would then be replaced by the commander of forces in Aghdam Tahir Aliyev, in late February, 1992.

== Chief of Staff ==
Colonel Musayev was Chief of General Staff of Azerbaijani Armed Forces from September 1991 (officially from 22 January). While a Chief of Staff, Musayev was also repeatedly accused of state treason. On 7 May 1992 he called commandant of Shusha, Elbrus Orujov and told him to clear the land mines in all entrances to Shusha and pull all the ammunition and military equipment back from the first positions allegedly because of visiting members of Red Cross and the Organization for Security and Co-operation in Europe. This facilitated advance of Armenian forces into the town the next day and Shusha fell on 8 May. While in Gubadly in mid of 1992, Musayev ordered the Azerbaijani population of Gubadly rayon to the leave town. He allegedly told the people in Gubadly that the surface-to-surface missiles were brought to Azerbaijan and that Shusha occupied in May 1992, would be shelled with these missiles and some could accidentally hit Gubadly. Colonel Nusrat Namazov, stationed in Gubadly refuted these claims and argued that then these missiles could instead be installed on heights around Gubadly and shot in the direction of Shusha and if they missed, they would hit Armenian positions in Khankendi located right next to Shusha. This was perceived as an act of treason in favor of Armenians and Musayev was apprehended by the locals but was released at Minister Rahim Gaziyev's insistence. He would later flee to Russia.

== General's plot ==
Shahin Musayev was one of the masterminds of the so-called General's Plot to overthrow the government of President Heydar Aliyev. Musayev along with the other former Deputy Minister of Defense, Vahid Musayev and Faig Bakhishaliyev (Special Purpose Police Unit) were arrested and imprisoned in August 1995 on charges of organizing coup d'état by planning to shoot the presidential airplane down in a premeditated rocket attack in May 1995.

== See also ==
- Azerbaijani Army
- Ministers of Defense of Azerbaijan Republic
