= Military history of Azerbaijan =

The military history of Azerbaijan is framed within thousands of years of armed actions of many other states in the territory encompassing modern Azerbaijan, as well as the shorter history of interventions by the Azerbaijani Armed Forces in conflicts abroad. The Azerbaijanis are the inheritors of the lands of various ancient civilizations and peoples including the indigenous Caucasian Albanians, Iranian tribes such as Scythians and Alans, and Oghuz Turks among others (note that several modern peoples of the Caucasus can trace their ancestries to more than one of these same ancient peoples).

Azerbaijan's location on the crossroads of Asia and Europe made it possible for Azerbaijanis to have military contact with both the Asian and European military powers.

== Antiquity ==
=== Caucasian Albania ===
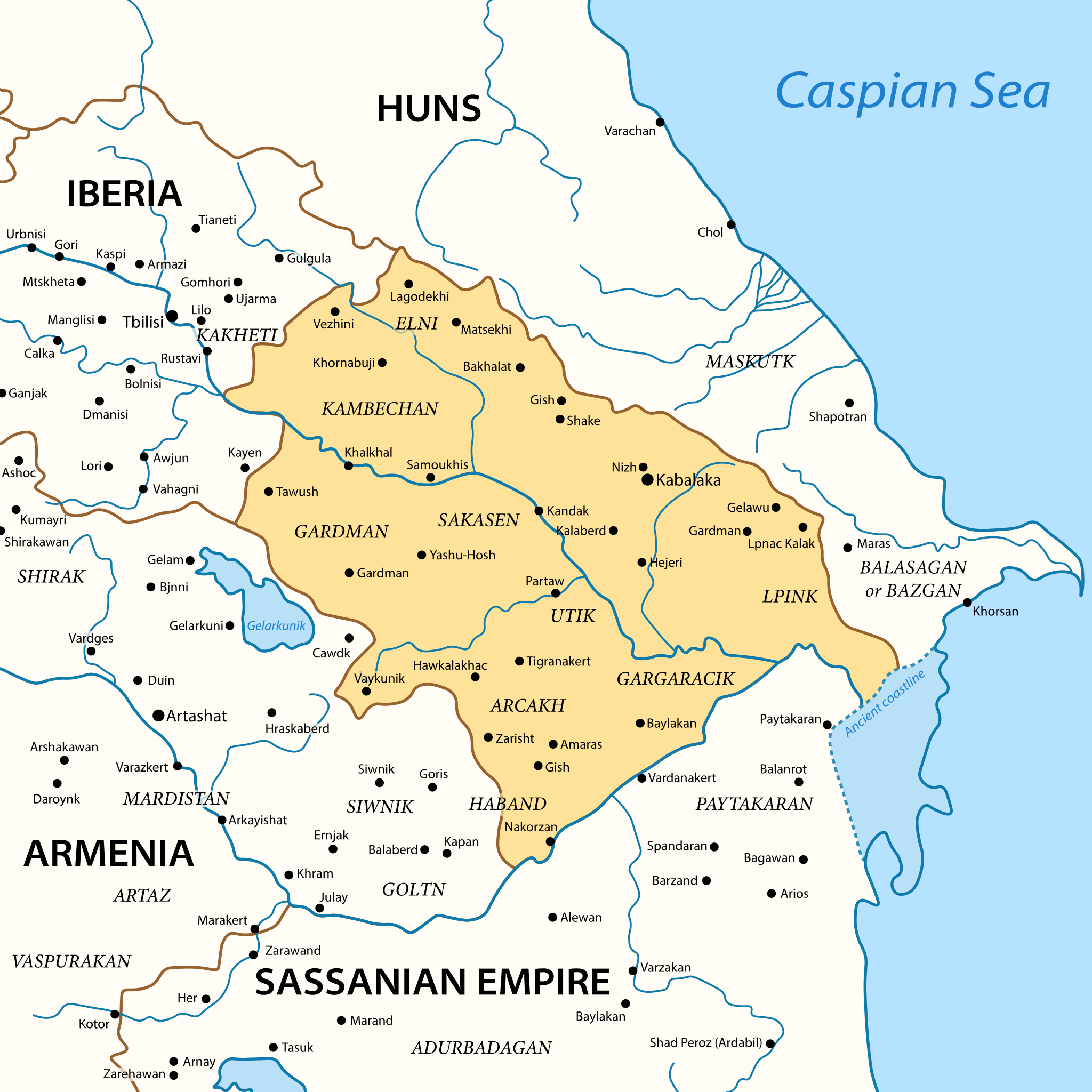
Caucasian Albania in the 5th and 6th centuries

Caucasian Albanians are believed to be the earliest inhabitants of Azerbaijan. Early invaders included the Scythians, who arrived in the region in the 9th century BCE. The South Caucasus was eventually conquered by the Achaemenids around 550 BCE. It was around this period that Zoroastrianism spread in Azerbaijan. The Achaemenids in turn were defeated by Alexander the Great in 330 BCE. Following the decline of the Seleucids in Persia in 247 BCE, an Armenian Kingdom exercised control over parts of modern Azerbaijan between 190 BCE to 428 CE. Caucasian Albanians established a kingdom in the 1st century BCE and largely remained independent until the Sassanids made the kingdom a province in 252 CE. Caucasian Albania's ruler, King Urnayr, officially adopted Christianity as the state religion in the 4th century CE, and Albania would remain a Christian state until the 8th century. Sassanid control ended following their defeat to Muslim Arabs in 642 CE.

== Middle Ages ==
=== Islamic Conquests ===
Caucasus region c. 740, after the end of the Second Arab–Khazar War. The Arab–Khazar wars saw the Caliphate gain control of Azerbaijan.

Muslim Arabs defeated the Sassanids and Byzantines as they marched into the Caucasus region. The Arabs made Caucasian Albania a vassal state after the Christian resistance, led by Prince Javanshir, surrendered in 667. Between the 9th and 10th centuries, Arab authors began to refer to the region between the Kura and Aras rivers as Arran. During this time, Arabs from Basra and Kufa came to Azerbaijan and seized lands that the indigenous peoples had abandoned; the Arabs became a land-owning elite. Despite pockets of continued resistance, the majority of the inhabitants of Azerbaijan converted to Islam. Later on in the 10th and 11th centuries, Kurdish dynasties of Shaddadid and Rawadid ruled parts of Azerbaijan.

=== Shirvanshahs ===
Shīrwān Shāh or Sharwān Shāh, was the title in mediaeval Islamic times of a Persianized dynasty of Arabic origin. The Shirvanshah established a native Azerbaijani state and were rulers of Shirvan, a historical region in present-day Azerbaijan. The Shirvanshahs established the longest Islamic dynasty in the Islamic world.

=== Seljuqs and successor states ===
The Seljuq period of Azerbaijan's history was possibly even more pivotal than the Arab conquest as it helped shape the ethnolinguistic nationality of the modern Azerbaijani Turks.

After the decline of Abbasid Caliphate, the territory of Azerbaijan was under the sway of numerous dynasties such as the Salarids, Sajids, Shaddadids, Rawadids and Buyids. However, at the beginning of the 11th century, the territory was gradually seized by waves of Oghuz Turkic tribes emanating from Central Asia. The first of these Turkic dynasties was the Ghaznavids from northern Afghanistan, who took over part of Azerbaijan by 1030. They were followed by the Seljuqs, a western branch of the Oghuz who conquered all of Iran and the Caucasus and pressed on to Iraq where they overthrew the Buyids in Baghdad in 1055.

=== Safavids and the rise of Shi'a Islam ===
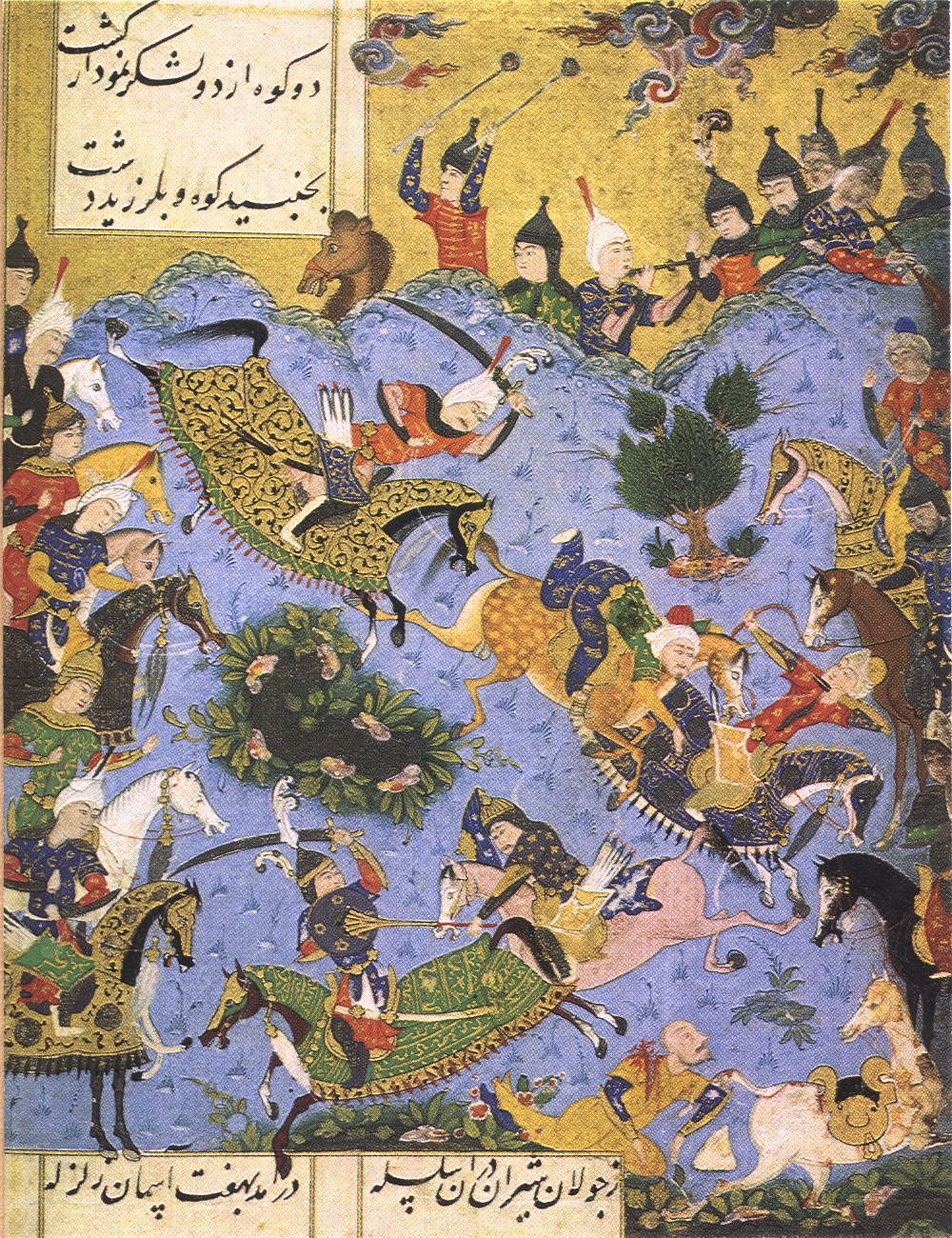
Depiction of a battle between Safaviyya and Shirvanshahs forces during the Safavid conquest of Shirvan in 1501.

The Safavid order (Safaviyeh) was a Sufi religious order formed in 1330s by Sheikh Safi Al-Din (1252–1334), after whom it was eponymously named.

This Sufi order openly converted to the heterodox branch of Twelver Shi'a Islam by the end of the 15th century. Some Safavid followers, most notably the Qizilbash Turks, believed in the mystical and esoteric nature of their rulers and their relationship to the house of Ali, and thus, were zealously predisposed to fight for them. The Safavid rulers claimed to be the descendants of Ali himself and his wife Fatimah, daughter of the Islamic prophet Muhammad, through the seventh Imam Musa al-Kazim. Qizilbash numbers increased by the 16th century and their generals were able to wage a successful war against the Ak Koyunlu state and capture Tabriz.

The Safavids, led by Ismail I, expanded their base, sacking Baku in 1501 and persecuting the Shirvanshahs.

== Russian rule ==
Following their defeat by Russia in the Russo-Persian War of 1803–13, Qajar Persia was forced to sign the Treaty of Gulistan in 1813, which acknowledged the loss of the territory to Russia. Local khanates were either abolished (like in Baku or Ganja) or accepted Russian patronage.

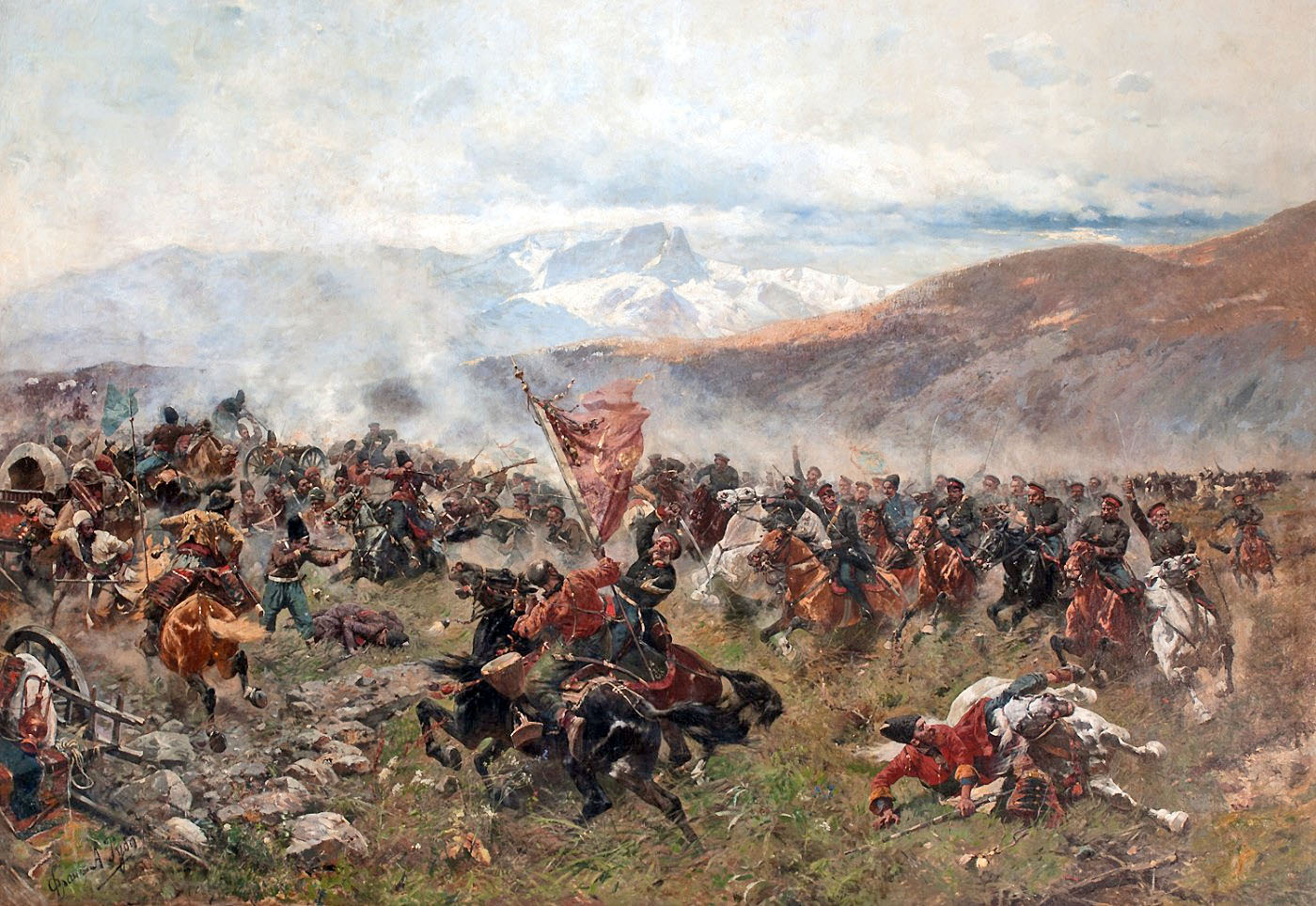
The Battle of Ganja was a battle that took place in the Russo-Persian War of 1826–1828.

Another Russo-Persian war in 1826–28 resulted in another crushing defeat for the Iranian army. The Russians dictated another final settlement as per the Treaty of Turkmenchay, which resulted in the Qajars of Persia ceding Caucasian territories in 1828. The treaty established the current borders of Azerbaijan and Iran as the rule of local khans ended. In the Russian-controlled territories, two provinces were established that later constituted the bulk of the modern Republic – Elisavetpol (Ganja) province in the west, and Shamakha province in the east.

=== Russian Civil War ===
Following the collapse of the Russian Empire during the Russian Civil War, the administrations in the Caucasus initially formed the Transcaucasian Commissariat in 1917. In April 1918, the Transcaucasian Democratic Federative Republic was proclaimed, which was an attempt to form a federal union with the Republic Armenia and the Democratic Republic of Georgia. The federal republic would dissolve a month later, and the Azerbaijani Democratic Republic was proclaimed in Ganja on May 28, 1918. This was the first Democratic Republic established in Islamic World.

== Azerbaijan Democratic Republic ==
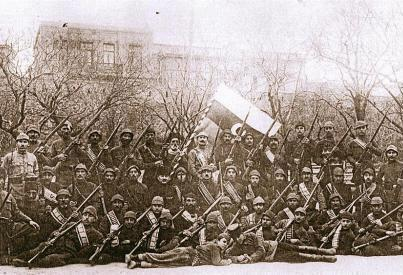
Soldiers from the newly formed Azerbaijan Democratic Republic in 1918.

Among the important accomplishments of the Parliament of the newly formed democratic republic was the extension of suffrage to women, making Azerbaijan the first Muslim state in the world to give women equal political rights with men. In this accomplishment, Azerbaijan preceded even such developed countries as the United Kingdom and the United States. Another important accomplishment of ADR was the establishment of Baku State University, which was the first modern-type university founded in Azerbaijan.

The history of the modern Azerbaijan army dates back to Azerbaijan Democratic Republic in 1918, when the Armed Forces of Azerbaijan Republic were created on June 26, 1918. The first de facto Minister of Defense of ADR was Dr. Khosrov bey Sultanov. When the Ministry was formally established, Gen. Samad bey Mehmandarov became the minister, and Lt-Gen. Aliagha Shikhlinski his deputy. Chiefs of Staff of ADR Army were Maj-Gen. Habib Bey Salimov (August 1, 1918 – March 26, 1919), Lt-Gen. Mammad bey Shulkevich (March 26, 1919 – December 10, 1919) and Maj-Gen. Abdulhamid bey Gaytabashi (December 10, 1919 – April 28, 1920).

Some of Azerbaijan Democratic Republic's notable generals include:

- Lieutenant-General Samad bey Mehmandarov (1855–1931)
- Lieutenant-General, Ali-Agha Shikhlinski (1865–1943)
- General-Adjutant, Huseyn Khan Nakhchivanski (1863–1919)
- Major-General, Abdulhamid Bey Gaytabashi (1884–1920)
- Major-General, Habib Bey Salimov (1881–1920)
- Major-General, Ibrahim bey Usubov (1875–1920)
- Major-General, Murad Girey Tlekhas (1874–1920)
- Major-General, Emir-Kazim Mirza Qajar (1853–1920)
- Major-General, Mammad Mirza Qajar (1872–1920)
- Major-General, Aliyar-Bek Gashimbekow (1856–1920)
- Major-General, David-Bek Edigarow (1881–1920)
- Major-General, Firidun-Bey Wezirow (1850–1925)
- Major-General, Khalil-Bey Talishkhanov (1859–1920)

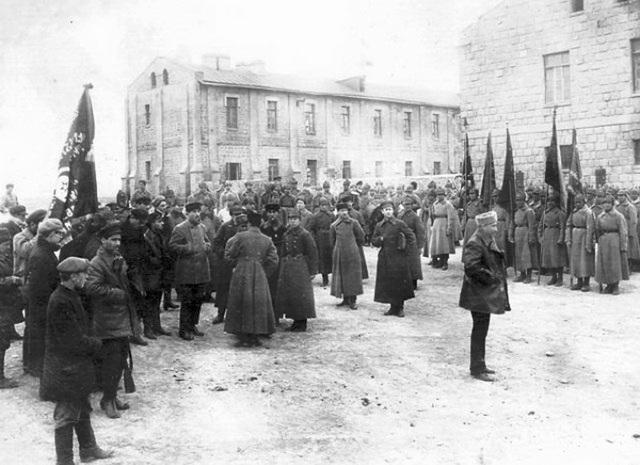
In April 1920, Soviet forces invaded Azerbaijan, leading to the dissolution of the Azerbaijan Democratic Republic.

The Red Army invaded Azerbaijan on April 28, 1920. Although the bulk of the newly formed Azerbaijani army was engaged in putting down an Armenian revolt that had just broken out in Karabakh, the Azerbaijanis did not surrender their brief independence of 1918–20 quickly or easily. As many as 20,000 of the total 30,000 soldiers died resisting what was effectively a Russian reconquest. The national Army of Azerbaijan was abolished by the Bolshevik government, 15 of the 21 army generals were executed by the Bolsheviks.

=== Navy ===
The Azerbaijani Navy was established in 1918. When the Russian Empire collapsed, ADR inherited the entire Russian Caspian flotilla. Among the vessels of the ADR were the gunboats Kars, Ardahan, Astrabad, Geok-Tepe, Arax and Bailov. The British also handed over a warship to the newly independent Azerbaijan – a former Russian vessel in the Caspian Sea.

== Soviet Azerbaijan ==
=== World War II ===
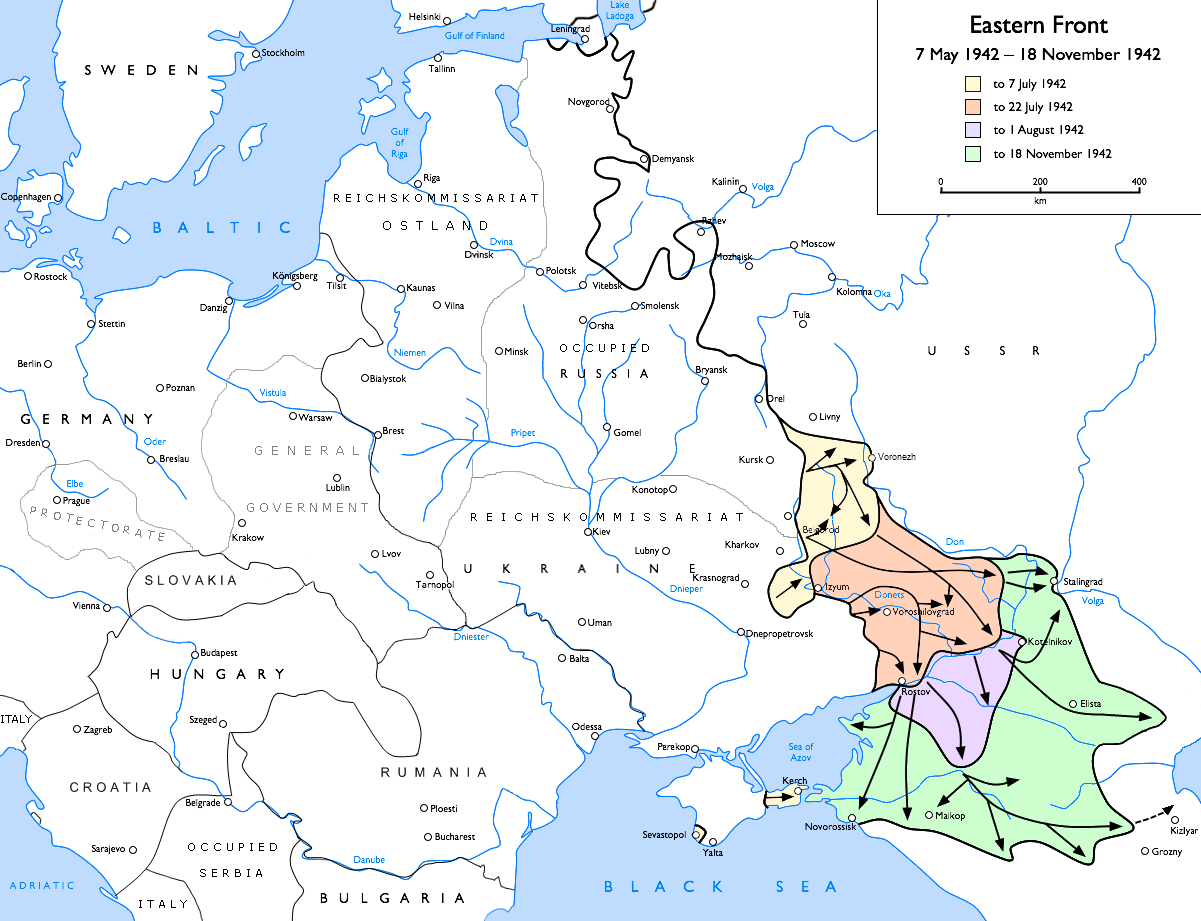
In 1942, Nazi Germany launched Operation Edelweiss, in order to gain control of the Caucasus, and capture the oil fields of Baku.

During World War II, Azerbaijan played a crucial role in the strategic energy policy of the Soviet Union; much of the Soviet Union's oil on the Eastern Front was supplied by Baku. By the Decree of the Supreme Soviet of the USSR in February 1942, the commitment of more than 500 workers and employees of the oil industry of Azerbaijan was awarded orders and medals. Operation Edelweiss carried out by the German Wehrmacht targeted Baku because of its importance as a petroleum supplier of the USSR. Some 800,000 Azerbaijanis fought in the ranks of the Soviet Army, 400,000 of whom perished in the war. Azerbaijani Major-General Hazi Aslanov was twice awarded the Hero of the Soviet Union. National military formations of the Red Army were formed in all republics, including Azerbaijan. The following Azerbaijani national units were created during the war:

- 27th Mountain Division
- 77th Mountain Rifle Division named for Sergo Ordzhonikidze
- 151st Infantry Division
- 217th Infantry Division
- 223rd Infantry Division
- 227th Infantry Division
- 271st Rifle Division
- 396th Infantry Division
- 402nd Rifle Division
- 416th Rifle Division

87 battalions and 1123 self-defense squads were also created in the territory of the Azerbaijan SSR.

Mobilization affected all spheres of life. The oil workers extended their work to 12-hour shifts, with no days off, no holidays, and no vacations until the end of the war. Baku became the primary strategic goal of Hitler's 1942 Fall Blau offensive. The German army was at first stalled in the mountains of Caucasus, then decisively defeated at the Battle of Stalingrad and forced to retreat.

Similarly to other peoples of the Caucasus, some Azerbaijanis joined the German side. These units included:

- Aserbaidschanische Legion
- Freiwilligen-Stamm-Regiment 2
- Azerbaijani Waffen SS Volunteer Formations

=== Soviet-Afghan War ===
Around 10,000 Azerbaijani nationals took part in the Soviet–Afghan War under the Soviet Army, 200 of whom perished.

== Present republic ==
=== First Nagorno-Karabakh War ===
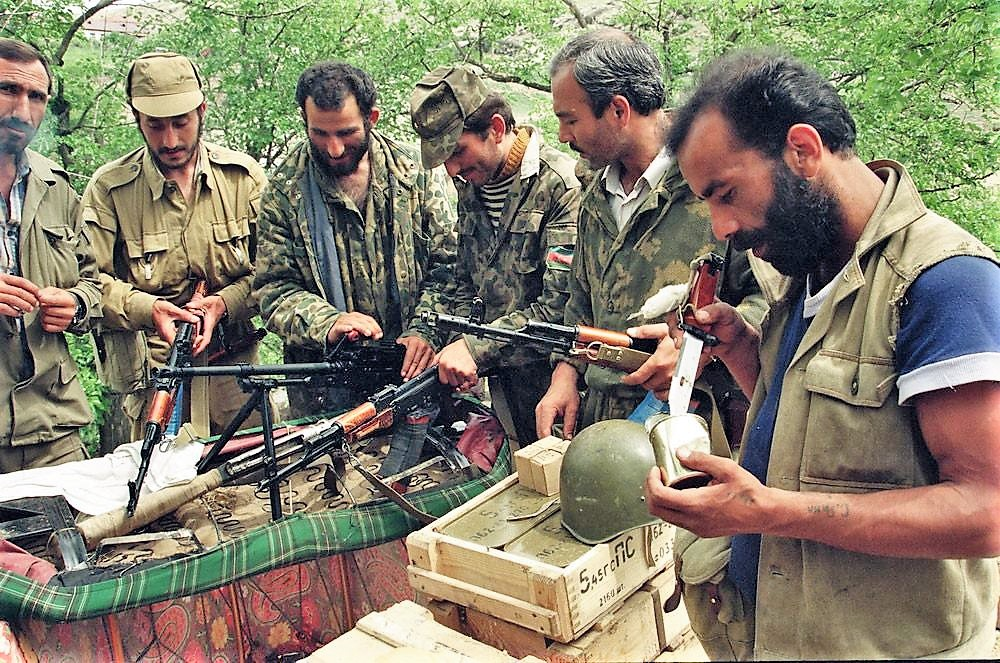
Azerbaijani soldiers during the First Nagorno-Karabakh War, 1992.

In summer 1992, the Defense Ministry of Azerbaijan, following a resolution by the Azerbaijani president on the privatization of units and formations in Azerbaijani territory, forwarded an ultimatum demanding control over vehicles and armaments of the 135th and 139th motorized rifle regiments of the 295th Motor Rifle Division. Azerbaijan had been the deployment area of units of the 4th Army that consisted of four motorized rifle divisions (23rd, 60th, 296th and 75th) and prescribed army units that included missile and air defense brigades and artillery and rocket regiments. It also hosted the 49th arsenal of the Main Agency of Missiles and Artillery of the Ministry of Defense of the Russian Federation, which contained over 7,000 train-car loads of ammunition to the excess of one billion units. The transfer of the property of the 4th Army (except for part of the property of the 366th motorized rifle regiment of the 23rd division captured by Armenian armed formations in 1992 during the regiment's withdrawal from Stepanakert) and the 49th arsenal was completed in 1992. Thus, by the end of 1992, Azerbaijan received arms and military hardware sufficient for approximately four motorized rifle divisions with prescribed army units. It also inherited 50 combat aircraft from the disbanded 19th Air Defense Army and naval ships.

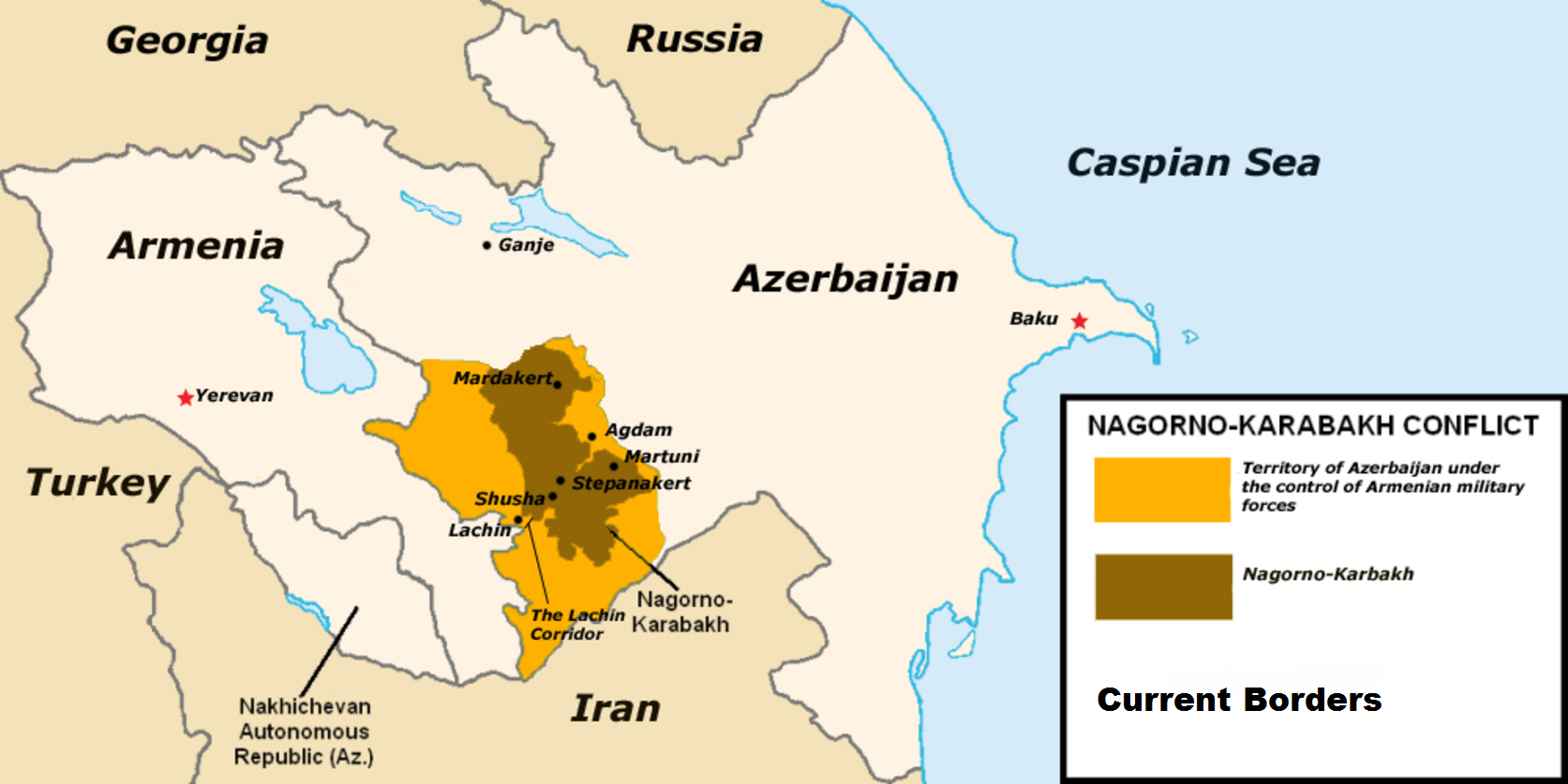
Military situation of Nagorno-Karabakh in May 2016.

The Azerbaijani army suffered a series of significant defeats to Armenia during the 1992–1994 First Nagorno-Karabakh War, which resulted in the loss of control of Nagorno-Karabakh proper and seven surrounding raions, comprising 16% of the territory of Azerbaijan. Azerbaijani sources claim that Armenian victory was largely due to military help from Russia and the wealthy Armenian diaspora, while Armenians partially deny the allegation, stating that Russia was equally supplying Armenian and Azerbaijani sides with weapons and mercenaries. The Azerbaijani army employed Russian, Ukrainian, Chechen and Afghan mercenaries and was aided by Turkish military advisers during the war.

=== 21st century ===
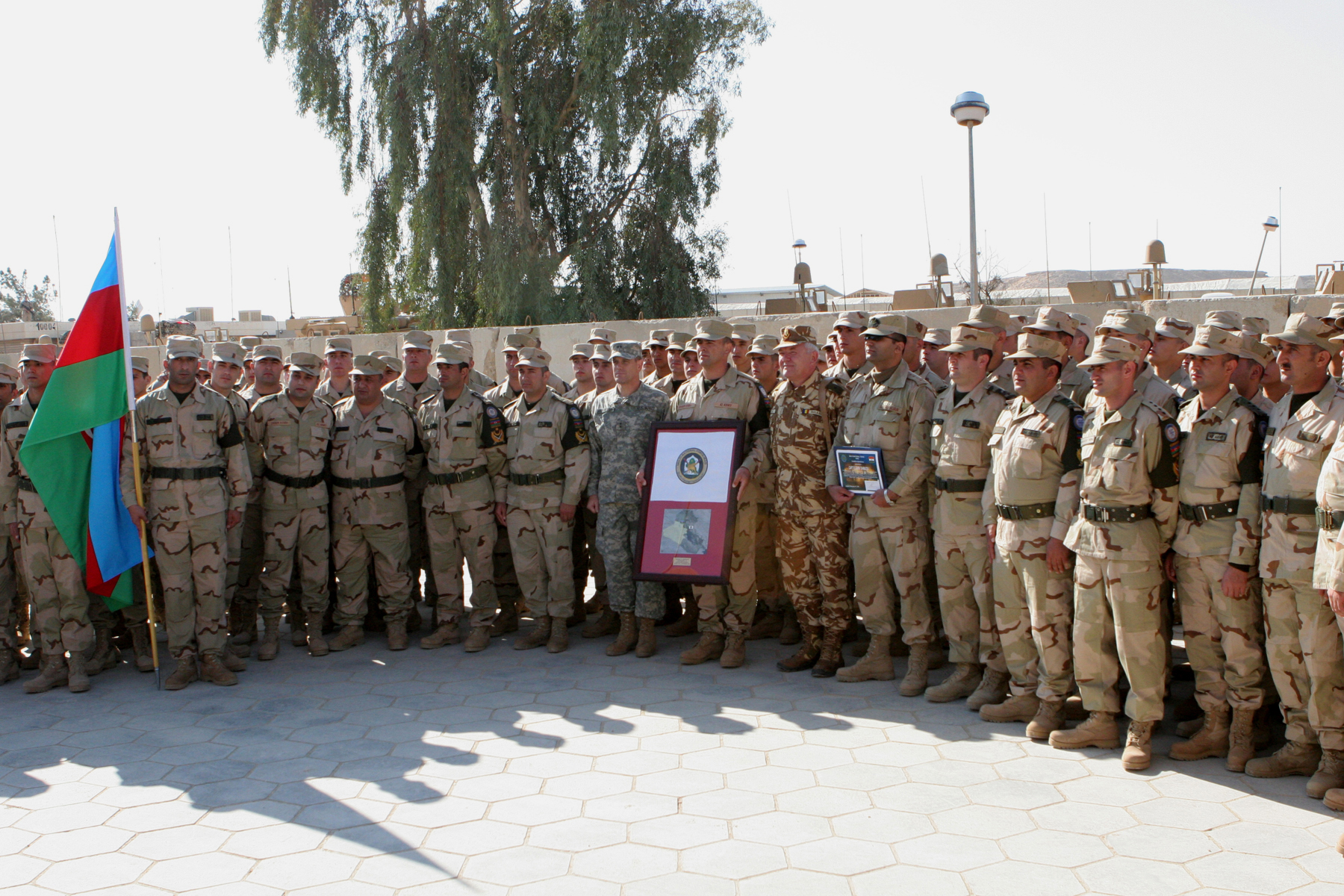
Soldiers from the 1st Azerbaijani Peacekeeping Company in Al Asad Airbase, during the Iraq War.

The Azerbaijani Armed Forces were re-established on October 9, 1991, in accordance with the Law of the Republic of Azerbaijan on the Armed Forces of Azerbaijan. Initially, the equipment and facilities of Azerbaijan's army were those of the 4th Army (Soviet Union). Since the fall of the Soviet Union, Azerbaijan has been trying to further develop its armed forces into a professional, well-trained, and mobile military. Since 2005 Azerbaijan has increased its military budget to $2.46 billion in 2009.

Azerbaijan has its own defense industry, which manufactures small arms and military aircraft. There are hopes to produce other military equipment.

Azerbaijan joined the multi-national force during the Iraq War, and from 2006 to 2008 sent troops to the northern parts of Iraq. Azerbaijan provided 250 troops. One hundred soldiers were sent on December 29, 2004, to reinforce the 150 soldiers already in the country. They provided security for the local Turkmen people, as well as for religious sites and convoys. Troops from Azerbaijan serve with the NATO-led International Security Assistance Force in Afghanistan. The widespread use of drones in the ongoing Nagorno-Karabakh conflict is a novelty not only in the military history of Azerbaijan but also in general.

=== Second Nagorno-Karabakh War ===
Clashes began on the morning of 27 September 2020 along the Line of Contact. Total casualties were in the low thousands. Following the capture of Shusha, the second-largest settlement in Nagorno-Karabakh, by Azerbaijani forces, a ceasefire agreement was signed between Azerbaijan and Armenia, ending all hostilities in the area. Under the agreement, Armenia returned the surrounding territories it occupied in 1994 to Azerbaijan while Azerbaijan gained land access to its Nakhchivan exclave.

== See also ==
- History of Azerbaijan
- List of wars involving Azerbaijan
