= Rufat Amirov =

Azerbaijani general

Rufat Amirov Rüfət Əmirov

Acting Chief of General Staff of Azerbaijani Armed Forces
- In office May 1992 – May 1992
- President: Heydar Aliyev
- Preceded by: Shahin Musayev
- Succeeded by: Valeh Barshadly

Personal details
- Born: Azerbaijan

Military service
- Branch/service: Azerbaijani Armed Forces
- Rank: Colonel
- Battles/wars: First Nagorno-Karabakh War

Colonel Rufat Amirov (Azerbaijani: Rüfət Əmirov) is a retired military officer who had served as the acting Chief of General Staff of Azerbaijani Armed Forces and Deputy Minister of Defense of Azerbaijan Republic. He was appointed to both positions in 1992 after General Major Shahin Musayev was removed. He was then replaced by Lieutenant General Valeh Barshadly as Chief of General Staff but continued as Deputy Defense Minister through 1996.

Amirov is currently a reserve officer and Director of Military History Museum of the Ministry of Defense of Azerbaijan Republic.

== See also ==
- Azerbaijani Army
- Ministers of Defense of Azerbaijan Republic
- Safar Abiyev
