= Nuraddin Sadigov =

Azerbaijani military officer

Nuraddin Sadiqov Nurəddin Sadıqov

Chief of the General Staff of the Azerbaijani Armed Forces
- In office 4 September 1992 – 17 June 1993
- President: Abulfaz Elchibey; Heydar Aliyev
- Preceded by: Valeh Barshadly
- Succeeded by: Safar Abiyev (acting); Najmeddin Sadikov

Personal details
- Born: 5 December 1935 Julfa Rayon, Nakhichevan ASSR, Azerbaijan SSR, USSR
- Died: 22 December 2009 (aged 74) Baku, Azerbaijan

Military service
- Branch/service: Azerbaijani Armed Forces
- Rank: Major General
- Battles/wars: First Nagorno-Karabakh War

Major General Nuraddin Sadig oglu Sadigov (Azerbaijani: Nurəddin Sadıq oğlu Sadıqov; 1935–2009) also known as Nuraddin Sadikhov, was the Chief of the General Staff of the Azerbaijani Armed Forces, Deputy Minister of Defense and National Advisor on Military Issues.

== Early life ==
Sadigov was born in Julfa Rayon, Nakhchivan exclave of Azerbaijan Republic. He graduated from Schors Lviv Combined Arms Command School and the Frunze Military Academy. Starting from December 1991, he served in Azerbaijani Armed Forces.

== Career ==
On 4 September 1992 President of Azerbaijan Abulfaz Elchibey appointed Sadigov Chief of General Staff of Azerbaijani Armed Forces and promoted him to Major General. He served in the position until 17 June 1993, when Deputy Minister of Defense Safar Abiyev assumed the responsibilities of the minister and was appointed the Chief of Staff. On 3 February 1999 President Heydar Aliyev relieved Sadigov from his duties of National Advisor on Military Issues. Sadigov is credited with having led several successful operations from Kalbajar and Qubadli in the direction of Lachin in September and October 1992 during First Nagorno-Karabakh War. In 2007, Sadigov resigned from the military due to his age. He died on 22 December 2009. A school in Alakol village in Tovuz Rayon was named after Sadigov.

== See also ==
- Azerbaijani Army
- Ministers of Defense of Azerbaijan Republic
- Safar Abiyev
