= Nuraddin (given name) =

Nuraddin is a given name. Notable people with the name include:

- Nuraddin Novruzov (born 2003), Azerbaijani wrestler
- Nuraddin Sadigov (1935–2009), Azerbaijani general
