= Alakol =

Alakol may refer to the following places in:

== Azerbaijan ==
- Alakol, Azerbaijan, a village

== Kazakhstan ==
Alakol or Ala-Kol (Алакөл, Alakölʹ) is the name of:

- Alakol, Almaty Region
- Alakol, Amangeldi District, Kostanay Region 50.4981°N 65.1279°E
- Alakol, Denisov District, Kostanay Region 53.2763°N 65.1279°E
- Alakol, Pavlodar Region 54.0763°N 75.9076°E
- Alakol, West Kazakhstan Region 49.6308°N 53.6743°E
- Lake Alakol
- Alakol Biosphere Reserve
- Alakol (Astrakhan District)
- Another name for lake Itishpes
- Alakol District in Almaty Region
- Alakol Zapovednik

== Kyrgyzstan ==
- Ala-Köl, a lake

== See also ==
- Alakul culture
