= Tahir Aliyev =

Azerbaijani military officer

- Tahir Əliyev
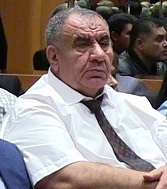

Minister of Defense of Azerbaijan
- In office February 24, 1992 – March 16, 1992
- President: Ayaz Mutalibov, Yagub Mammadov (acting)
- Preceded by: Shahin Musayev
- Succeeded by: Rahim Gaziyev

Minister of Internal Affairs of Azerbaijan
- In office February 24, 1992 – March 16, 1992
- Preceded by: Shahin Musayev
- Succeeded by: Rahim Gaziyev

Chairman of State Customs Committee of Azerbaijan
- In office February 24, 1992 – March 16, 1992
- Preceded by: Shahin Musayev
- Succeeded by: Rahim Gaziyev

Military service
- Branch/service: Azerbaijani Armed Forces
- Rank: Major General

Tahir Yunis oghlu Aliyev (Azerbaijani: Tahir Yunis oğlu Əliyev) was the Minister of Defense of Azerbaijan, Minister of Internal Affairs of Azerbaijan Republic and Chairman of State Customs Committee.

== Career ==
Aliyev's first political appointment was with Defense Council of Azerbaijan Republic created on September 29, 1991 on orders of President of Azerbaijan Ayaz Mutalibov in order to ensure security and defense of Azerbaijan. He was among 8 members of the council who were to assist in state security issues.

On December 25, 1991 he was appointed Chief of Department of Ministry of Internal Affairs for Karabakh region of Azerbaijan. He was subsequently promoted to the rank of General Major and appointed Minister of Defense of Azerbaijan Republic on February 24, 1992 at the time of escalation of the First Nagorno-Karabakh War and two days before the Khojaly Massacre. Tahir Aliyev replaced the interim minister, Shahin Musayev who was Chief of General Staff of Azerbaijani Armed Forces at the time. Musayev had temporarily taken over the ministry once the previous Minister of Defense, Tajeddin Mehdiyev was sacked on February 17, 1992 for his inability to hold the front and avoid capture of strategic villages Karkijahan, Malibeyli and Gushchular and Garadaghly in Karabakh.

On March 16, 1992, Aliyev was removed from the post of Defense Minister by acting President of Azerbaijan, Yagub Mammadov and appointed the Minister of Internal Affairs of Azerbaijan on March 17, 1992. He remained in the position until April 25, 1992.

After Heydar Aliyev assumed the interim presidential responsibilities as the Speaker of the National Assembly of Azerbaijan in June 1993, Tahir Aliyev was appointed Chairman of State Customs Committee on July 28, 1993. Due to excessive corruption practices and illegal deals conducted by Tahir Aliyev, he was dishonorably relieved of his duties and sacked by President Heydar Aliyev on January 9, 1995.

== See also ==
- Azerbaijani Army
- Ministers of Defense of Azerbaijan Republic
