= Military Police (Azerbaijan) =

Military police of Azerbaijan

- Active: 10 April 1992-present
- Country: Azerbaijan
- Branch: Armed Forces of Azerbaijan
- Type: Military Police
- Part of: Ministry of Defense
- Garrison/HQ: Baku

The Military Police of the Ministry of Defense of Azerbaijan (Azerbaijani: Azərbaycan Respublikası Müdafiə Nazirliyi.Hərbi Polis) is the military police branch of the Republic of Azerbaijan.

== Overview ==
It was established on 10 April 1992 by the order of the Minister of Defense.

== Action during the Karabakh conflict ==
The military police personnel took an active part during Operation Iron Fist in 2020. Military police were involved in ensuring security in human settlements and places of deployment in the liberated territories. They also served at mobile checkpoints on military transport movement routes. Cargo of the Russian peacekeepers in Nagorno-Karabakh were escorted by the military police through the Barda-Agdam-Khankendi route.

== List of commanders ==
- Colonel Rovshan Maharramov (-2010)
- Badir Hasanov (2010-?)

== See also ==
- Military Police (Russia)
- 032 Military Unit
- Military Police (Kazakhstan)
