= 2013 Baku protests =

Protests in the capital Baku, in Azerbaijan 2013

- Date: January 12, 2013
- Location: Baku, Azerbaijan
- Caused by: Death of Ceyhun Qubadov

Parties
Azerbaijani police	Protesters

Number
	500

A protest took place on January 12, 2013 in Baku, Azerbaijan after Azerbaijani Army soldier Ceyhun Qubadov was found dead on January 7, 2013. The cause of death was first reported as a heart attack. Qubadov's family asked for an investigation as they believed that he was murdered.

On January 10, 2013, a Facebook event was created. A day later about 13,600 joined it, the next day the number of users joined was 20,000.

Hundreds of protesters gathered at the Fountains Square on January 12 with demands of resignation of Safar Abiyev, the Azerbaijani Defense Minister. They held slogans such as "Stop killing our soldiers" and "You must answer to us."

== Aftermath ==
Immediately after the investigation, the Azerbaijani Defense Minister Safar Abiyev was fired by the President of Azerbaijan Ilham Aliyev. Colonel General Zakir Hasanov took his place.
