= Jamshid Nakhchivanski Military Lyceum =

Military school in Baku, Azerbaijan

- Cəmşid Naxçıvanski adına Hərbi Lisey
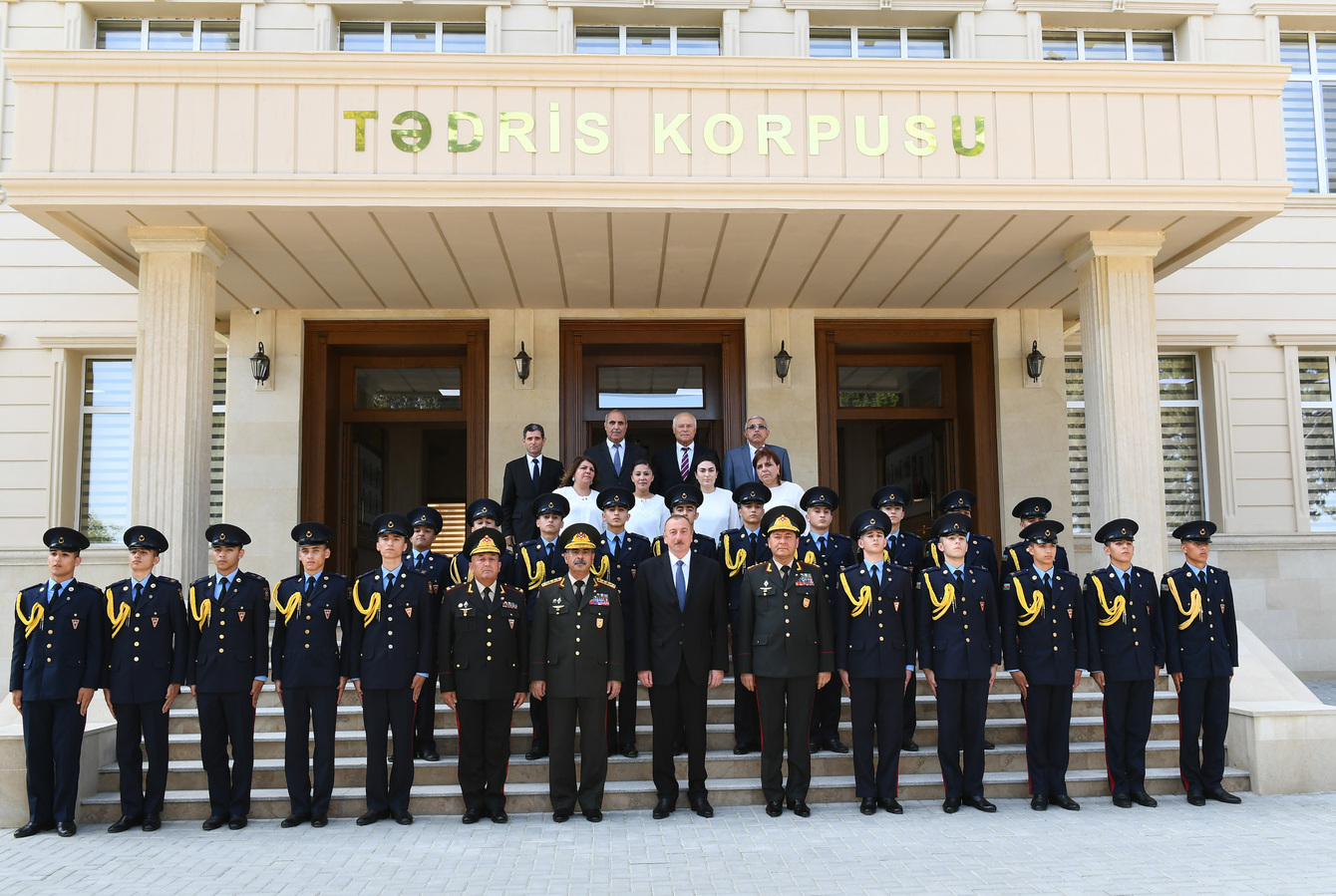
- President Ilham Aliyev and Colonel General Zakir Hasanov with cadets of the lyceum.
- Type: State
- Established: 1971
- Rector: Major General Bekir Orujev
- Students: 2400
- Location: Baku, Azerbaijan; 40.3468°N 49.9646°E
- Campus: Urban
- Website: www.cnaxcivanski.azersayt.com
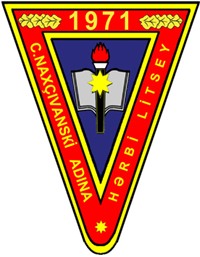

- Location within Azerbaijan

Jamshid Nakhchivanski Military Lyceum (Azerbaijani: Cəmşid Naxçıvanski adına Hərbi Lisey), also known as Military Lyceum named after Jamshid Nakhchivanski, is a state school, specializing in education and training of students in military science and preparing them for professional military service. The lyceum is located in the suburbs of Baku, Azerbaijan.

== History ==
The lyceum was established on July 28, 1971 by the decree No. 331 of the Central Committee of the Communist Party of Azerbaijan SSR at initiative of the First Secretary of Azerbaijan Communist Party and later President of Azerbaijan, Heydar Aliyev on the basis of an eight-year Baku boarding school No. 2. The initial name of the school was "Specialized boarding school of the republic". The school was subordinated to the Ministry of Education of Azerbaijan SSR. In November 1971, Heydar Aliyev named it after Azerbaijani general, Major General Jamshid Nakhchivanski. Nakhchivanski was a well known military professional who liberated Shusha in 1918 but was the victim of Joseph Stalin's purge of the armed forces officer corps in 1938. The establishment of the school was not unequivocally welcomed by Soviet military leaders, who saw sending Azerbaijani youth to the Suvorov Military School and Nakhimov Naval School as being more beneficial.

From 1976 through 1981, government provided financial and technical assistance to the lyceum to enhance the activities of the school. In 1986, the school was renamed by the Ministry of Education to 'Boarding School for students studying Russian and increased military training'. On October 28, 1991, the school was transferred from the Ministry of Education to Ministry of Defense by decree No. 65 and on November 18, 1991 was renamed to "Baku secondary school Jamshid Nakhchivanski" by Presidential decree No. 377. It was then renamed again by Heydar Aliyev to "Jamshid Nakhchivanski Military Lyceum" on November 24, 1997.

== Student body ==
At the time of establishment, there were only 49 cadets from first enrollment in 1971 who graduated in 1974. At present, the lyceum welcomes 800 cadets annually, 600 of which study in Baku and 200 study in the former lyceum branch in Nakhchivan. The lyceum program consists of three year intensive study. Annually hundreds of young military professionals graduate from the lyceum. Many graduates continue their higher education in military schools in Russia, Turkey, Pakistan, and Italy. By 2009, the lyceum had produced 8,909 graduates: 10 of whom became generals and one admiral.

== Student life ==
=== Heydar Aliyev as its patron ===
Heydar Aliyev has always paid special attention to this educational military establishment. In 1994, he hosted a Victory Day ceremony at the school. During the ceremony, he noted that many of its staff, "are graduates of this high school" and that he feels "very happy when they say that they saw me and heard my advice in this school". On April 21, 2003 he collapsed on the stage due to severe drop in blood pressure while addressing the graduates of the lyceum on the occasion of anniversary of the school. Aliyev died a few months later. Every year, the cadets hold events commemorating the founder of their school.

=== Activities ===
Cadets of the lyceum are participants in all military parades in Azerbaijan, particularly national parades in Baku, acting as the corps of drums. During the Baku Victory Parade of 2020, a detached formation from the lyceum took part in the parade.

=== 50th anniversary ===
Minister of Defense Zakir Hasanov approved an action plan by President Ilham Aliyev on the celebration of the 50th anniversary of the Military Lyceum. A series of events dedicated to the 50th anniversary of the Military Lyceum was held on 19 April 2021 in the Army Corps, formations, and special military-educational institutions.

== Notable people ==
=== Alumni ===
- Zakir Hasanov, Minister of Defense of Azerbaijan (class of 1976)
- Elchin Guliyev, Chief of State Border Service of Azerbaijan Republic (class of 1984)
- Ramil Safarov, an officer of the Azerbaijani Army who was convicted of the 2004 murder of Armenian Army Lieutenant Gurgen Margaryan during a NATO-sponsored training in Budapest.
- Asif Hajili, member of the Union of Azerbaijani Writers
- Shukur Hamidov, a National Hero of Azerbaijan
- Murad Mirzayev, former officer in the Special Forces of Azerbaijan.
- Mais Barkhudarov, a participant of the 2016 Nagorno-Karabakh clashes and 2020 Nagorno-Karabakh conflict.
- Ramiz Tahirov, Commander of Azerbaijani Air Forces (class of 1983)
- Zaur Guliyev, a Hero of the Patriotic War

=== Staff ===
- Valeh Barshadly, 1st Minister of Defense of Azerbaijan (served as head of the lyceum from 1993-1999)
- Chingiz Babayev, a Senior Lieutenant of lyceum who was awarded the title of the National Hero of Azerbaijan for saving lives during the 1995 Baku Metro fire.

== Gallery ==
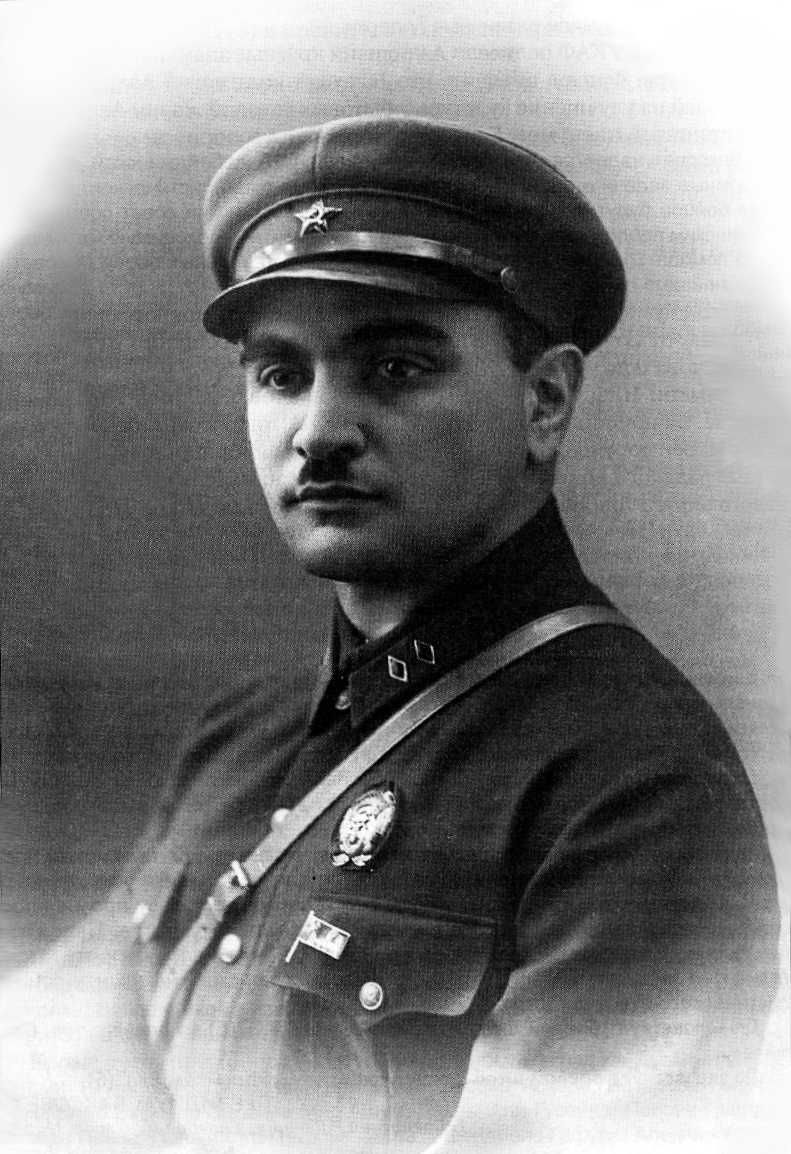
Jamshid Nakhchivanski

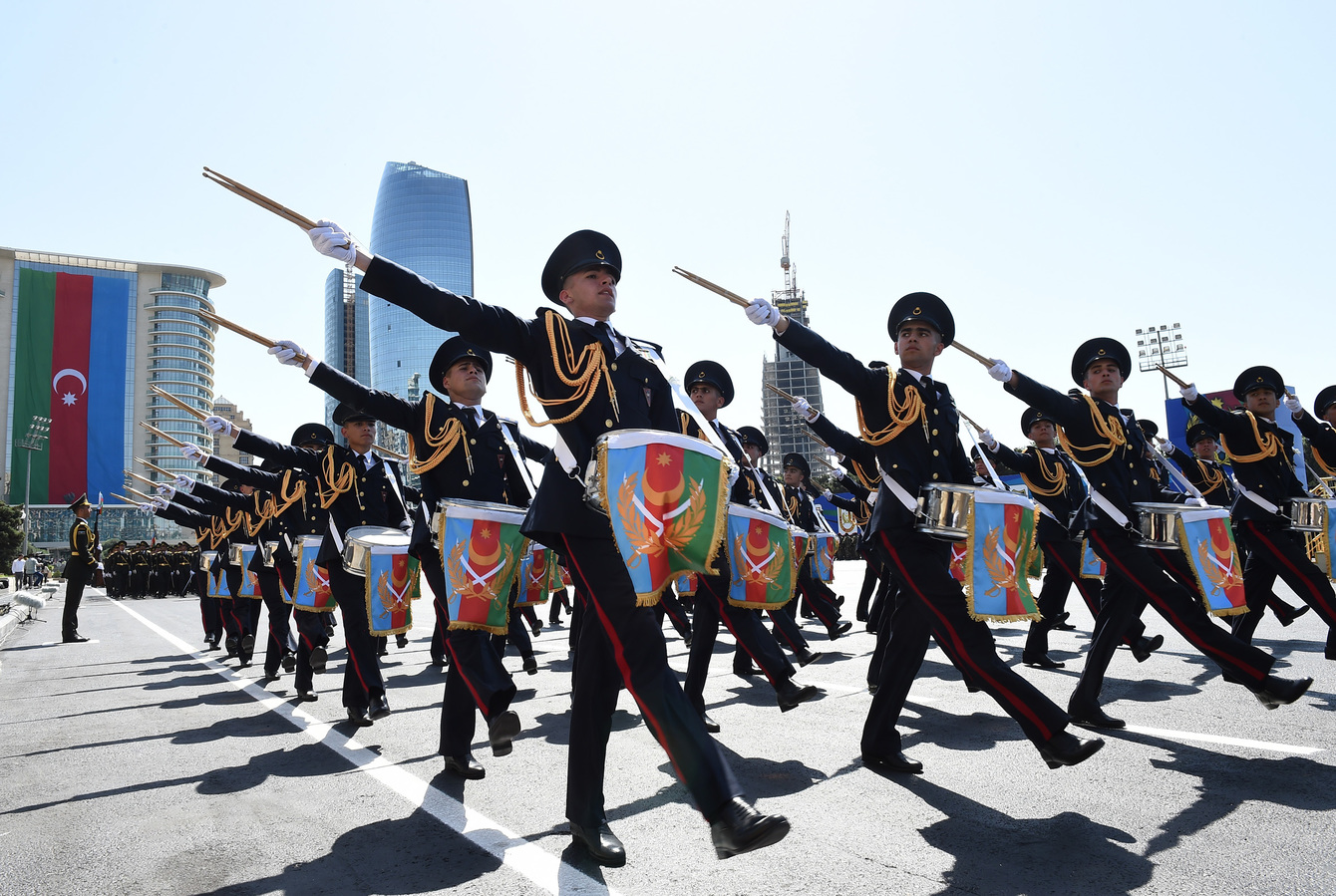
Cadets of the lyceum's corps of drums during the 2018 Day of the Armed Forces parade.

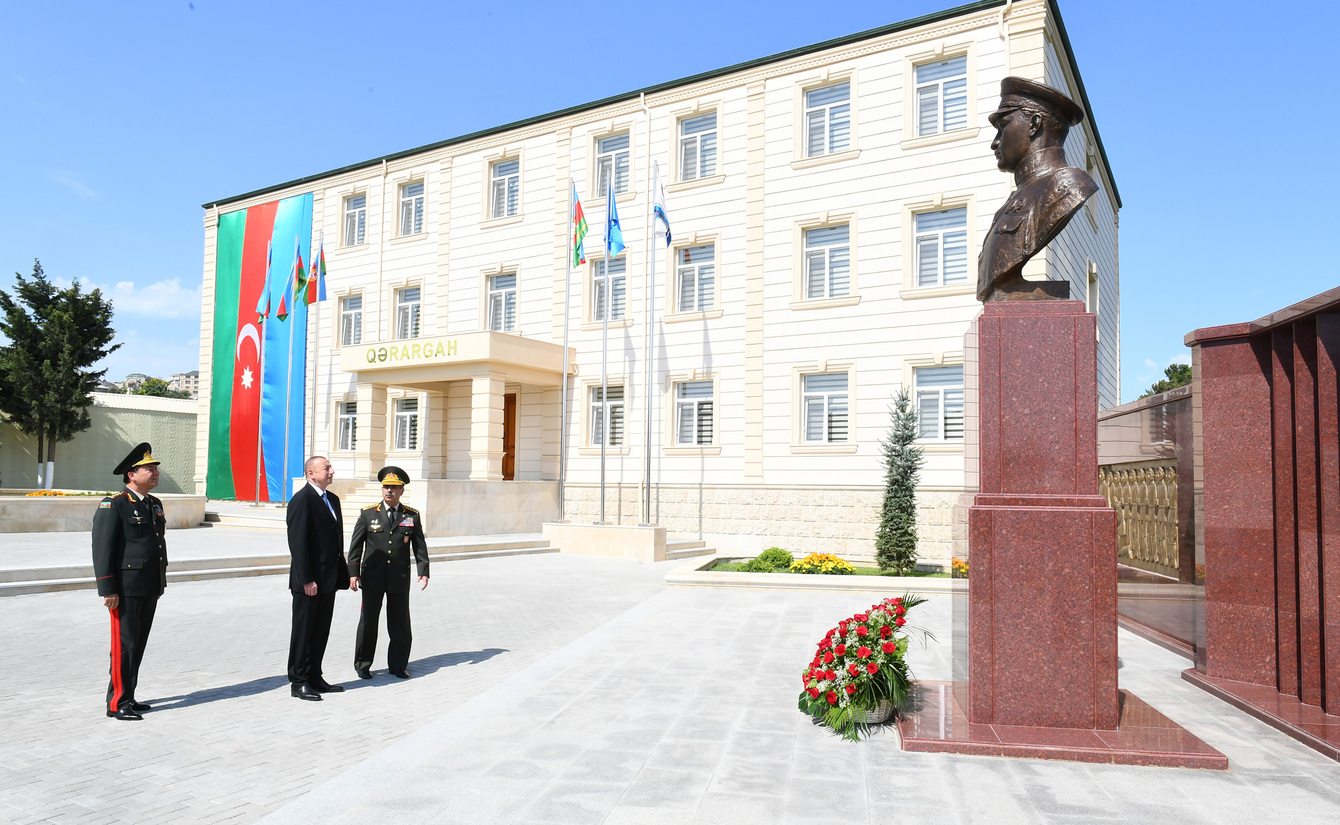
A memorial at the lyceum.

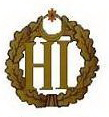
Badge of the lyceum.

== See also ==
- Azerbaijani Armed Forces
- Minister of Defense of Azerbaijan
