= Agil Gurbanov =

Deputy Minister of Defense of the Republic of Azerbaijan

- Aqil Səlim oğlu Qurbanov
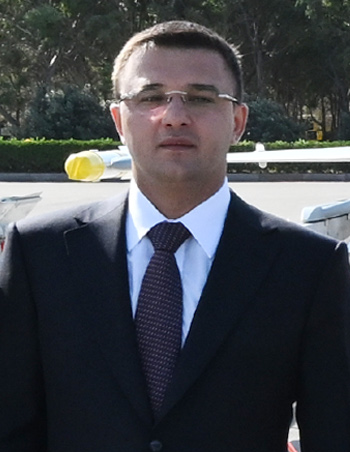

Deputy Minister of Defense Military-Director General
- Incumbent
- Assumed office 13 July 2023
- President: Ilham Aliyev
- Prime Minister: Ali Asadov
- Minister: Zakir Hasanov

Personal details
- Born: 15 August 1986 (age 40) Baku, Azerbaijan
- Children: 2

Agil Salim oglu Gurbanov (Azerbaijani: Aqil Səlim oğlu Qurbanov, born 15 August 1986) is an Azerbaijani politician and businessman who serves as the Deputy Minister of Defense of Azerbaijan – Director General.

== Early life and education ==
Agil Salim oglu Gurbanov was born on 15 August 1986, in Baku. In 2004–2008, he studied at the Presidential Academy of Public Administration. In 2012–2014, he studied at the London School of Economics.

He is married and has two children.

== Career ==
In 2015–2019, he was the director of investments at PASHA Holding.

Later, he worked as the chairman of the Supervisory Board of Sumgait Technologies Park.

By the decree of the President Ilham Aliyev on 9 December 2022, he was appointed as the Deputy Minister of Defense For Military-Technical Support.

On February 27, 2023, by the decree of the President Ilham Aliyev, he was appointed as the Deputy Minister of Defense – Chief of the Main Department for Military-Technical Support, and on July 13, 2023, he was appointed as the Deputy Minister of Defense – Director General.

On March 18, 2024, he was appointed as the Chairman of the Supervisory Board of "Azersilah".
