= Dəliməmmədli =

- City
- Location within Azerbaijan
- Coordinates: 40°41′33″N 46°34′29″E
- Country: Azerbaijan
- District: Goranboy

Population (2010)
  - Total: 5,513
- Time zone: UTC+4 (AZT)

Dəliməmmədli (also, Delimammadli) is a city in the Goranboy District of Azerbaijan. It has a population of 5,513. The municipality consists of the city of Delimammadli and Sarovlu.
