= Abdulhamid bey Gaytabashi =

Azerbaijani military commander

Abdulhamid bey Gaytabashi Əbdülhəmid bəy Qaytabaşı
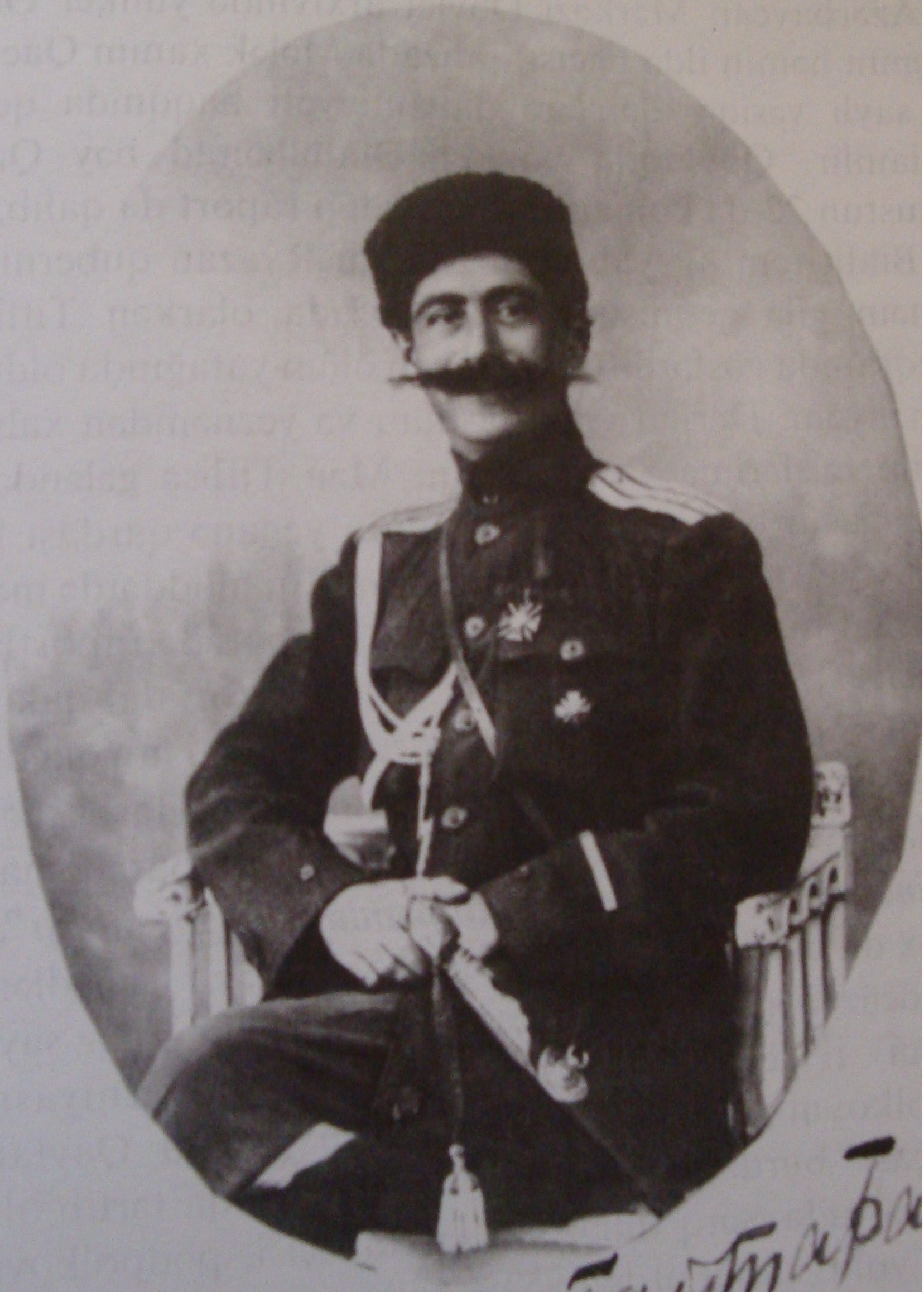

Chief of General Staff of Azerbaijani Armed Forces
- In office December 1919 – April 28, 1920
- Preceded by: Mammad Bey Shulkevich
- Succeeded by: office terminated

Personal details
- Born: 1884 Tiflis
- Died: 1920 (aged 35–36) Baku, Azerbaijani SSR, USSR

Military service
- Branch/service: Azerbaijani Armed Forces
- Years of service: 1908 – 1920
- Rank: Major General
- Battles/wars: Armenian–Azerbaijani War; Soviet invasion of Azerbaijan

Abdulhamid Bey Sharif Bey oglu Gaytabashi (Azerbaijani: Əbdülhəmid bəy Şərif bəy oğlu Qaytabaşı; 1884 - June, 1920) was the last Chief of General Staff of Azerbaijani Armed Forces of Azerbaijan Democratic Republic before its occupation by the Red Army in April 1920.

He participated in World War I and was awarded the Order of Saint Anna 3rd Class, the Order of Saint Vladimir 4th Class, and the Order of Saint Anna 3rd Class for his bravery in battles. On August 20, 1918, he was assigned to the Caucasian Islamic Army headquarters. He took part in several battles for the liberation of Azerbaijan from Bolshevik-Dashnak occupation.

He was executed by firing squad for his support of the Ganja uprising against the Soviet occupation.

== Life and ministry ==
=== In Tsarist Russia ===
Abdulhamid Bey Gaytabashi was born on July 10, 1884, in Tbilisi. In 1908, he graduated from the Pavlovsk Military School. After completing his education, in 1909, he was appointed with the rank of podporuchik to the 261st Shamakhi Infantry Regiment of the 52nd Infantry Division of the 3rd Caucasus Military Corps stationed in Ganja. During World War I, he served as the commander of the 205th Shamakhi Infantry Regiment of the 52nd Infantry Division of the 3rd Caucasus Corps. On October 5, 1914, he was wounded in a battle near the village of Dembnyak. For his bravery in battles, he was awarded the Order of Saint Anna 3rd Class on May 16, 1914, the Order of Saint Vladimir 4th Class on February 26, 1915, and the Order of Saint Anna 3rd Class with the inscription "For Bravery" on February 27, 1915.

On March 6, 1918, Abdulhamid Bey Gaytabashi was appointed as the chief of staff of the Muslim Corps. On March 18, 1918, by the order No. 246 of the Transcaucasian Commissariat government, Abdulhamid Bey Gaytabashi was promoted to the rank of colonel.

== In the Republic of Azerbaijan ==
On August 20, 1918, Abdulhamid Bey Gaytabashi was assigned to the headquarters of the Caucasus Islamic Army. On November 15, 1918, by the order of Azerbaijan's Minister of Defense, Samad Bey Mehmandarov, he was appointed as the duty general in the army's General Staff. By the decision of the Council of Ministers of the Azerbaijan Democratic Republic on June 25, 1919, he was promoted to the rank of major general. On December 10, 1919, after Major General Habib Bey Salimov was appointed as the head of the Baku Fortification Unit, Gaytabashi was temporarily entrusted with the position of Chief of the General Staff. He held this position until the establishment of the General Staff of the Azerbaijani Army.

On February 17, 1920, after Lieutenant General Sulkevich was discharged from the Azerbaijani army, Abdulhamid Bey Gaytabashi was appointed as a member of the commission established to reorganize the Azerbaijani Army Headquarters. By the order of the Minister of Defense, dated March 2, 1920, number 128, the General Staff Department was merged with the General Staff, and Abdulhamid Bey Gaytabashi was confirmed as the Duty General of the Army Headquarters. Until the fall of the Azerbaijan Democratic Republic, he served in active military duty in the rank of major general as the Duty General of the Army Headquarters.

After the April occupation in 1920, he continued to serve as the chief of staff of the Azerbaijani army for one month. In June 1920, he was arrested, accused of involvement in the Ganja uprising. He was taken to Nargin Island and executed there. He has no known grave.

== Family ==
Abdulhamid Bey Gaytabaşı's great-grandfather, Abdulmecid Bey, moved from Istanbul to Tbilisi at the end of the 18th century. After arriving in Tbilisi, he began serving in the Imperial Russian Army. While serving in the Ottoman Army, Abdulmecid Bey was a regiment commander, a position referred to as "Haytabaşı." Abdulmecid Bey adopted the surname "Haytabaşı," which, upon moving to Tbilisi, was translated into Russian as "Gaytabaşı."

Abdulhamid Bey's father, Lieutenant Colonel Sharif Bey Gaytabaşı, was born in Tbilisi on October 26, 1835. According to documents compiled in 1890, he worked as a translator for Eastern languages in the rank of lieutenant colonel in the Office Department of the Central Headquarters of the Russian Army in Tbilisi. Throughout his service, Lieutenant Colonel Sharif Bey was awarded the fourth-degree Order of Saint Vladimir, the second-degree Order of Saint Anna, the second and third-degree Orders of Saint Stanislaus, and several medals. Sharif Bey Gaytabaşı married twice, as his first wife had died. In his second marriage, he wed Khadija Khanum, the daughter of landowner Mirza Aliagha from Shikhli village in the Kazakh district. Their seventh child was Abdulhamid Gaytabaşı.

Abdulhamid Bey Gaytabaşı married Sara Khanum, the daughter of Mashaadi Mahmud. They had two children, Sharif and Khadija.

== Memory ==
In his 1923 book "The Azerbaijani Democratic Republic: Its Formation and Current Situation," Mahammad Amin Rasulzade called Abdulhamid Bey Gaytabashi a martyr for Azerbaijan's independence.

General-Lieutenant of the Russian Imperial Army and Deputy Minister of Defense of the Azerbaijani Democratic Republic, Aliagha Shikhlinski, also wrote about Abdulhamid Gaytabashi in his memoirs.

== See also ==
- Azerbaijani Army
- Ministers of Defense of Azerbaijan Republic
