= Vahid Aliyev =

Vahid Aliyev Vahid Əliyev

Deputy Head of the Presidential Administration of Azerbaijan
- In office November 30, 2012 – June 1, 2017
- Preceded by: office established
- Succeeded by: office abolished

Defense Assistant to the President of Azerbaijan
- In office April 12, 2002 – June 1, 2017

Minister of National Security of Nakhchivan Autonomous Republic
- In office 1997–2002

Personal details
- Born: April 19, 1969 (age 56) Baku, Azerbaijan SSR, USSR

Military service
- Rank: lieutenant general
- Awards

Vahid Ali oghlu Aliyev (Azerbaijani: Vahid Əli oğlu Əliyev, born April 19, 1969) is an Azerbaijani lieutenant general, Defense Assistant to the President of Azerbaijan (2002–2017), and Deputy Head of the Presidential Administration of Azerbaijan (2012–2017).

== Biography ==
Vahid Aliyev was born on April 19, 1969, in Baku. In 1983–1986, he studied at Jamshid Nakhchivanski Military Lyceum, then graduated from the Leningrad Higher Military-Political School of Air Defense named after Yuri Andropov and the Faculty of Law of Azerbaijan State University.

In 1990–1991, he served in the Special Purpose Intelligence Regiment of the USSR Armed Forces, in 1991–1996, he worked as the Commissioner of Operations in the Special Department under the President of Azerbaijan, the head of the department; and from March to November 1996, he worked as the head of the Special Department in the Nakhchivan Autonomous Republic, in 1996–1997, he worked as the Deputy Minister of National Security of the Nakhchivan Autonomous Republic, and in 1997–2002, he worked as the Minister of National Security of the Nakhchivan Autonomous Republic.

By the Decree of the President of Azerbaijan Heydar Aliyev dated April 12, 2002, he was appointed Assistant to the President of Azerbaijan, and by the Decree of the President of Azerbaijan dated November 30, 2012, he was appointed the Deputy Head of the Administration of the President of Azerbaijan.

== Awards and decorations ==
- For Service to the Fatherland Order (1st degree)—April 18, 2019
