= Mammadrafi Mammadov =

Azerbaijani politician

- Məmmədrəfi Məmmədov

Minister of Defense
- In office 2 September 1993 – 6 February 1995
- President: Heydar Aliyev
- Preceded by: Vahid Musayev (acting)
- Succeeded by: Safar Abiyev

Personal details
- Born: February 4, 1942 (age 84) Guba, Azerbaijan SSR, Soviet Union

Military service
- Branch/service: Soviet Army; Azerbaijani Land Forces
- Years of service: 1963 – 1995
- Rank: Lieutenant General
- Battles/wars: Soviet–Afghan War; First Nagorno-Karabakh War

Mammadrafi Ismayil oghlu Mammadov (Azerbaijani: Məmmədrəfi İsmayıl oğlu Məmmədov) was Minister of Defense of Azerbaijan from September 2, 1993, until February 6, 1995. Mammadov served as minister during the period of fierce fighting on the Karabakh front.

== Early life and career ==
He was born in the city of Guba. After graduating from high school in 1959, he entered the Guba Agricultural College. In November 1963 he was drafted into the ranks of the Soviet Army, and served in an artillery regiment in Brest (Belarusian SSR). In 1967, he graduated from the Tambov Artillery and Technical School and in the rank of lieutenant was sent for further service in the Group of Soviet Forces in Germany. In 1973, Senior Lieutenant Mamedov entered the Military Academy of Logistics and Transport. After graduating from the academy he served with the rank of major in the Ukrainian Soviet Socialist Republic. In 1979, he was promoted to the rank of lieutenant colonel. He was appointed deputy division commander. From 1982 to 1983, he served in Central Asia as deputy corps commander. In 1983, he was sent by the command to Afghanistan and on October 19 of the same year he was appointed advisor to the commander of one of the corps of the Afghan National Army of the Democratic Republic of Afghanistan. In January 1986, he was sent to a new duty station in Leningrad and in January 1989 he was appointed Deputy Chief of the General Staff Academy. On 1 November 1989, Mammadov was awarded the rank of Major General.

== Term in office ==
=== Invitation and appointment ===
Lieutenant General Mammadov was deputy chief commander of Leningrad Military District before he was invited to lead the Ministry of Defense in Azerbaijan. On September 2, 1993, acting President Heydar Aliyev appointed Mammadov the Minister of Defense of Azerbaijan.

=== Reforms ===
2 November 1993 is considered as the beginning of reforms in the army. Since that time, structural changes, personnel cleansing, planning of military operations under a single command, scientific management of military units, removal of the army from political issues and other work began. Some settlements of Aghdam and Fizuli regions were liberated in a short time. He was appointed to the post at powerful colonel Suret Huseynov's request when Aliyev assumed power in June 1993, mainly because of his close ties to Russian military officials, including the Russian Defense Minister, Pavel Grachev, in the hope that closer military ties with Russia would benefit Azerbaijan. However, the connections yielded the opposite. During his official visit to Russia in 1994, Mammadrafi Mammadov agreed to station two regiments of Russian armed forces in Azerbaijan which was announced by Grachev during the joint press conference. Since the motion was not previously communicated to and approved by President Aliyev, the claims were immediately refuted by outraged Aliyev himself. Within the next few months, Grachev as well as Anatoly Kornukov travelled to Azerbaijan to persuade Azerbaijani authorities to allow Russian military presence in Azerbaijan but were denied the requests.

However, Mammadov is also credited for notifying Baku authorities of acts of sabotage in Azerbaijan. While working in Moscow, Mammadrafi Mammadov passed confidential information about planned helicopter attack of Russian forces on the dissolved Soviet military base in Ganja which was to transfer considerable amount of ammunition and equipment to Azerbaijan as per agreement between Russian and Azerbaijani authorities. The warehouses were immediately emptied and equipment was saved.

=== Karabakh conflict ===
Throughout Mammadov's term in office, most of Azerbaijani territories were not recaptured and remained under Armenian military control. Mammadov was one of the co-signers of Bishkek ceasefire agreement. After the war, he also tried to arrange a 3,500 German peacekeeping force on Karabakh frontlines under auspices of the Organization for Security and Co-operation in Europe.

=== Retirement ===
On February 6, 1995, Aliyev removed Mammadov from his post, replacing him with Colonel General Safar Abiyev.

== See also ==
- Azerbaijani Army
- Ministers of Defense of Azerbaijan Republic
- Safar Abiyev
