= Rahim Gaziyev =

Azerbaijani politician and political prisoner (born 1943)

- Rəhim Qazıyev
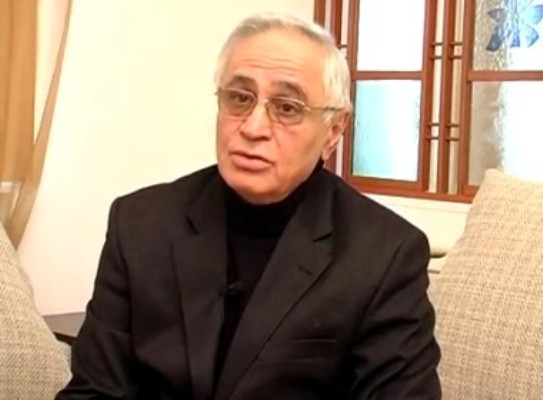
- Gaziyev in 2017

Minister of Defense of Azerbaijan
- In office March 17, 1992 – February 20, 1993
- Prime Minister: Hasan Hasanov; Firuz Mustafayev (acting); Rahim Huseynov; Ali Masimov
- Preceded by: Tahir Aliyev
- Succeeded by: Dadash Rzayev

Personal details
- Born: February 17, 1943 (age 83) Shaki, Azerbaijan SSR, Soviet Union

Rahim Hasan oghlu Gaziyev (Azerbaijani: Rəhim Həsən oğlu Qazıyev; born 1943) was Azerbaijani Defense Minister in 1992–1993, in the turmoil of the First Nagorno-Karabakh War, and later a political prisoner.

== Prior to the war ==
Gaziyev graduated from the Azerbaijan Architecture and Construction University and has a Candidate of Sciences degree in Physics and Mathematics. From 1968 to 1990, he worked as an associate professor of mathematics at the same institution. In 1988, he became one of the founders and first fifteen members of the sovereigntist Popular Front of Azerbaijan. He was known for his radical nationalist viewpoints and vehement support of Abulfaz Elchibey. Gaziyev was arrested in the summer of 1990 as an organizer of the anti-Soviet riots leading to the Black January massacre and was incarcerated in the Lefortovo prison in Moscow. He was freed upon being elected to the Supreme Soviet of Azerbaijan later that summer, although his criminal case was never closed. With the escalation of the Armenian-Azerbaijani military conflict in Nagorno-Karabakh and Shusha becoming one of the few remaining Azerbaijani strongholds in the region, Gaziyev took command of the city's defense in January 1992.

== Office ==
After the resignation of President Ayaz Mutallibov on 6 March 1992, no official body regulated Gaziyev's actions, which provoked him to break ceasefire on a number of occasions including artillery bombardment of Nagorno-Karabakh's capital city Stepanakert. On 17 March 1992, Acting President of Azerbaijan Yagub Mammadov appointed Gaziyev (who had no professional military training) Defence Minister. Two months later, with various political groups chaotically struggling for power, both Shusha and Lachin (city in Azerbaijan-proper linking Nagorno-Karabakh to Armenia) lacked any serious or unified defence and quickly fell to the Armenians. In response, Gaziyev ordered troops to move to the north of the province. Mardakert was taken back in June 1992, and by August, Azerbaijani troops were already at Vank, 12 kilometers north of the province capital Stepanakert. Contrary to his radical anti-Russian sentiment in the late 1980s, Gaziyev was now convinced in the necessity of partnership with Russia. In November, the Azerbaijanis were dislodged from most of Mardakert. After Armenians started advancing into Kalbajar, the Popular Front, which had been in power since June 1992, issued a statement in which it blamed Rahim Gaziyev and Elchibey's official representative in Nagorno-Karabakh Surat Huseynov for treason and intentional surrender of Shusha in an attempt to restore Mutallibov as president and indulge Russia's geopolitical interests. Gaziyev was forced to resign in February 1993.

After Heydar Aliyev came to power in June 1993, Gaziyev was elected to the National Assembly and was offered the position of Vice Premier for Defence Industry. However knowing that Azerbaijan at the time did not produce any defence materials which made the office of no significance (the industry was only established in 2005; see: Azerbaijan Defense Industry), infuriated Gaziyev verbally attacked Aliyev during a parliament session calling him a liar. In an early 1996 interview, Gaziyev claimed having had a mutual agreement with Aliyev by which Gaziyev was to be appointed Deputy Prime Minister of Azerbaijan upon Aliyev's rise to power but was wronged for the sake of the latter's regionalist policies favouring natives of Nakhchivan.

== Conviction and later pardon ==
Now confronting Aliyev's powerful figure, Gaziyev was officially convicted of treason in surrendering Shusha to Armenians. He was detained in jail in August 1993 and was to be tried in court in November but managed to escape to Moscow, followed by Surat Huseynov. There he declared his full support of ex-President Ayaz Mutallibov who had been living in exile in Russia since the summer of 1992 and, ironically, whom Gaziyev helped to have removed from power just two years earlier. On 16 April 1996, Prosecutor General's Office of Russia decided that Gaziyev (already sentenced to death in absentia in his home country) be deported to Baku where his sentence was replaced by life imprisonment in 1998.

At the insistence of PACE, Rahim Gaziyev was pardoned and released in March 2005. After his release, Gaziyev published several articles in an attempt to rehabilitate himself in the public eye but was taken no interest in.

== 2020 arrest ==
On 13 July 2020, State Security Service and the Prosecutor General's Office released a joint statement, accusing Gaziyev of deliberately spreading "untrue information about the nature of the events (See July 2020 Armenian–Azerbaijani clashes) on social network platforms", acting "to weaken the defense capabilities", and incite "riots and violent seizure of state power". Gaziyev was detained as a suspect in a criminal case under Articles 281 and 282 of the criminal code. Gaziyev's daughter Sevinj Jamilova responded to these allegations by saying that "these criminal codes have nothing to do with my father". He was later released and placed under house arrest.
