= Tajaddin Mehdiyev =

Azerbaijani general and politician

- Tacəddin Mehdiyev

Minister of Defense of Azerbaijan
- In office December 11, 1991 – February 17, 1992
- President: Ayaz Mutalibov
- Preceded by: Valeh Barshadly
- Succeeded by: Shahin Musayev (acting)

Personal details
- Born: c. 1946 Shamkir, Azerbaijan SSR, USSR

Military service
- Branch/service: Azerbaijani Armed Forces
- Rank: Major General

Tajaddin Mehdiyev (Azerbaijani: Tacəddin Mehdiyev; born 1946) is an Azerbaijani military leader and politician. He was the Minister of Defense of Azerbaijan and is the Chairman of Committee for Protection of Rights of Officers in Azerbaijan.

== Military career ==
He graduated from the Baku Higher Combined Arms Command School of the Soviet Army in 1967. He was in the same graduating class as future Armenian defence minister Mikael Harutyunyan.

=== Minister of Defense of Azerbaijan ===
Mehdiyev was appointed Minister of Defense of Azerbaijan in December 1991, during the Nagorno-Karabakh conflict, replacing General Valeh Barshadly. In an interview with British journalist Thomas de Waal, Mehdiyev said:

There was not a single piece of military equipment... There was no communications equipment at all. Now we have mobile phones. Then there was absolutely nothing. It was impossible to conduct a conversation with anyone. Everything was listened to. At that time all the government lines went through the GRU [Russian Military Intelligence] and they listened to all our conversations. And there was no other lines. There were no barracks, no training grounds, no weapons, no equipment.

While in office, he personally led an unsuccessful operation in Dashalty where many Azeri soldiers were ambushed and killed. Additionally, within the 2 months of his term in office, several villages of strategic importance, Karkijahan, Malibeyli and Gushchular, and Garadaghly and were lost to Armenian forces. On February 17, 1992 with the fall of Garadaghly village of Khojavend Rayon where more than 70 Azerbaijani civilians died and shortly before the fall of Khojaly, Mehdiyev was officially removed from the post of Minister of Defense. The ministry was then headed briefly by Chief of Staff, Shahin Musayev before Tahir Aliyev took over.

== Later years ==
In 2005, Mehdiyev ran for Azerbaijani parliament from the election district No. 99 of Shamkir Rayon of Azerbaijan but did not get elected. Mehdiyev has been a proponent of big reforms in the way post-career officers are treated while he was the Chairman of Committee for Protection of Rights of Officers. He lobbied changes in salary, health insurance, provision of jobs to members of officers' families due to their relocations and social protection. He was also one of supporters for establishment of Ministry of Defence Industry of Azerbaijan and starting domestic military production. In the last few years, Tajeddin Mehdiyev worked at the Ministry of Defense but was laid off along with other 30 high-ranking officers in 2009 due to ongoing reforms in the ministry.

== See also ==
- Azerbaijani Army
- Ministers of Defense of Azerbaijan Republic
