= Sarov, Goranboy =

Sarov is a village and municipality in the Goranboy Rayon of Azerbaijan. It has a population of 854.

== Notable natives ==
- Anvar Farajov — National Hero of Azerbaijan.
