= Valeh Barshadly =

Azerbaijani general (1927–1999)

- Valeh Bərşadlı

1st Minister of Defense of Azerbaijan
- In office September 5, 1991 – December 11, 1991
- President: Ayaz Mutalibov; Abulfaz Elchibey
- Preceded by: office established
- Succeeded by: Tajeddin Mehdiyev

Chief of General Staff of Azerbaijani Armed Forces
- In office December 11, 1991 – September 4, 1992
- Preceded by: Colonel Rufat Amirov (acting)
- Succeeded by: Colonel General Safar Abiyev (acting)

Personal details
- Born: July 6, 1927 Eyvazly, Zangezur uezd, Azerbaijan SSR, USSR
- Died: May 15, 1999 (aged 71) Baku, Azerbaijan

Military service
- Branch/service: Azerbaijani Armed Forces
- Rank: Lieutenant General

Valeh Eyyub oghlu Barshadly (Azerbaijani: Valeh Eyyub oğlu Bərşadlı; July 6, 1927 – May 15, 1999) also spelled as Valeh Barshadly, was the first Minister of Defense of Azerbaijan after restoration of its independence in 1991.

== Early life ==
Barshadly was born on July 6, 1927, in Gubadly, Azerbaijan SSR. Throughout his early years, he completed a military school, Military Academy of Tank Forces of USSR, Military Academy of General Staff of Soviet Armed Forces and was the youngest officer of Azerbaijani nationality to receive the rank of a General.

== Career in the military ==
=== Soviet Azerbaijan ===
In the 1970s, Barshadly was Deputy Commander of the 3rd Shock Army stationed in East Germany. While the First Secretary of Azerbaijan SSR, Heydar Aliyev invited Valeh Barshadly from Germany to lead the Nakhchivanski Military Lyceum and the naval school in Zikh, just outside Baku, to increase the number of professional Azeri officers. The number of Azeri officers were to grow by 50%.

=== Azerbaijan Republic ===
Barshadly has played a significant role in training Azerbaijani officers during Soviet rule and in re-establishing an Azerbaijani Army. The decree to establish the Ministry of Defense of Azerbaijan was signed on September 5, 1991. Barshadly who was a well experienced general was to lead the ministry. During first few days, the Ministry consisted of 4 people: General Valeh Barshadly, General Arif Salahov, Colonel Telman Mehdiyev and General Zaur Rzayev. On October 9, 1991, the Supreme Soviet of Azerbaijan SSR passed a bill about "Establishment of self-defense forces" to speed up the process. The first unit of the new army was formed on the basis of the 18-110 military unit of mechanized infantry of the 4th Army located in Shikhovo, south of Baku. When the ministry was being formed, every officer had only one pistol. In general, Barshadly was in favor of creating a professional army on the basis of contractual relationship between the army and servicemen. He proposed to create 16,000 men brigades with numbering of and assigning a flag to each tabor. In addition, he favored creation of additional raid tabors. However, his offer was rejected by the parliament and it was decided to create the army on basis of conscription. First two brigades were established on conscripted and volunteered servicemen.

Realizing the access to international community was important, in November 1991, Barshadly made attempts to establish press service of the ministry for timely communications with the press and appointed Ramiz Melikov to lead the department. During times of disorganization, Barshadly was also proponent of creation of partisan groups to fight the enemy but never succeeded in doing so.

On December 11, 1991, Barshadly was replaced by Tajeddin Mehdiyev, and appointed the Deputy Minister of Defense and Chief of General Staff of Azerbaijani Armed Forces. During his term as Chief of Staff, Azerbaijani army has achieved successful military victories on the Karabakh front. He also prevented the ammunition from being destroyed when the remaining Soviet army was pulling out of Azerbaijan in 1992. On September 4, 1992, Barshadly was relieved from his duties as Deputy Minister and Chief of the General Staff by a presidential decree of Abulfaz Elchibey. Some allege he resigned himself, under pressure from the Popular Front of Azerbaijan. In later years he worked as the rector of the Jamshid Nakhichevanski Military Lyceum and was again appointed the deputy Minister of Defense and Chief of Staff under Heydar Aliyev but then he resigned and return to the lyceum where he worked until end of his life.

== Death ==
Barshadly died on May 15, 1999. He was buried with honors on May 18, 1999, at the Avenue of the Honored Ones Cemetery.

On July 6, 2007, Azerbaijani government held the 80th anniversary of Valeh Barshadly.

== See also ==
- Azerbaijani Army
- Ministers of Defense of Azerbaijan Republic
