= Sarovlu =

- Location within Azerbaijan
- Coordinates: 40°43′42″N 46°35′25″E
- Country: Azerbaijan
- Rayon: Goranboy
- Municipality: Dəliməmmədli

Population
  - Total: 356
- Time zone: UTC+4 (AZT)
  - Summer (DST): UTC+5 (AZT)

Sarovlu (also, Sarov and Saroylu) is a village in the Goranboy Rayon of Azerbaijan. The village forms part of the municipality of Dəliməmmədli.
