= General Staff of Azerbaijani Armed Forces =

General Staff of the Armed Forces of Azerbaijan Republic
- Azərbaycan Respublikası Silahlı Qüvvələri Baş Qərargahı

Agency overview
- Formed: October 9, 1991
- Jurisdiction: Azerbaijani Armed Forces
- Headquarters: Baku, Azerbaijan Republic
- Agency executive: Karim Valiyev, Chief of General Staff of Azerbaijani Armed Forces – First Deputy Minister of Defense

The General Staff of the Armed Forces of Azerbaijan Republic (Azerbaijani: Azərbaycan Respublikası Silahlı Qüvvələri Baş Qərargahı) is the military staff of the Azerbaijani Armed Forces. It is the central organ of the Armed Forces Administration and oversees operational management of the armed forces under the Ministry of Defense of Azerbaijan Republic. The Chief of the General Staff is appointed by the President of Azerbaijan, who is the supreme commander-in-chief of the armed forces.

== History ==
It was founded as the Ümumi qərargah by the order of Samad bey Mehmandarov on 15 November 1918. Then, Colonel Habib Bey Salimov, Chief of Staff of the 424th Corps of Azerbaijan, was appointed Chief of the General Staff. The headquarters consisted of equipment, fortification, general on duty, general quartermaster, artillery, medicine, military education and control departments. By the end of the month, the General Staff moved to Ganja and continued its activities there. By the order of the Minister of War dated on New Year's Eve, the General Artillery Department was established on the basis of the artillery department, and this structure was removed from the General Staff and subordinated directly to the Minister of Defense. In March 1919, by order of the Minister of War, Erkani-Harb (General Staff) was created. In this connection, the quartermaster general and topographic departments were taken from the General Staff and given to the Armed Forces.

In 2008, a new structure of the General Staff was determined, accelerating NATO integration. It gained powers previously held by the MoD, turning the General Staff into a semi-independent structure. According to the corresponding report, the Inspection Department of the Ministry, as well as the Military Commissariat were re-subordinated to the General Staff. The existing Organizational Mobilization Department of the General Staff was abolished and merged with the Military Commissariat. A Land Forces Command was also created in accordance with the Turkish model. According to the Defense Ministry's press service, a meeting of the Azerbaijani Defense Ministry's working group with experts of the Allied Command Transformation was held in Baku to discuss the separation of the General Staff structure from the Ministry of Defense.

The General Staff itself was then divided into six main departments:

- General Directorate of Personnel Management
- General Intelligence Agency
- General Operations and Combat Training Department
- Support Forces Command
- General Directorate of Defense Planning
- General Directorate of Communications and Information Systems

On 26 July 2014, a groundbreaking ceremony for a new and modern office building for the General Staff Headquarter was held at the Ministry of Defense, attended by Defense Minister Colonel-General Zakir Hasanov.

== Members of the General Staff ==
- Chief of the General Staff (head) - Karim Valiyev
- Deputy Chief of the General Staff and Chief of the Main Operational Department
- Deputy Chief of the General Staff and Chief of the Department of Ideological Work and Moral and Psychological Support
- National Advisor on Military Issues to the President of Azerbaijan - Lieutenant General Vahid Aliyev (2012-2017)
- Commander of the Azerbaijani Land Forces - Colonel General Hikmat Mirzayev
- Commander of the Azerbaijani Navy - Captain 1st Rank Shahin Mammadov
- Commander of the Azerbaijani Air Force - Lieutenant General Namig Islamzadeh

== List of Chiefs of the General Staff ==
=== Azerbaijan Democratic Republic (1918−1920) ===
No.	Portrait	Chief of the General Staff	Took office	Left office	Time in office	Ref.
1	Habib Bey Salimov	Major general Habib Bey Salimov (1881–1920)	1 August 1918	26 March 1919	237 days	–
2	Maciej Sulkiewicz	Major general Maciej Sulkiewicz (1865–1920)	26 March 1919	10 December 1919	259 days	–
3	Abdulhamid Bey Gaytabashi	Major general Abdulhamid Bey Gaytabashi (1848–1920)	10 December 1919	28 April 1920	140 days	

For period from 1920 to 1992, see Chief of the General Staff of the Soviet Union.

=== Azerbaijan Republic (1991−present) ===
No.	Portrait	Chief of the General Staff	Took office	Left office	Time in office	Ref.
1	Shahin Musayev	Major general Shahin Musayev	22 January 1992	May 1992	3 months	
–	Rufat Amirov	Colonel; Rufat Amirov; Acting	May 1992	May 1992	0 months	–
2	Valeh Barshadly	Lieutenant general Valeh Barshadly (1927–1999)	May 1992	4 September 1992	4 months	
3	Nuraddin Sadigov	Lieutenant general Nuraddin Sadigov (1935–2009)	4 September 1992	17 June 1993	286 days	
–	Safar Abiyev	Colonel general Safar Abiyev (born 1950); Acting	17 June 1993	2 November 1993	138 days	
4	Najmaddin Sadigov	Colonel general Najmaddin Sadigov (born 1956)	2 November 1993	28 January 2021	27 years, 87 days	
5	Karim Valiyev	Colonel general Karim Valiyev (born 1961)	23 July 2021	Incumbent	5 years, 16 days	

== See also ==
- Military history of Azerbaijan
- Azerbaijani Navy
- Azerbaijani Air Forces
