= Vahid Musayev =

Azerbaijani deputy Minister of Defense

Acting Minister of Defense of Azerbaijan
- In office August 1993 – 25 August 1993
- President: Heydar Aliyev (acting)
- Preceded by: Safar Abiyev (acting)
- Succeeded by: Mammadrafi Mammadov

Personal details
- Born: 15 November 1947 Baku, Azerbaijan SSR, Soviet Union
- Died: 8 January 1999 (aged 51) Gobustan, Garadagh raion, Baku, Azerbaijan

Military service
- Branch/service: Azerbaijani Armed Forces
- Rank: Major General

Vahid Abdulla oghlu Musayev (Azerbaijani: Vahid Abdulla oğlu Musayev) (died 8 January 1999) was the deputy Minister of Defense of Azerbaijan and Acting Minister within the month of August 1993.

== Life ==
Musayev was born on 15 November 1947 in Baku. In 1955, he went to secondary school No. 176, and in 1966 he graduated from that school with honors from Baku State University. In 1971, he began military service in Georgia as an officer. He studied at a Soviet military academy in Leningrad from 1978 to 1981, and after graduating based himself out of Akhalkalaki. From 1984 to 1986, he served overseas in Maputo, Mozambique Upon returning in 1986, he based himself in Zhytomyr and then Volodymyr-Volyns'kyi, both in Ukraine. In 1990, he was elected a deputy from the latter region.

== Political career ==
Musayev was Deputy Minister of Defense and was assigned by the Speaker of the National Assembly of Azerbaijan and acting President Heydar Aliyev to lead the ministry until the new minister was appointed. Due to numerous mistakes during the operation to stabilize the situation in southern Azerbaijani regions of Lankoran, Astara, Masalli, Lerik, Yardimli, Jalilabad and Bilasuvar raions in August 1993 which led to civilian injuries, he was first demoted from the rank of Major General and then sacked as Deputy Minister of Defense on 25 August 1993.

== Generals' plot ==
Vahid Musayev is well known as one of the masterminds of the so-called Generals' Plot to overthrow the government of President Heydar Aliyev. General Vahid Musayev, general Rafig Agayev, general Shahin Musayev, Murad Sadaddinov and Faig Bakhishaliyev (former members of Special Purpose Police Unit (OPON)) and a few other colonels were arrested in August 1995 on charges of organizing coup d'état by planning to shoot the presidential airplane down in a premeditated rocket attack in May 1995. Vahid Musayev was sentenced to 15 years and jailed at Gobustan correctional institution.

== Revolt ==
On the night of 7–8 January 1999 Vahid Musayev, along with Faig Bakhishaliyev and imprisoned members of OPON, organized a prison revolt managing to capture weapons, and taking other prisoners and guards hostage. The standoff between government forces and the rebels continued until late hours of 8 January as the rebels held 28 prison guards hostage. As a result, rebels including Vahid Musayev and several other main organizers were killed during the shootout between the rebels and Azerbaijani special anti-terror forces detachments, after all negotiations failed. Two servicemen were killed and twenty five were injured.

== See also ==
- Azerbaijani Army
- Ministers of Defense of Azerbaijan Republic
