= Safar Abiyev =

Azerbaijani military officer

- Səfər Əbiyev
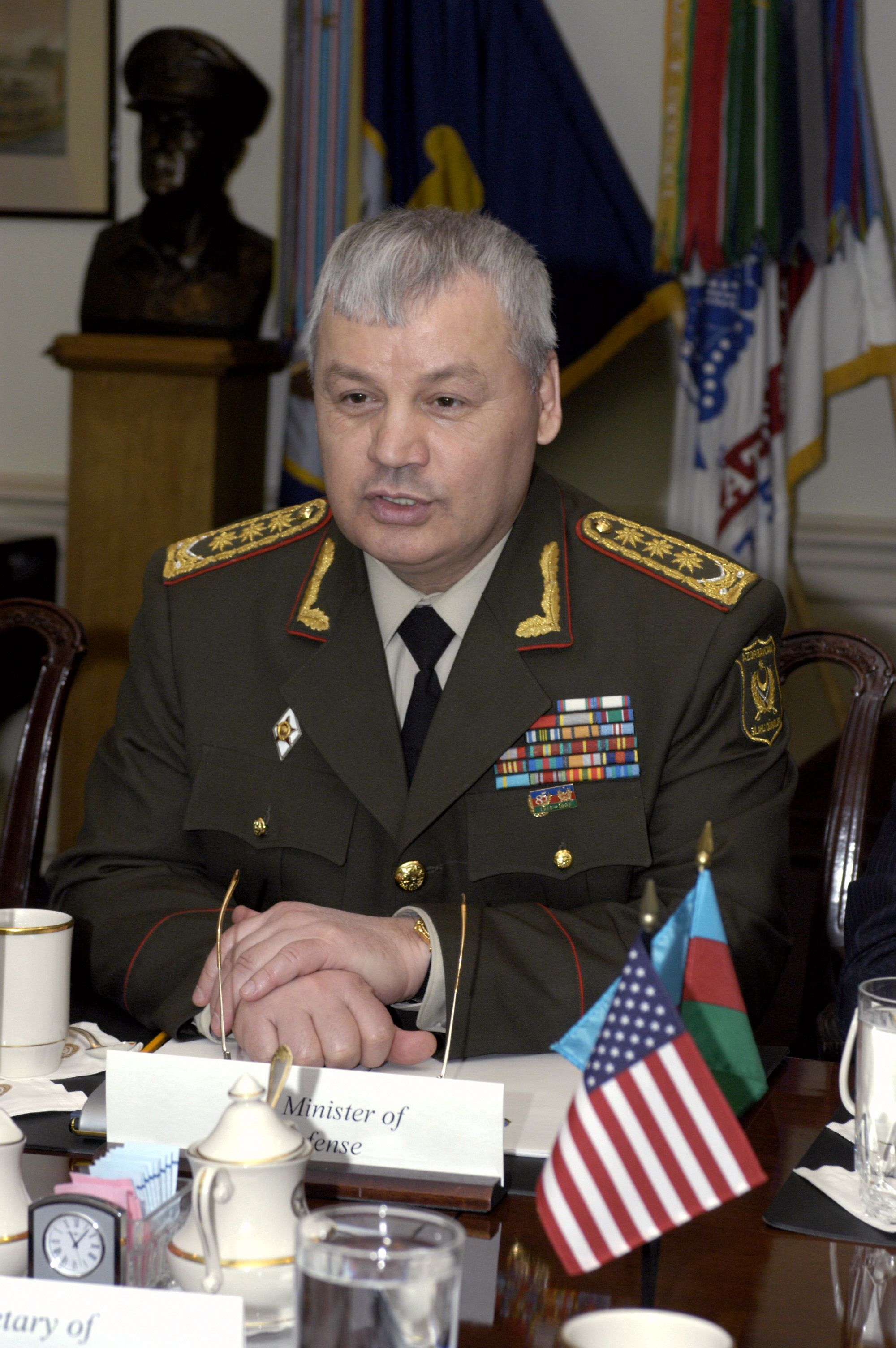
- Abiyev in 2004

Minister of Defense
- In office 6 February 1995 – 28 October 2013
- President: Heydar Aliyev; Ilham Aliyev
- Preceded by: Mammadrafi Mammadov
- Succeeded by: Zakir Hasanov
- In office 17 June 1993 – 20 August 1993; Acting
- Preceded by: Dadash Rzayev
- Succeeded by: Vahid Musayev Acting

Chief of General Staff of Azerbaijani Armed Forces
- In office 17 June 1993 – 2 November 1993; Acting
- President: Abulfaz Elchibey
- Preceded by: Nuraddin Sadigov
- Succeeded by: Najmaddin Sadigov

Personal details
- Born: 27 January 1950 (age 76) Baku, Azerbaijan SSR, USSR

Military service
- Branch/service: Soviet Army; Azerbaijani Armed Forces
- Years of service: 1968–1991; 1995–2013
- Rank: Colonel General

Colonel General Safar Akhundbala oghlu Abiyev (Azerbaijani: Səfər Axundbala oğlu Əbiyev; born 27 January 1950) is an Azerbaijani politician that held the position of Minister of Defense of Azerbaijan from 1995 to 2013. He was considered one of the longest serving defense ministers in the Commonwealth of Independent States.

== Early life and career ==
General Safar Abiyev was born in Baku. He is an ethnic Lezgin. He graduated in 1971 from Baku's Higher Military College, and in 1982 from the Command Faculty of the Frunze Military Academy in Moscow, and has spent his entire professional life in the armed forces. Abiyev was appointed Chief of General Staff of Azerbaijani Armed Forces and acting Minister of Defense when Minister Dadash Rzayev was relieved of his duties on 17 June 1993. He worked as acting Minister until August 1993 when Deputy Minister Vahid Musayev was assigned to lead the ministry but was soon sacked by Heydar Aliyev on 25 August 1993. Abiyev continued to serve as the Chief of General Staff until 2 November 1993, when the post was taken by Najmaddin Sadigov. Abiyev was reinstated as Minister of Defense of Azerbaijan on 6 February 1995, replacing Mammadrafi Mammadov.

== Defence minister ==
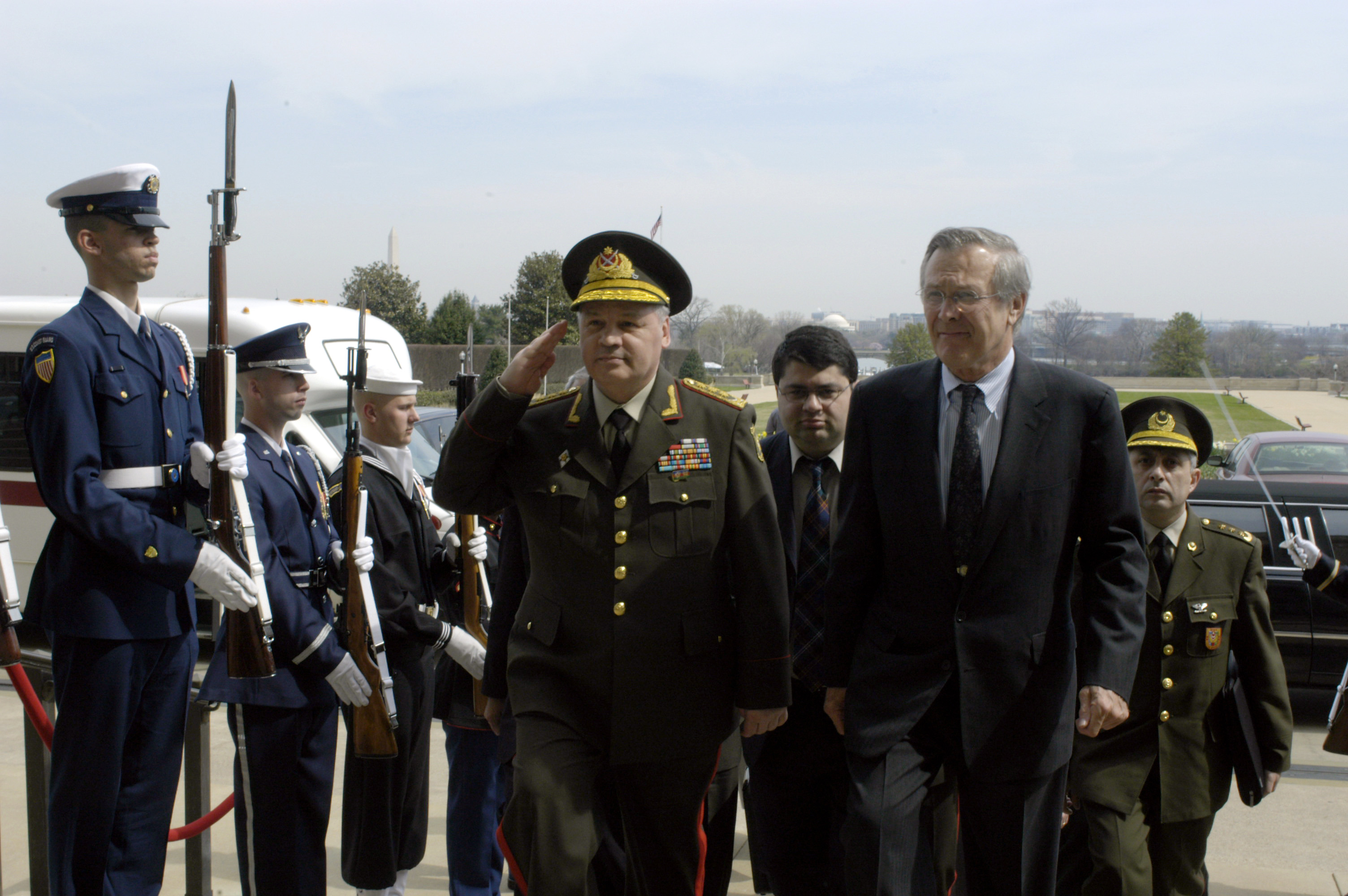
Defence Minister Safar Abiyev with U.S. Secretary of Defense Donald Rumsfeld during a visit to The Pentagon on 26 March 2004.

Abiyev was part of the State Commission for the funeral of Heydar Aliyev. Upon the pardon of Ramil Safarov, Abiyev promoted Safarov to the rank of major, provided him with an apartment and over eight years of back pay. He commanded the first parade in 16 years in 2008 to honor the 90th anniversary of the Azerbaijani Armed Forces. He went on to command two subsequent parades on Azadliq Square.

=== Foreign relations ===
Under his orders, the Training and Education Center of the Armed Forces was established in accordance with the protocol which was signed between Azerbaijan and the Turkish Armed Forces in 2000. In November 2011, when the United States Secretary of the Navy Ray Mabus met President Aliyev, Abiyev was also present. Mabus later announced that the military ties between their countries would expand. In 2012, Abiyev, during a meeting in Tehran with Iranian Defense Minister Ahmad Vahidi, declared that "No threat will be made against Iran from Azerbaijan's territory and we will not help the enemies of the Islamic Republic of Iran under any circumstances." According to materials published by Wikileaks in December 2010, Abiyev claimed that in January 2009 during his visit to Moscow, the Russian defence minister Anatoliy Serdyukov had unofficially admitted to Russian weapon transfers to Armenia, although it officially was denied.

=== Downfall ===
In early 2013, he came under criticism from demonstrators during the Baku protests, after Azerbaijani Army soldier Ceyhun Qubadov was found dead on 7 January. It was first reported that the cause of death was heart attack. However, Qubadov's family asked for an investigation as they believed he was murdered. Hundreds of protesters gathered at the Fountains Square with slogans such as "Stop killing our soldiers" and "You must answer to us." Immediately after the internal investigation, Abiyev was fired by the order of President Ilham Aliyev. Later that year, his successor Zakir Hasanov visited the 2nd Army Corps, which was considered the Abiyev's "fortress". During the visit, he announced changes in the leadership structures, including the promotion of about 50 officers who were neglected during Abiyev's tenure.

== Post-military ==
According to Abiyev's brother-in-law, a resident of the village of Pirvakhid (Quba), Ogtay Mammadov, Abiyev has not been in contact with his relatives for a long time, and they have no information about his whereabouts. This caused speculation about whether he was in exile, with many saying that he and his eldest son Ruslan live in Europe. Later, a military expert revealed that Abiyev resides in Baku and receives a pension of more than 3,000 manats. Abiyev penned an article after the 2020 Nagorno-Karabakh war, where he praised the role of Presidents Aliyev and Recep Tayyip Erdoğan, stating that tensions in relations between Azerbaijan and Russia were not beneficial and that "Armenians are one of the few nations in the world that had neither a real national history, nor a homeland, nor a land.

== Personal life ==
Abiyev has two sons: Ruslan and Roman. His elder son Ruslan Abiyev works in the tax service. His younger son Roman Abiyev is an employee of the prosecutor's office.

== Awards ==
- Shohrat Order (26 January 2010)
- Azerbaijani Flag Order (1995 and 2003)
- "10th Anniversary of the Armed Forces of Azerbaijan (1991–2001)" Medal
- "95th Anniversary of the Armed Forces of Azerbaijan (1918–2013)" Medal
- "For Faultless Service" medal
- Jubilee Medal "50 Years of the Armed Forces of the USSR"
- Medal "For Battle Merit"
- Jubilee Medal "60 Years of the Armed Forces of the USSR"
- Jubilee Medal "70 Years of the Armed Forces of the USSR"
- Medal "For Impeccable Service"
- Medal "5 years of the Armed Forces of the Republic of Tajikistan"

== See also ==
- Azerbaijani Armed Forces
