= Ministry of Defence (Azerbaijan) =

Government ministry of Azerbaijan

Ministry of Defence of Azerbaijan
- Azərbaycan Respublikasının Müdafiə Nazirliyi
- Official emblem of the Azerbaijani Defence Ministry

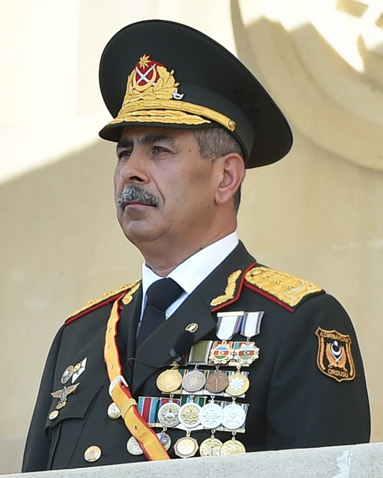
- Zakir Hasanov

Agency overview
- Formed: 5 September 1991; 35 years ago
- Jurisdiction: Government of Azerbaijan
- Headquarters: 3 Parliament Avenue, Baku, 1073
- Minister responsible: Zakir Hasanov, Minister of Defence
- Agency executive: Karim Valiyev, Chief of the General Staff and First Deputy Minister of Defence
- Parent department: Ministry of Defense of the Soviet Union (union wide); Ministry of Defence of the ADR (in Azerbaijan)
- Website: mod.gov.az

The Ministry of Defence of the Republic of Azerbaijan (Azerbaijani: Azərbaycan Respublikasının Müdafiə Nazirliyi) or MN is an Azerbaijani government agency that is associated with the Azerbaijani military. The ministry is responsible for keeping Azerbaijan defended against external threats, preserving its territorial integrity, waging war on behalf of Azerbaijan (for example, Azerbaijan's contribution to the war on terror), and the surveillance of the Azerbaijani sector of the Caspian Sea sea and airspace. The Minister of Defence is appointed and removed from the post by the Commander-in-chief of the Azerbaijani Armed Forces, the President of Azerbaijan.

The ministry building is located in Baku, at 3 Parliament Avenue.

== History ==
The first defence minister of the Azerbaijan Democratic Republic was General Khosrov bey Sultanov, who was appointed on 28 May 1918. In accordance with the Action Plan approved by Parliament on formation of the army, important structures and divisions were to be established by 1 November 1919. Within the time allotted, an artillery division, and two infantry divisions consisting of three regiments, a special telegraph, cavalry and machine gun platoons, railway battalions were to be created. Another priority of the government of the Azerbaijan Democratic Republic was to establish the Ministry of Defence. No minister of defence portfolio was officially instituted but Khosrov bey Sultanov assumed the duties of the minister from 28 May 28 through to 11 June 11, 1918. The Ministry of Defence of the Azerbaijan Democratic Republic was established by a decision made on 23 October 1918. This decision was formalized on 7 November 7 of the same year. After formalization of the decision Fatali-khan Khoyski was appointed the minister of defence. On 26 December 1918 Lieutenant General of the Russian Artillery Samad-bey Mehmandarov took office. Lieutenant General Aliagha Shikhlinski was appointed his deputy and Lieutenant General Suleyman Shulkevitch as the Chief of the General Staff. As the Ministry of Defence was officially dissolved in the wake of Azerbaijan's Sovietization in 1920, their functions were delegated to the People's Military Commissariat, and the Bolsheviks executed 15 of the 21 Army Generals of Azerbaijan. The newly-formed Azerbaijani Red Army replaced the previous army during the Russian Civil War.

In the midst of the dissolution of the Soviet Union and political turmoil in Azerbaijan in the late 1980s, the Azerbaijani military played an important role in the struggle for and retention of power.

The Ministry of Defence was established on 5 September 1991, following a resolution by the High Council of the Azerbaijan SSR. One month later, on 9 October, the Armed Forces of Azerbaijan was established.

== Leadership ==
- Minister of Defence: Colonel General Zakir Hasanov
- First Deputy Minister of Defence – Chief of General Staff of the Azerbaijan Army: Colonel General Karim Valiyev
- Deputy Minister of Defence – Commander of the Land Forces: Colonel General Hikmat Mirzayev
- Deputy Minister of Defence – Commander of the Air Force: Lieutenant General Namig Islamzade
- Deputy Minister of Defense – Director General: Agil Gurbanov

== Structure ==
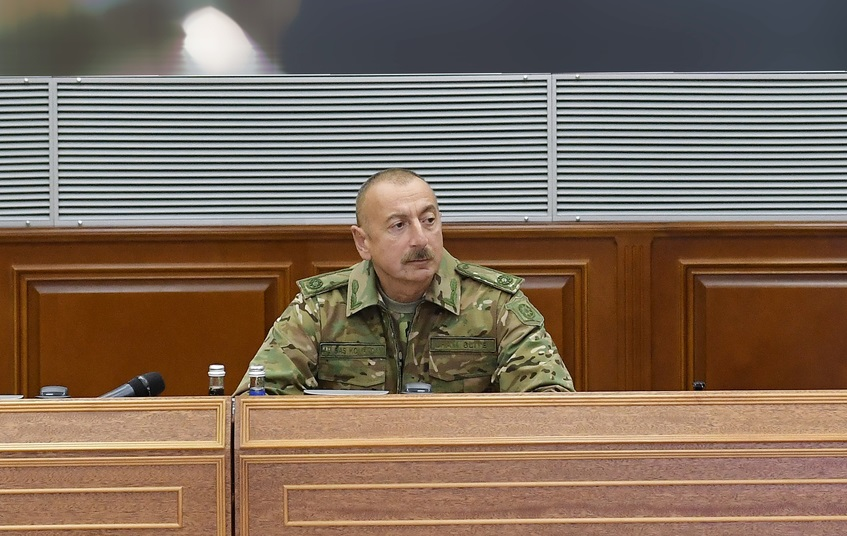
President Ilham Aliyev in military uniform at the Central Command Post of the Ministry of Defence during an operational meeting.

The ministry has the following structure:

- Central Command Post
- Main Department of Personnel
  - Office for Women and Families of Servicemen
  - Military Band Service
- Main Department of Logistics
- Main Department of Combat Training and Military Education
- Main Medical Department
- Organization and Mobilization Department
- Department of Staff
- Department for Ideological Work and Moral-Psychological Support
- Legal Department
- Department of Finance and Budget
- Department of Affairs
- Department for Municipal Services
- Department for Defence Procurement and Equipment
- Baku Garrison
- Military Police
- Institutions
  - "Azərbaycan Ordusu" newspaper
  - Central Clinical Hospital
  - Research Centre
  - Centre for Documentary and Educational Films of the Azerbaijan Army
  - Military Scientific Centre
  - Centre for War Games of the Armed Forces
  - Army Ideological and Cultural Centre named after Hazi Aslanov
    - Song and Dance Ensemble
  - Ideological and Cultural Centre of the Ganja Garrison
  - Azerbaijan Military History Museum
  - MOIK Baku

=== Educational institutions under the ministry ===
- Military academies
  - War College of the Armed Forces
  - Training and Education Centre of the Armed Forces
  - Azerbaijan Higher Military Academy
    - Azerbaijan Higher Naval Academy (former independent institution)
    - Azerbaijan High Military Aviation School (former independent institution)
- Other educational institutions
  - Secondary Military Medical School of Azerbaijan
  - Military Medical Faculty of Azerbaijan Medical University
- Military lyceums
  - Jamshid Nakhchivanski Military Lyceum
  - Heydar Aliyev Military Lyceum

The military education system of the Ministry of Defence is composed of educational institutions specialized on military and other relevant agencies that mainly focus on training and building a qualified and patriotic staff who are expected to implement the duties and tasks of armed forces and at the same time having adequate knowledge based on education standards of the country for guaranteeing the defence and security of Azerbaijan.

== International military cooperation ==
The main directions of international military cooperation:

- Bilateral and multilateral cooperation with countries in the region and beyond;
- Cooperation with the Euro-Atlantic structures;
- Cooperation with international organizations and defence-industrial complexes of foreign countries;
- Cooperation on military, military-political and military-technical issues to improve military security system;
- Study new programmes and mechanisms
- Broadening the participation in inspection activities set out under the Vienna Document 2011 "On Confidence and Security-Building Measures" and to the Treaty 1990 "On Conventional Armed Forces in Europe" (CFE);
- Expanding the activities related to crisis prevention and armed conflicts management, as well as resolution and elimination of their consequences, with a focus on conflicting efforts to combat international terrorism, the proliferation of nuclear and other weapons of mass destruction, their components and vehicles, modern global challenges and threats arising from military operations;
- Broadening the scope of activities related to the fulfilment of commitments and obligations arising out of the cooperation with international organizations and military organizations of foreign countries in the area of international military cooperation;
- Providing more effective training for military personnel and units, whose participation in peacekeeping operations are planned, the study of international experience and application capabilities to contribute to improvement of the level of combat training and its compatibility.

=== Cooperation with OSCE ===
The Ministry of Defence of the Republic of Azerbaijan supports the Office of the Personal Representative of the OSCE Chairperson-in-Office to conduct a ceasefire monitoring exercises on the Line of Confrontation of the armed forces of Armenia and Azerbaijan as well as on the state border.

=== Cooperation with NATO ===
The Republic of Azerbaijan joined the NATO-led "Partnership for Peace" (PFP) programme on 4 May 1994, and the NATO Planning and Review Process (PARP) in 1996. Azerbaijan joined the NATO military training and education programme aimed at improving the school of sergeants in the Armed Forces of the Republic of Azerbaijan, training programmes for junior officers and the inclusion of the subject "Strategy and Defence Planning" in the educational programme of the Academy of Armed Forces as a new module. Azerbaijan has become a reliable partner in NATO-led operations in Kosovo and Afghanistan, and still contributes to the alliance's mission in Afghanistan by deploying its peacekeeping forces there. Furthermore, on NATO's advice, Azerbaijan developed strategic documents on defence and security, and made improvements in this direction. Besides this, NATO and Azerbaijan cooperate on reorganizing units in accordance with NATO standards and on developing control and command capabilities for each armed service.

=== Cooperation with ICRC ===
Cooperation between the Ministry of Defence of the Republic of Azerbaijan and the International Committee of the Red Cross (ICRC) covers the issues of providing educational materials on International Humanitarian Law (IHL) for the Armed Forces of the Republic of Azerbaijan, delivering lectures on IHL in the Military Academy of the Armed Forces, and conducting training and seminars on IHL for servicemen, ensuring their participation in regional and international courses. Cooperation also helps to monitor the civilian population's living conditions in the areas near the Line of Confrontation (LOC) between the armed forces of Armenia and Azerbaijan, through visits to these places, creating conditions for the agricultural activities of the civilian population living near the Line of Confrontation of the armed forces of the Armenia and Azerbaijan through launching some social orientated projects, alongside cooperation in arranging and conducting humanitarian assistance.

== List of ministers ==
=== ADR ===
№	President		Term of office			Political party	Government	Elected	Ref
№	Portrait	Name	Took office	Left office	Days	Political party	Government	Elected	Ref
1		Khosrov bey Sultanov; Xosrov bəy Sultanov (1879–1947)	27 May 1918	11 June 1918	15	Ittihad	1. Rasulzade I	1918	
1		Khosrov bey Sultanov; Xosrov bəy Sultanov (1879–1947)	Won the Battle of Baku; Established two infantry divisions consisting of three regiments, artillery division, special telegraph, cavalry and machine gun platoons, railway battalions.						
2		Fatali Khan Khoyski; Fətəli-xan Xoyski (1875–1920)	7 November 1918	25 December 1918	48	Independent	2. Topchubashov I	1918	
3		Samad bey Mehmandarov; Səməd bəy Mehmandarov (1855–1931)	25 December 1918	28 April 1920	490	Independent	3. Topchubashov I	1918	
3		Samad bey Mehmandarov; Səməd bəy Mehmandarov (1855–1931)	1920 Ganja revolt; Failed to slow down the advance of 11th Red Army on Azerbaijan Democratic Republic.						

=== Heads of Military Department of Azerbaijan SSR ===
People's Commissars for Military and Naval Affairs of Azerbaijan SSR

№	Chairman		Term of office			Political party	Government	Elected	Ref
№	Portrait	Name	Took office	Left office	Days	Political party	Government	Elected	Ref
1		Chingiz Ildyrym; Çingiz İldırım (1890–1938)	28 April 1920	5 June 1920	38	Communist (Bolsheviks)	1. Hüseynov I	—	
2		Aliheydar Garayev; Aliheydar Garayev (1896–1938)	5 June 1920	20 June 1920	15	Communist (Bolsheviks)	2. Hüseynov I	—	

=== Azerbaijan Republic ===
№	President		Term of office			Political party	Government	Elected	Ref
№	Portrait	Name	Took office	Left office	Days	Political party	Government	Elected	Ref
1		Valeh Barshadly; Valeh Bərşadlı (1927–1999)	5 September 1991	11 December 1991	97	Military	Mütəllibov II	1991	
1		Valeh Barshadly; Valeh Bərşadlı (1927–1999)	During his term as Chief of Staff, Azerbaijani army has achieved successful military victories on the Karabakh front; Prevented the ammunition from being destroyed when the remaining Soviet army was pulling out of Azerbaijan in 1992.						
2		Tajeddin Mehdiyev; Tacəddin Mehdiyev (19??–)	11 December 1991	17 February 1992	68	Military	Mütəllibov II	1971	
2		Tajeddin Mehdiyev; Tacəddin Mehdiyev (19??–)	Led an unsuccessful operation in Dashalty; Capture of Malibeyli and Gushchular.						
–		Shahin Musayev (Acting); Şahin Musayev (19??–)	17 February 1992	24 February 1992	7	Military	–	–	
–		Shahin Musayev (Acting); Şahin Musayev (19??–)	Capture of Garadaghly.						
3		Tahir Aliyev; Tahir Əliyev (1952–)	24 February 1992	16 March 1992	21	Military	–	1992	
3		Tahir Aliyev; Tahir Əliyev (1952–)	Khojaly Massacre.						
4		Rahim Gaziyev; Rəhim Qazıyev (1943–)	17 March 1992	20 February 1993	340	Azerbaijani Popular Front Party	4. Elçibəy I	1992	
4		Rahim Gaziyev; Rəhim Qazıyev (1943–)	Capture of Shusha.						
5		Dadash Rzayev; Dadaş Rzayev (1935–2024)	20 February 1993	17 June 1993	147	Azerbaijani Popular Front Party	5. Elçibəy I	1993	
5		Dadash Rzayev; Dadaş Rzayev (1935–2024)	Sacked by President Abulfaz Elchibey for taking a part during skirmishes during the Ganja revolt.						
–		Safar Abiyev (Acting); Səfər Əbiyev (1950–)	17 June 1993	7 August 1993	51	New Azerbaijan Party	–	–	
–		Vahid Musayev (Acting); Vahid Musayev (1947–1999)	7 August 1993	25 August 1993	18	New Azerbaijan Party	–	–	
–		Vahid Musayev (Acting); Vahid Musayev (1947–1999)	Arresting for being part of coup d'état attempt against Heydar Aliyev.						
6		Mammadrafi Mammadov; Məmmədrəfi Məmmədov (1942–)	2 September 1993	6 February 1995	522	New Azerbaijan Party	6. H.Əliyev II	1993	
6		Mammadrafi Mammadov; Məmmədrəfi Məmmədov (1942–)	Bishkek Protocol.						
7		Safar Abiyev; Səfər Əbiyev (1950–)	6 February 1995	22 October 2013	6833	New Azerbaijan Party	7. H.Əliyev II	1995	
7		Safar Abiyev; Səfər Əbiyev (1950–)	During Abiyev's tenure as defence minister, Azerbaijan has signed military cooperation agreements with Turkey, the United States, Pakistan and others; Partnership for Peace.						
8		Zakir Hasanov; Zakir Həsənov (1959–)	22 October 2013		4749	New Azerbaijan Party	8. İ.Əliyev I	2013	

== See also ==
- Azerbaijani Armed Forces
- Military history of Azerbaijan
- Prime Minister of Azerbaijan
- Cabinet of Azerbaijan
