= Military parades in Azerbaijan =

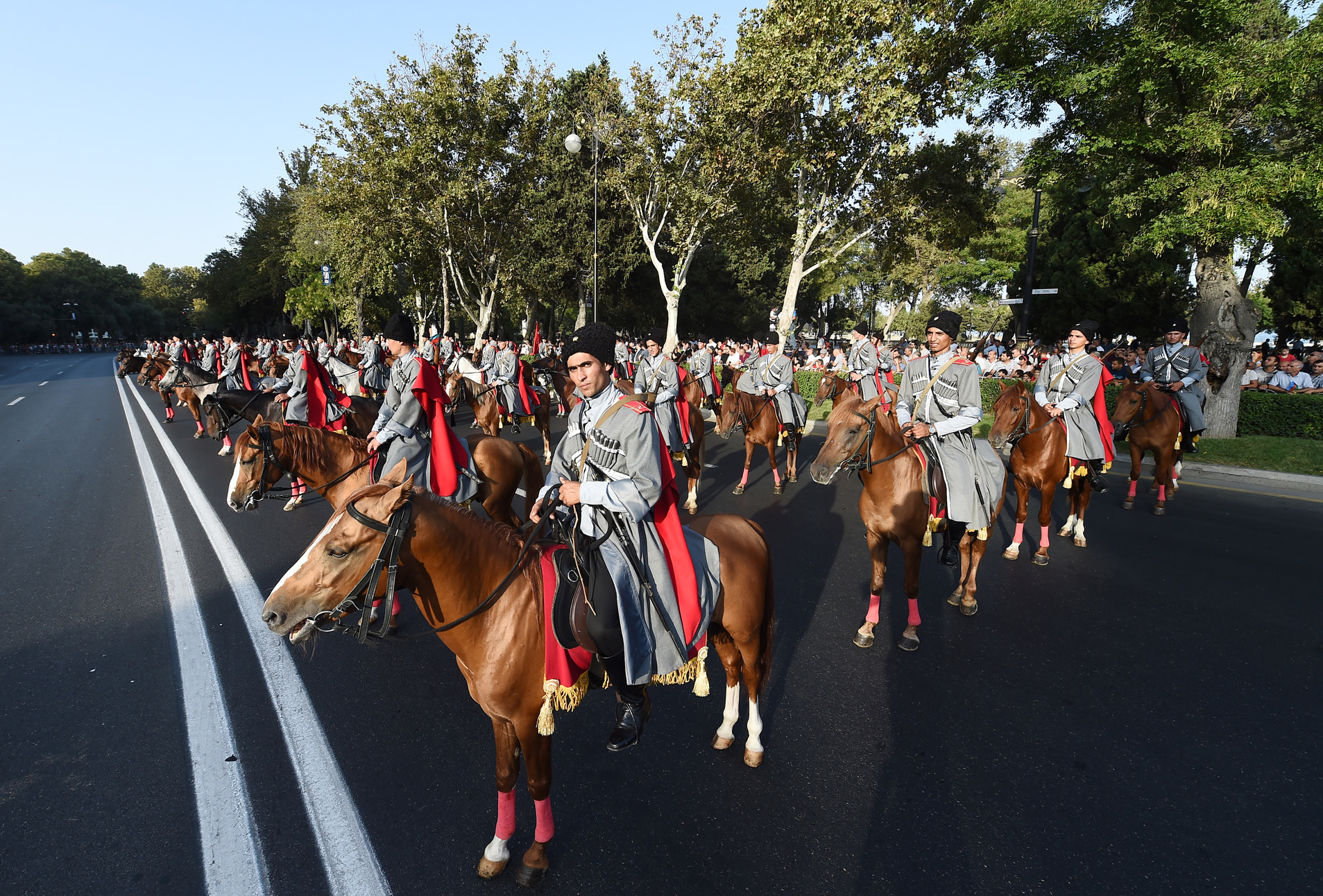
Mounted cavalry during a parade in September 2018

This article presents all the military parades held in Azerbaijan since the establishment of the first Azerbaijani nation in 1918. Currently, the semi-annual Day of the Armed Forces parade on 26 June is one of the biggest held in the former Soviet Union. All military parades consist of officers and personnel of the Ministry of Defense, the Ministry of Internal Affairs, the Ministry of Emergency Situations, the State Security Service, the State Border Service, the National Guard and the Special State Protection Service.

== Azerbaijani Democratic Republic (1918-1920) ==
On 15 September 1918, divisions of the Ottoman Empire marched into Baku in a victory parade reviewed by the command of the Third Army, with Nuri Killigil (founder and commander of the Islamic Army of the Caucasus) in attendance. The first military parade in the Azerbaijan Democratic Republic was held on May 28, 1919, in honor of the founding of the ADR. The parade was held in the area of the current Museum Centre. The parade coincided with the Independence Day holiday.

== Soviet Azerbaijan (1920-1991) ==
Prior to 1991, Baku hosted military parades as well as civil demonstrations in honor of national holidays in the Soviet Union such as October Revolution Day and International Workers' Day. During the 1967 October Revolution Parade on Lenin Square, the parade was opened by a guard of honor instead of drummers, one of the first cities to do that in their annual parade. In 1970, the Azerbaijan SSR celebrated the golden jubilee (50th anniversary) of its founding. It was celebrated with a military parade of the 4th Army in October of that year. The parade was planned for April, the month the republic was declared, but was postponed due to the celebrations of the 100th anniversary of the birth of Vladimir Lenin which took place earlier that month. In attendance was the Minister of Defence, Marshal of the Soviet Union Andrei Grechko. The last of these parades took place in 1989.

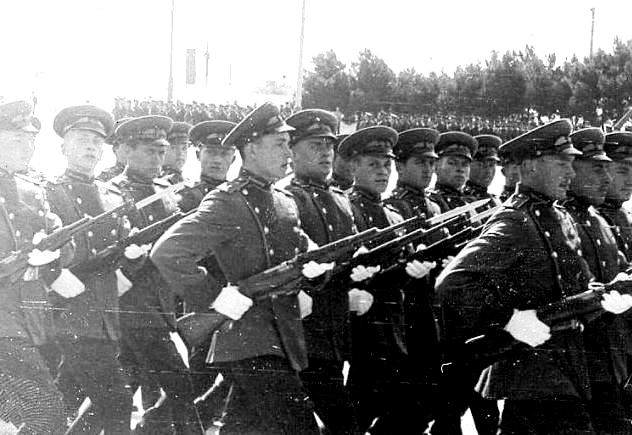
The BVOKU Honor Guard during a parade in Baku in 1966.

=== Overview and full order of Soviet era parades ===
The leadership of the Communist Party of Azerbaijan were the main guests at Soviet era parades, with the First Secretary being the particular guest of honour. The parade inspector was traditionally the commander of the Soviet 4th Army, while the commander was the commander of troops of the Baku Air Defense District (Dmitry Yazov and Fedor Olifirov being notable examples of both respective roles). After the holiday speech, the State Anthem of the Soviet Union and the Anthem of the Azerbaijan Soviet Socialist Republic are typically performed by the massed bands.

The full order of the parade is as follows:

- Ground Column
  - Corps of Drums or Guard of Honour of the Baku Higher Combined Arms Command School
  - Officers of the Baku Air Defense District
  - Officer Cadets of the BVOKU
  - Officer Cadets of the Caspian Higher Naval School
  - Sailors of the Caspian Flotilla
  - Paratroopers of the Soviet airborne
  - Infantry Forces of the 4th Army
  - Specialized Boarding School named after Jamshid Nakhchivanski
- Mobile Column
  - Light Wheeled Vehicles
  - Tanks
  - Infantry fighting vehicles
  - Artillery
  - Anti-aircraft vehicles
  - Low powered missiles
  - BM-21 Grads
- Military Band of the Baku Garrison
- Demonstration of Workers

Preparation for the parade usually began two months in advance at the local unit barracks, with participants often preparing up to two hours a day for the parade.

== Azerbaijani Republic (1991-present) ==
=== Overview ===
The guest of honor at most parades is the President of Azerbaijan (attending as the Supreme Commander of the Armed Forces), who arrives at around 10am to the top of Government House to the tune of a fanfare after which he receives the Defense Minister's report. After this, the massed bands of the Baku Garrison perform the Azərbaycan marşı, after which the President then delivers the holiday address to the armed services. Following the address, an MC (which for the past six parades has been Honored Worker of Azerbaijan Colonel Abdullah Gurbani) gives a special holiday greeting and historical address before the parade commander (usually the Commander of the Baku Military Unit) orders the parade to begin the march past in quick time:

- Tri-Service Colour Guard and Color Guard of the Flag of Azerbaijan
- Drum and Bugle Corps of the Jamshid Nakhchivanski Military Lyceum
- Baku Garrison Officer
- Azerbaijan Higher Military Academy (three contingents from different branch faculties)
- Foreign troops (if any)
- Azerbaijani Land Forces
- Internal Troops of Azerbaijan
- Marines
- State Security Service
- State Border Service
- Ministry of Emergency Situations
- National Guard of Azerbaijan
- Mobile column
- Air portion

The parade also includes a fleet review.

=== By holiday ===
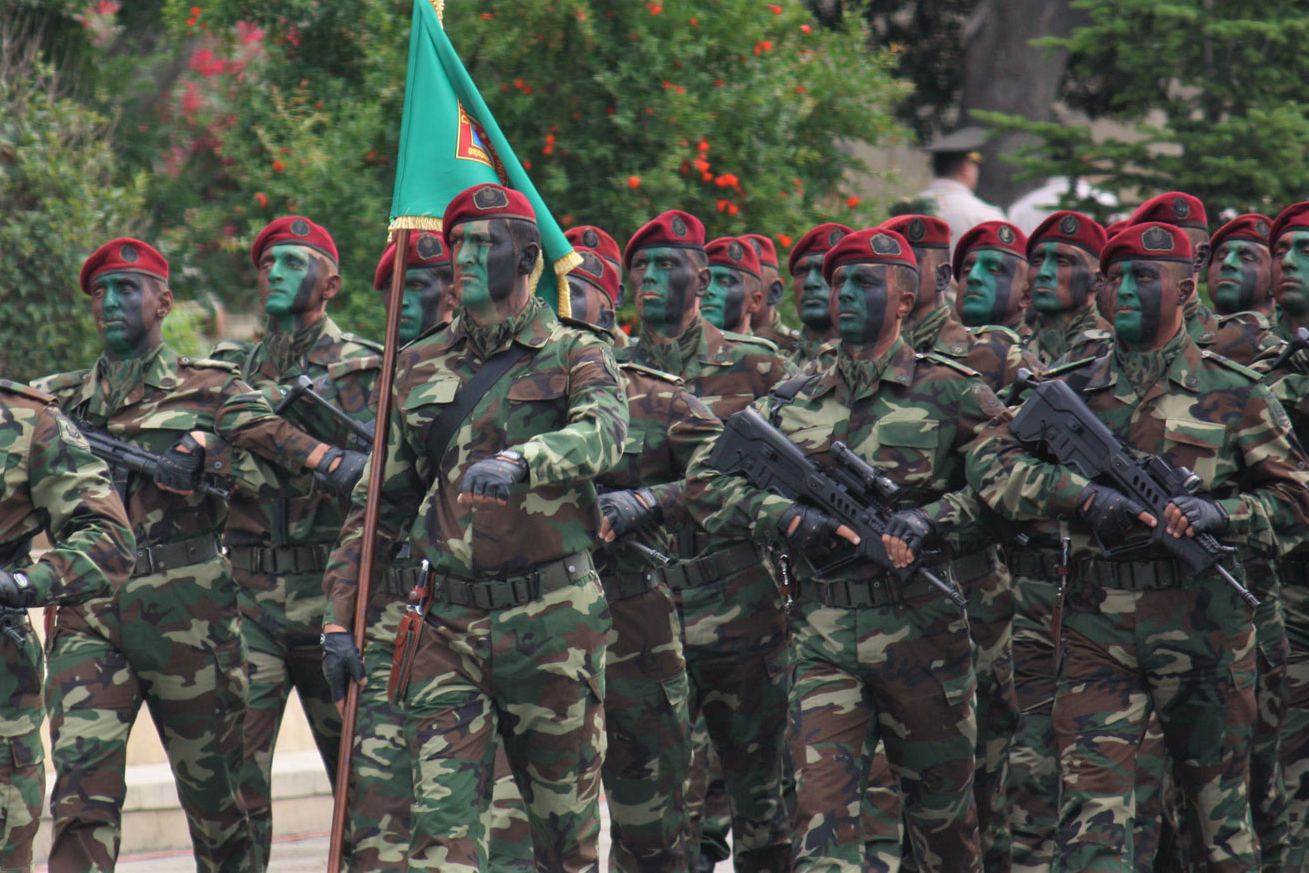
Special Forces of Azerbaijan

==== Armed Forces Day ====
The second parade in history was held on October 9, 1992, and was the first one held since the restoration of independence. It was held on Azadlig square in honor of the anniversary of the one year anniversary of the establishment of the Azerbaijani Armed Forces. It was the first and only Azerbaijani military parade to follow the Soviet era format which included the inspection by the defense minister and the three-fold Oorah by the troops. The parade was presided by President Abulfaz Elchibey and defense minister Rahim Gaziyev. The parade, which was also commanded by Major General Nuraddin Sadigov, featured a limited number of military equipment and at end of the event, paratroopers jumped from helicopters on the square. Preparations for the parade took less than a month and included two companies serving in the area of hostilities, which immediately after the parade returned to Nagorno-Karabakh. During the parade held in Nakhchivan, future president Heydar Aliyev and chairman of the legislature said the following: "Every year for 70 years, we have participated in the celebrations of the armed forces of the former Soviet Union. But today's holiday is a source of great pride in the heart of each of us. We are in great joy. Because the people of Azerbaijan have finally created a national army to defend their state, their nation, their homeland".

The third military parade was held on June 26, 2008, as part of the armed forces 90th-anniversary celebrations. It was the first one held since 1992. This parade for the first time, included some Turkish parade elements during the ceremony, such as the use of guidons and the greeting Salam askerler which literally means Hello Soldiers in the English language. Around 4,500 military personnel, as well as dozens of various types of military equipment were displayed at the parade.

The fourth military parade took place on June 26, 2011, in honor of the 20th anniversary of the restoration of the independence of Azerbaijan and the 93rd anniversary of the Azerbaijani Armed Forces. Nearly 6,000 troops were attended at the parade.

The fifth military parade was held on June 26, 2013, on the occasion of the 95th anniversary of the Armed Forces.

The sixth military parade was held on June 26, 2018, in Azadlig Square on the occasion of the 100th anniversary of the establishment of the Armed Forces. A Turkish Army formation (led by Captain Goja Arsoy), as well as a group of Turkish Air Force fighter jets took part in the parade.

==== War victory celebrations (2020-present) ====
On 10 December 2020, a victory parade was held in honor of the Azerbaijani victory in the Second Nagorno-Karabakh War. A group of the military servicemen who distinguished themselves during the Patriotic War (how the conflict is referred to in Azerbaijan) marched in the parade and showcase military equipment, unmanned aerial vehicles and aircraft, as well as war trophies. 3,000 servicemen marched in the parade, which included a contingent from Turkish Special Forces Command march on the square. Turkish President Recep Tayyip Erdoğan attended as part of a state visit to Baku. A military spokesperson described it as "the first important event in the history of Azerbaijan’s development, since the Victory Parade has never taken place in Azerbaijan and Freedom Square has never seen the Victory Parade". In response to reports by Armenian social media that Armenian captives would take part in the parade, the State Security Service of Azerbaijan rejected the information as false saying that "humiliating prisoners of war is not a characteristic of the Azerbaijani people and our victorious army".

Parades also take place to honor the war victory with parades on 8 November, the official Victory Day marking the end of the war. The third anniversary of the victory was timed to coincide with a military parade held on the Veratsnound in central Khankendi after the complete transfer of Nagorno-Karabakh to the control of Azerbaijan during the 2023 Azerbaijani offensive in Nagorno-Karabakh.

The Karabakh Victory Parade was held on 8 November 2025 in Azadliq Square, Baku, to mark the fifth anniversary of Azerbaijan’s victory in the 2020 Patriotic War. The parade was attended by the President of the Republic of Azerbaijan, Ilham Aliyev, First Lady Mehriban Aliyeva, President of the Republic of Türkiye, Recep Tayyip Erdoğan, and Prime Minister of the Islamic Republic of Pakistan, Muhammad Shehbaz Sharif. The event began with the national anthems of Azerbaijan, Türkiye, and Pakistan, followed by a moment of silence to honor the memory of Heydar Aliyev and the fallen soldiers who sacrificed their lives for Azerbaijan’s territorial integrity.

==== Other holidays ====
In October 2017, a military parade was held through the capital of the Nakhchivan Autonomous Republic in honor of the 25th anniversary of the establishment of the first military unit. It also coincided with that 26th anniversary of the restoration of independence. The event was attended by the President of Nakhchivan Vasif Talibov and Azerbaijani Defense Minister Zakir Hasanov.

In September 2018, a parade was held that celebrated the 100th anniversary of the Ottoman–Azerbaijani victory in the 1918 Battle of Baku. Being a joint celebration between Azerbaijan and Turkey, the massed bands of the Military Band Service of the Armed Forces of Azerbaijan performed the İstiklal Marşı and President Recep Tayyip Erdoğan attended the military parade as the guest of honor as well as delivered a keynote address with President Aliyev. Alongside military personnel were troops of the Turkish Armed Forces who had participated in an armed forces parade earlier that year.

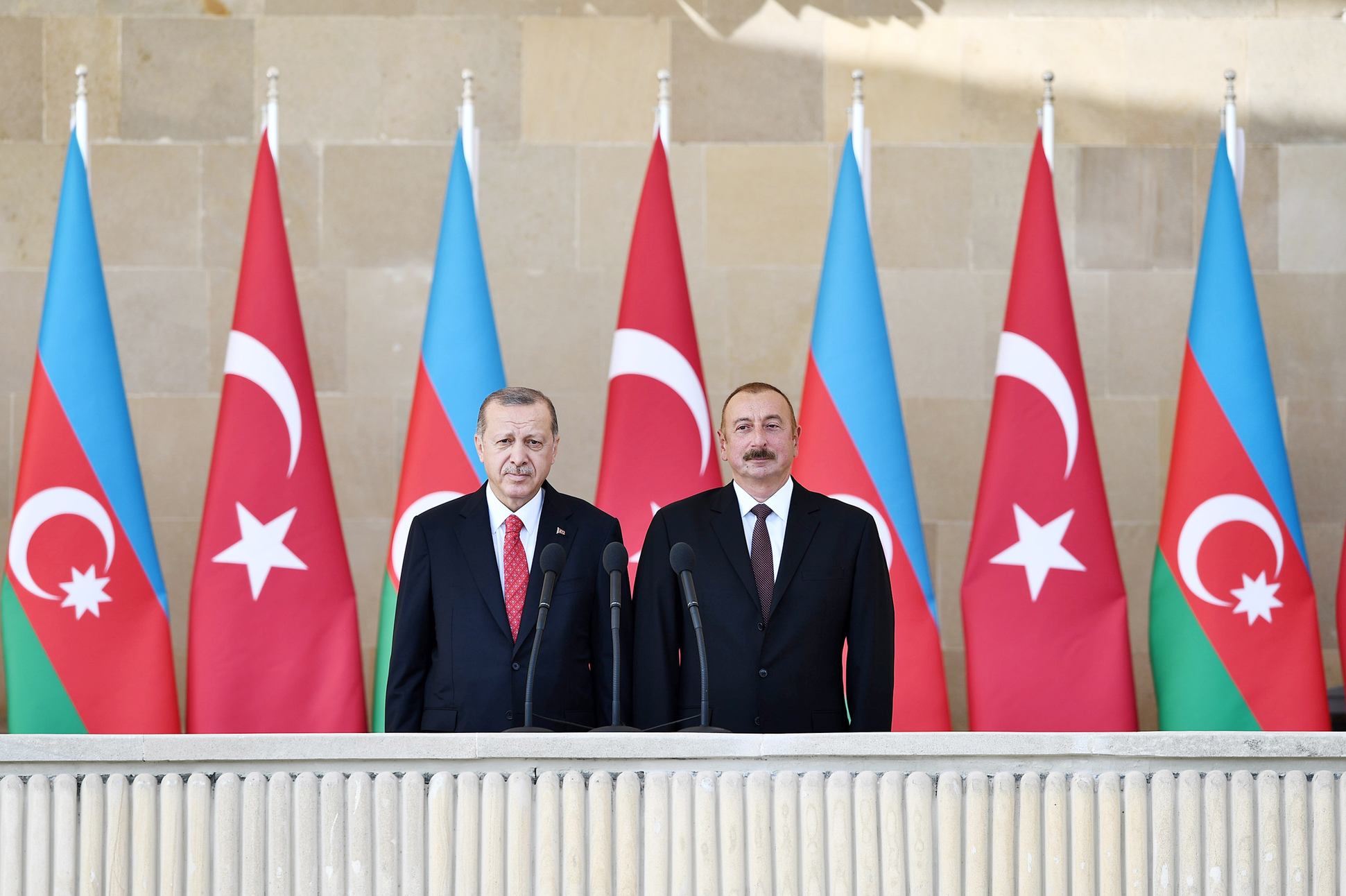
Presidents Ilham Aliyev and Recep Tayyip Erdogan.

On 19 November, the city of Sumgayit held a parade in honor of the 70th anniversary of its founding in front of the Executive Power building of the city. During the parade, the Azerbaijani flag was carried on the shoulders of servicemen, with personnel of the Rapid Reaction Unit of the State Border Service demonstrating their combat skills.

Other smaller scale military parades are held on different occasions in Baku and other parts of the country. These parades are commonly held on major holidays such as Independence Day (28 May), Victory Day (9 May), Day of Restoration of Independence (18 October). On the Victory Day holiday, the parade is held at the monument to Major General Hazi Aslanov. On the occasion of Independence Day, personnel of the units of the Baku Garrison march through the streets of Baku.

== Gallery ==
2011

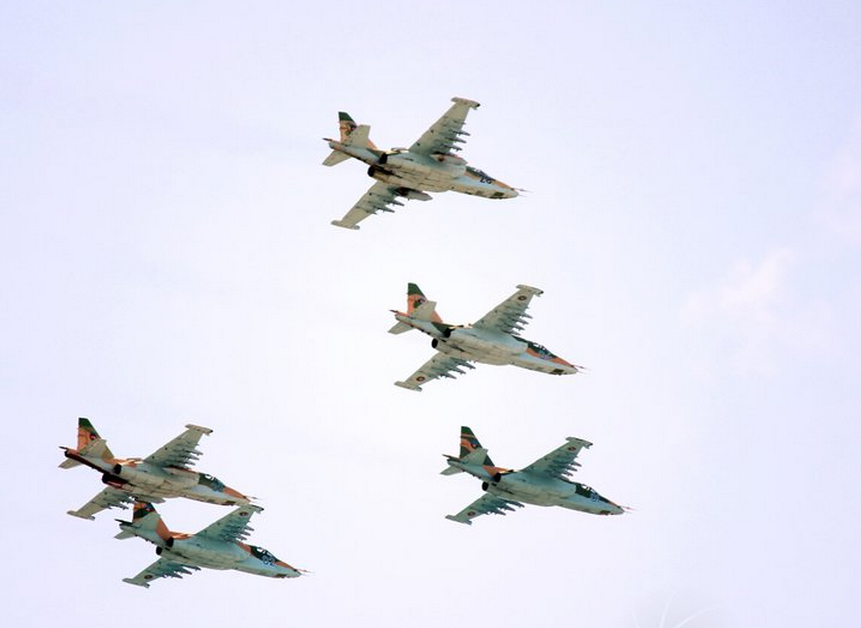

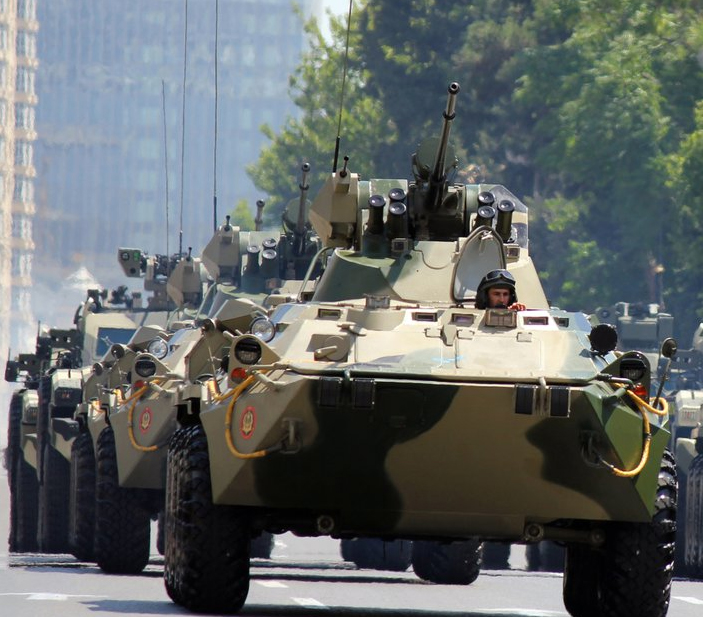

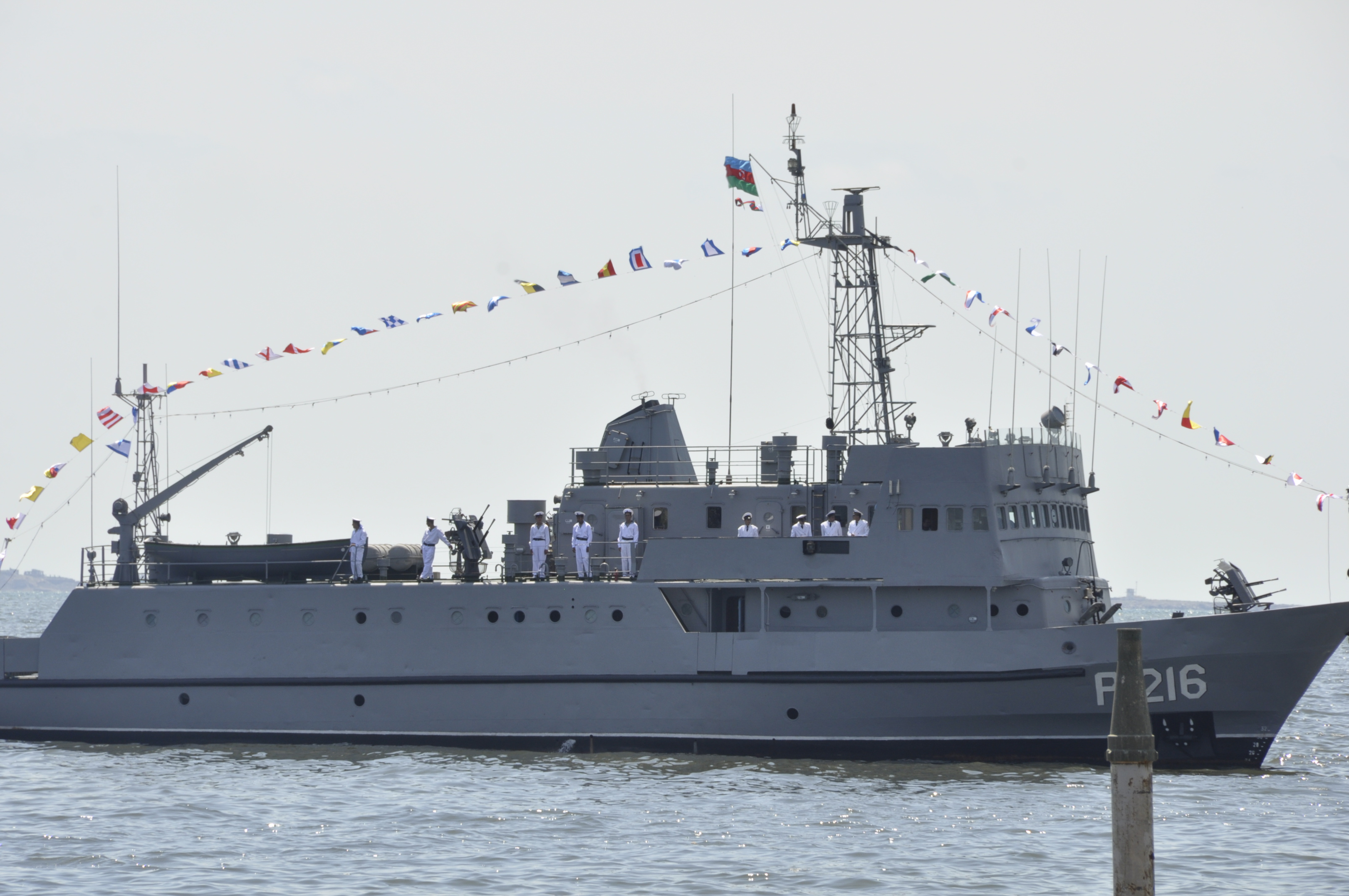

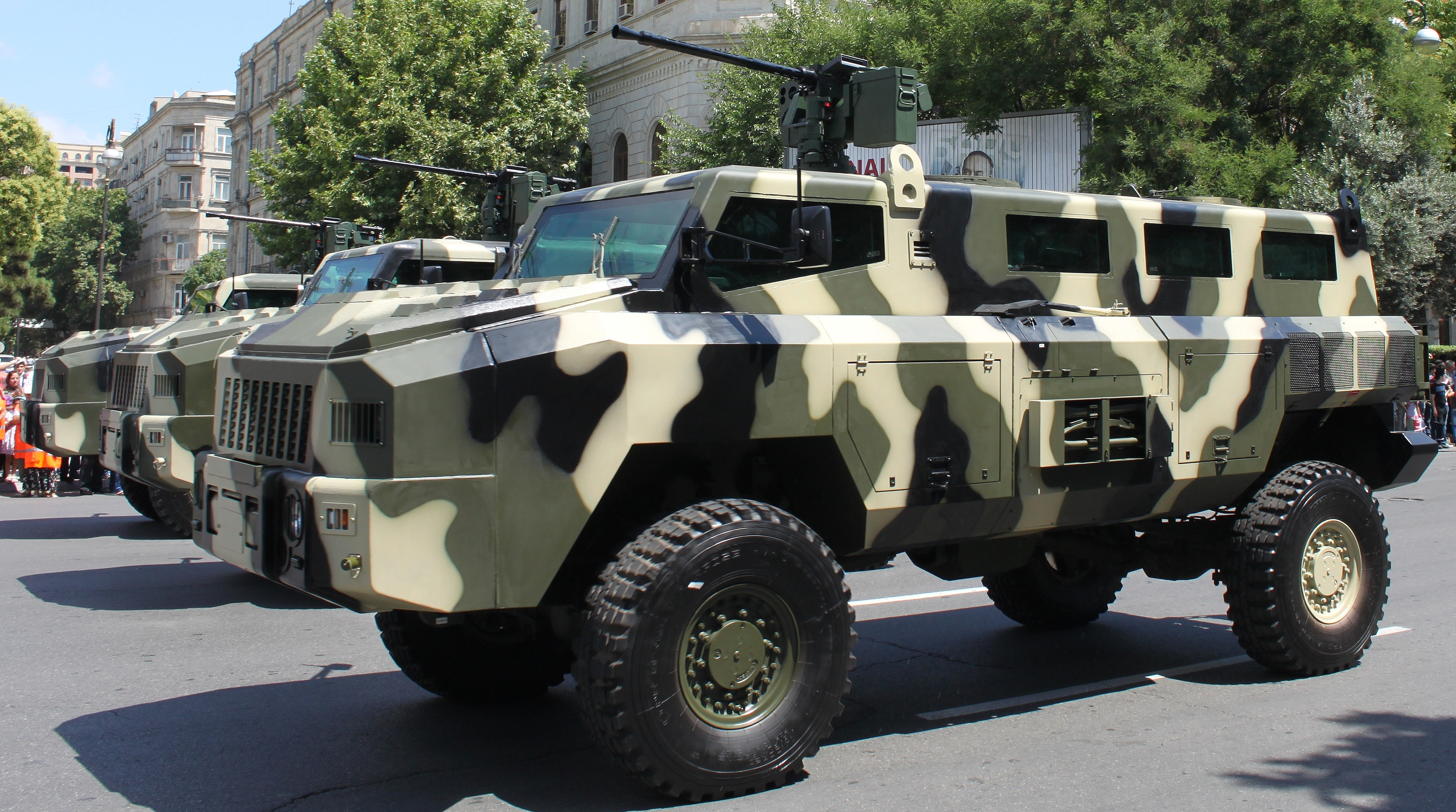

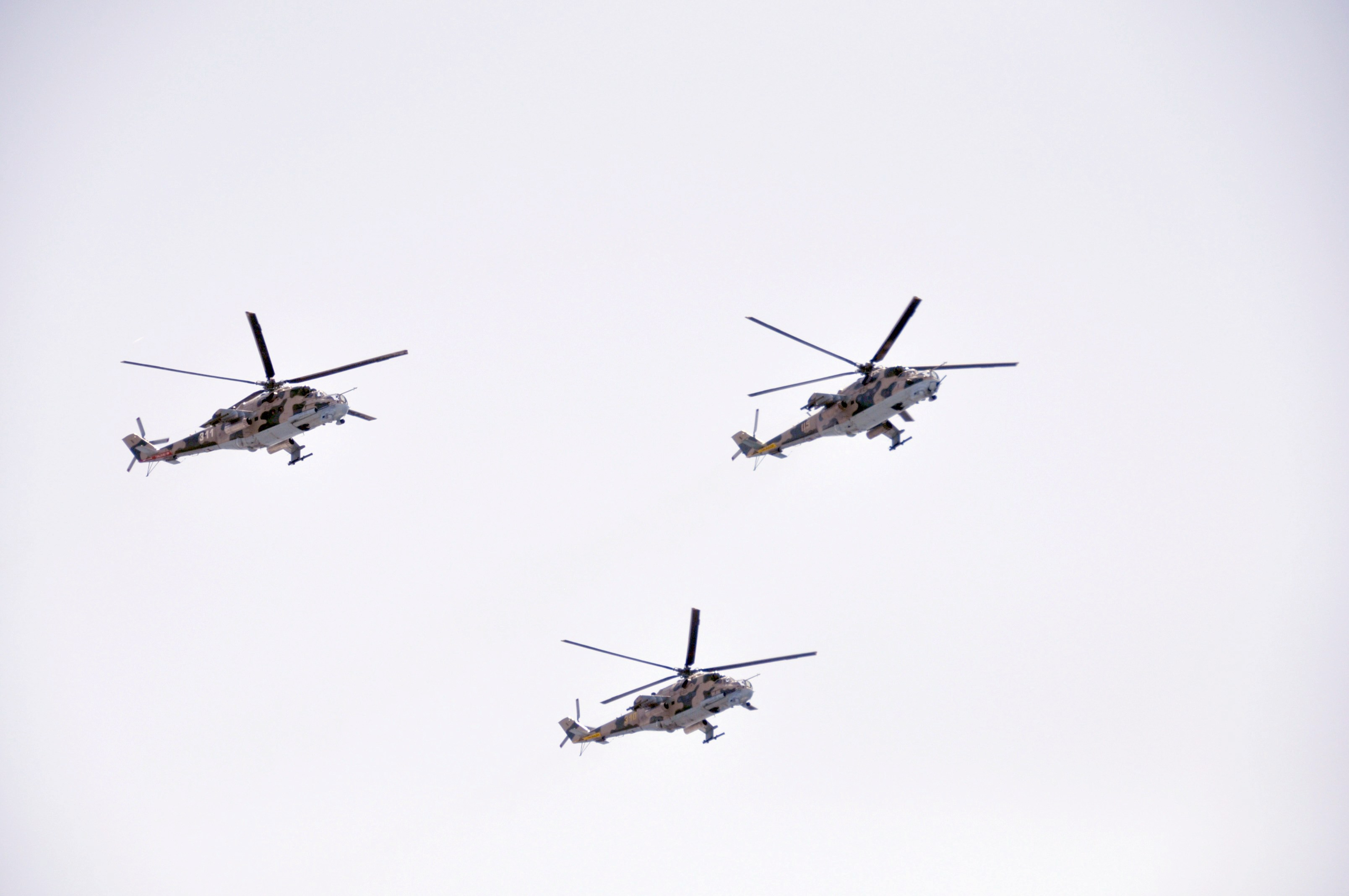

2013

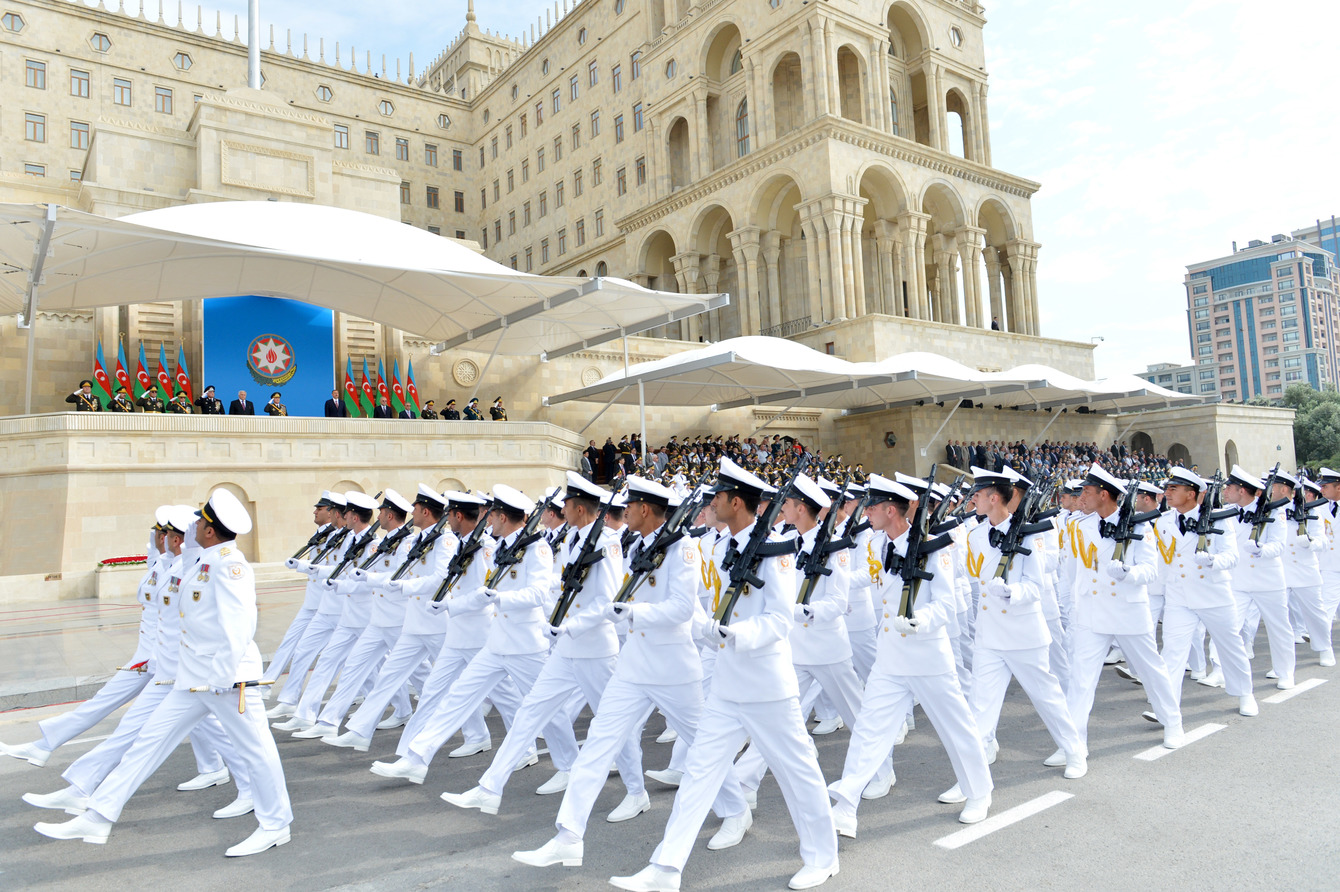

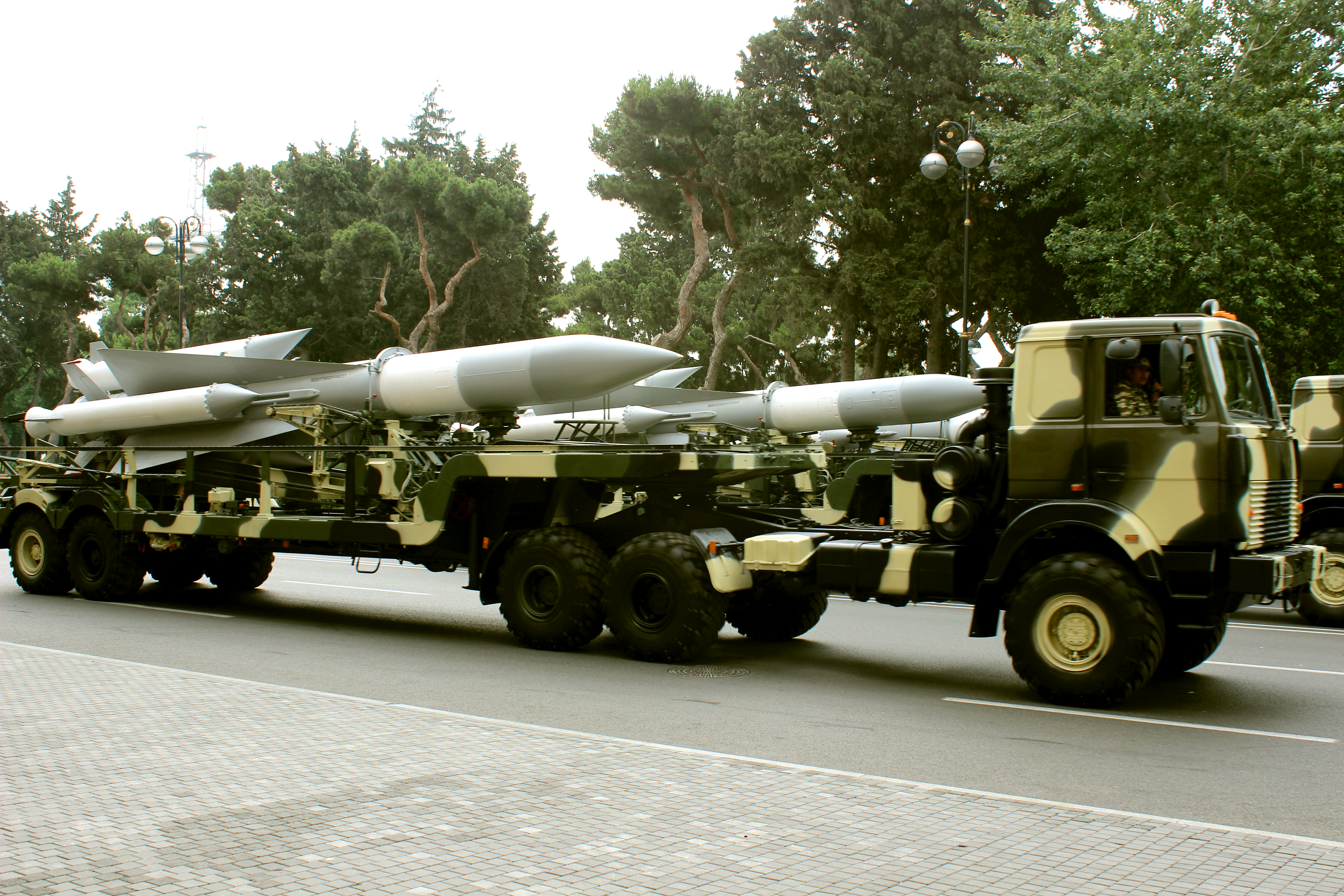

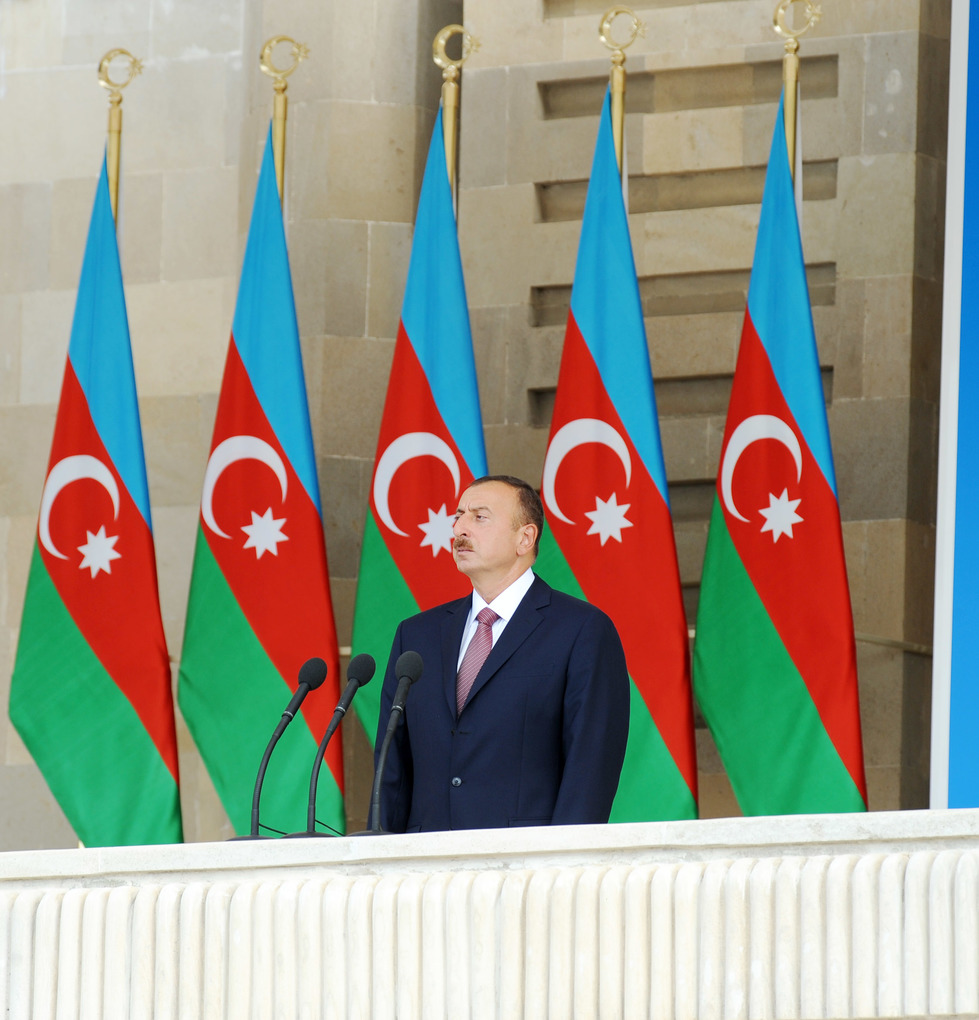

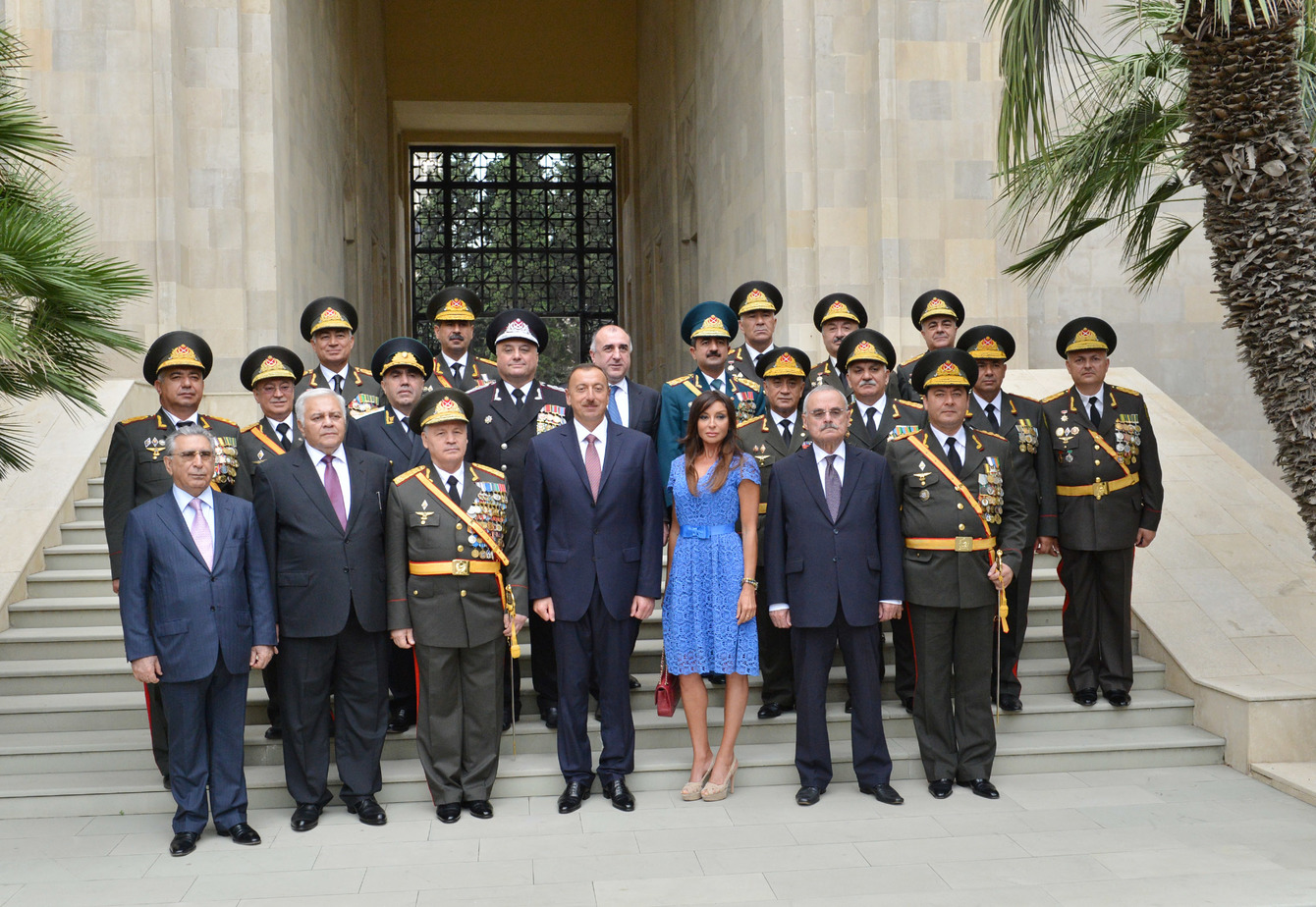

September 2018

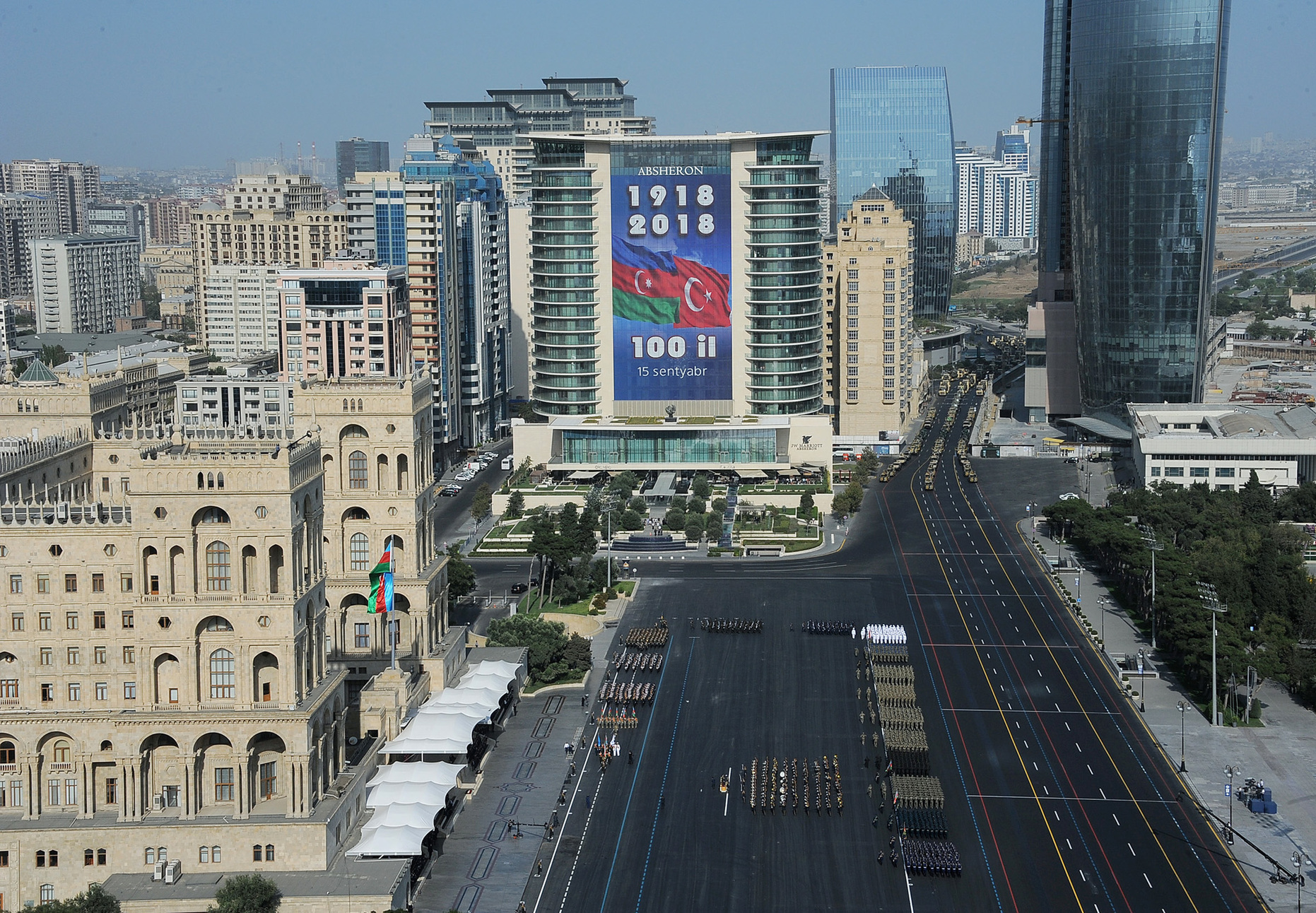

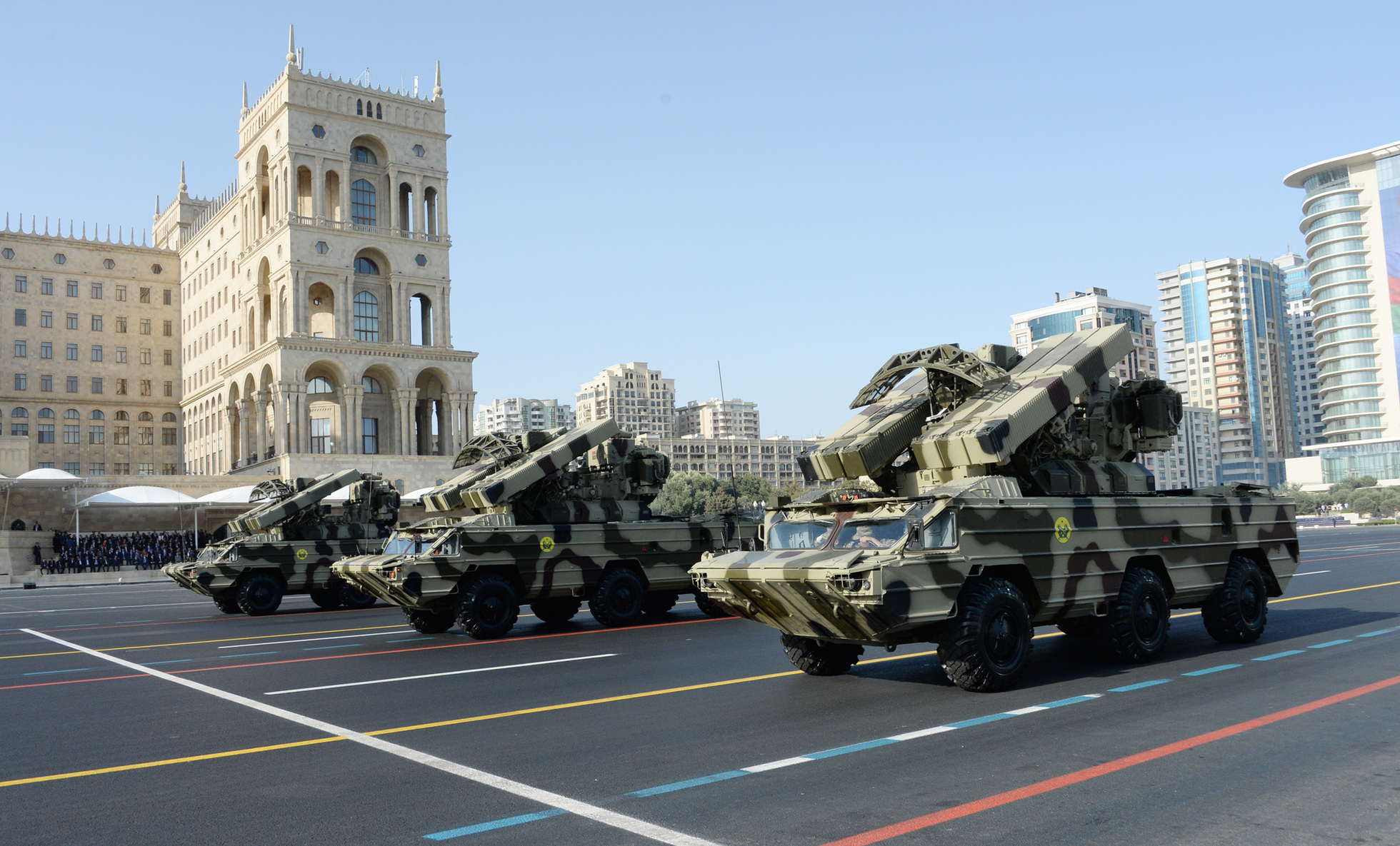

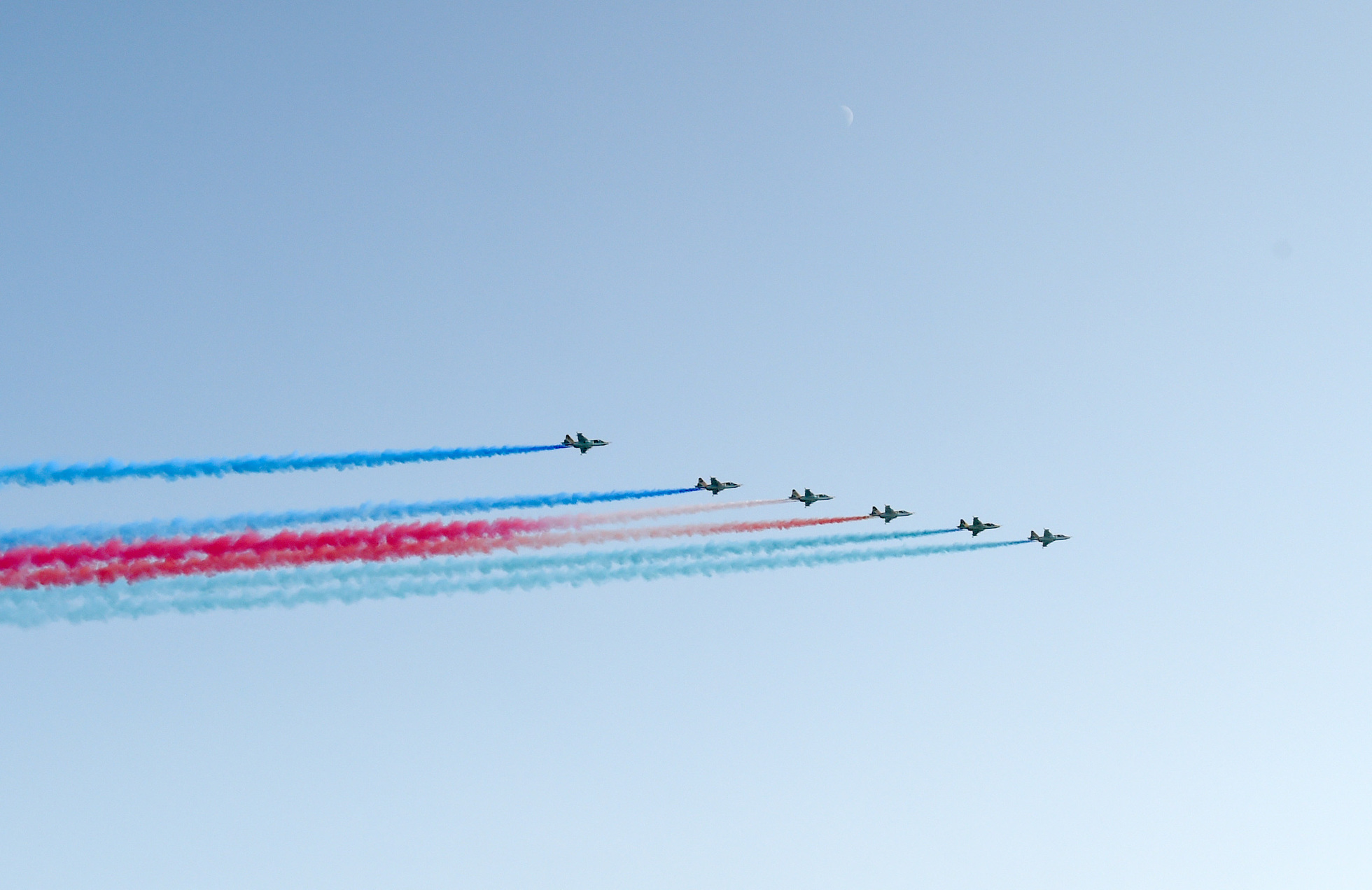

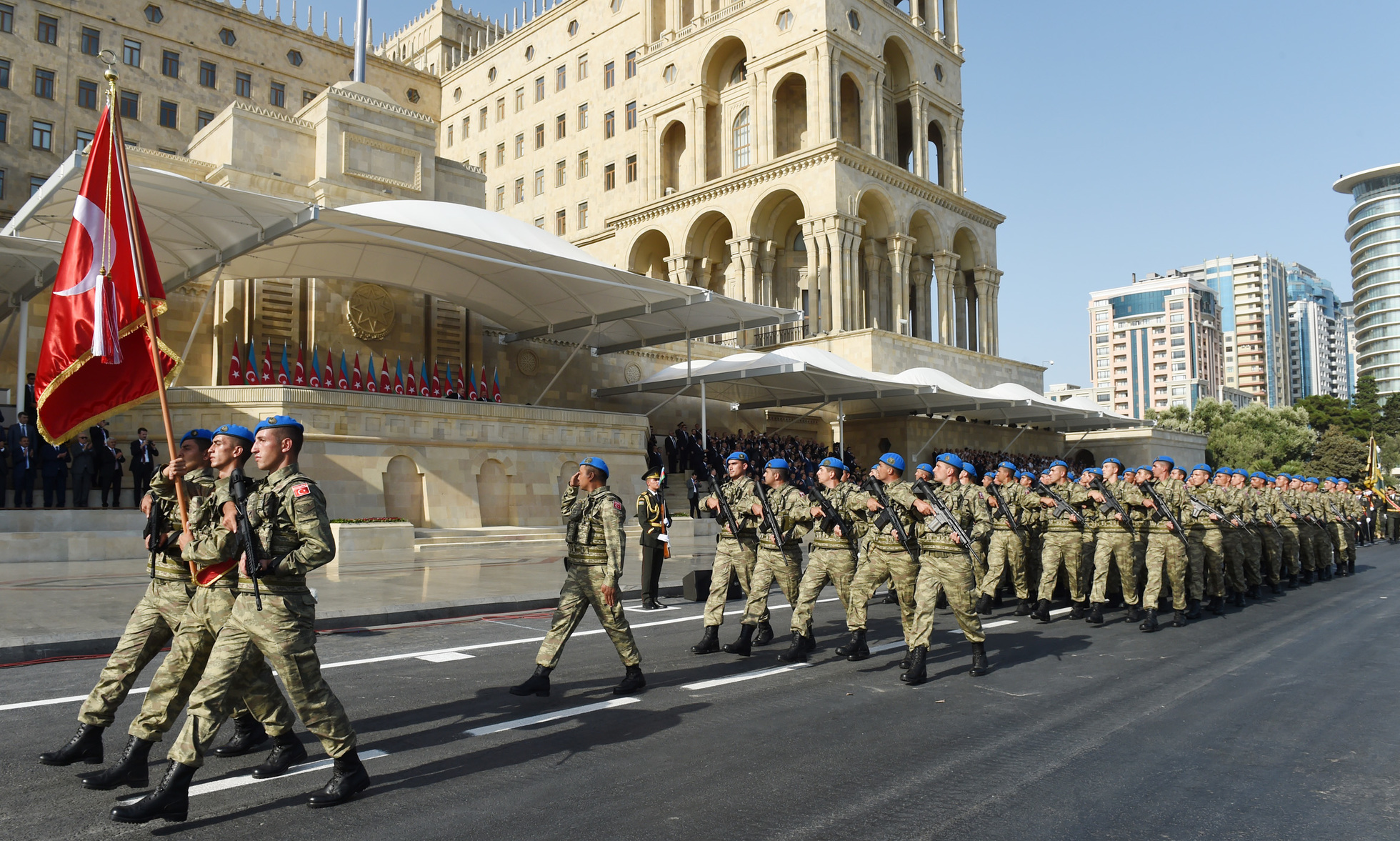
