= Yusif Akhundzade =

Military director and musician

Major General Yusif Akhundzade People's Artist of Azerbaijan
- Yusif Yevgeniyeviç Axundzadə; Юсиф Евгеньевич Ахундзаде́
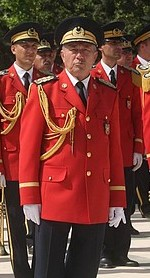
- Born: February 6, 1946 (age 80); Baku, Azerbaijan SSR, Soviet Union
- Education: Baku Academy of Music
- Military career
- Allegiance: USSR; Azerbaijan
- Branch: Azerbaijani Armed Forces
- Service years: 1971–2024
- Rank: Major General
- Commands: Military Band Service of the Armed Forces of Azerbaijan

Yusif Akhundzade (Azerbaijani: Yusif Yevgeniyeviç Axundzadə; Russian: Юсиф Евгеньевич Ахундзаде́) is an Azerbaijani military conductor and director. Akhundzade was the current Senior Military Director of the Military Band Service of the Armed Forces of Azerbaijan. He also served concurrently as the director of the Central Band of the Ministry of Defense of Azerbaijan, a position he held from 1992-2024.

== Early life and career ==
He was born on February 6, 1946, in the city of Baku. In 1969, he graduated from his flute class at the Baku Academy of Music. In 1971, he joined the Soviet Armed Forces, immediately becoming a musician in the Song and Dance Ensemble of the Caspian Flotilla.

=== Caspian Naval School ===
Shortly before completing his compulsory service, he received an offer from Rear Admiral Georgy Stepanov, the head of the Caspian Higher Naval School named after Sergei Kirov (now the Azerbaijan Higher Naval Academy), to head its band, an offer Akhundzade accepted. During his service in this band, Akhundzade participated in the 1971 and 1983 October Revolution Parades on Moscow's Red Square.

In 1979, a group of students from Guinea came to study at the school. As the cadets did not know the Russian language, they could not verbally communicate what the national anthem of Guinea (Liberté) sounded like (the sheet music was not in the files at the time) to Akhundzade in time for the visit of the Guinean delegation. Akhundzade later asked one of the cadets to hum the anthem, after which he transcribed it and orchestrated it the next day. It made an impression on the school administration, which resulted in Akhundzade being awarded the honorary title of Honored Cultural Worker shortly after this event.

Some musicians of the Band of the Caspian Higher Naval School who served under the direction of Akhundzade later became teachers, artists and conductors in various cities and countries, including one who is a director of a military band in Russia.

=== Post-independence ===
He began teaching at the Academy of Music in 1989 before being invited to lead the newly formed Military Band Service of the Armed Forces of Azerbaijan in 1992. Since then, he has led the exemplary band during welcoming ceremonies for foreign leaders and led the massed bands during the parades in honor of the 90th, 93rd, 95th, and 100th anniversary of the Azerbaijani Armed Forces. On the eve of the 95th-anniversary parade in 2013, he was awarded the rank of colonel. In a 2019 interview, he declared his intention for his band to perform at a victory parade in Shusha's Jidir Plain should the Nagorno-Karabakh conflict be resolved.

His son Rufat (born 1981), serves as an associate band director as well as a teacher at the Department of Breath and Percussion of Baku Music Academy. In early 2024, he retired and was replaced by Rufat as head of the band service.

== Awards and Titles ==
- Honored Worker of Culture of the Azerbaijan SSR (1979)
- Honored Artist of the Azerbaijan SSR (1988)
- People's Artist of Azerbaijan (1998)
- Medal "For Military Merit" (2003)
- Azerbaijani Flag Order
- Shohrat Order (2021)

In early 2020, he was elected a member of the International Academy of Turkic World Studies, and was awarded the "Gold Star" medal.

== See also ==
- Military Band Service of the Armed Forces of Azerbaijan
- Baku Academy of Music
- Azerbaijani Armed Forces
