= Day of Restoration of Independence (Azerbaijan) =

State holiday in Azerbaijan

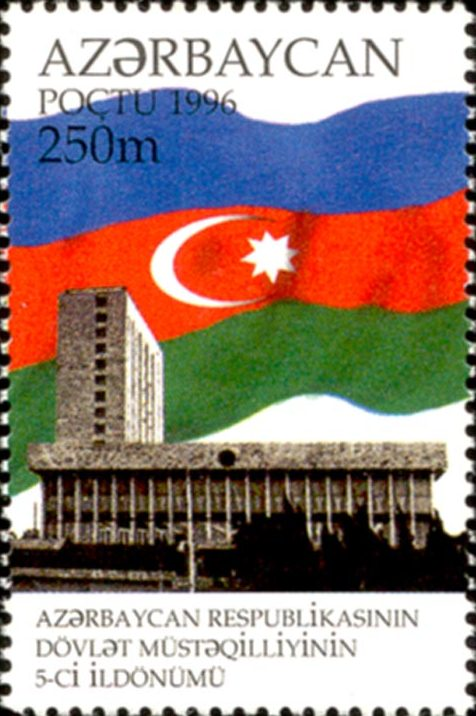
- A stamp celebrating the 5th anniversary of independence
- Observed by: Azerbaijan
- Type: State
- Significance: The day the Declaration of Independence was adopted by the Supreme Soviet of the Azerbaijan SSR in 1991.
- Celebrations: Fireworks, Concerts, Parades
- Date: 18 October
- Next time: 18 October 2026
- Frequency: annual

The Day of Restoration of Independence (Azerbaijani: Azərbaycanda Müstəqilliyin Bərpası Günü) is a state holiday in Azerbaijan. It is celebrated annually on October 18. On this day in 1991, the Supreme Soviet of Azerbaijan adopted a Constitutional Act on the Declaration of Independence of Azerbaijan. The declaration was confirmed by a referendum in December 1991.

Until 2021, it was marked as Independence Day. In October 2021, it was renamed and became Day of Restoration of Independence.

== Celebrations ==
The fifth anniversary celebrations of 1996 were the first major celebrations of the holiday. Large scale celebrations also took place on the 10th anniversary in 2001. In 2017, a military parade was held through the capital of the Nakhchivan Autonomous Republic in honor of the 25th anniversary of the establishment of the first military unit and 26th anniversary of the restoration of independence. The event was attended by the President of Nakhchivan Vasif Talibov and Azerbaijani Defense Minister Zakir Hasanov.

=== Connected commemorations with Independence Day ===
The second parade of independent Azerbaijan was held on Azadliq Square on October 9, 1992, in commemoration of the first anniversary of the establishment of the Azerbaijani Armed Forces, and was held also in connection with the anniversary of the restoration of independence. In 1998, the inauguration of Heydar Aliyev coincided with the celebration of Independence Day. A year later, in 1999, the celebrations of the 75th anniversary of the Nakhchivan Autonomous Republic were connected with the Independence Day holiday just 6 days later.

== Foreign commemorations ==
In 2020, Canada's Niagara Falls were lit up in colours of Azerbaijani flag to mark Independence Day. That same year, a Turkish delegation led by Speaker of the Grand National Assembly of Turkey Mustafa Sentop visited Baku to participate in the celebrations, in a show of support for Azerbaijan after the Ganja ballistic missile attacks.

== Gallery ==
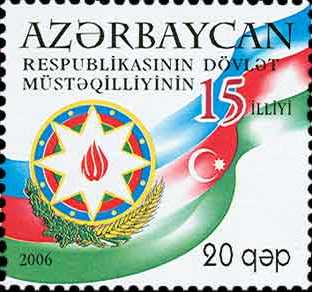
A stamp celebrating the 15th anniversary of independence.

== See also ==
- Republic Day (Azerbaijan)
- Public holidays in Azerbaijan
