= Military Band Service of the Armed Forces of Azerbaijan =

- Azərbaycan Respublikası Silahlı Qüvvələrinin Hərbi Orkestr Xidməti
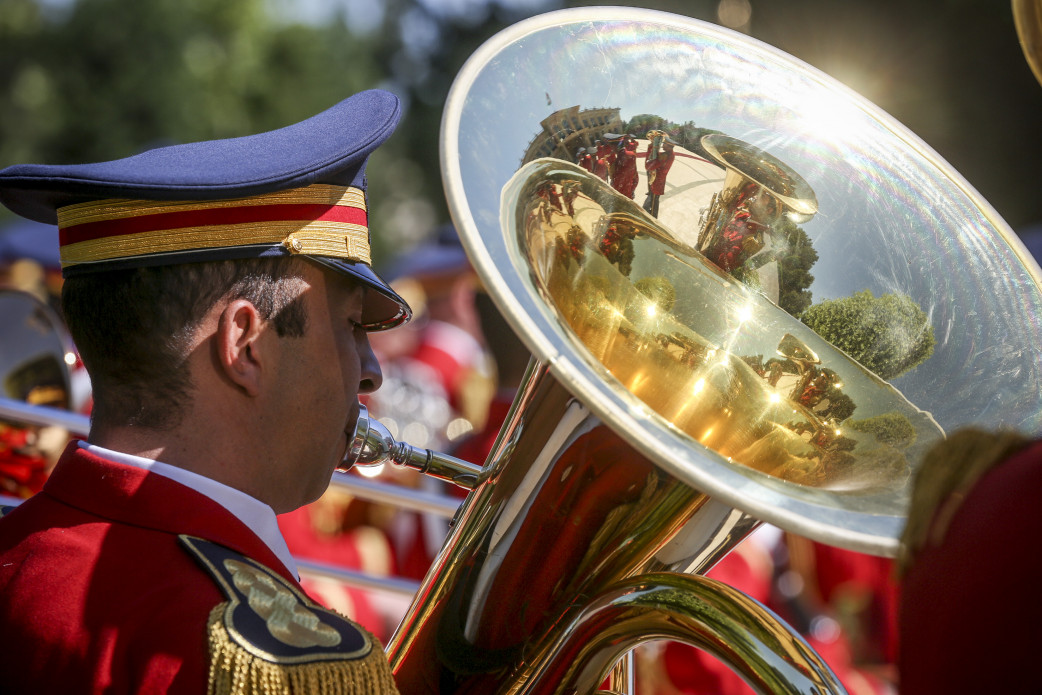
- Active: 1992 - present
- Country: Azerbaijan
- Branch: Azerbaijani Armed Forces
- Type: Military band organization
- Part of: Main Department of Personnel of the Ministry of Defense
- Headquarters: Baku
- Nickname: MBS

Commanders
- Chief Military Director of Music and Head of the Exemplary Band: Colonel Rufat Akhundzade
- Notable commanders: Lieutenant Colonel S. Resetov; Lieutenant Colonel A. Karimov; Major General Yusif Akhundzade

Insignia
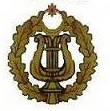
- Shoulder Patch

The Military Band Service of the Armed Forces of the Republic of Azerbaijan (Azerbaijani: Azərbaycan Respublikası Silahlı Qüvvələrinin Hərbi Orkestr Xidməti) is the official military band service of the Azerbaijani Armed Forces. It is part of the command structure of the Ministry of Defense of Azerbaijan.

== History of Azerbaijani military bands ==
In the early days of the establishment of the Azerbaijani National Army of the Azerbaijan Democratic Republic, a military band was created in a short period of time. The first military parade in Baku in 1919 was accompanied by a military band. Military bands have always existed in the history of the Azerbaijan Soviet Socialist Republic. During Yusif Akhundzade's service as director of the school band of the Caspian Higher Naval School (later known as the Azerbaijan Higher Naval Academy), it participated in the 1971 and 1983 October Revolution Day Parade on Moscow's Red Square. In 1971, the band's performance on Kutuzovsky Prospekt featured the famous Azeri march Vatan by composer Alimardan Aliyev, which was one of the few times oriental music was played at a military parade in Moscow. A band was also maintained in the Baku Higher Combined Arms Command School.

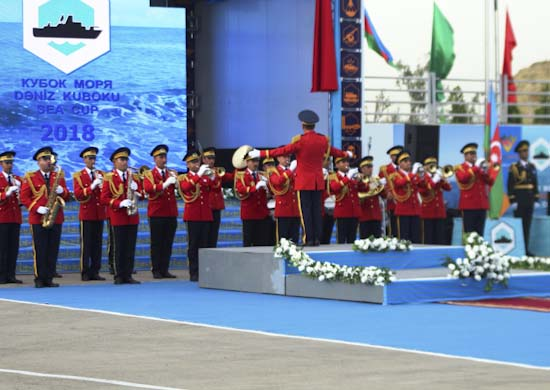
A band during the 2018 International Army Games.

=== Foundation of the service ===
On the basis of the bands of the Baku Garrison, Transcaucasian Military District of the Soviet Armed Forces, the military band service was founded on 1 July 1992 by order of the Minister of Defense Rahim Gaziyev. The debut performance of the units of the band service was on 9 October 1992 during the Day of the Armed Forces parade on Azadliq Square. Being a young unit, it needed to get specially designed uniforms for the parade. This was the result of having to wear military uniforms left over from the Soviet Army. During preparations for the state visit of President of Turkey Turgut Özal, the military attache of the Turkish embassy in Baku entered the band training hall, to which he was disappointed in the uniforms of musicians, with the Turkish Army sending parade uniforms and musical instruments sometime later.

President Heydar Aliyev supervised the training of national cadres in the band and the training of military music specialists. In the first years of the formation of the service, the soloists of the exemplary band took part in the farewell ceremonies of the personnel going to the battle in the First Nagorno-Karabakh War. In the 90s, military bands in the Land Forces, Air Force and Navy, as well as special educational institutions were created.

== Composition ==
The exemplary band performing the fanfare of the President of Azerbaijan.

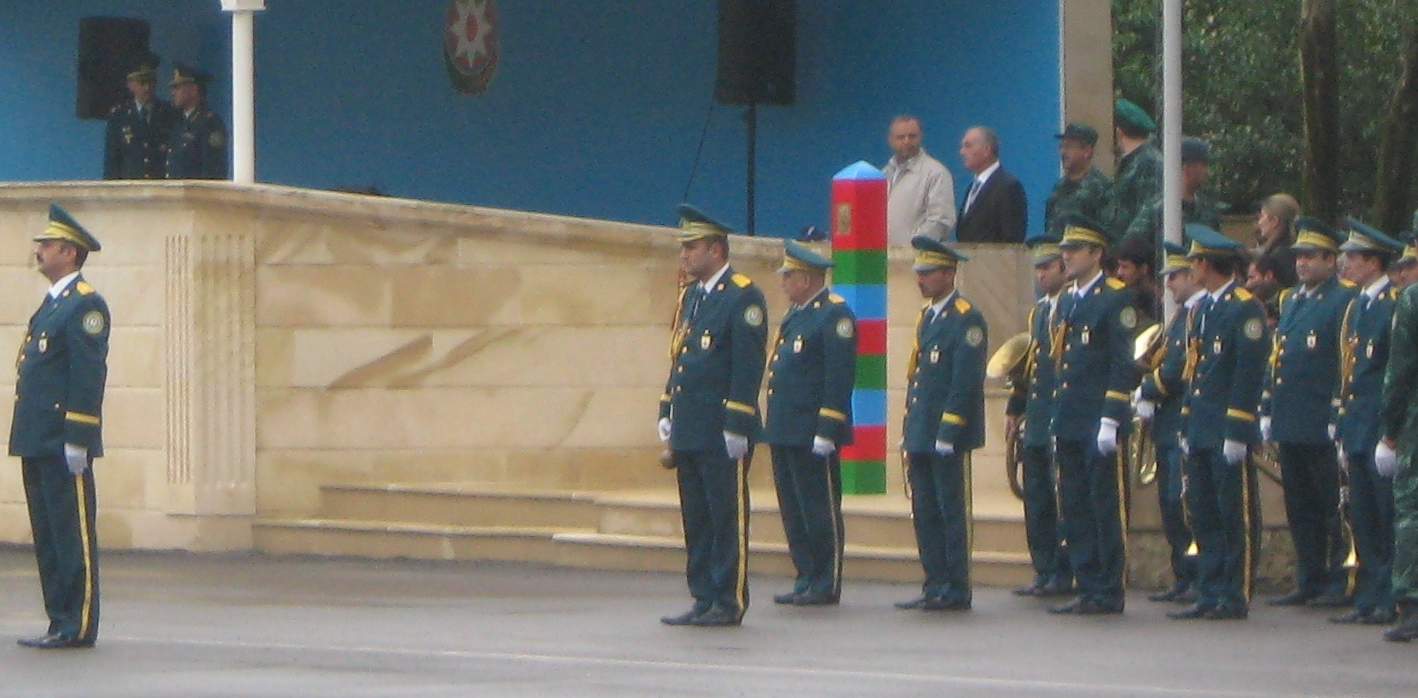
The Band of the State Border Service of Azerbaijan with its leader, A. Rzaev, at its head

The MBS of the Armed Forces is composed of the following bands:

- Exemplary Band of the Ministry of Defense of Azerbaijan
- Exemplary Band of the State Border Service of Azerbaijan
- Exemplary Band of the Internal Troops of Azerbaijan
- Headquarters bands of Military Garrisons
  - Band of the Nakhchivan Garrison
  - Band of the Ganja Garrison
- Cadet bands
  - Band of the Azerbaijan Higher Military Academy
  - Band of the Jamshid Nakhchivanski Military Lyceum
  - Band of the Heydar Aliyev Military Lyceum

=== Specific bands ===
==== Exemplary Band of the Ministry of Defense ====
The Exemplary Band of the Ministry of Defense of Azerbaijan is the senior-most band in the armed forces. Being such, it serves as a type of presidential band, performing at all ceremonies involving the President of Azerbaijan. This includes state visits, opening ceremonies and base visits. Preparation for these events generally takes three to four days for the band. The President of Afghanistan Ashraf Ghani and Israeli Prime Minister Benjamin Netanyahu have given their own personal greetings to members of the band. It has also performed for dignitaries such as Russian President Vladimir Putin, Pope Francis and Iranian leader Hassan Rouhani. It has visited 50 countries. It is notable for organizing its performances without notes, but through memorization. In November 2019, soloists of the band represented Azerbaijan at the Katyusha Military-Music Festival in Moscow dedicated to the 75th anniversary of the victory in World War II.

It is the only military orchestra in the Commonwealth of Independent States to be led by a general.

==== Band of the Azerbaijan Higher Military Academy ====
The Band of the Azerbaijan Higher Military Academy is a 52-member military band that serves as part of the Azerbaijan Higher Military Academy (AAHA). The band was formed on 15 February 1992 and is one of the leading military ensembles in Azerbaijan. In August 2019, the academy military band, led by Colonel Ekhtibar Aliyev and Major Fariz Mamedzade, took part in the Spasskaya Tower Military Music Festival and Tattoo, representing Azerbaijan for the first time.

==== Band of the Internal Troops ====
The Band of the Internal Troops of Azerbaijan is the official military band of the Internal Troops. Currently, the band has 115 members and includes song and dance ensemble. On 17 November 1994, the General Directorate of Internal Troops of the Ministry of Internal Affairs ordered the establishment of the band. The current artistic director is Lieutenant Colonel Ilgar Novruzov, a graduate of the Baku Music Conservatory. He is also the author and composer of the anthem of the Internal Troops.

=== Band staffing ===
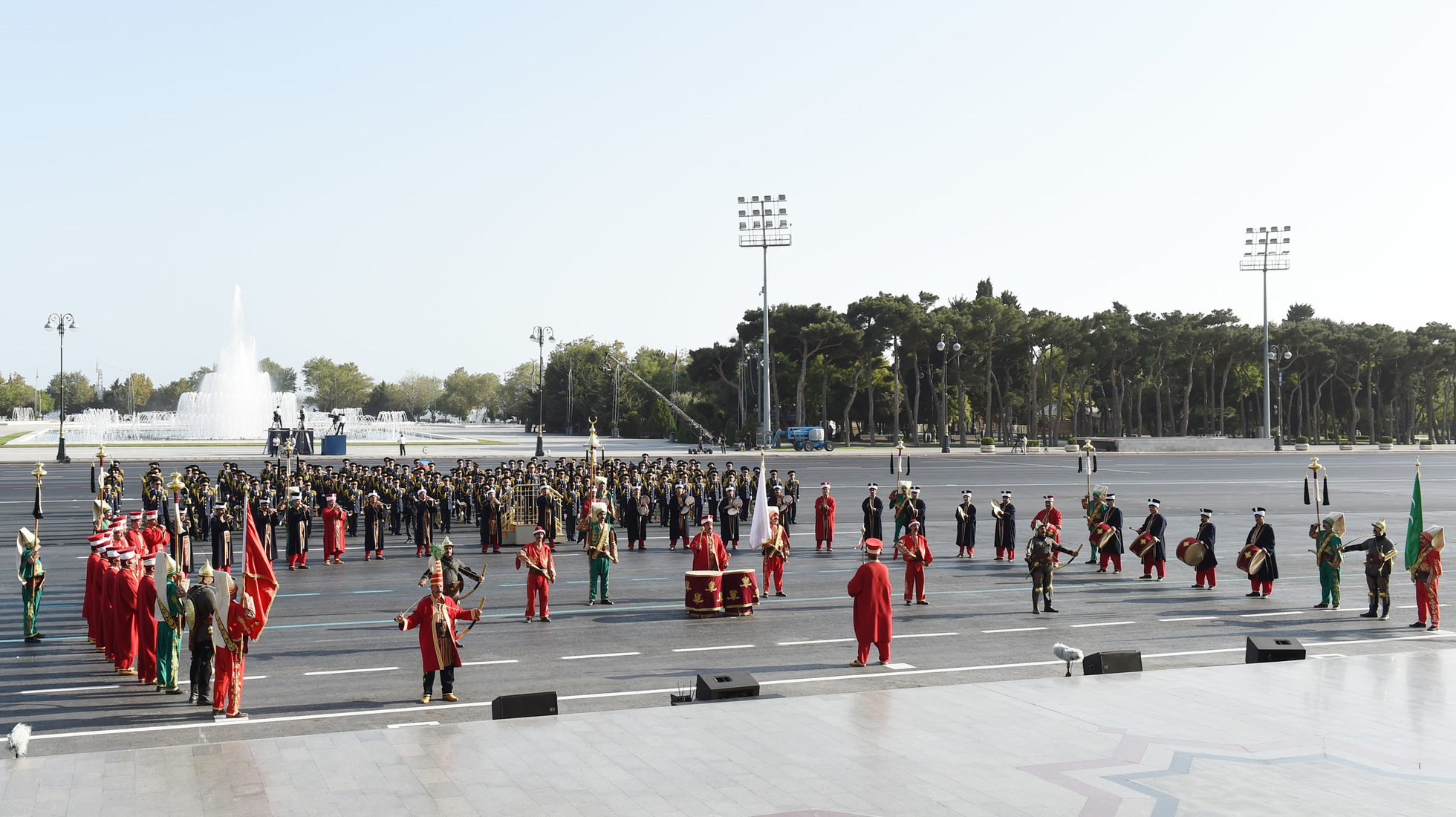
The massed bands with the historical interpretation of an Ottoman military band during the parade in honor of the 100th anniversary of the liberation of Baku

The training of military conductors is provided by a class at the Hajibeyov Baku Academy of Music, providing the basis for the development of military bands. There are also many civilians in Azeri military bands.

== Performances and characteristics ==
In recent years, military bands have been performing in Baku on significant dates: Victory Day (9 May), Heydar Aliyev's birthday (10 May), and Republic Day (28 May).

The combined band of the service (usually 170-members) have taken part in the parades in honor of the 90th, 93rd, 95th, and 100th anniversary of the Azerbaijani Armed Forces as well as organized performances in various parts of Baku on the Day of the Armed Forces of Azerbaijan. In June 2017, the Band of the Defense Ministry performed with the Salamanca Band of the Rifles at the Azerbaijan State Philharmonic Hall. In September 2018, it performed for presidents Ilham Aliyev and Recep Tayyip Erdogan in honor of the 100th anniversary of the Liberation of Baku. At around the same time, a CD was released by the Exemplary Band that includes a number of military marches performed by the band and its soloists. In August 2019, the higher military academy band took part in the Spasskaya Tower Military Music Festival and Tattoo, representing Azerbaijan for the first time.

The band retains features from Russian and Turkish military bands in their repertoire and their marching style.

=== Uniform ===
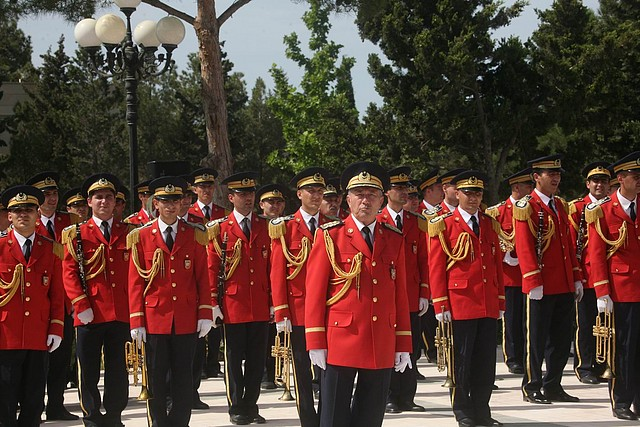
Musicians of the band in their scarlet uniform.

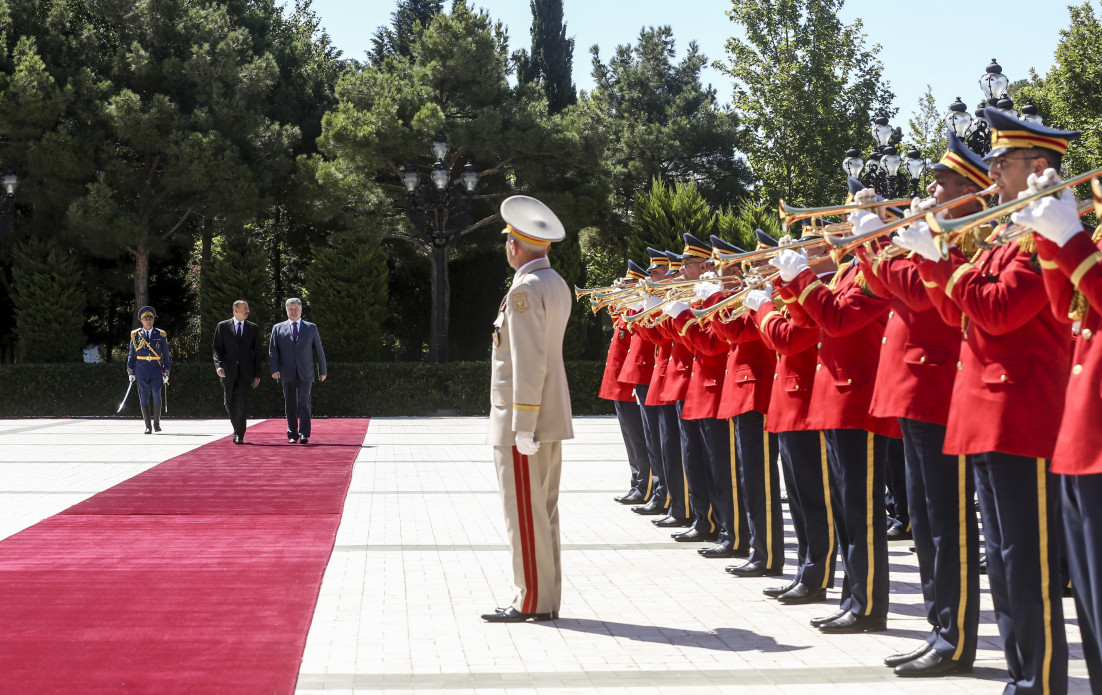
The Band of the Ministry of Defense, with its director in its white uniform, during the state visit of Petro Poroshenko in Azerbaijan, July 2016.

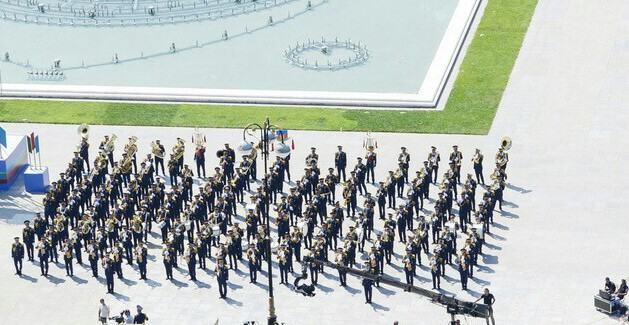
The massed bands in their blue uniform.

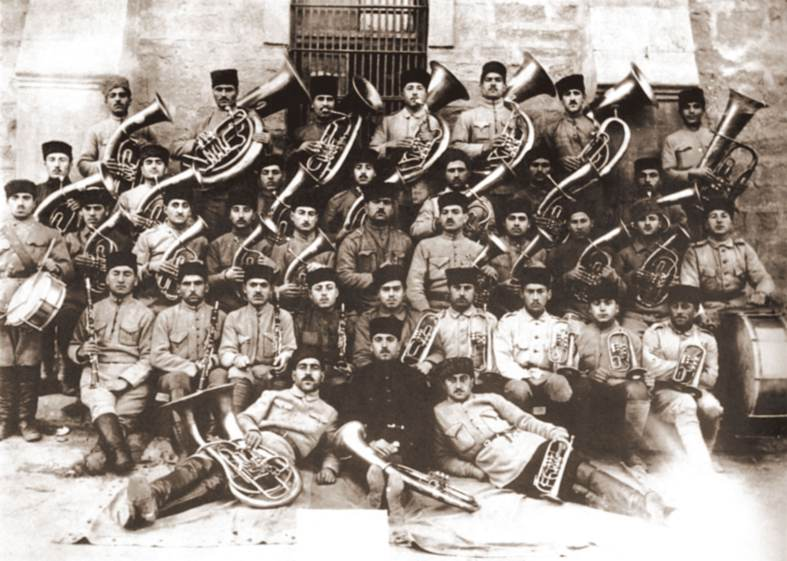
Members of the military band of the Azerbaijan Democratic Republic wearing their Papakha hats.

=== Repertoire ===
The service's repertoire includes modified pieces from famous Azerbaijani composers, including Said Rustamov and Emin Sabitoglu.The following marches are in the repertoire of the band:

- March "Vətən" (Alimərdan Aliyev)
- Azadlıq Marşı (Elchin Mirzabeyli)
- Qarşılama marşı (Həsənağa Abasquliyev)
- March "Sumgait" (Qulu Aliyev)
- March "Azərbaycan ordusu" (Eldar Mansurov)
- March "Sıravi Əhməd" (Emin Sabitoglu)
- Qələbə Marşı (Rufat Akhundzade)

== See also ==
- Military Band Service of the Armed Forces of Russia
