= Zakir Hasanov =

Defence Minister of Azerbaijan

- Zakir Həsənov
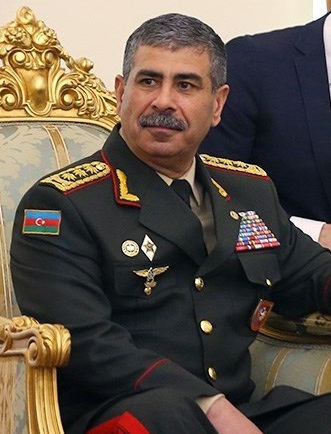
- Hasanov in 2017

Minister of Defence
- Incumbent
- Assumed office 22 October 2013
- President: Ilham Aliyev
- Preceded by: Safar Abiyev

Deputy Minister of Internal Affairs Commander of Internal Troops
- In office 17 January 2003 – 22 October 2013
- President: Ilham Aliyev
- Minister: Ramil Usubov

Personal details
- Born: 6 June 1959 (age 67) Astara District, Azerbaijan SSR, Soviet Union (now Azerbaijan)
- Education: Jamshid Nakhchivanski Military Lyceum; Baku Higher Combined Arms Command School
- Profession: Politician, Minister Of Defense

Military service
- Allegiance: Soviet Union; Azerbaijan
- Branch/service: Soviet Army; Azerbaijani Land Forces
- Years of service: 1980–present
- Rank: Colonel General
- Battles/wars: First Nagorno-Karabakh War Second Nagorno-Karabakh War

Zakir Asger oghlu Hasanov (Azerbaijani: Zakir Əsgər oğlu Həsənov; born 6 June 1959) is an Azerbaijani politician and colonel general who has been the Minister of Defence of Azerbaijan since 2013.

== Early life and military career ==
He was born on 6 June 1959 in the Astara District. In 1976 he graduated from the Jamshid Nakhchivanski Military Lyceum. He graduated from the Baku High Army Commanders School in 1980 as an artillery officer before serving for five years in the Soviet Armed Forces Units in East Germany. Afterwards, he spent the next eight years at the Altay military registration and enlistment office of the Siberian Military District as part of the Ministry of Defence of the USSR. In 1987, he graduated from the academic courses of the Military Academy of the General Staff of the Armed Forces of the USSR.

== Military career in Azerbaijan ==
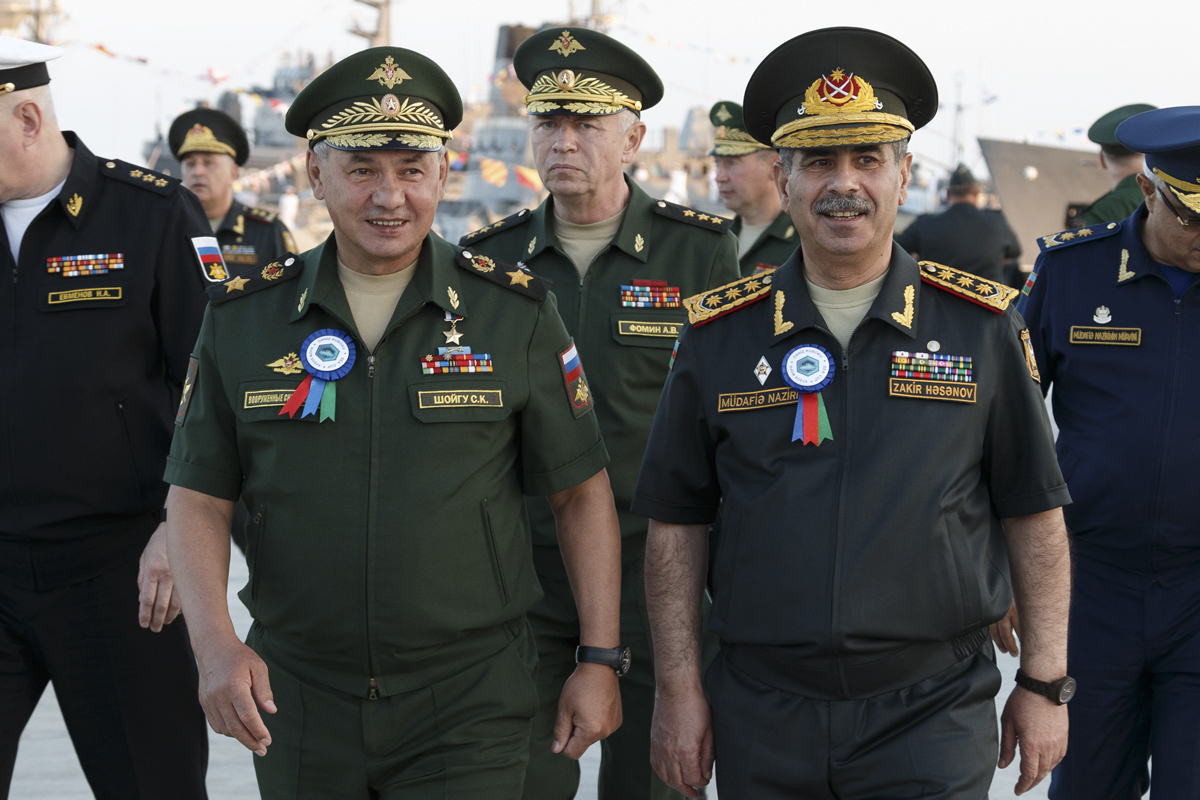
Hasanov (right) and Russian Defence Minister Sergey Shoygu (left) during the opening ceremony of the Sea Cup competition of the International Army Games.

Following the fall of the Soviet Union, he served for a decade in the Border Troops of the Ministry of National Security of Azerbaijan. He was then promoted to the chief of office of international relations of the State Border Service before being appointed Deputy Minister of Interior and Commander of the Internal Troops by a presidential decree on 17 January 2003, when he was also promoted to the rank of major-general four months later.

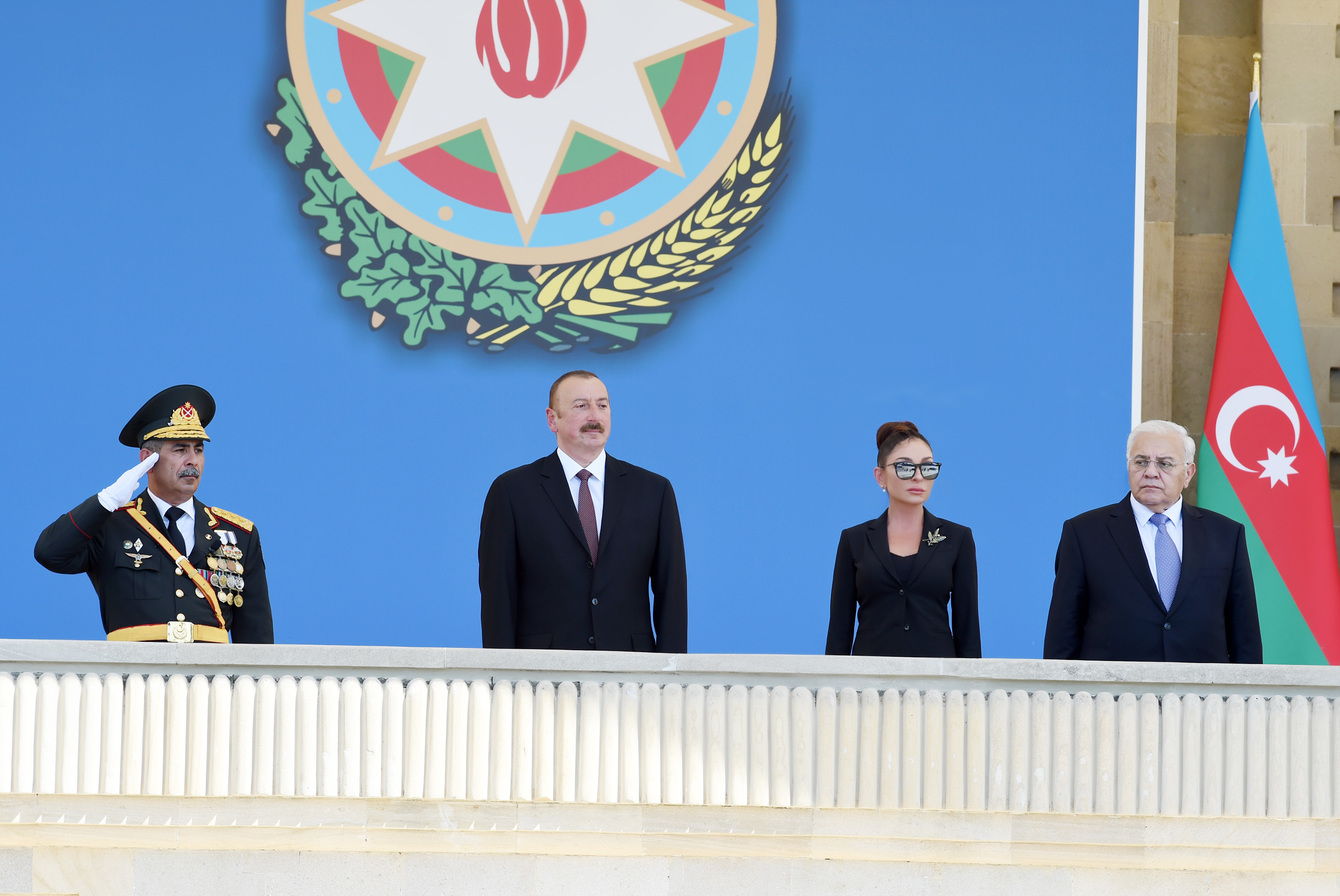
Hasanov (far left) during a military parade in honor of the Day of the Armed Forces of Azerbaijan in 2018.

He was previously the Deputy Minister of Internal Affairs.

== Defence Minister ==
=== Nagorno-Karabakh Conflict ===
Upon coming into office as the Minister of Defence, he made statements in regard to the Nagorno-Karabakh conflict. This included saying that the Azerbaijani army was strong and disciplined as opposed to that of Armenia and that "the situation in the Armenian armed forces is disastrous. In case of war the troops of this country will escape from the field of battle." He also told the European Union that his country would support liberating its lands peacefully but he emphasized that Azerbaijan reserves the right to liberate "its occupied lands". This came at the same time as E.U. Special Representative for the South Caucasus Philippe Lefort congratulated him on his appointment.

During the 2016 April War, Hasanov stated that if shelling of Azerbaijani settlements by Armenian forces did not cease, Azerbaijan would consider launching an artillery bombardment on Stepanakert. In April 2019, Hasanov warned that "If Armenians go on the offensive, it will give me the opportunity to meet with him Armenian Defence Minister David Tonoyan in Yerevan", implying an armed incursion.

=== Representative functions ===
In October 2017, a garrison military parade of the Nakhchivan Garrison was held through the capital of the Nakhchivan Autonomous Republic in honor of the 25th anniversary of the establishment of the first military unit of the National Army, being attended by Defense Minister Hasanov on behalf of the national government. He commanded the Day of the Armed Forces and Liberation Day parades on Azadliq Square in June and September 2018, with the latter commemorating the centennial of the Battle of Baku. Hasanov represented Azerbaijan at the 2019 Pakistan Day Parade in Islamabad. On 2 July 2019, on the instruction of President Aliyev, a delegation led by Hasanov visited Kima Davidovich (the mother of Belarusian-Azerbaijani soldier Anatoly Nikolayevich Davidovich) while she was being treated in a clinical hospital in Minsk, on the eve of his attendance at the celebrations in honor of the 75th anniversary of the Minsk Offensive. Due to the COVID-19 pandemic, he represented President Aliyev at the 2020 Moscow Victory Day Parade on Red Square.

== Personal life ==
He is married with three children. He is fluent in German, English, Russian and Turkish.

== Awards ==
=== Orders and medals ===
- Medal for Distinguished Service in Defending the State Borders – 1998
- Medal for Distinguished Military Service – 2002
- Azerbaijani Flag Order – 2004
- Medal for Distinguished Service for Fatherland – 2008
- Azerbaijani Flag – 2016
- Shohrat Order – 2019
- Zafar Order – 2020

=== Ranks ===
- Major General (2003)
- Lieutenant General (2005)
- Colonel General (2013)

Political offices
Preceded by Safar Abiyev	Minister of Defence; 2013–present	Incumbent
