= Azerbaijan Higher Naval Academy =

Coordinates: 40°20′39″N 49°58′00″E

The official logo

The Azerbaijan Higher Naval Academy (Azerbaijani: Azərbaycan Ali Hərbi Dənizçilik Məktəbi) is an educational institution of the Azerbaijani Naval Forces. It is part of the education system of the Ministry of Defense of Azerbaijan. It was originally founded in 1939, during Soviet times, when it was called the Kirov Naval Academy. (Note: Caspian Higher Naval Red Banner School named after Sergei Kirov (Russian: Каспийское высшее военно-морское Краснознамённое училище имени С. М. Кирова, romanized: Kaspiyskoye vyssheye voyenno-morskoye Krasnoznamyonnoye uchilishche imeni S. M. Kirova))

== History ==
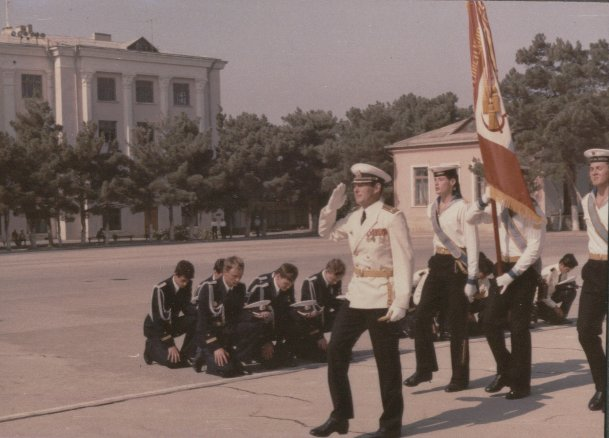
Graduates (on bended knees) of the 1989 class of officers from the Volksmarine during the ceremony to receive the diploma on the central square of the naval school.

The school was founded on 9 December 1939 in Baku. On 4 March 1945, on behalf of the Presidium of the Supreme Soviet, the school was awarded the Battle Banner of the school. Fifteen years after the original founding date, the school was named after Sergei Mironovich Kirov. On 22 February 1968, the school was awarded the Order of the Red Banner. During Yusif Akhundzade's service as director of the school band, it participated in the 1971 and 1983 October Revolution Day Parade on Moscow's Red Square. In June 1992, the last issue of cadets took place. After the collapse of the USSR, by decree of President Abulfaz Elchibey on 3 July 1992, the school was transferred to the jurisdiction of the newly formed Azerbaijani Republic. This order became official on 18 July 1992, after which the school was disbanded by directive of the General Staff of the Navy on 10 September 1992, and the personnel was transferred to other naval schools of Russia. At the same time, most officers and cadets of the navigational faculty continued to serve and study at the Frunze Higher Naval School. On the basis of the school, the Azerbaijan Higher Naval School was created in 1996. Since 2008, cadets from the Kazakh Naval Forces have studied at the school, specializing in naval weapons. By presidential decree of 24 December 2015, the school was abolished and transferred to the Azerbaijan Higher Military Academy with the establishment of the corresponding faculties there.

== School superintendents ==
- Division Commander Georgy Burichenkov (June 1939–April 1940)
- Captain Konstantin Sukhiashvili (April 1940–November 1941)
- Rear Admiral Nikolai Zuykov (November 1941–August 1942)
- Rear Admiral Konstantin Sukhiashvili (August 1942–June 1944)
- Rear Admiral Ivan Golubev-Monatkin (June 1944–April 1949)
- Vice Admiral Alexander Vanifatiev (April 1949–March 1951)
- Rear Admiral Semen Ramishvili (March 1951–November 1961)
- Rear Admiral Nikolai Drozdov (November 1961–February 1963)
- Rear Admiral Fedor Akimov (February 1963–September 1966)
- Rear Admiral Georgy Timchenko (February 1967–October 1970)
- Vice Admiral Georgy Stepanov (October 1970–June 1974)
- Rear Admiral Yevgeny Glebov (June 1974–December 1975)
- Vice Admiral Vasily Arkhipov (December 1975–November 1985)
- Rear Admiral Albert Akatov (November 1985–July 1987)
- Vice Admiral Leonid Zhdanov (July 1987–July 1992)
- Rear Admiral Eduard Huseynov (1992–1993)
- Captain 1st rank Dzhan-Mirza Mirzoev (1993–1995)
- Captain 1st Rank Nurulla Aliev (1995–2010)
- Captain 1st Rank Fikret Melikov (2010–2015)

== Notable alumni ==
=== Heroes of the Soviet Union ===
- Lev Zhiltsov
- Viktor Leonov
- Vladimir Chernavin
- Aleksandr Shabalin

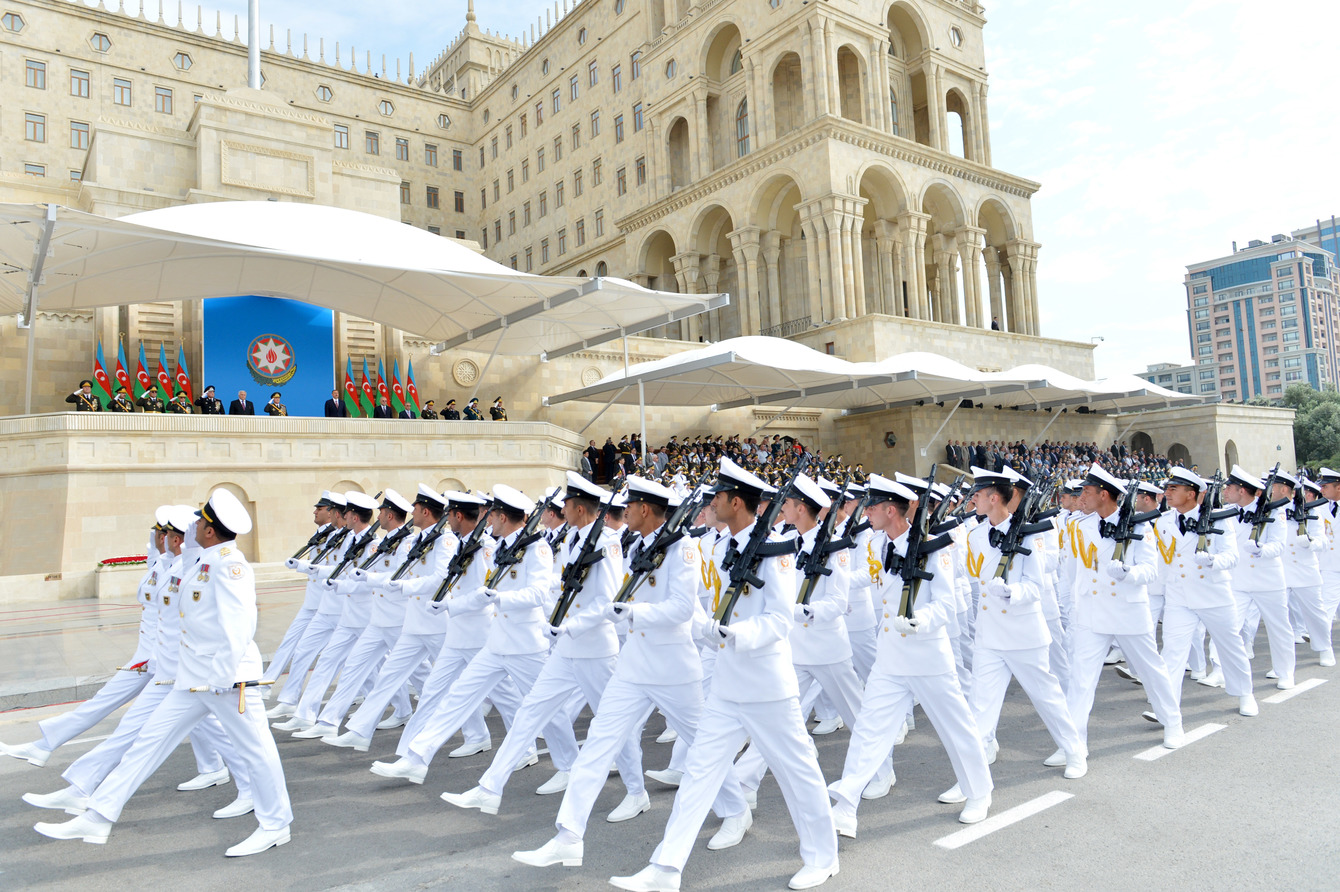
Members of the academy during a Day of the Armed Forces parade in 2013.

=== Recipients of other rewards ===
- German Ugryumov (Hero of the Russian Federation)
- Ali Aliyev (Hero of Abkhazia)

=== Other people ===
- Vagharshak Harutiunyan, Defence Minister of Armenia from 11 June 1999 until 20 May 2000.
- Ivan Kapitanets, admiral of the fleet who served in the Soviet Navy.
- Abdullah Ali Mujawar Ruweis, former Commander of the Yemeni Navy
- Hijran Rustamzade, former acting Azerbaijan Navy commander
- Zamina Khinali, Chairwoman of the Women's Council at the Azerbaijan Higher Naval School (1996–2001)
- Ndue Jaku, Commander-in-Chief of Albanian Naval Combat Fleet (1979–1991)
- Vice Admiral Vasily Arkhipov, known for preventing a nuclear war during the Cuban Missile Crisis (1962)
- Samuel Hlongwane, Chief of the South African Navy.

== See also ==
- Azerbaijan State Marine Academy
- Nakhimov Naval Academy (Sevastopol)
