= Day of the Armed Forces of Azerbaijan =

Azerbaijani holiday on June 26

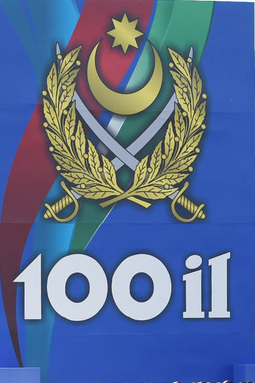
- The logo in honor of the 100th anniversary of the Armed Forces of Azerbaijan.
- Observed by: Azerbaijan
- Type: National
- Celebrations: Fireworks, Concerts, Parades
- Date: June 26
- Next time: 26 June 2027
- Frequency: annual

Day of the Armed Forces of Azerbaijan (Azerbaijani: Azərbaycan Respublikası Silahlı Qüvvələri günü) is a holiday annually celebrated on June 26 in Azerbaijan, by the decree issued by President Heydar Aliyev, to commemorate the Azerbaijani Armed Forces.

== Prehistory ==
On June 26, 1918 a Muslim Corps, established by a decision of the Special Transcaucasian Committee, was renamed to Detached Corps of Azerbaijan with the establishment of the Azerbaijan Democratic Republic. Military Ministry of Azerbaijan Democratic Republic was established on August 1, 1918. On December 25, General Samad bey Mehmandarov was elected as a Minister of Defense and Lieutenant-General – Ali-Agha Shikhlinski as a Deputy Minister of Defense. After the collapse of the ADR existing for only 23 months, the Bolshevik government abolished the National Army of Azerbaijan. The first military parade in Azerbaijan was held in Baku in 1919 in the area of the current Museum Center. According to the agreement signed with Turkey, the Islamic Army of the Caucasus, led by Nuru Pasha, closely participated in the forming Azerbaijan army. The Azerbaijani defense together with the Caucasian Islamic Army released Baku and nearby areas from the Bolshevik-Dashnak occupation on September 15, 1918. At that time, the Azerbaijani army had generals such as Huseyn khan Nakhchivanski, Ibrahim agha Usubov, Abdulhamid bey Gaytabashi, Kazim Gajar, Javad bay Shikhlinski, Habib bey Salimov.

From its first days sub-units of the Azerbaijani Army fought against illegally formed armed forces of Armenia in hard battles throughout the all territory of the country. The Azerbaijani Army became a secure guarantee of independence of the Republic and its people, who made a choice to establish a democratic government.

After 1991, with the country's independence now regained, the newly restored national government began to form the Azerbaijani armed forces on the basis of Soviet formations of the Transcaucasian Military District within Azerbaijan.

== Legislative basis ==
On October 9, 1991, the Supreme Soviet of Azerbaijan passed a law "On the Establishment of the Armed Forces of Azerbaijan. This was considered the birthday of the Armed Forces of modern Azerbaijan. On May 22, 1998 according to Decree No. 707 issued by Heydar Aliyev, the President of the Republic of Azerbaijan, after gaining the independence for the second time, this historical day – June 26 was declared the Day of the Armed Forces of Azerbaijan, which is annually celebrated by the Azerbaijani people and is the nonworking day.

== Summary of commemorations ==
=== Jubilee military parade and parade history ===
Azadliq Square, Baku is the main venue for the bi-annual parade held every 5 to 3 years, on the important anniversary years of the Armed Forces and the Republic (the anniversary years of the formation of the Armed Forces and the First Republic, and the anniversary year of the restoration of Azeri independence). The parade is one of the biggest in the former Soviet Union.

The guest of honor is the President of Azerbaijan in his constitutional role as Supreme Commander of the Armed Forces, and at around 10am as the massed bands of the Military Band Service of the Armed Forces of Azerbaijan sounds a fanfare, he arrives at a special tribune at Government House, Baku, to receive the salute of the parade assembled led by the Minister of Defense, as well as of his report informing him of the readiness of the contingents assembled. At the stands are veterans, active duty personnel of the armed forces, and employees of the civil service. The parade having presented arms at this point, following the greeting of the President to the assembled formations, the band then plays Azərbaycan marşı. As the band ends playing the anthem the President then delivers his holiday address to the people and the men and women of the armed services. Following the address, the parade commander (holding the billet of a lieutenant general) orders the parade to begin its march past in quick time in the following manner:

Parade... weapons on shoulders! To the solemn march!
With divisions! Distance by a single lineman! First division stand still, the rest... right.. turn!
Look rightwards. Step by step.... march!

As the command is given to start the linemen take their places and the field markers also as well at the south end of the square. Following the command the parade ground column marks time as a drum cadence is played and to the tune of the massed bands marches past the tribune, first up, led by a colour guard and then followed by the Drum and Bugle Corps of the Jamshid Nakhchivanski Military Lyceum. The parade also includes a fleet review.

On October 9, 1992, first military parade in the history of independent Azerbaijan took place in honor of Armed Forces Day on Baku's Azadliq Square. The parade was presided by Defense Minister Rahim Gaziyev and General Nuraddin Sadigov. It was the only Azerbaijani military parade to follow the Soviet format that included the inspection of troops and the three-fold Oorah. Preparations for the parade took less than a month and included two companies serving in the area of hostilities, which immediately after the parade returned to Nagorno-Karabakh. During the parade in Nakhchivan, future president Heydar Aliyev said the following: "Every year for 70 years, we have participated in the celebrations of the armed forces of the former Soviet Union. But today's holiday is a source of great pride in the heart of each of us. We are in great joy. Because the people of Azerbaijan have finally created a national army to defend their state, their nation, their homeland".

The first parade since was held on 90th anniversary of the Azerbaijani Armed Forces. Another parade held in 2011 dedicated to the 20th anniversary of Azerbaijan's independence and the 93rd anniversary of the Azerbaijani Armed Forces. It was attended by about 6,000 soldiers and about 400 units of military equipment and weapons, including 14 armored vehicles, 35 combat helicopters, and 28 ships. It was commanded by Minister of Defense Colonel General Safar Abiyev. The 2013 parade was dedicated to the 95th anniversary of the Azerbaijani Armed Forces, with over 5,000 personnel of various military units were involved in the military parade.

The parade of 2018 was dedicated to the 100th anniversary of the Azerbaijani Armed Forces. The design of the parade was changed to mirror that of the parade held in Nakhchivan in October 2017. The jubilee parade saw for the first time, a color guard being opened with the banners of 5 units that reclaimed territory in the 2016 April War and the Gyunnut Operation. A formation of personnel from the Turkish Land Forces led by Captain Goja Arsoy took part in the parade for the first time as well as a group of Turkish F-16 fighter jets. The Azerbaijani Air Force's Bell-412, Mi-24, Mi-24G, Mi-35M attack helicopters, and Mi-17 military transport helicopters took part in the fly past at the end of the parade. Nearly 100 military delegations from Turkey, Pakistan (Chairman Joint Chiefs of Staff Committee Zubair Mahmood Hayat), Belarus (Defence Minister Andrei Ravkov), Bahrain, the United Arab Emirates, Georgia, Iran (Defence Minister Amir Hatami), Israel, Kazakhstan, Uzbekistan (Defence Minister Abdusalom Azizov), Russia, Saudi Arabia and Ukraine attended the parade. The parade was commanded by Minister of Defense, Colonel General Zakir Hasanov and the Deputy Defence Minister Lieutenant General Ayaz Hasanov.

=== Unit celebrations ===
The 95th anniversary was also celebrated in Ganja with a parade of the "N" Military Unit held in the city center. Unit commander Munasib Babayev read a congratulatory letter from Defense Minister Abiyev to the servicemen and Deputy Mayor of Ganja Mikayil Zeynalov awarded honorary diplomas and gifts from the Ganja City Executive Power to the participating servicemen.

=== Other events ===
In 2014, joint operational and tactical exercises of the formations and units of the Ministry of Defense, Internal Troops and the State Border Service were held on the occasion of the 96th anniversary of the establishment of the Armed Forces.

In 2021, President Ilham Aliyev met with a group of leaders and personnel of the Azerbaijani Army at the Gulustan Palace on the occasion of Armed Forces Day.

== Gallery ==
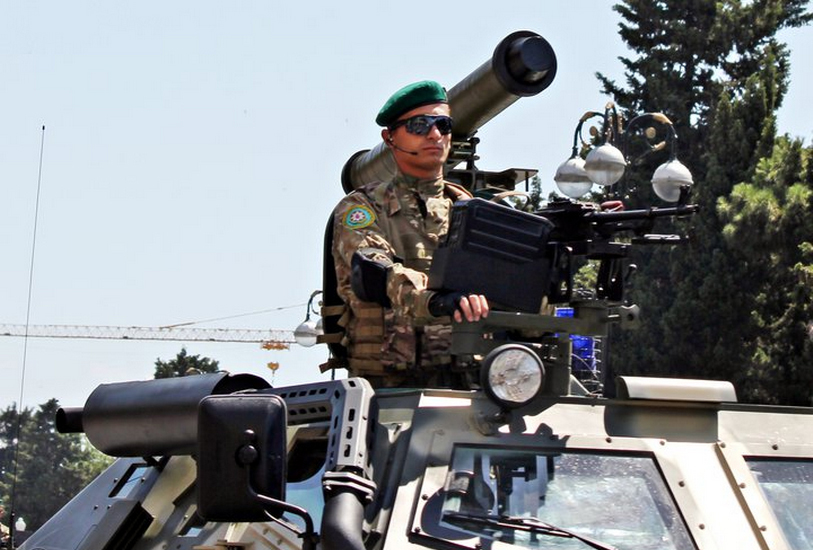
Military hardware.

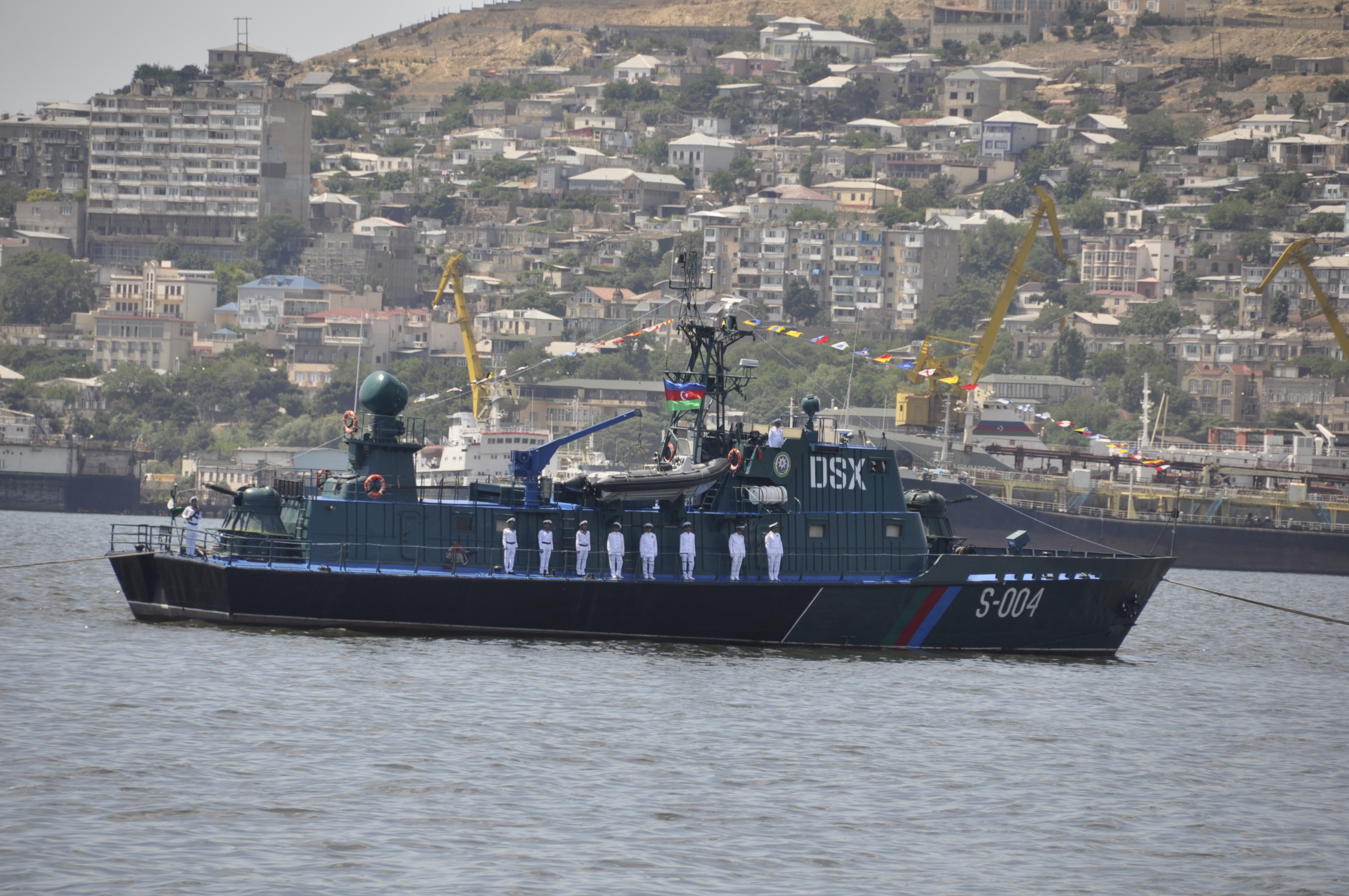
Ships of the Azerbaijani Navy

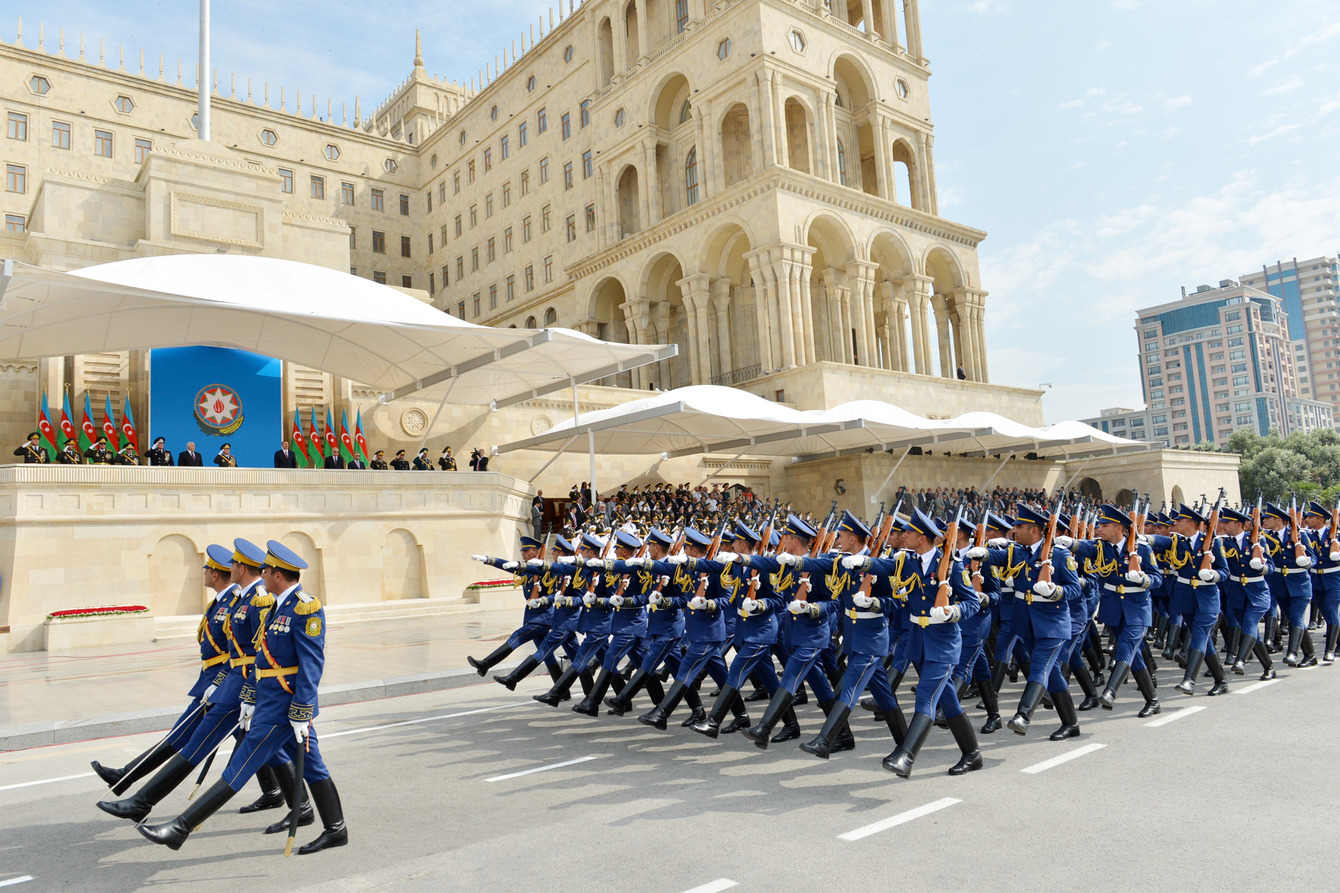
National Guard of Azerbaijan

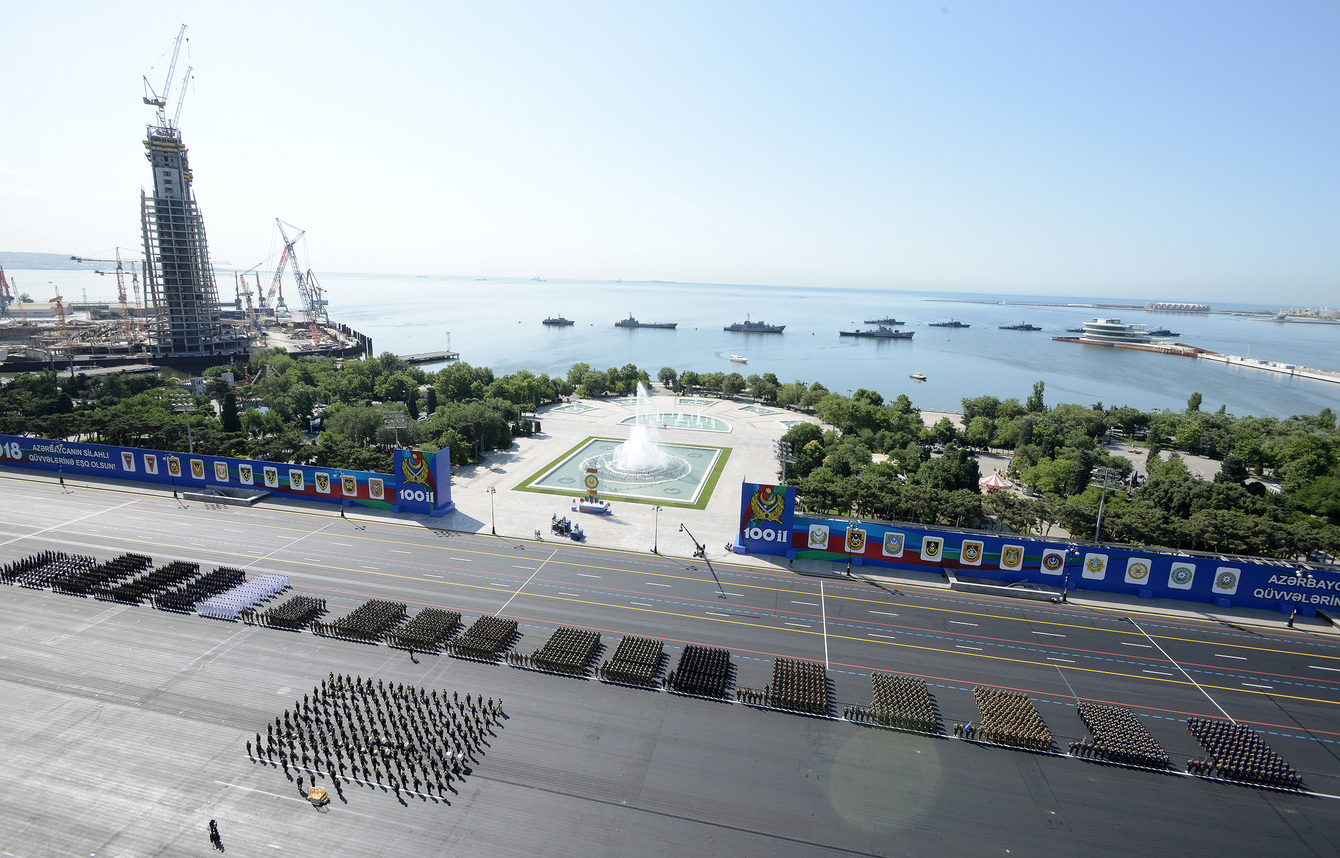
Troops on Azadliq Square.

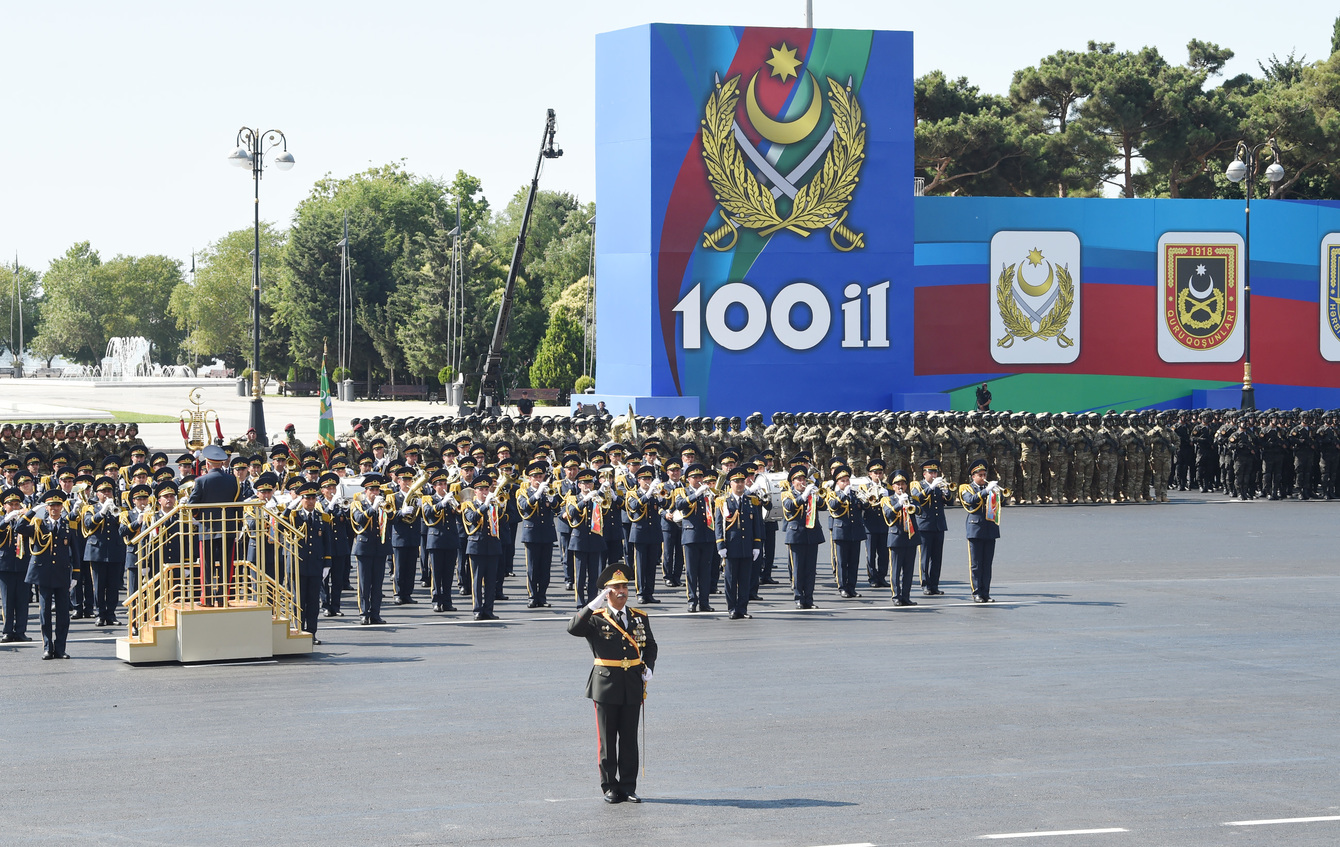
Defence Minister Zakir Hasanov

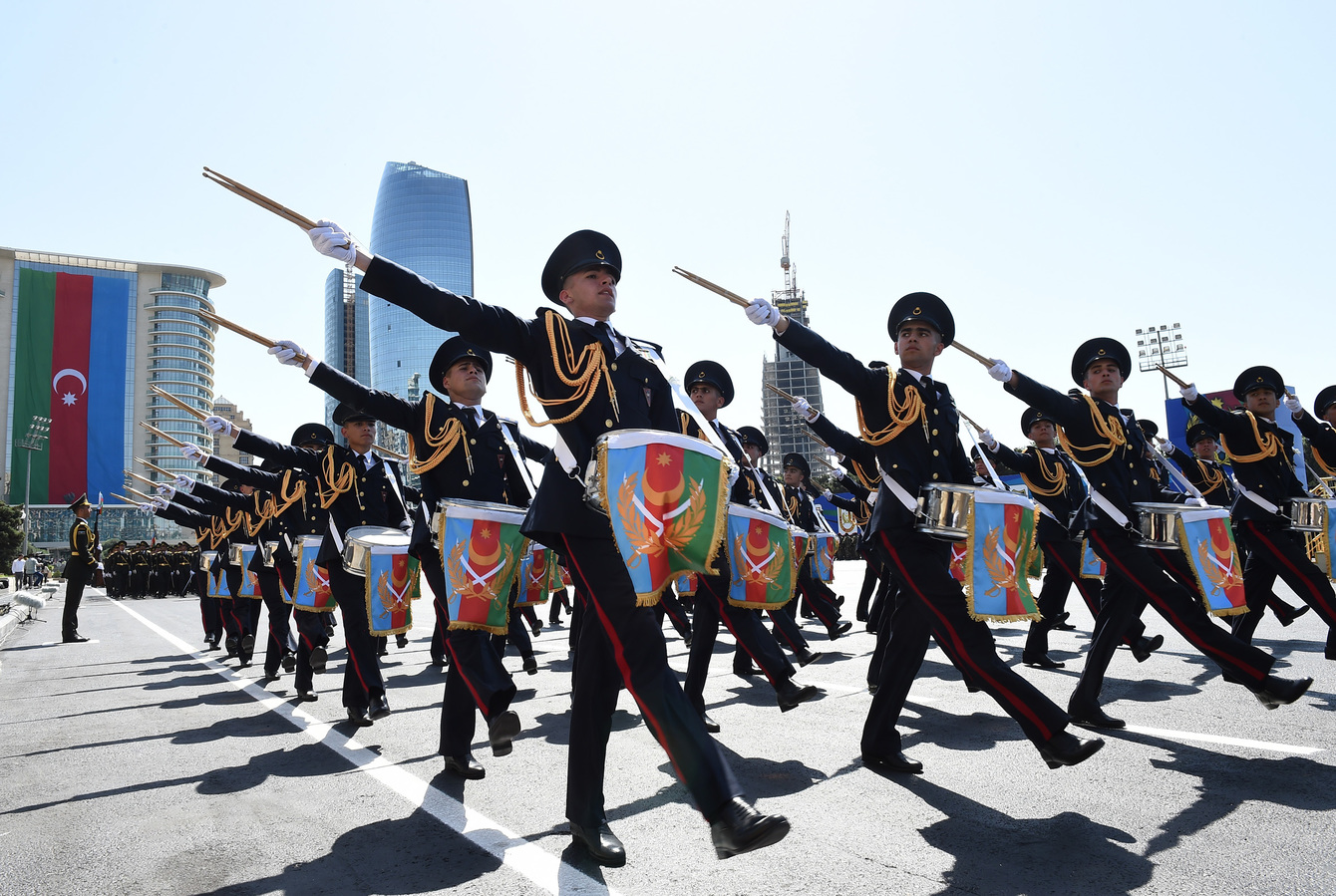
Cadets of the military lyceum

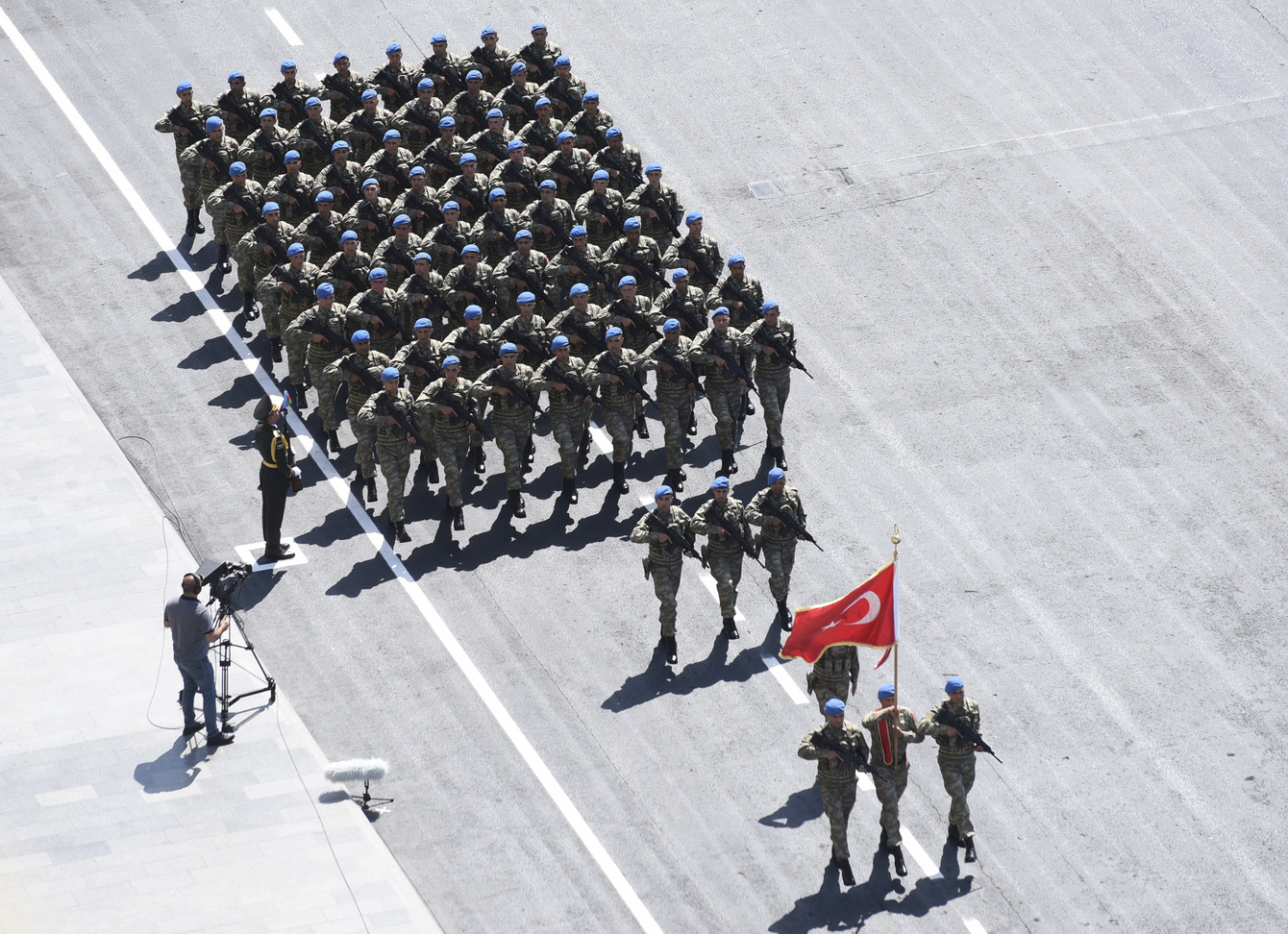
Forces of the Turkish Armed Forces

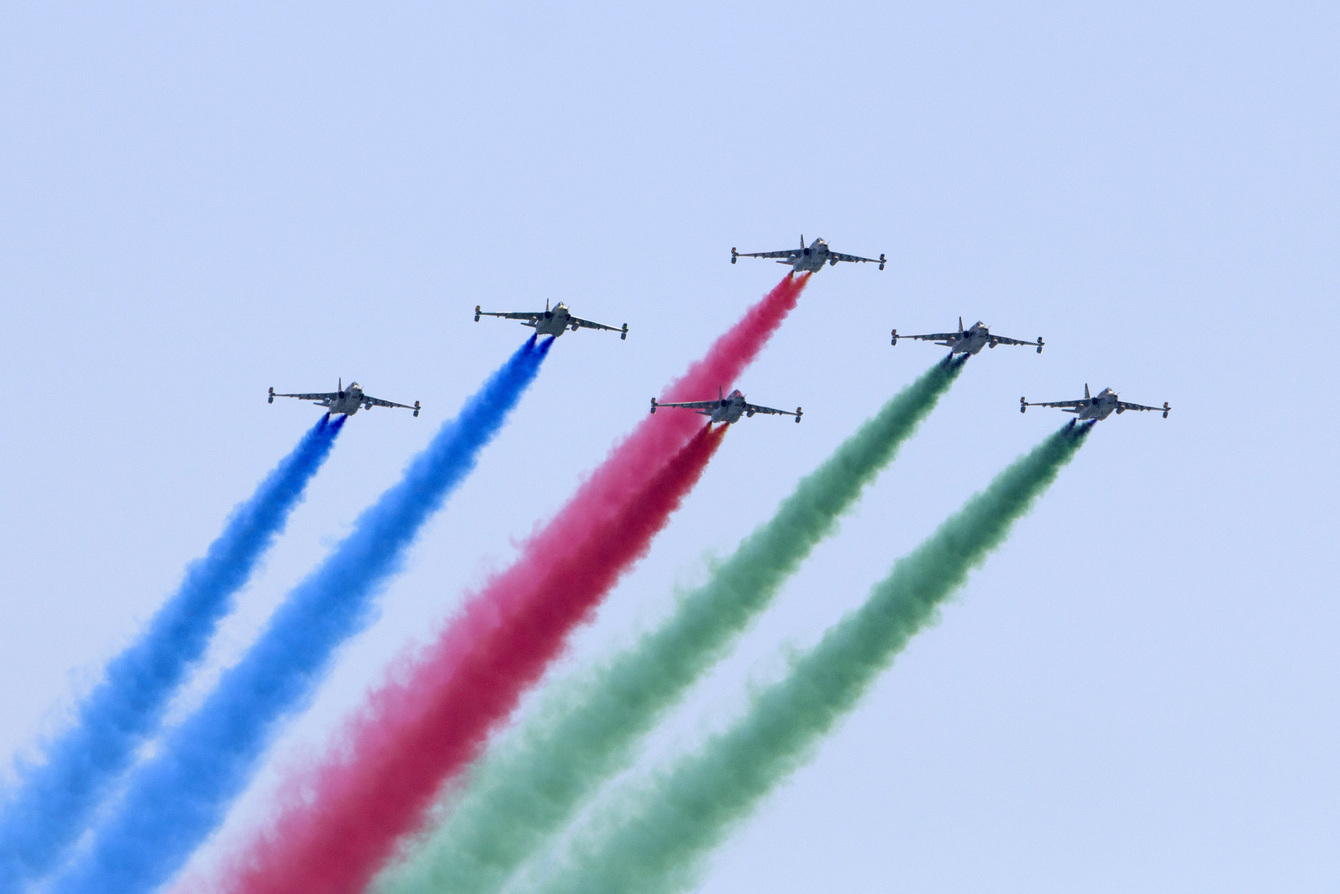
Flypast of the Azerbaijani Air Forces.
