= Lachin offensive =

Offensive in the Second Nagorno-Karabakh War

- Part of the Second Nagorno-Karabakh War
Date	23 October 2020 – 10 November 2020 (2 weeks and 4 days)
Location	Armenian-occupied territories surrounding Nagorno-Karabakh, Armenia–Azerbaijan border
Result	Azerbaijani victory
Territorial changes	Azerbaijani forces take control of large chunks of Qubadli District, including its administrative center, and some parts of Lachin District

Belligerents
Azerbaijan	Artsakh; Armenia

Commanders and leaders
Mais Barkhudarov; Elchin Guliyev; Shukur Hamidov †; Yashar Hasanov; Zaur Guliyev	Unknown

Units involved
Azerbaijani Armed Forces: 2nd Corps; Azerbaijani Navy; Marine Infantry Battalion; State Border Service; Foreign Intelligence Service: YARASA Special Forces	Artsakh Defence Army; Armed Forces of Armenia; National Security Service

Strength
Unknown regular military Units: Unknown number of Bayraktar TB2; Unknown number of IAI Harop; Unknown number of Orbiter 1K	Unknown regular military

Casualties and losses
Per Azerbaijan: The Azerbaijani army lost 173 soldiers in Qubadli, 58 soldiers in Lachin; Per Armenia: Unspecified	Per Armenia: Unspecified; Per Azerbaijan: Unspecified number of servicemen killed; Units: 3 combat aircraft downed

The Lachin offensive (Note: In Azerbaijan, it has been referred to as Battle over Lachin (Azerbaijani: Laçın uğrunda döyüşlər).) (Azerbaijani: Laçına hücum əməliyyatı) was a military operation launched by Azerbaijan against the unrecognized Republic of Artsakh and their Armenian allies along the Armenia–Azerbaijan border during the Second Nagorno-Karabakh War, with the suspected goal of taking control of the Lachin corridor. The offensive began in mid-October, when the Azerbaijani forces advanced into Qubadlı and Laçın Districts after capturing Zəngilan. On 25 October, the Azerbaijani forces seized control of the city of Qubadlı.

== Background ==
The disputed region of Nagorno-Karabakh, with its ethnic Armenian majority, is a de jure part of Azerbaijan, but is de facto held by the self-proclaimed Republic of Artsakh, which is supported by Armenia. Ethnic violence began in the late 1980s, and exploded into a war following the dissolution of the USSR in 1991. On 20 February 1988, the Soviet of the Nagorno-Karabakh Autonomous Oblast passed a resolution requesting transfer of the oblast from the Azerbaijan SSR to the Armenia SSR; Azerbaijan rejected the request. Following the revoking of Nagorno-Karabakh's autonomous status, an independence referendum was held on 10 December 1991 which was boycotted by the Azerbaijani population which then constituted around 22.8% of Nagorno-Karabakh's population; as a result, 99.8% voted in favor. Both Armenia and Azerbaijan then became fully independent of the Soviet Union in 1992.

The First Nagorno-Karabakh War resulted in the displacement of 750,000 Azerbaijanis overall, with roughly 600,000 of them being from Nagorno-Karabakh and the seven surrounding districts, which were majority-Azeri, essentially cleansing all of the occupied territories from its Azerbaijani inhabitants. Similarly, 353,000 Armenians had to flee from Azerbaijan. The war ended with a ceasefire in 1994, with the unrecognised Republic of Artsakh in control of most of the Nagorno-Karabakh region, as well as occupying the surrounding districts of Agdam, Jabrayil, Fuzuli, Kalbajar, Qubadli, Lachin and Zangilan of Azerbaijan and the Lachin Corridor - a mountain pass that links Nagorno-Karabakh with mainland Armenia.

For almost three decades, multiple violations of the ceasefire have occurred, the most serious incidents prior to the current conflict being the 2016 Nagorno-Karabakh clashes. Long-standing international mediation attempts to create a peace process were initiated by the OSCE Minsk Group in 1994, with the interrupted Madrid Principles being the most recent iteration. While it is unclear how the present inhabitants of the area want to administer the territory, surveys indicate that they do not want to be part of Azerbaijan. In August 2019, in an unprecedented declaration in favour of unification, the Armenian Prime Minister, Nikol Pashinyan, visited Nagorno-Karabakh, stating, "Artsakh is Armenia, full stop".

Skirmishes occurred on the border between Armenia and Azerbaijan in July 2020. Thousands of Azerbaijanis demonstrated for war to retake the occupied territories in response, with Turkey increasing its support of Azerbaijan.

The Azerbaijani forces started operations along the Aras River on 27 September, with advancements in Jabrayil and Fuzuli districts, and the initial objective to seize control of Cəbrayıl and Füzuli. On 9 October, both sides agreed to a temporary humanitarian ceasefire. Shortly after the ceasefire, the President of Artsakh admitted Azerbaijan had been able to achieve some success, moving the front deep into Artsakh territory; the Armenian Prime Minister announced that Armenian forces had conducted a "partial retreat".

However, the ceasefire quickly broke down with both sides accusing each other for breaking it. Following the collapse of the ceasefire, Azerbaijani advance continued. Within days Azerbaijan announced the capture of dozens of villages. The Azerbaijani forces, advancing more along the Aras River, captured the Khodaafarin Bridges and the nearby dam. On 20 October, the Azerbaijani forces took control of Zəngilan, just south of Qubadlı, and on 22 October, Ağbənd, thus taking full control over the Azerbaijan–Iran border.

== Offensive ==
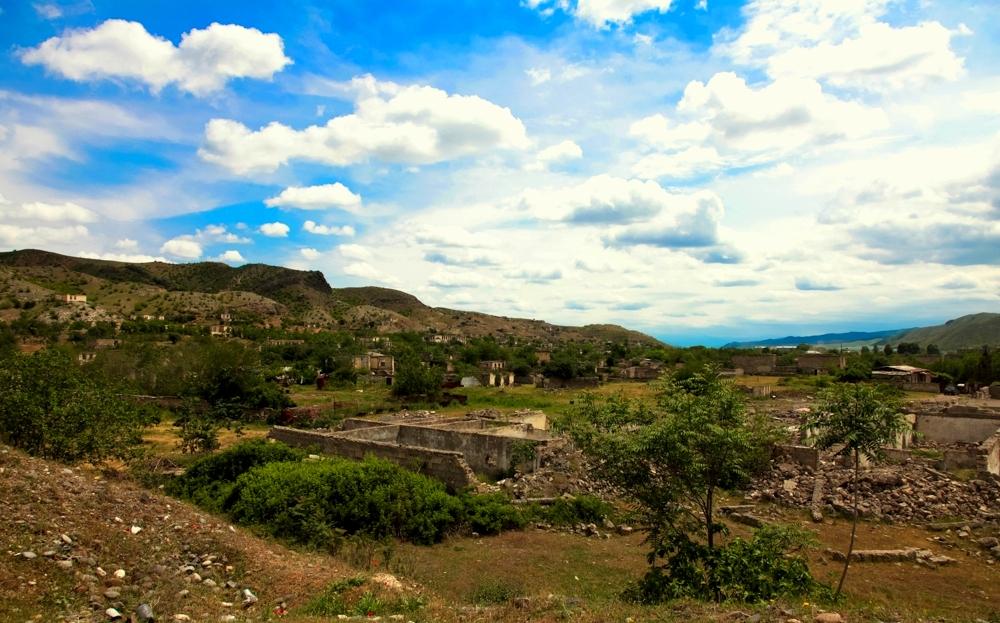
On 25 October, the Azerbaijani forces seized control of Qubadlı.

On 23 October, the clashes spilled to Qubadlı. In the evening, the Azerbaijani president Ilham Aliyev stated that Azerbaijani forces had control of Zilanlı, Kürd Mahrızlı, Muğanlı, and Alaqurşaq in Qubadli District. The Azerbaijani MoD also released supposed confirmatory footage from one of the villages. Shortly after, Artsakh authorities stated that Azerbaijani forces were attacking Laçın. The following day, clashes over Qubadlı yet again continued. At approximately midday, the Azerbaijani MoD stated that the Armenian forces were shelling Lachin District from the territory of Armenia; Armenia issued a denial and stated that Laçın was under Artsakh control. A BBC Russian Service correspondent confirmed that the city of Laçın was occupied by the Armenians, but was under heavy Azerbaijani shelling.

On 25 October, the clashes continued with varying intensity, with the Azerbaijani MoD stating that its forces had seized control of further territory. At night, the Azerbaijani president stated that Azerbaijani forces had seized control of Qubadlı, the administrative center of Gubadly District; Azerbaijan released confirmary footage. Subsequently, the Armenian MoD stated that heavy clashes were occurring. In the evening, the United States announced that both sides had agreed to a humanitarian ceasefire from the morning of 26 October. In the morning, the ceasefire collapsed. According to Azerbaijan, Armenian forces started shelling at 08:05, while according to Armenia, Azerbaijani artillery commenced shelling Armenian positions at 08:45. Subsequently, the Azerbaijani MoD stated that Armenian forces were firing upon Azerbaijani positions in Səfiyan in Lachin District. The Artsakh authorities and the Armenian prime minister stated that they were "strictly observing" the ceasefire.

On 26 October, in midday, the president of Azerbaijan stated that Azerbaijani forces had seized control of Padar, Əfəndilər, Yusifbəyli, Çay Tumas, Xanlıq, Sarıyataq, and Mollabürhan in Qubadli District along the Hakari Valley. Armenian authorities confirmed that Azerbaijani forces had launched an offensive in the region. At approximately 15:30, the Azerbaijani MoD stated that Armenian forces were shelling Aghjabadi District. In the evening, the Armenian MoD stated that the Azerbaijani shelling had drastically intensified, and the Artsakh authorities stated that the Azerbaijanis were continuing to launch new offensives, while the Azerbaijani MoD released footage, apparently from Padar. Subsequently, the Armenian authorities admitted that they had lost Qubadlı, and that the Azerbaijani forces had reached the Armenia–Azerbaijan border in south. Also, the Azerbaijani MoD released footage from Xanlıq.

On 27 October, the Armenian MoD stated that the Azerbaijani forces were shelling Laçın; Azerbaijan issued a denial. On 29 October, President of Azerbaijan, Ilham Aliyev stated that the Azerbaijani forces had seized control of Qiyaslı, Əbılcə, and Qilican in Qubadli District. Two days later, the Azerbaijani MoD released footage from newly captured villages in Hakari Valley. On 2 November, clashes continued near Qubadlı, with the President of Azerbaijan, Ilham Aliyev stating that the Azerbaijani forces had seized control of İşıqlı, Muradxanlı, and Milanlı in Qubadli District later in the day. On 4 November, the clashes continued near Qubadlı and Lachin Subsequently, the Armenian forces closed the Shusha–Lachin road for civilians. The President of Azerbaijan, Ilham Aliyev, stated that the Azerbaijani forces had seized control of several villages. Next day, the Armenian authorities stated that Lachin was heavily shelled overnight.

== Casualties ==
=== Military casualties ===
As of 26 October, the Azerbaijani authorities claimed that they had inflicted heavy losses on Armenian forces, but did not provide specific numbers. On 23 October, President of Azerbaijan, Ilham Aliyev, confirmed that the National Hero of Azerbaijan, Shukur Hamidov had died during the operations in Qubadli District.

=== Equipment losses ===
As of 26 October, the Azerbaijani authorities stated that their forces had downed three combat aircraft.
