= Qiyaslı =

Qiyaslı or Kiasly or Giyasly may refer to:

- Qiyaslı, Agdam, Azerbaijan
- Qiyaslı, Agsu, Azerbaijan
- Qiyaslı, Qubadli, Azerbaijan
- Qiyaslı, Samukh, Azerbaijan
