= Shukur Hamidov =

Azerbaijani officer (1975–2020)

Shukur Nariman oğlu Hamidov
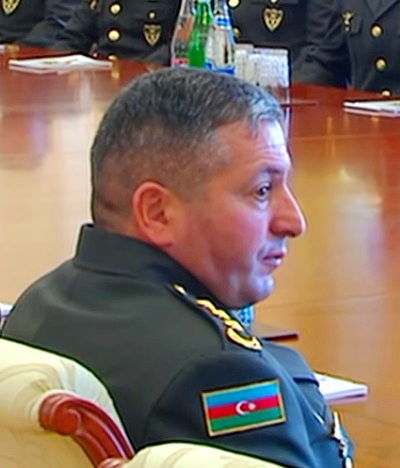
- Hamidov in 2017
- Born: 1 April 1975; Qubadli District, Azerbaijan SSR, USSR
- Died: 22 October 2020 (aged 45); Ağbənd, Zangilan/Nagorno-Karabakh region
- Military career
- Allegiance: Azerbaijan
- Branch: Armed Forces of Azerbaijan
- Rank: Colonel
- Commands: 2nd Army Corps, 706th Motor Rifle Brigade
- Conflicts: Four-Day War; Second Nagorno-Karabakh War; Aras Valley campaign; Lachin offensive †
- Awards: National Hero of Azerbaijan; 2016

Shukur Nariman oğlu Hamidov (Azerbaijani: Şükür Həmidov) (1 April 1975 – 22 October 2020) was an Azerbaijani officer, national hero and colonel of the Armed Forces of Azerbaijan. He was son to Nariman and Shargiya Hamidov. He was an enlisted member of the army since a young age and had experienced multiple wars. His family were refugees from Armenia that later migrated to Azerbaijan.

Shukur Hamidov was an attributed soldier with multiple accolades and awards to his name and his legacy follows him with his name being immortalised in the Qubadli district along with a school being named after him in the same country.

His relations include Zakir Hasanov, the President of Azerbaijan Ilham Aliyev, late Polad Hashimov and Mais Barkhudarov & Khudayar Yusifzade others.

== Biography ==
Shukur Hamidov was born in the Qubadli District of Azerbaijan SSR. He was the 9th child in the family of Nariman & Shargaya Hamidov. His father gave him the name of his own father.

Since 8th class Shukur Hamidov devoted himself to the army. Firstly, he graduated Jamshid Nakhchivanski Military Lyceum, then the High Military School in Baku. Hamidov served for more than 20 years.

His elder brother was involved in the first Nagorno-Karabakh war.

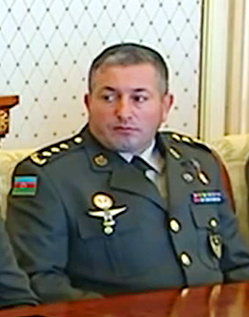
Hamidov in 2017

On the night from 1 to 2 April 2016 Armenian–Azerbaijani clashes took place along the line of contact in Nagorno-Karabakh and surrounding territories to the south. On 5 April, a mutual ceasefire agreement was reached. Lieutenant colonel Shukur Hamidov distinguished himself during the capture of the Lalatapa height near Çocuq Mərcanlı village of Jabrayil District. On 19 April 2016 Azerbaijani President Ilham Aliyev signed orders on awarding honorary titles, orders and medals to a group of Azerbaijani military servicemen who "have distinguished exceptional bravery and heroism while preventing the Armenian military provocations on the contact line of troops and repelling the enemy’s attacks on civilians from April 2 to 5". Shukur Hamidov was awarded the medal of National Hero of Azerbaijan.

On 23 October 2020, amidst the Second Nagorno-Karabakh War, President of Azerbaijan, Ilham Aliyev, confirmed that Shukur Hamidov had died during the operations in Qubadli District.

== List of Armed Conflicts ==
- 2008 Mardakert Skirmishes
- 2010 Nagorno-Karabakh clashes
- 2010 Mardakert clashes
- 2012 Armenian–Azerbaijani border clashes
- 2014 Armenian–Azerbaijani clashes
- April War
- Gyunnyut clashes
- July 2020 Armenian–Azerbaijani clashes
- 2020 Nagorno-Karabakh war

On 10 May 2016, during the visit of Azerbaijani defense minister Zakir Hasanov to military units in the frontline lieutenant colonel Shukur Hamidov for his bravery during the capture of Lalatapa height in early April, was prematurely promoted to the rank of colonel.

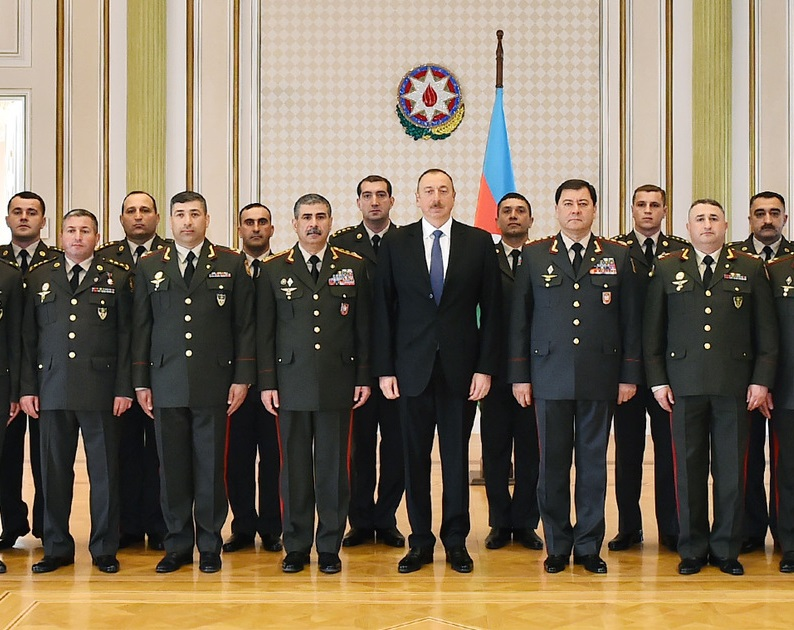
Colonel Shukur Hamidov

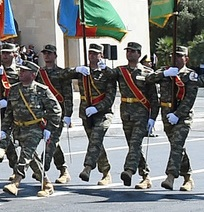
Armed Forces Day Azerbaijan

== Honours ==
- Azerbaijan for the Fatherland Medal Ribbon
- Azerbaijan for Liberation Medal Ribbon
- Azerbaijan for Liberation Medal Ribbon
- Azerbaijan for Liberation Medal Ribbon
- (2001) — Jubilee medal "10th anniversary of the Armed Forces of the Republic of Azerbaijan"
- Azerbaijan Democratic Republic Jubilee medal 100 years
- (2005) — Medal "For impeccable service" III degree
- (2008) — Jubilee medal "90th anniversary of the Armed Forces of the Republic of Azerbaijan"
- (2010) — Medal "For impeccable service" II degree
- (2013) — Jubilee medal "95th Anniversary of the Armed Forces of Azerbaijan"
- (2015) — Medal "For impeccable service" I degree
- (2016) — National Hero of Azerbaijan
- (2018) — Jubilee medal "100th anniversary of the Azerbaijani Army"
- - Gold Star Medal of Azerbaijan

== Short film ==
- Aprel yüksəkliyi (2018) - Azərbaycanın Milli Qəhrəmanı Şükür Həmidov
- Shukur Hamidov National Hero of Azerbaijan Milli Qəhrəman Şükür Həmidov

== Death ==
On 22 October 2020, Hamidov was shot and killed during the Lachin offensive, of the 2020 Nagorno-Karabakh conflict.

A commemoration ceremony was held on 1 April 2021.
