= 2nd Army Corps (Azerbaijan) =

- Azerbaijani: 2-ci Ordu Korpusu
- Badge of the 2nd Army Corps
- Active: 3 March 1992
- Country: Azerbaijan
- Branch: Azerbaijani Land Forces
- Garrison/HQ: Beylagan
- Nickname: "Beylagan Army Corps" or "Pirekeshkul Army Corps"
- Engagements: 2016 Nagorno-Karabakh conflict 2020 Nagorno-Karabakh war: Aras Valley campaign; Lachin offensive

Commanders
- Current commander: Mais Barkhudarov
- Notable commanders: Zaur Rzayev (deputy commander)

The 2nd Army Corps (Azerbaijani: 2-ci Ordu Korpusu), also referred to as the Beylagan Army Corps is a regional military formation of the Azerbaijani Land Forces. It is concentrated against Armenian occupied territories, specifically the Khojavend District, and is also partially deployed on the Azerbaijan–Iran border. It is currently led by Major General Mais Barkhudarov. It is currently deployed from Beylagan. Among their notable servicemen is Eyvaz Huseynov, the head of the Khojavend District Executive Power.

== History ==
=== Karabakh War ===
The unit was established on 3 March 1992 by the relevant order of the Minister of Defense of Azerbaijan at the time, Major General Tahir Aliyev. Among the units in its ranks in the 90s was the 161st Motor Rifle Brigade. The 706th Brigade of the National Army was formed in June 1992 in Ghubatlu as part of the corps. The corps sent to the front shortly after its establishment served as the main strike force during the First Nagorno-Karabakh War in the defense of the Fuzuli District, as well as Qırmızı Bazar, Shishkaya, and Gajar. It succeeded in taking Babi, Arayatli, Mollaməhərrəmli, Əhmədalılar, Şükürbəyli and others in Fuzuli from the Armenians.

After long disputes, President Abulfaz Elchibey supported the point of view of the General Staff, phoning the command of the 2nd Corps to inform them about his decision to conduct an operation to close the Lachin corridor. In early September 1992, a group of Russian officers, led by the head of the Operations Department of the 104th Guards Airborne Division, Lieutenant Colonel Vladimir Selivanov, were recalled from the headquarters of the 2nd Army Corps, who, as advisers, assisted the 2nd corps command in planning operations.

=== 21st century ===
In 2013, Defence Minister Zakir Hasanov visited the corps, which was considered the "fortress" of former Minister Safar Abiyev, many announced changes in the leadership structures, including the promotion of about 50 officers who were not promoted during Abiyev's tenure. The corps saw action in the 2016 April War battles, where it played a major role in capturing strategic heights. During the 2020 Nagorno-Karabakh conflict, the corps took part in operations against the Armed Forces of Armenia in the Khojavend District. It also took part in the Aras Valley campaign and the Lachin offensive. On 9 October, it was announced that the city of Hadrut and eight villages had been recaptured by the corps. By 20 October, thirteen more villages in the district came under the control of the corps. On 23 October, President Ilham Aliyev confirmed that the commander 706th Motor Rifle Brigade of the 2nd Army Corps, Shukur Hamidov had died during operations in the Qubadli District.

== Composition ==
- HQ (Beylagan)
- 2nd Motor Rifle Brigade
- 4th Motor Rifle Brigade
- 6th Motor Rifle Brigade
- 8th Motor Rifle Brigade
- 13th Motor Rifle Brigade
- 14th Motor Rifle Brigade
- 18th Motor Rifle Brigade

== Decorated servicemen ==
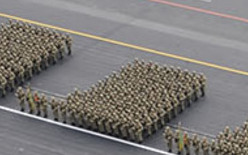
The 2nd Army Corps at the Baku Victory Parade of 2020.

During combat operations, a number of servicemen of the military unit were awarded honorary titles, orders and medals. Four are recipients of the title of National Hero of Azerbaijan. Others awarded with orders and medals include:

- Azerbaijani Flag Order – 15
- Medal "For military service" – 9
- Medal "For the Motherland" – 1
- Medal "For Courage" – 2
- Medal of the 3rd degree for distinction in military service – 1

== Commanders ==
- Major General Ayaz Hasanov (-until October 2014)
- Major General Mais Barkhudarov (since October 2014)

== See also ==
- Nakhchivan Garrison
