= Zaur Guliyev =

Azerbaijani military officer

Hero of the Patriotic War Zaur Guliyev
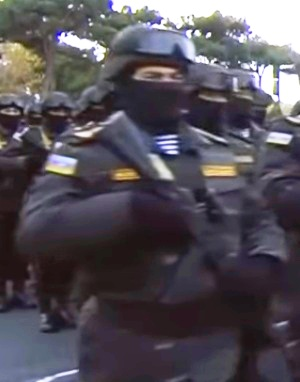
- Guliyev in 2020
- Allegiance: Azerbaijani Armed Forces
- Branch: Marine Infantry Battalion of the Azerbaijani Navy
- Rank: Captain 1st rank
- Conflicts: Second Nagorno-Karabakh War; Aras Valley campaign; Lachin offensive
- Awards: Hero of the Patriotic War Medal

Zaur Hikmat oghlu Guliyev (Azerbaijani: Zaur Hikmət oğlu Quliyev) is an Azerbaijani military officer, captain 1st rank of the marines of the Azerbaijani Navy, which is part of the Azerbaijani Armed Forces. He had participated in the 2020 Nagorno-Karabakh war, and had received the title of the Hero of the Patriotic War.

== Military service ==
Zaur Hikmat oglu Guliyev currently serves in the Marine Infantry Battalion of the Azerbaijani Naval Forces as the captain 1st rank.

During the 2020 Nagorno-Karabakh war, Zaur Guliyev and his squad took part in the Aras Valley campaign and the Lachin offensive. In the latter, Guliyev led his squad in the battle over the city of Gubadly, and several villages in the Gubadly District. On 26 October 2020, the President of Azerbaijan, Ilham Aliyev, congratulated Zaur Guliyev and his squad on their military activity in the city of Gubadly and the surrounding villages.

On 10 December 2020, during the Victory Parade in Baku on the occasion of the Azerbaijani victory in the war, the ceremonial squad of the marines of the Azerbaijani Naval Forces, led by Zaur Guliyev, also marched along with the other military formations that took part in the war.

== Awards ==
- Hero of the Patriotic War, awarded on 9 December 2020, by a decree of the President of Azerbaijan, Ilham Aliyev.
- For the Liberation of Jabrayil Medal, awarded on 24 December 2020, by a decree of President Aliyev.
- For the Liberation of Fuzuli Medal, awarded on 25 December 2020, by a decree of President Aliyev.
- For the Liberation of Khojavend Medal, awarded on 25 December 2020, by a decree of President Aliyev.
- For the Liberation of Gubadly Medal, awarded on 29 December 2020, by a decree of President Aliyev.
