= Xanlıq =

Village in Azerbaijan

Khanlyg
- Azerbaijani: Xanlıq
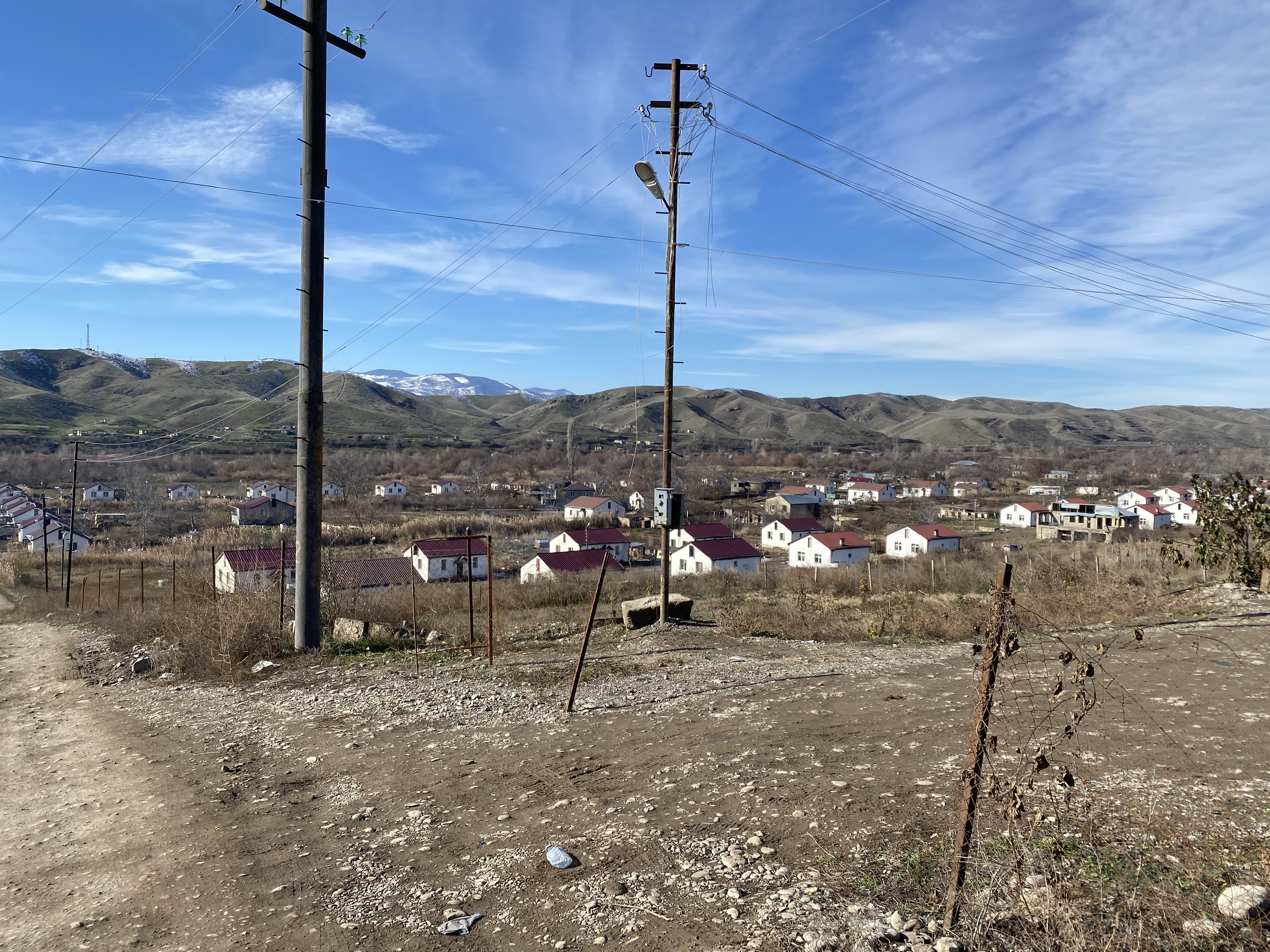

- Location within Azerbaijan Location within East Zangezur Economic Region
- Coordinates: 39°16′18″N 46°43′31″E
- Country: Azerbaijan
- District: Qubadli

Population (2015)
  - Total: 204
- Time zone: UTC+4 (AZT)

Xanlıq (Khanlyg; Azerbaijani pronunciation: [xɑnˈlɯx]) is a village in the Qubadli District of Azerbaijan. It is situated along the Hakari river.

== History ==
Khanlyg was part of the Jebrail Uyezd of Elisabethpol Governorate during the Russian Empire. According to 1886 census data, there were 148 homes and 648 Azerbaijanis (classified as "Tatars" in the census) of the Sunni branch of Islam in Khanlyg. According to the 1912 "Caucasian Calendar", the village of Khanlyg was home to 797 people, the majority of whom were Azerbaijanis (classified as "Tatars" in the census).

Khanlyg was part of the village council of the same name in the Zangilan District of the Azerbaijan SSR during the early Soviet period in 1933. The village had 312 farms and a total population of 1,385 people. The population of the village council, which also included the villages of Alaqurşaq, Mahruzlu, and Muğanlı, was 97.7 percent Azerbaijani.

The village had 2,201 residents in 1986. Its residents' main occupations were tobacco cultivation, agriculture, animal husbandry, and sericulture. There was a secondary school, a vocational school, a cultural centre, a library, and a hospital in the village.

During the First Nagorno-Karabakh War in 1993, Armenian forces occupied the village, forcing the Azerbaijani population to flee. It was later incorporated into the breakaway Republic of Artsakh as part of its Kashatagh Province, where it was known as Ishkhanadzor (Armenian: Իշխանաձոր). The village was eventually settled by Syrian Armenians fleeing the Syrian Civil War. According to Artur Aghabekyan, Deputy Prime Minister of Artsakh, the village of Xanlıq was purposefully chosen for settlement because it is at the crossroads of roads leading north to Lachin, east to Hadrut, and west to Armenia. In 2006 the village completed the construction of Ishkhanadzor Clinic with financial backing from the Tufenkian Foundation, while in 2014, it was reported that 34 additional homes had been built in the village using funds from the Artsakh Lottery. The village has served as a hub for 16 other smaller settlements in the surrounding areas. Azerbaijan described the settlement of Syrian Armenians on its internationally recognised territory as a violation of international law.

Azerbaijan recaptured the village on 26 October 2020, during the 2020 Nagorno-Karabakh War.

== Demographics ==
Year	Population	Ethnic composition	Source
1886	648	100% Tatars (i.e. Azerbaijanis)	Transcaucasian Statistical Committee
1912	797	Mostly Tatars	Caucasian Calendar
1986	2,201		Azerbaijani Soviet Encyclopedia
1993: Occupation of Xanlıq. Expulsion of Azerbaijani population
2015	204	~100% Armenians	NKR estimate

== Notable natives ==
- Karam Mirzayev (1960–1992) — National Hero of Azerbaijan.

== Gallery ==
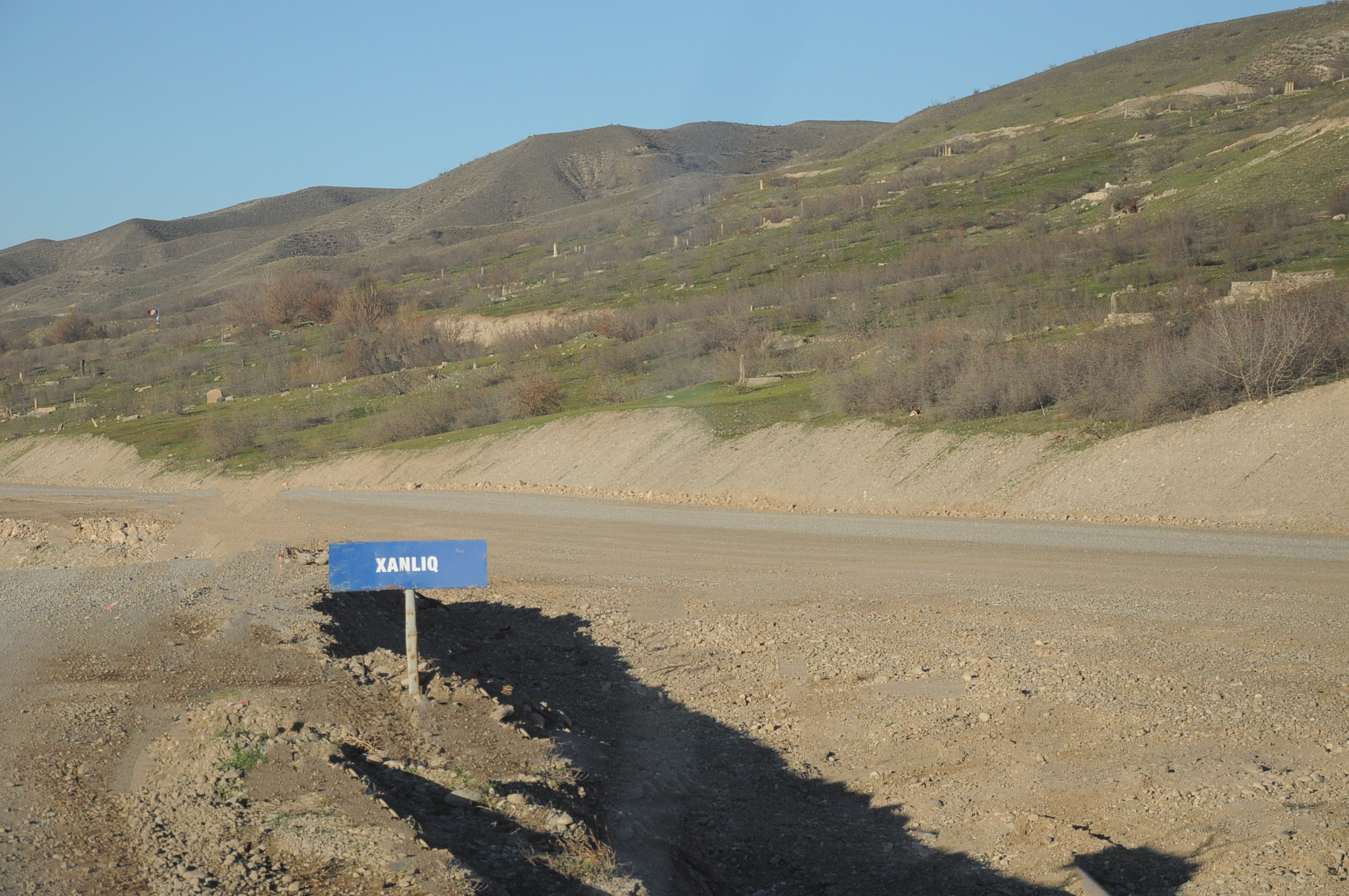
Ruins of Khanlyg

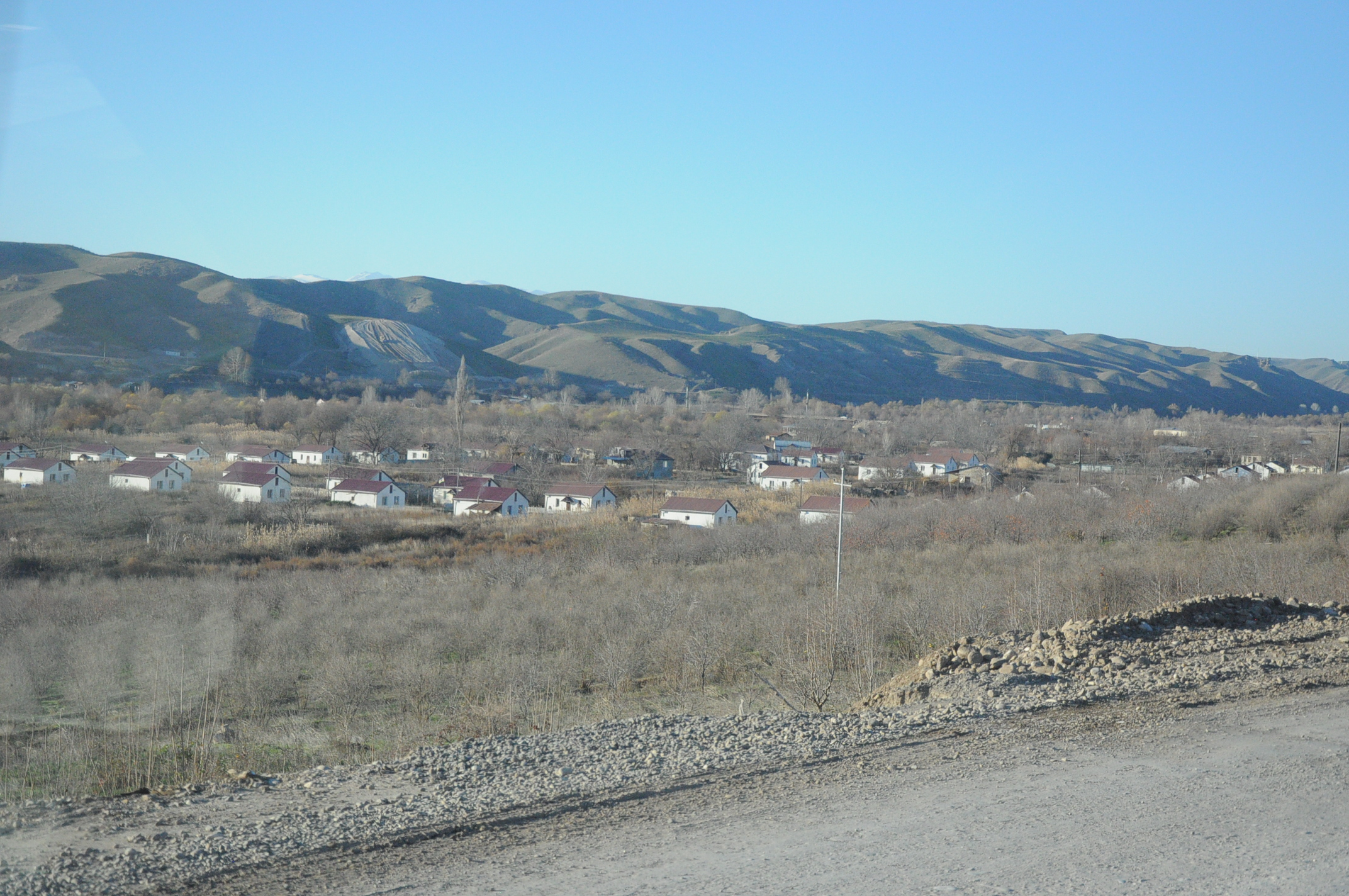

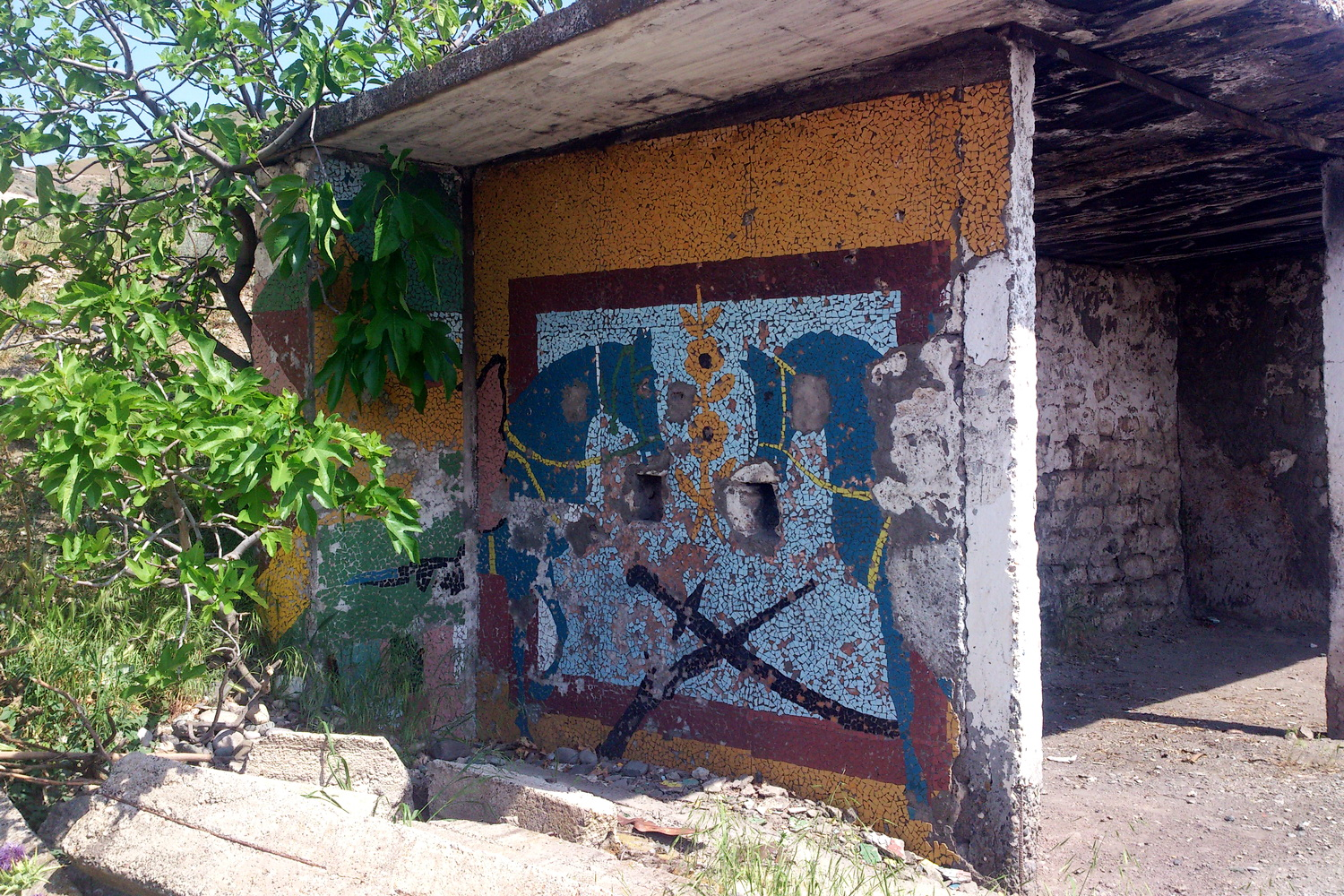
Soviet-era bus stop

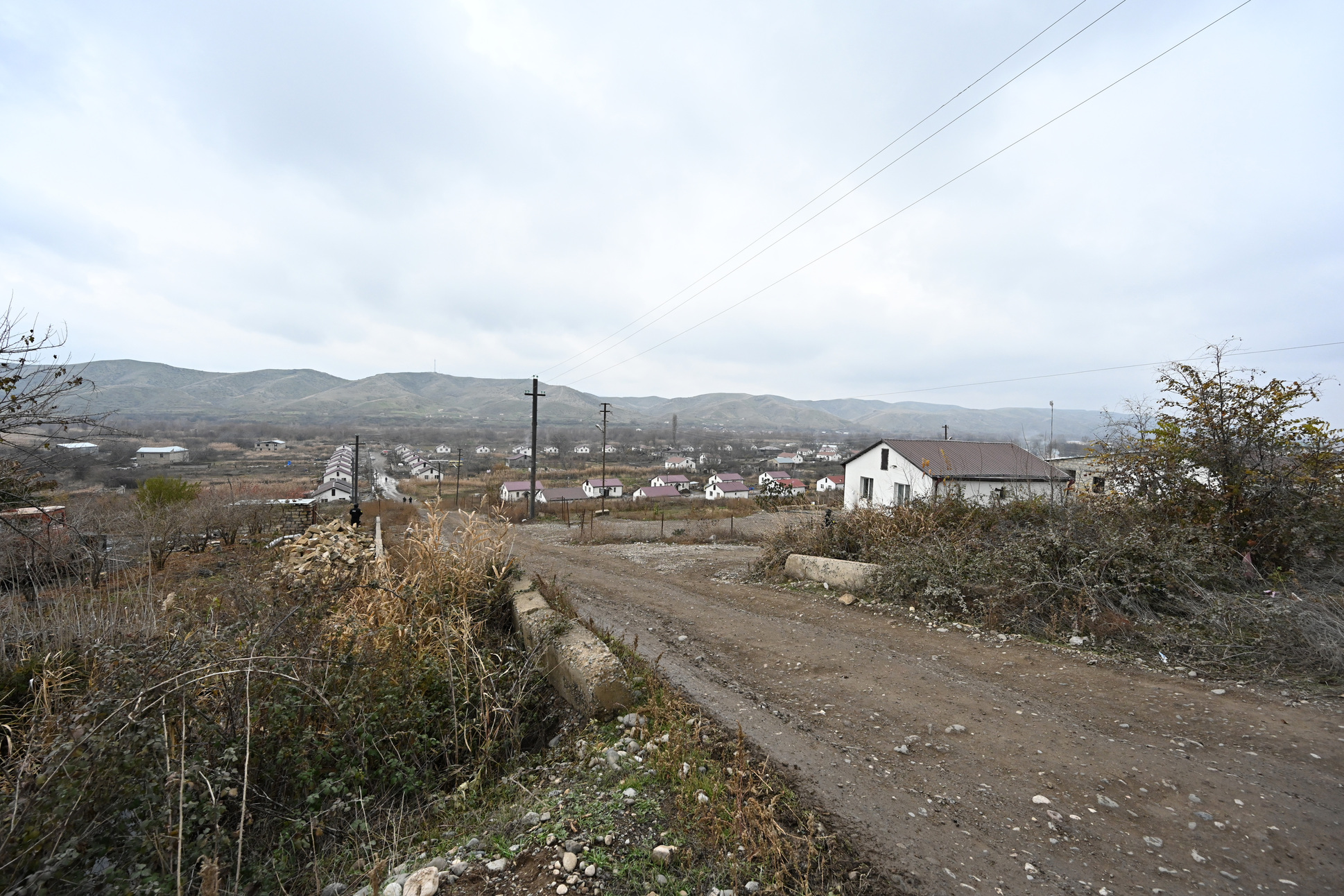

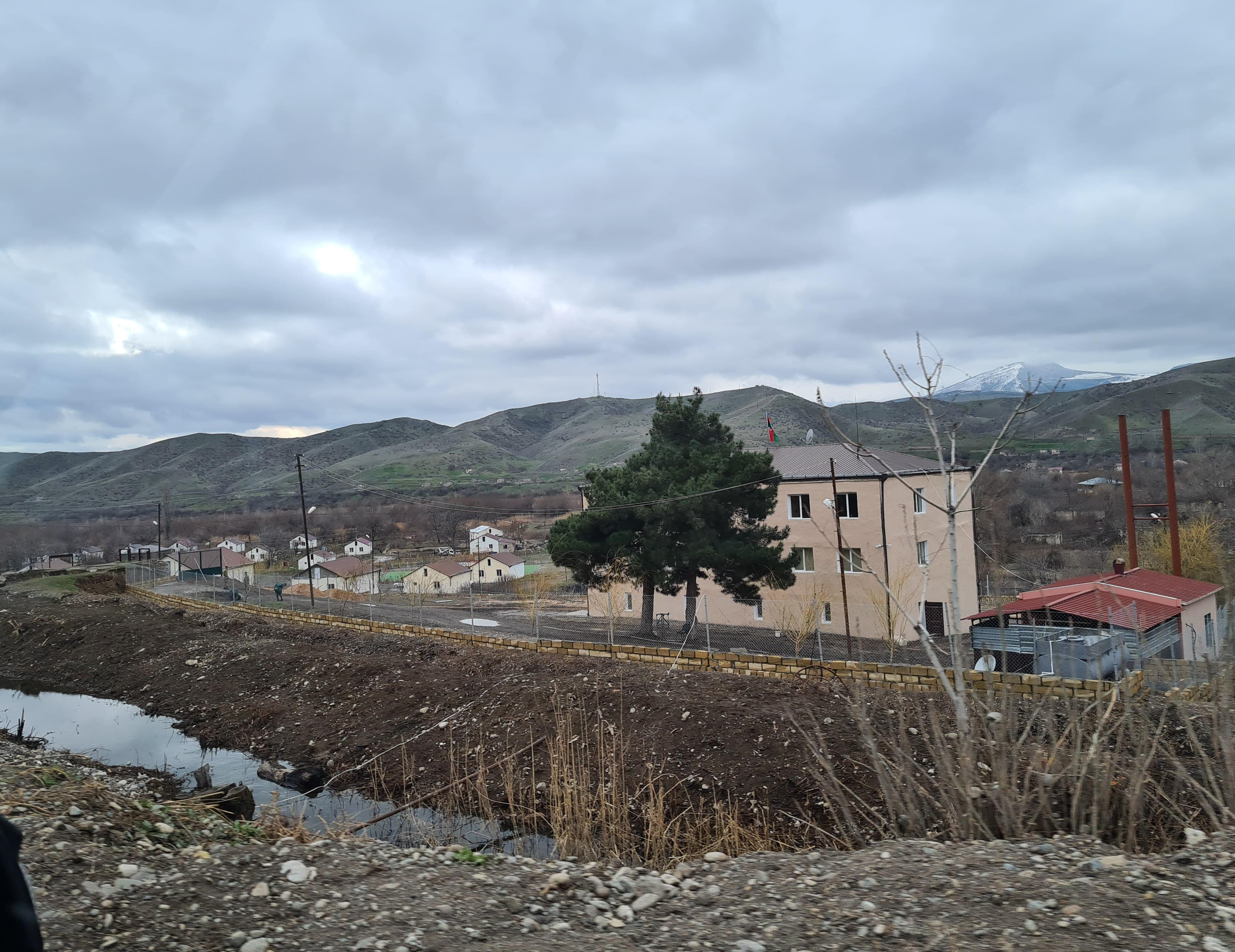
Barracks in the village

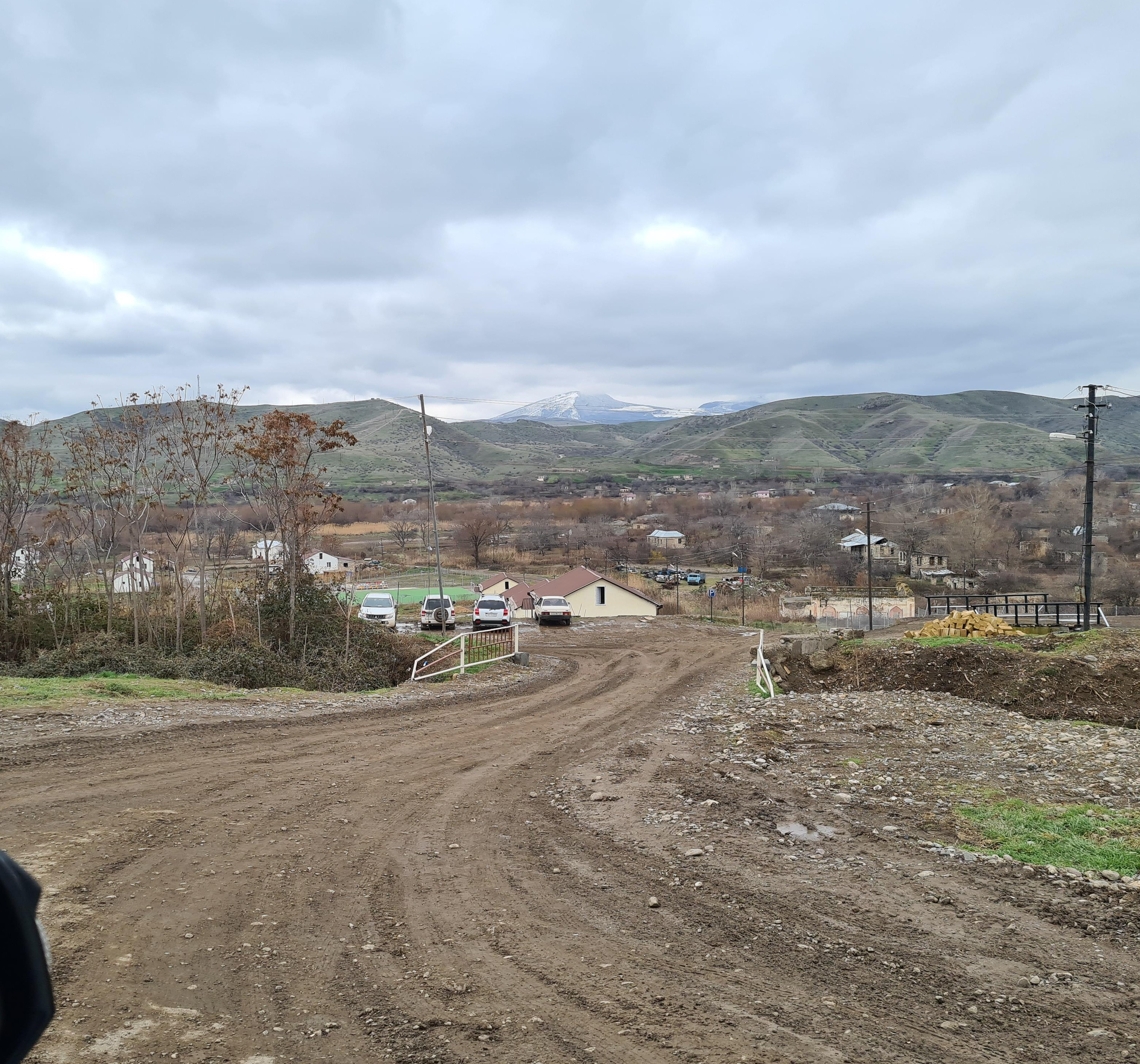
Entrance of the village

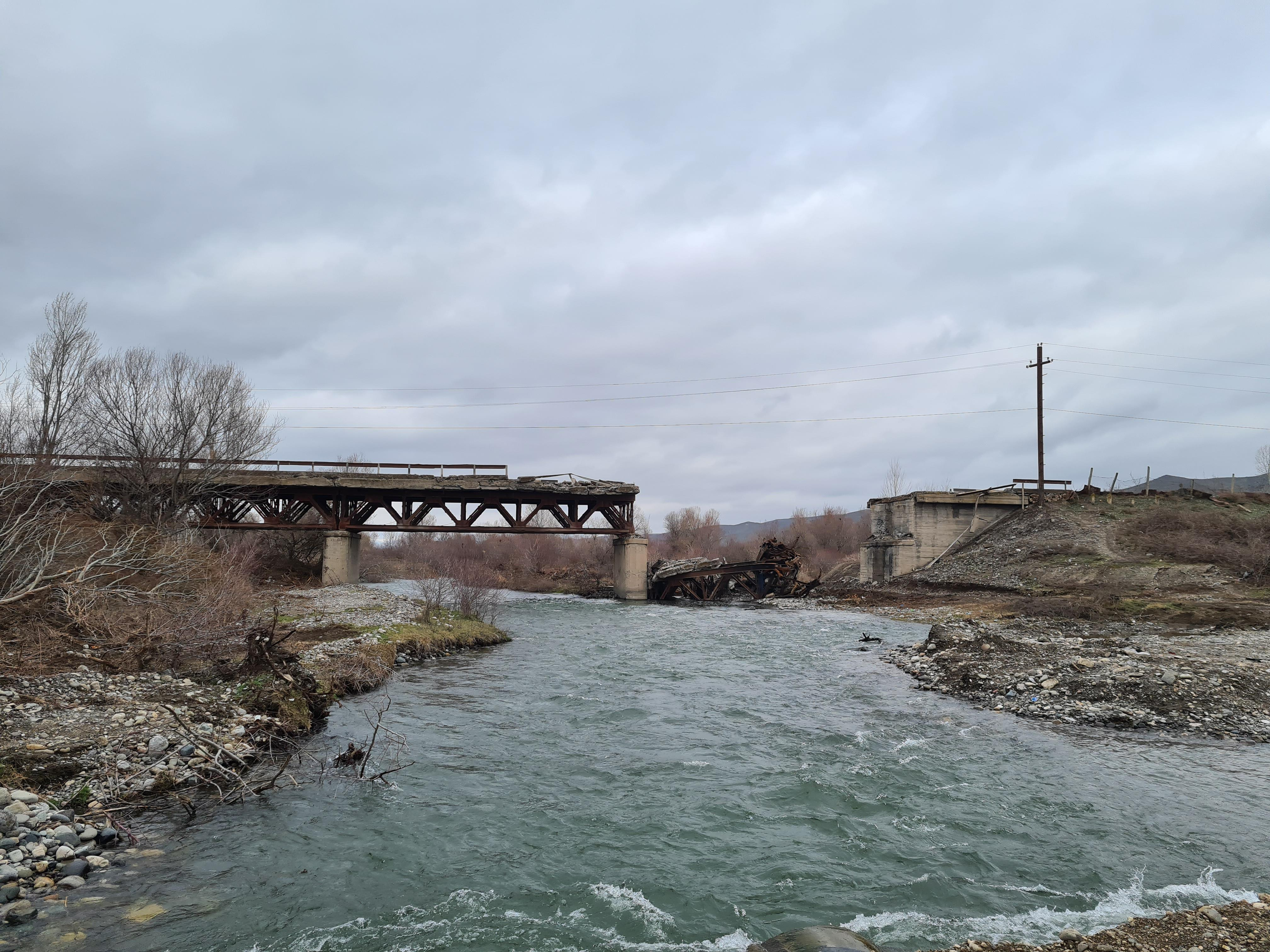
Destroyed bridge in Khanlyg
