= Sarı yataq =

Sarı yataq or Sarıyatag or Sariyatag or Sari Yatag may refer to:

- Sarıyataq, Azerbaijan
- Sari Yataq, Iran
