= Şükürbəyli =

Şükürbəyli or Shukyuragaly or Shukyurbeyli or Shyukyurbeyli or Shekyur-Beklu may refer to:

- Şükürbəyli, Agdam, Azerbaijan
- Şükürbəyli, Fizuli, Azerbaijan
- Şükürbəyli, Jabrayil, Azerbaijan
