= Yusifov =

Yusifov is a surname. Notable people with the surname include:

- Fikrat Yusifov (born 1957), Azerbaijani economist
- Fuad Yusifov, Commander of Azerbaijani Naval Forces
- Mikayil Yusifov (born 1982), Azerbaijani footballer
- Naig Yusifov (1970–1992), Azerbaijani soldier
- Namiq Yusifov (born 1986), Azerbaijani footballer
- Samir Yusifov (born 1994), Russian footballer
- Yusif Yusifov (1929–1998), Azerbaijani historian
- Zakir Yusifov (1956–1992), Azerbaijani soldier
