= Milanlu =

Milanlu may refer to

- Milanlı, Azerbaijan
- Milanlu-ye Olya, Iran
- Milanlu-ye Sofla, Iran
- Milanlu Rural District, Iran
