= Mahrızlı =

Mahrızlı or Mahruzlu or Makhryzly or Mekhrizli or Makhrizli may refer to:

- Mahrızlı, Agdam, Azerbaijan
- Mahruzlu, Qubadli, Azerbaijan
