= Səfiyan =

- Location within Azerbaijan Location within East Zangezur Economic Region
- Coordinates: 39°31′35″N 46°37′49″E
- Country: Azerbaijan
- District: Lachin

Population (2015)
  - Total: 47
- Time zone: UTC+4 (AZT)

Səfiyan (or Safiyan) is a village in the Lachin District of Azerbaijan.

== History ==
The village was located in the Armenian-occupied territories surrounding Nagorno-Karabakh, coming under the control of ethnic Armenian forces during the First Nagorno-Karabakh War in the early 1990s. The village subsequently became part of the breakaway Republic of Artsakh as part of its Kashatagh Province, referred to as Khachgetik (Armenian: Խաչգետիկ). It was recaptured by Azerbaijan on 9 November 2020 during the Lachin offensive in the 2020 Nagorno-Karabakh war.
