= Shahin Sultanov =

Azerbaijani military officer

Shahin Sultanov Şahin Sultanov

Commander of the Azerbaijani Navy
- In office 1999 – 11 March 2014
- President: Heydar Aliyev; Ilham Aliyev
- Preceded by: Fuad Yusifov
- Succeeded by: Yunus Mammadov (Acting)

Personal details
- Born: August 8, 1959 (age 67) Goychay, Goychay District, Azerbaijan SSR, Soviet Union

Military service
- Branch/service: Azerbaijani Navy
- Rank: Vice Admiral

Vice Admiral Shahin Sultanov (Azerbaijani: Şahin Əşrəf oğlu Sultanov) was the Commander of the Azerbaijani Naval Forces from 1999 to 2014.

== Early life and career ==
He was born on 8 August 1961 in the Goychay District of the Azerbaijan SSR. Sultanov graduated from the Navigation Department of the Caspian Higher Naval School named after Sergei Kirov.

He was appointed the Commander of Azerbaijani Naval Forces in 1999. Sultanov's rank was raised to Counter Admiral on January 19, 2002, and Vice Admiral on June 24, 2005. He was awarded the Veten Ughrunda Medal (In the Name of Motherland) on June 24, 2003; Azerbaijani Flag Order on June 22, 2006; and Herbi Xidmlete Gore Medal on June 24, 2010.

As the commander of navy, he modernized the Azerbaijani Navy's capabilities and established close contacts with the Turkish Navy and Pakistan Navy.

== Commander of the Azerbaijani Navy ==
Sultanov served as Commander of the Azerbaijani Naval Forces from 1999 until his dismissal on 11 March 2014. During his tenure, he represented Azerbaijan in regional naval diplomacy and security cooperation with Russia, Pakistan, Turkey and the United States.

=== Relations with Russia ===
In September 2003, Sultanov accompanied a group of Azerbaijani warships on a visit to the Russian Caspian Flotilla's base in Astrakhan. During the visit, he met Rear Admiral Yuri Startsev, commander of the Caspian Flotilla, Astrakhan Governor Anatoly Guzhvin and Astrakhan mayor Igor Bezrukavnikov. AZERTAC reported that the voyage was the first visit by the warships of one Commonwealth of Independent States member to another member state since the organization had been established. Sailors from the two countries toured one another's vessels, and the naval orchestras of the Azerbaijani Navy and the Caspian Flotilla participated in a joint concert.

Sultanov led another Azerbaijani naval group to Astrakhan in September 2013. The group consisted of three warships and was escorted toward the port by the Russian small artillery ship Volgodonsk. The planned programme included meetings with the Caspian Flotilla command and Astrakhan regional officials, the laying of wreaths at the Eternal Flame and flowers at a monument to Heydar Aliyev, and opening the Azerbaijani vessels to members of the public.

=== Relations with Pakistan ===
In October 2004, Sultanov led an Azerbaijani naval delegation on an official visit to Pakistan at the invitation of Chief of the Naval Staff Admiral Shahid Karimullah. Sultanov held discussions with Karimullah on expanding relations between the two navies and was also received by Pakistani Defence Minister Rao Sikandar Iqbal. The Azerbaijani delegation visited Pakistan Navy Headquarters, Karachi Shipyard, the Naval War College in Lahore and several military units.

In September 2010, Sultanov returned to Pakistan as the head of an Azerbaijani naval delegation. He met General Tariq Majid, Chairman of Pakistan's Joint Chiefs of Staff Committee, at Joint Staff Headquarters in Chaklala. According to Trend News Agency, they exchanged views on regional security, bilateral defence cooperation and other professional matters. Sultanov also expressed condolences for those killed in the 2010 Pakistan floods and conveyed Azerbaijan's solidarity with the victims. Majid thanked Azerbaijan for providing US$2 million and approximately US$690,000 worth of goods for flood-relief efforts.

=== Cooperation with the United States ===
In March 2006, Sultanov joined an Azerbaijani delegation participating in the annual United States–Azerbaijan security dialogue at the United States Department of State in Washington, D.C. The discussions addressed counterterrorism, border security, the prevention of weapons proliferation and broader bilateral security cooperation.

On 10 June 2008, Sultanov met Vice Admiral Kevin Cosgriff, commander of United States Naval Forces Central Command and the United States Fifth Fleet, aboard a naval vessel in Baku. According to the official U.S. Navy description of the meeting, they discussed initiatives intended to improve the exchange of information and experience relating to regional and maritime security.

=== Regional naval cooperation ===
During Sultanov's command, the Azerbaijani Navy participated in cooperation and training programmes with Turkish and United States forces. The Ministry of Defence describes activities during this period as including joint exercises, exchanges of professional experience and training connected with the protection of offshore oil and gas infrastructure in Azerbaijan's sector of the Caspian Sea.

== Arrest ==
Sultanov was arrested on 24 April 2014 on charges of official forgery, theft and embezzlement and as a preventive measure placed under house arrest. A military court in the Nəsimi raion sentenced him to eight years and six months in prison with a probationary period of three years. According to his lawyer, the court's decision was based on Sultanov's military service record. Sultanov denied the charges and, through his lawyers, alleged that officials in the Military Prosecutor's Office had falsified the investigation materials and evidence against him.He was then released from all charges

== See also ==
- Azerbaijani Army
- Ministers of Defense of Azerbaijan Republic
- General Staff of Azerbaijani Armed Forces
