= Khudayar Yusifzade =

Azerbaijani soldier

- Xudayar Yusifzadə
- Born: 15 July 1998; Barda, Azerbaijan
- Died: 22 October 2020 (aged 22); Aghbend, Zangilan District, Azerbaijan
- Military career
- Allegiance: Azerbaijan
- Branch: Azerbaijani Armed Forces
- Service years: 2016–2020
- Rank: Master sergeant
- Conflicts: Second Nagorno-Karabakh War
- Awards

Khudayar Muslum oghlu Yusifzade (Azerbaijani: Xudayar Müslüm oğlu Yusifzadə; 15 July 1998 – 22 October 2020) was an officer of the Azerbaijani army and Warrant officer.

He was killed on 22 October 2020 during the 2020 Nagorno-Karabakh war.

== Awards ==
- The Fatherland medal ribbon
- Flag order ribbon
- For liberation medal ribbon

== Early life ==
Khudayar Yusifzadeh was born on 15 July 1998 in the city of Barda. Twenty-four days after his birth, he lost his father (Muslim Yusif oglu), a well-known accordionist in Barda. There were 4 children in the Yusifzade family - 3 brothers and 1 sister. Khudayar Yusifzadeh was the last child in the family. He graduated from the Children's Art School No. 1 named after Bulbul in Barda.

== Career ==
He was a warrant officer of the State Border Service.

After Tovuz clashes, he volunteered to serve. After the Azerbaijani army captured Fuzuli, he began serving at the newly established border checkpoint there. He voluntarily took part in the battles in the direction of Kalbajar, Jabrayil, Zangilan.

He took part in the battles for Murovdag heights in the direction of the Kalbajar region. After a while, he fought in the direction of Fuzuli, Jabrayil, Zangilan. He showed courage in capturing the village of Aghbend in Zangilan.

He died on 22 October, in the Aghbend direction. He was 22.

== "Vətən yaxşıdır" song ==
Two days before the fighting, he videotaped himself with his comrades-in-arms while singing the song "Vətən yaxşıdır" written in the words of Aliagha Vahid. The video became a trend on social networks.

== See also ==
- 2020 Nagorno-Karabakh war
- Aras Valley campaign
