= Commander of the Navy (Azerbaijan) =

- Hərbi Dəniz Qüvvələrinin Komandanı
- Naval Flag of Azerbaijan
- Incumbent; Rear Admiral Shahin Mammadov since 18 December 2024
- Ministry of Defence
- Member of: General Staff of Azerbaijani Armed Forces
- Reports to: Chief of the General Staff
- Formation: 1991
- First holder: Rafig Asgarov
- Deputy: Deputy commander of the Navy

The Commander of the Azerbaijani Navy (Azerbaijani: Hərbi Dəniz Qüvvələrinin Komandanı) is the head of the Naval operations and the administrative head of the Azerbaijani Navy. The commander is subordinate to the Chief of the General Staff and the Minister of Defence. The current Commander of the Navy is Rear Admiral Shahin Mammadov.

== List of commanders ==
No.	Portrait	Commander of the Navy	Took office	Left office	Time in office	Ref.
1	Rafig Asgarov	Rear Admiral; Rafig Asgarov (born 1949)	1991	1993	1–2 years	–
2	Fuad Yusifov	Captain 1st class Fuad Yusifov	1993	1999	5–6 years	–
3	Shahin Sultanov	Vice Admiral; Shahin Sultanov (born 1959)	1999	11 March 2014	14–15 years	
–	Yunus Mammadov [az]	Captain 1st Rank; Yunus Mammadov; Acting	11 March 2014	31 March 2014	20 days	
–	Shahin Mammadov [az]	Captain 2nd Rank; Shahin Mammadov	15 May 2014	11 April 2016	1 year, 332 days	
–	Hijran Rustamzade [az]	Captain 1st Rank; Hijran Rustamzade (born 1960); Acting	11 April 2016	25 January 2017	289 days	
4	Zaur Gumbetov [az]	Captain 1st Class; Zaur Gumbetov (born 1959)	25 January 2017	29 June 2020	3 years, 156 days	
5	Subhan Bekirov [az]	Vice Admiral; Subhan Bekirov (born 1964)	29 June 2020	18 December 2024	4 years, 172 days	
6	Shahin Mammadov [az]	Rear Admiral; Shahin Mammadov	18 December 2024	Incumbent	1 year, 281 days	
