= Puta, Azerbaijan =

Puta
- Municipality
- Location within Azerbaijan
- Coordinates: 40°17′48″N 49°39′37″E
- Country: Azerbaijan
- City: Baku
- Raion: Garadagh

Population (2008)
  - Total: 1,253
- Time zone: UTC+4 (AZT)
  - Summer (DST): UTC+5 (AZT)

Puta is a settlement and municipality in Baku, Azerbaijan. It has a population of 1,253. Puta hosts the main naval base of the Azerbaijani Navy. The Puta Base is the largest military facility in the Caspian Sea basin.
