= Yashar Hasanov =

Azerbaijani military officer

- Allegiance: Azerbaijani Armed Forces
- Branch: Azerbaijani Land Forces
- Rank: Colonel
- Conflicts: First Nagorno-Karabakh War; Four-Day War; Second Nagorno-Karabakh War
- Awards: For military services medal; III degree For service to the Fatherland Order; For Heroism Medal

Yashar Amirkhan oghlu Hasanov (Azerbaijani: Yaşar Əmirxan oğlu Həsənov), is an Azerbaijani military officer, and colonel of the Azerbaijani Armed Forces. He took part in the April 2016 clashes, and the Lachin offensive within the framework of the 2020 Nagorno-Karabakh war.

== Military service ==
In 1994, Yashar Hasanov was awarded the For military services medal by the decision of then the President of Azerbaijan Heydar Aliyev as a senior lieutenant. In 2014, Yashar Hasanov was awarded the rank of colonel. He was awarded III degree For service to the Fatherland Order by the decision of the current President of Azerbaijan Ilham Aliyev. In 2016, Colonel Yashar Hasanov was again awarded the For Heroism Medal by the order of Ilham Aliyev for his activity during the April clashes. In October 2020, during the 2020 Nagorno-Karabakh war, Aliyev congratulated Yashar Hasanov for distinguishing themselves in the Battle over Qubadli, within the framework of the Lachin offensive.
