= Fuad Yusifov =

Azerbaijani naval officer

Fuad Yusubov
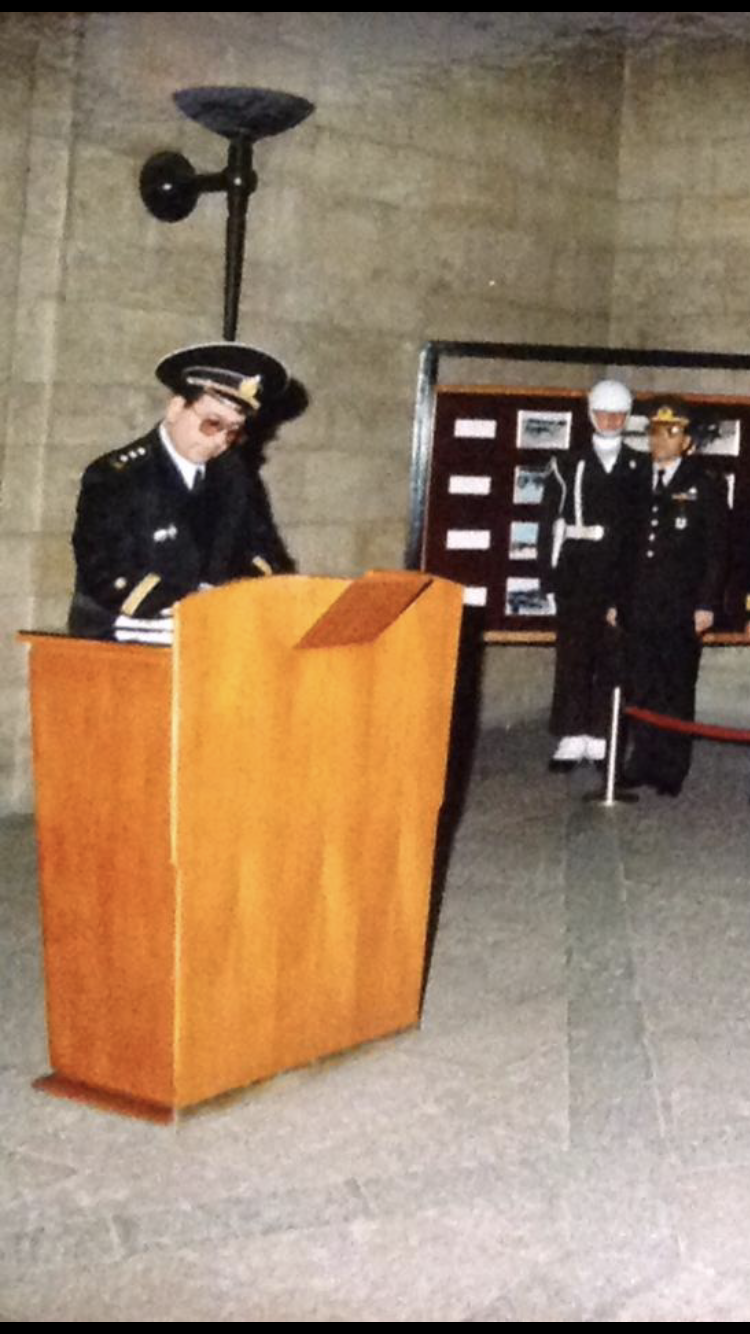

Commander of the Azerbaijani Navy
- In office 1993–1999
- President: Heydar Aliyev
- Preceded by: Rafig Asgarov
- Succeeded by: Shahin Sultanov

Personal details
- Born: 15 March 1951 (age 75) Baku, Azerbaijan SSR, USSR

Military service
- Branch/service: Azerbaijani Navy
- Years of service: till 1999
- Rank: Captain First class

Captain First Class Fuad Yusubov was the Commander of Azerbaijani Naval Forces from 1993 to 1999. He was replaced in 1999 by Vice Admiral Shahin Sultanov.

== See also ==
- Azerbaijani Army
- Ministers of Defense of Azerbaijan Republic
- General Staff of Azerbaijani Armed Forces
