= Muradxanlı, Qubadli =

Muradxanlı
- Location within Azerbaijan Location within East Zangezur Economic Region
- Coordinates: 39°27′16″N 46°37′35″E
- Country: Azerbaijan
- District: Qubadli

Population (2015)
  - Total: 119
- Time zone: UTC+4 (AZT)

Muradxanlı (Muradkhanly) is a village in the Qubadli District of Azerbaijan.

== History ==
The village was located in the Armenian-occupied territories surrounding Nagorno-Karabakh, coming under the control of ethnic Armenian forces during the First Nagorno-Karabakh War in the early 1990s. The village subsequently became part of the breakaway Republic of Artsakh as part of its Kashatagh Province, referred to as Hakari (Armenian: Հակարի). It was recaptured by the Azerbaijani Army on 2 November 2020 during the Lachin offensive.

== Historical heritage sites ==
Historical heritage sites in and around the village include the fortress of Karnakash (Armenian: Կառնակաշ, also Ghalali), two reservoirs, and a defensive wall from between the 11th and 14th centuries, as well as the 14th-century khachkar of Hakari (Հակարի).

== Demographics ==
The village had 126 inhabitants in 2005, and 119 inhabitants in 2015.
