= Rafig Asgarov =

Azerbaijani military commander

Rafig Asgarov Rafiq Əsgərov

Commander of the Azerbaijani Navy
- In office 1991–1993
- President: Abulfaz Elchibey
- Preceded by: position established
- Succeeded by: Fuad Yusifov

Personal details
- Born: 1949 (age 76–77) Azerbaijan SSR, USSR

Military service
- Branch/service: Azerbaijani Navy
- Rank: Counter Admiral

Counter Admiral Rafig Asgarov (Azerbaijani: Rafiq Əsgərov) (born 1949) is a retired Azerbaijani military leader, and was the Commander of the Azerbaijani Naval Forces after the restoration of the independence of Azerbaijan in 1991.

He was appointed Commander of Azerbaijani Naval Forces in 1991, and he is one of the few Azerbaijani admirals who served in high-ranking positions. He was replaced by Captain Fuad Yusifov.

== See also ==
- Azerbaijani Army
- Ministers of Defense of Azerbaijan Republic
- General Staff of Azerbaijani Armed Forces
