= Yusifbəyli =

- Location within Azerbaijan
- Coordinates: 39°19′07″N 46°42′14″E
- Country: Azerbaijan
- Rayon: Qubadli
- Time zone: UTC+4 (AZT)
  - Summer (DST): UTC+5 (AZT)

Yusifbəyli (also, Yusifbeyli and Usubbeyli) is a village in the Qubadli Rayon of Azerbaijan.

In 2021, an 18th-century mosque in the village was demolished by a road construction team while an existing roadway was being expanded. Prior to its destruction, the mosque had been officially recognized as a locally significant architectural heritage site.
