= Şükürbəyli, Agdam =

Şükürbəyli
- Location within Azerbaijan Location within Karabakh Economic Region
- Coordinates: 40°05′N 47°03′E
- Country: Azerbaijan
- Rayon: Agdam
- Time zone: UTC+4 (AZT)
  - Summer (DST): UTC+5 (AZT)

Şükürbəyli (also, Shukyuragaly) is a village in the Agdam Rayon of Azerbaijan.
