= Marine Infantry of Azerbaijan =

Marine Infantry Battalion
- Dəniz Piyada Taburu
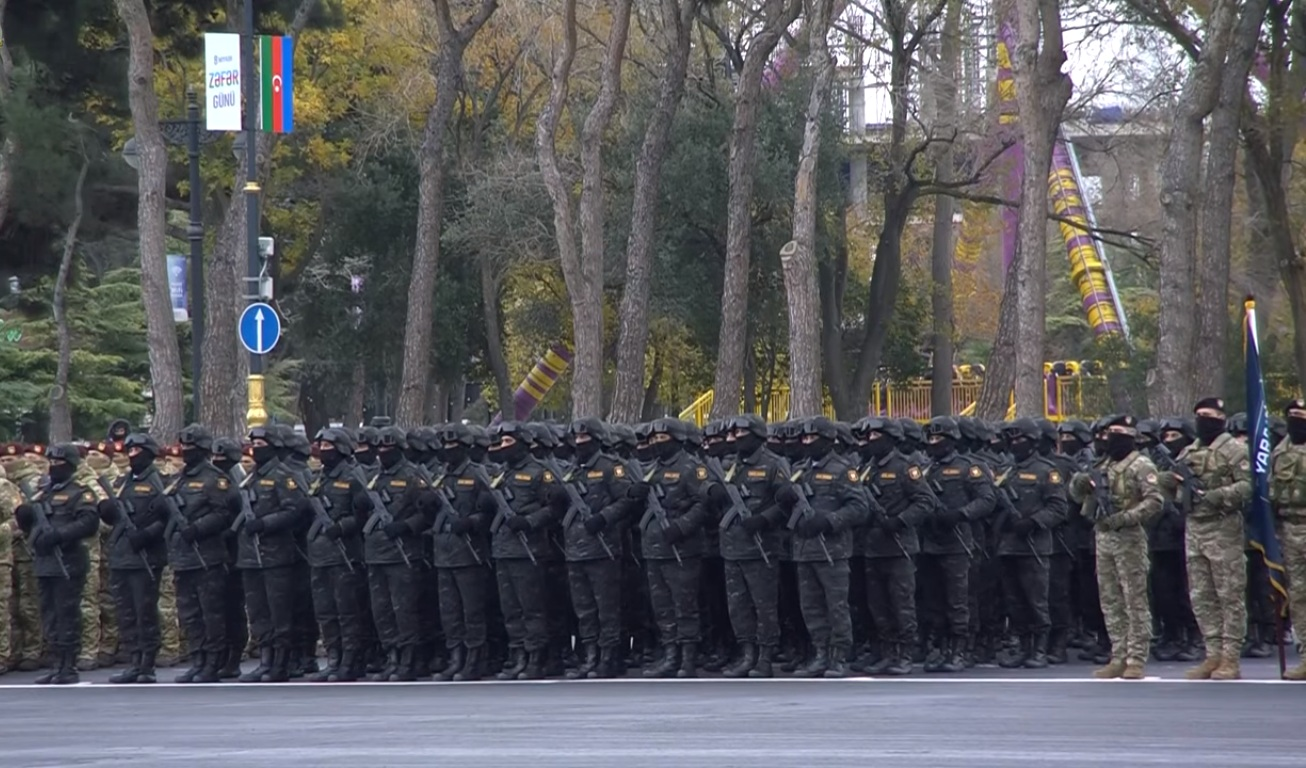
- A formation of marines at the Baku Victory Parade of 2020.
- Founded: 1994
- Country: Azerbaijan
- Branch: Azerbaijani Navy
- Type: Marines
- Role: Amphibious reconnaissance Amphibious warfare Armoured warfare Artillery observer Anti-tank warfare Bomb disposal CBRN defense Close-quarters combat Counterinsurgency; Demining; Desert warfare Fire support Force protection HUMINT; Indirect fire Intelligence assessment Maneuver warfare Military engineering Naval boarding Patrolling; Raiding; Reconnaissance; Urban warfare
- Size: 2,000
- Part of: Azerbaijan Armed Forces
- Garrison/HQ: Zikh (outskirts of Baku)
- Equipment: IWI Tavor X95

The Marine Infantry Battalion (Azerbaijani: Dəniz Piyada Taburu) is a marine corps of the Republic of Azerbaijan. It serves in combat operations an amphibious assault force of the Azerbaijani Navy. It is currently based in Zığ. Its polygon is on Wulf Island in the Bay of Baku.

== Overview ==
Due to a need for extra troops on the front lines of the First Nagorno-Karabakh War, a Marine Battalion was formed from the personnel of the naval and ground units of the Naval Forces. The battalion was sent on 19 April 1994 to the front in order to prevent an enemy offensive in the Aghdam, returning on 25 July upon the successful completion of its combat mission. A United States Navy delegation visited Baku from 15 to 18 September 2009 to familiarize themselves with the service combat activities of the unit. Exchanges of marines have also been carried out with a number of foreign countries.

=== 2020 Karabakh war ===
Members of the marine infantry took part in hostilities during the 2020 Nagorno-Karabakh war. The marines took part in the capture of the Qubadli District. They were honored alongside other military personnel at the Baku Victory Parade on Azadliq Square on 10 December. The marine formation was led by First Class Captain Zaur Guliyev. Captain Guliyev was earlier awarded the title of Hero of the Patriotic War. Personnel of the marine infantry completed their missions and returned to their base on 1 December, during which the Commander of the Naval Forces Rear Admiral Subhan Bekirov expressed gratitude to them.

== See also ==
- Special Forces of Azerbaijan
- 390th Guards Naval Infantry Brigade
- 641st Special Warfare Naval Unit
