= Sari Yataq =

Sari Yataq ساري ياتاق
- Village
- Location within Iran
- Coordinates: 39°14′38″N 47°06′04″E
- Country: Iran
- Province: East Azerbaijan
- County: Khoda Afarin
- Bakhsh: Central
- Rural District: Bastamlu

Population (2006)
  - Total: 54
- Time zone: UTC+3:30 (IRST)
  - Summer (DST): UTC+4:30 (IRDT)

Sari Yataq (Persian: ساري ياتاق, also Romanized as Sārī Yātāq) is a village in Bastamlu Rural District, in the Central District of Khoda Afarin County, East Azerbaijan Province, Iran. At the 2006 census, its population was 54, in 11 families. The village is populated by the Kurdish Chalabianlu tribe.
