= 641st Naval Special Operations Brigade =

- 641-ci Xüsusi Dəniz Əməliyyatları Briqadası
- Founded: 2001
- Country: Azerbaijan
- Branch: Azerbaijani Navy
- Type: Special forces
- Role: Counter Terrorism; Direct Action; Unconventional Warfare
- Part of: Azerbaijan Armed Forces
- Garrison/HQ: Zikh (outskirts of Baku)

The 641st Naval Special Operations Brigade (Azerbaijani: 641-ci Xüsusi Dəniz Əməliyyatları Briqadası) is a special forces unit in the Azerbaijani Navy. It is currently based in Zığ. The unit has been described as an 'impressive new maritime special forces unit. Its polygon is on Wulf Island in the Bay of Baku. The modern unit was established in 2001 with the cooperation of the Turkish Navy.

== Cooperation ==
The training and organization structure of the unit may be similar to Turkish special forces, Su Altı Taarruz and United States Special Forces who have a training relationship with them. In 2004, a U.S. Navy SEAL team from Little Creek Amphibious Base, participated in joint exercises unit. In 2005, Blackwater USA's Maritime Division was contracted to conduct interdiction training for the unit. In addition, personnel of the unit have trained at the diving school of the Latvian Navy in Liepaja. Exchanges of personnel have also been carried out with a number of foreign countries.

== Marine Sabotage and Reconnaissance Center of Special Purpose ==
The Marine Sabotage and Reconnaissance Center of Special Purpose is the training center of the unit. The organizational and staff structure of the center in 1996 includes: 3 reconnaissance groups, 2 mountain groups and 1 diving group. Each group included 15-20 fighters each. The personnel have participated in a number of joint military exercises with the Turkish Amphibious Marine Brigade and United States Marine Corps.

== See also ==
- Special Forces of Azerbaijan
- United States Navy SEALs
