= Mollabürhan =

- Location within Azerbaijan
- Coordinates: 39°21′13″N 46°40′14″E
- Country: Azerbaijan
- Rayon: Qubadli
- Time zone: UTC+4 (AZT)
  - Summer (DST): UTC+5 (AZT)

Mollabürhan (also, Mollaburan, Molla-buran, and Mollaburkhan) is a village in the Qubadli Rayon of Azerbaijan.

Mollabürhan is Azeri village in Qubadli
