= Qiyaslı, Samukh =

Qiyaslı
- Municipality
- Location within Azerbaijan
- Coordinates: 40°43′N 46°29′E
- Country: Azerbaijan
- Rayon: Samukh

Population
  - Total: 481
- Time zone: UTC+4 (AZT)
  - Summer (DST): UTC+5 (AZT)

Qiyaslı (also, Kiyasly) is a village and municipality in the Samukh Rayon of Azerbaijan. It has a population of 481.
