= Qiyaslı, Agsu =

Qiyaslı
- Municipality
- Location within Azerbaijan
- Coordinates: 40°29′43″N 48°26′50″E
- Country: Azerbaijan
- Rayon: Agsu

Population
  - Total: 504
- Time zone: UTC+4 (AZT)
  - Summer (DST): UTC+5 (AZT)

Qiyaslı (also, Arabkyyasly) is a village and municipality in the Agsu Rayon of Azerbaijan. It has a population of 504.
