= Mais Barkhudarov =

Azerbaijani military officer (born 1976)

- Mais Bərxudarov
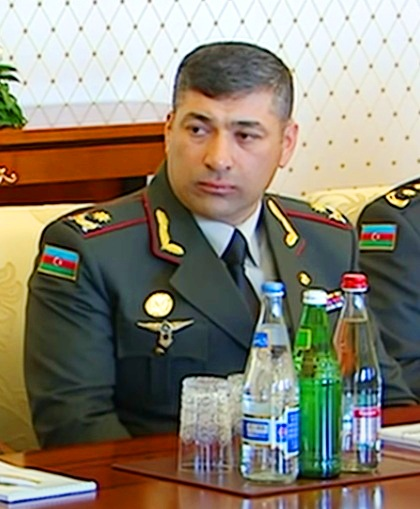
- Born: April 20, 1976 (age 50); Qubadli, Azerbaijan SSR
- Military career
- Allegiance: Azerbaijan
- Branch: Armed Forces of Azerbaijan
- Rank: Lieutenant general
- Commands: 2nd Army Corps
- Conflicts: Four-Day War; Second Nagorno-Karabakh War; Aras Valley campaign; Lachin offensive
- Awards: Azerbaijani Flag Order, "For Homeland" medal

Mais Barkhudarov (Azerbaijani: Mais Bərxudarov) is an Azerbaijani officer, lieutenant general of Armed Forces of Azerbaijan, who was a participant of 2016 Nagorno-Karabakh clashes and 2020 Nagorno-Karabakh war. He was the commander of the 2nd Army Corps of Azerbaijan in October 2014 - October 2024.

== Biography ==
Mais Barkhudarov was born in Qubadli, Azerbaijan SSR and studied at the Jamshid Nakhchivanski Military Lyceum.

In 1998, then Senior Lieutenant Barkhudarov was awarded the Order of Azerbaijani flag. In 2012, Barkhudarov was awarded with the medal "For Homeland."
