= Geghamasar =

Village in Gegharkunik, Armenia

Geghamasar Գեղամասար
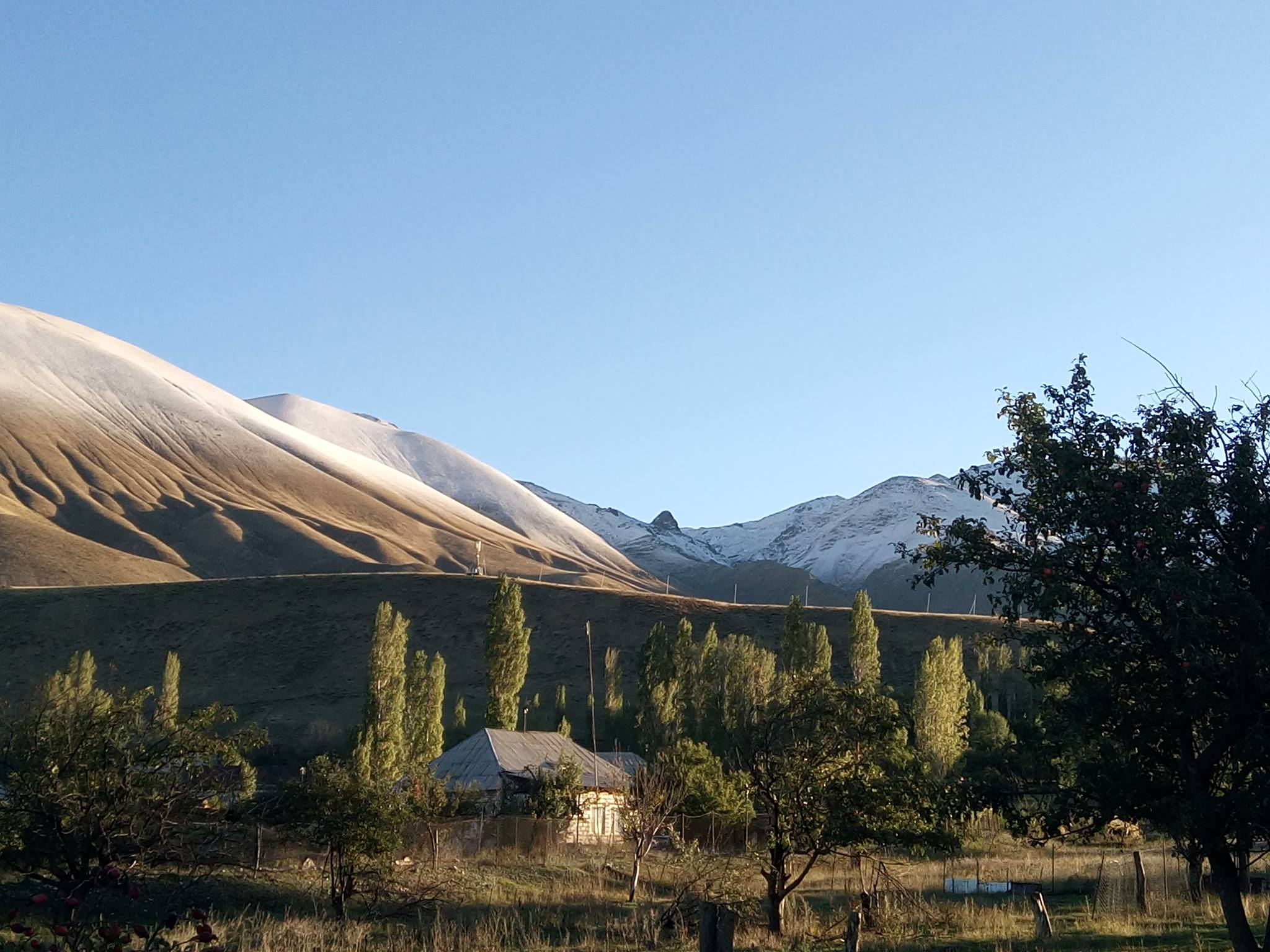
- A view of Geghamasar

- Location within Armenia Location within Gegharkunik
- Coordinates: 40°18′38″N 45°40′45″E
- Country: Armenia
- Province: Gegharkunik
- Municipality: Vardenis
- Elevation: 2,044 m (6,706 ft)

Population (2011)
  - Total: 1,132
- Time zone: UTC+4 (AMT)
- Postal code: 1608

Geghamasar (Armenian: Գեղամասար), known until 8 August 1991 as Shishkaya (Armenian: Շիշկայա), is a village in the Vardenis Municipality of the Gegharkunik Province of Armenia.
