= Mollaməhərrəmli =

- Municipality
- Location within Azerbaijan Location within Karabakh Economic Region
- Coordinates: 39°27′55″N 47°21′51″E
- Country: Azerbaijan
- District: Fuzuli

Population
  - Total: 841
- Time zone: UTC+4 (AZT)

Mollaməhərrəmli (also, Mollamagerramli, Molla-Magerramlu, and Molli-Magerramlu) is a village and municipality in the Fuzuli District of Azerbaijan. It has a population of 841.
