= Əbilcə =

- Location within Azerbaijan
- Coordinates: 39°13′10″N 46°42′23″E
- Country: Azerbaijan
- District: Qubadli

Population (2015)
  - Total: 59
- Time zone: UTC+4 (AZT)

Əbilcə (Abilja) is a village in the Qubadli District of Azerbaijan.

== History ==
The village was located in the Armenian-occupied territories surrounding Nagorno-Karabakh, coming under the control of ethnic Armenian forces during the First Nagorno-Karabakh War in the early 1990s. The village subsequently became part of the breakaway Republic of Artsakh as part of its Kashatagh Province, referred to as Vardabats (Armenian: Վարդաբաց). It was recaptured by Azerbaijan on or around October 28, 2020 during the 2020 Nagorno-Karabakh war.
