= Sarıyataq =

- Location within Azerbaijan Location within East Zangezur Economic Region
- Coordinates: 39°22′37″N 46°39′32″E
- Country: Azerbaijan
- District: Qubadli

Population (2015)
  - Total: 123
- Time zone: UTC+4 (AZT)

Sarıyataq (Sariyatag) is a village in the Qubadli District of Azerbaijan.

== History ==
The village was located in the Armenian-occupied territories surrounding Nagorno-Karabakh, coming under the control of ethnic Armenian forces during the First Nagorno-Karabakh War in the early 1990s. The village subsequently became part of the breakaway Republic of Artsakh as part of its Kashatagh Province, referred to as Saratak (Armenian: Սարատակ). It was recaptured by Azerbaijan during the 2020 Nagorno-Karabakh war.

== Historical heritage sites ==
Historical heritage sites in and around the village include a ram-shaped tombstone.

== Demographics ==
The village had 137 inhabitants in 2005, and 123 inhabitants in 2015.

== Notable people ==
- Kazimagha Karimov — National Hero of Azerbaijan.
