= Milanlı =

- Location within Azerbaijan
- Coordinates: 39°29′12″N 46°43′53″E
- Country: Azerbaijan
- Rayon: Qubadli
- Time zone: UTC+4 (AZT)
  - Summer (DST): UTC+5 (AZT)

Milanlı (also, Milanlu and Milanly) is a Kurdish village in the Qubadli Rayon of Azerbaijan.
