= Mahruzlu, Qubadli =

Mahruzlu
- Location within Azerbaijan
- Coordinates: 39°13′48″N 46°43′07″E
- Country: Azerbaijan
- District: Qubadli
- Time zone: UTC+4 (AZT)
  - Summer (DST): UTC+5 (AZT)

Mahruzlu (also, Mahrızlı and Mahryzly) is a village in the Qubadli District of Azerbaijan.
