= Alaqurşaq =

- Location within Azerbaijan
- Coordinates: 39°14′52″N 46°43′49″E
- Country: Azerbaijan
- Rayon: Qubadli
- Time zone: UTC+4 (AZT)
  - Summer (DST): UTC+5 (AZT)

Alaqurşaq (also, Alakurshak) is a village in the Qubadli Rayon of Azerbaijan.
