= Şükürbəyli, Fuzuli =

Şükürbəyli
- Municipality
- Location within Azerbaijan Location within Karabakh Economic Region
- Coordinates: 39°31′17″N 47°20′08″E
- Country: Azerbaijan
- District: Fuzuli

Population
  - Total: 987
- Time zone: UTC+4 (AZT)

Şükürbəyli (Shukurbeyli) is a village and municipality in the Fuzuli District of Azerbaijan. It has a population of 987.
