= Ağbənd =

- Location within Azerbaijan
- Coordinates: 38°54′00″N 46°34′00″E
- Country: Azerbaijan
- District: Zangilan
- Time zone: UTC+4 (UTC)

Ağbənd (Aghbend) is a town in the Zangilan District of Azerbaijan close to the point at which the borders of Azerbaijan, Armenia and Iran form a politically sensitive junction.

== History ==
Until October 1993, livestock raising and the cultivation of agricultural crops were the main activities of the village. There was a club, a library and a first-aid post. The village came under the control of ethnic Armenian forces in October 1993 during the First Nagorno-Karabakh War. Located in the Armenian-occupied territories surrounding Nagorno-Karabakh, the village subsequently became part of the self-proclaimed Republic of Artsakh as part of its Kashatagh Province, referred to as Aghopen (Armenian: Աղոպեն).

It was recaptured by Azerbaijan on 22 October 2020 during the Aras Valley campaign in the 2020 Nagorno-Karabakh war, which completed the takeover of the Azerbaijan-Iran border.
