= Azerbaijani Navy =

Naval warfare branch of Azerbaijan's military forces

- Azərbaycan Hərbi Dəniz Qüvvələri
- Founded: 1919; 107 years ago
- Country: Azerbaijan
- Type: Navy
- Role: Naval warfare
- Size: 3,000 Personnel and 24 vessels
- Part of: Azerbaijan Armed Forces
- Headquarters: Baku Naval Base (in proximity of Bay of Baku)
- Anniversaries: August 5 (Day of the Azerbaijani Navy)
- Fleet: 1 frigate 13+ patrol vessels 6 landing craft 7 mine warfare ships

Commanders
- Commander-in-Chief: President Ilham Aliyev
- Minister of Defense: Zakir Hasanov
- Commander of Azerbaijani Naval Forces: Rear Admiral Shahin Mammadov

Insignia
- Naval ensign

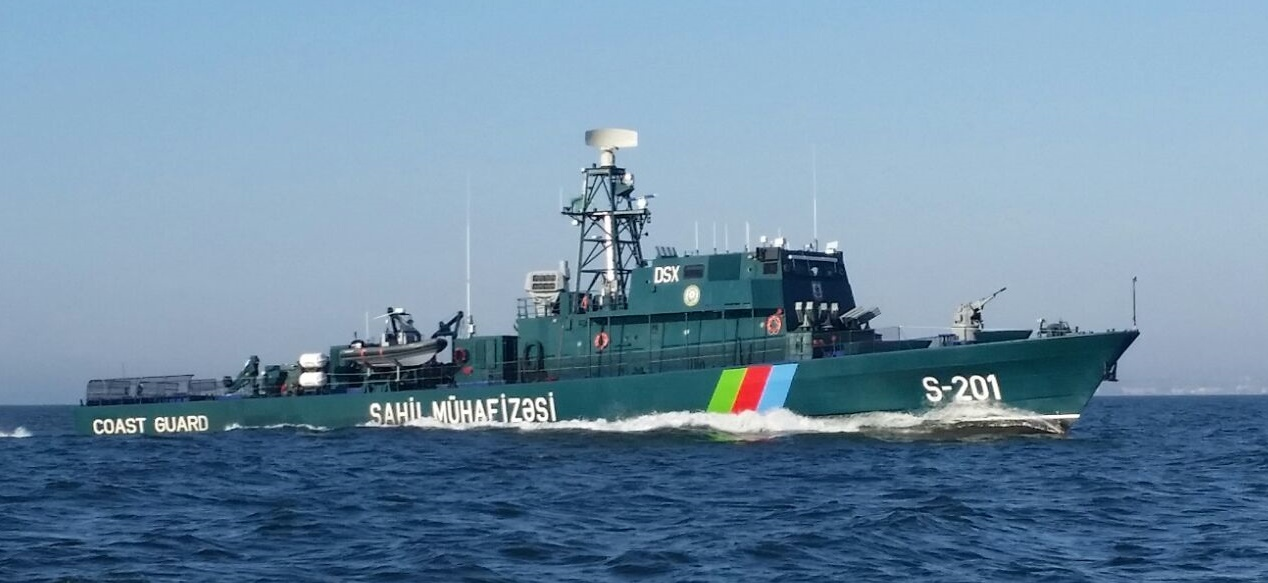
Coast Guard S-201, the Caspian Sea

The Azerbaijan Navy (Azerbaijani: Azərbaycan Hərbi Dəniz Qüvvələri) is the naval branch of the Azerbaijani Armed Forces operating in the Caspian Sea.

== History ==
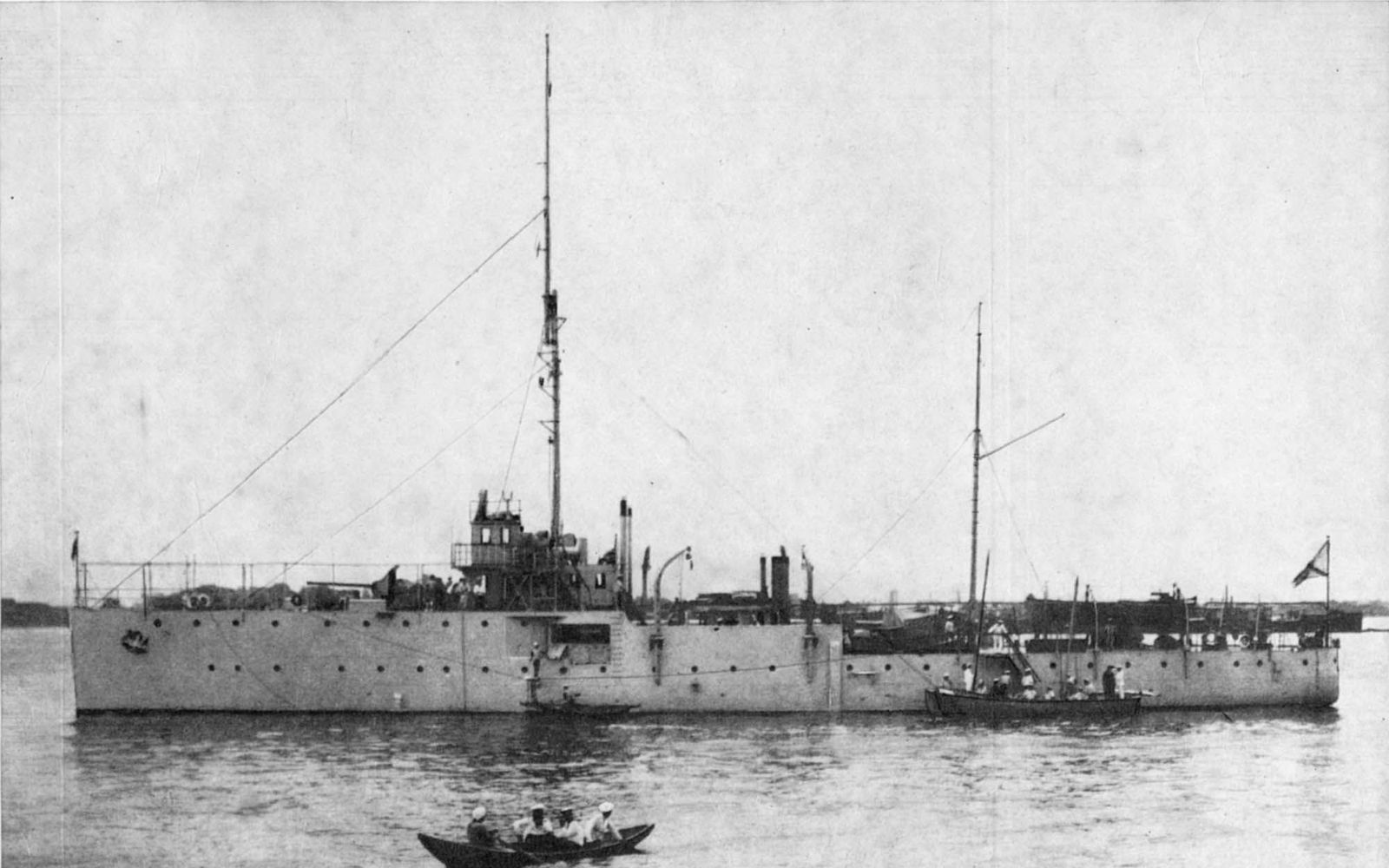
Ardahan cannon boat included in the fleet of the Azerbaijan Democratic Republic.

The inception of Azerbaijani Naval Forces dates back to August 5, 1919, when the government of the Azerbaijan Democratic Republic established the navy force on the basis of the Russian Imperial fleet deployed in the Azerbaijani sector of the Caspian Sea. The navy had 6 ships. After the establishment of Soviet rule in Azerbaijan, the navy was transferred to be under the jurisdiction of the Soviet Navy. In 1991, with the collapse of the Soviet Union, the Azerbaijani fleet of the Soviet Navy was divided between Azerbaijan and the Russian Federation. In July 1992, the Azerbaijani ships were put into operation under Azerbaijani Flag in the Azerbaijani sector of the Caspian Sea. According to the Presidential Decree of Heydar Aliyev from 1996, August 5 was declared the Day of the Azerbaijani Navy. As of today, the Azerbaijani Navy is considered the second strongest navy in the Caspian Sea after the Russian fleet.

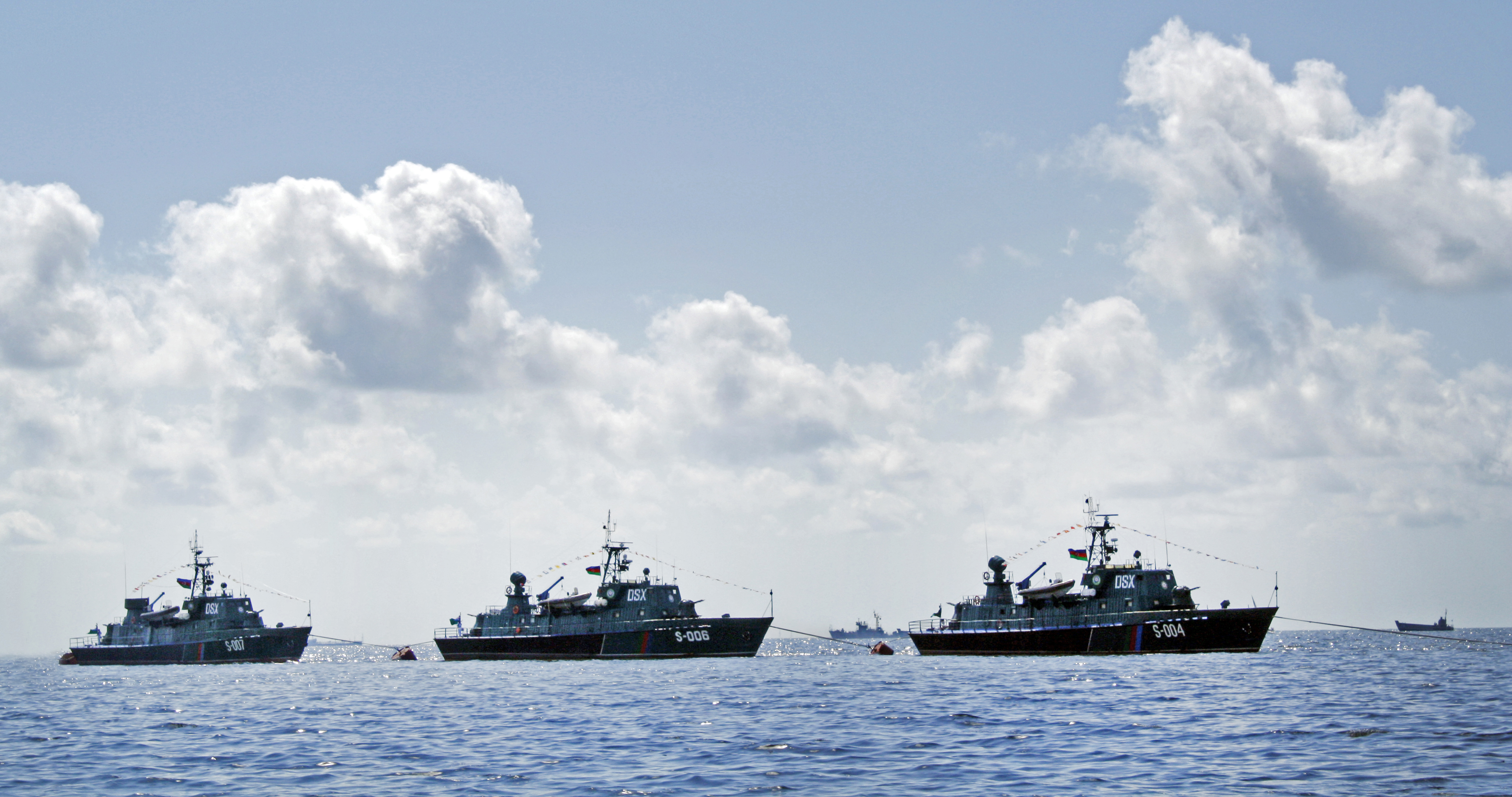
Azerbaijani Navy on Baku Bay during a military parade.

Jane's Fighting Ships said in their entry for the Azerbaijani Navy in their 2001–2002 edition that 'the Coast Guard was formed in July 2002 with ships transferred from the Caspian Flotilla and the Border Guard. By 1995 overall control had been resumed by the Russians in order to provide adequate maintenance and support. The aim is to be independent again in due course.' It named the navy's commander at the time as Captain Rafig Asgarov.

== Organization ==
=== Naval bases and installations ===
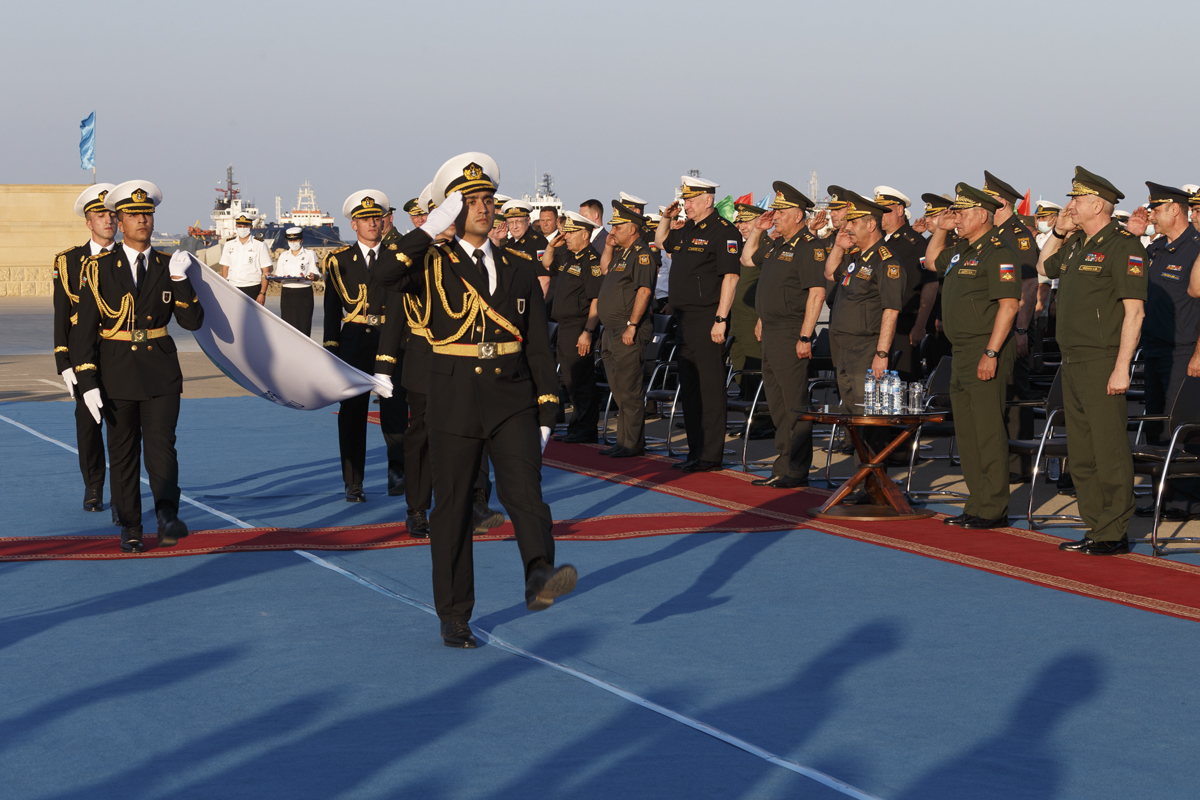
A ceremony at Puta Naval Base.

The navy operates two naval bases: one in Baku (Puta) and one for the Marines in Zığ. The current shipyard is located between Puta and Qaradagh. The Puta Base is the largest military facility in the Caspian Sea basin. Construction began on it in October 2010. It manages the Navy and provides comprehensive control over the surface conditions in the sector of the Caspian Sea belonging to Azerbaijan. There is also a Ship Repair Plant in the Navy. The site of the old Soviet Naval base in Baku is now transformed to non-military use include an arts centre.

=== Unit structure ===
Organizationally, the Azerbaijani Navy includes:

- Main Headquarters
- Surface Ship Brigade
  - Water Area Protection Division
  - Division of Landing Ships
  - Division of Minesweepers
  - Division of Search and Rescue Vessels'
  - Training Courts Division
- Brigade of Patrol Ships
- Marine Infantry
- 641st Naval Special Operations Brigade
- Sea Sabotage and Reconnaissance Brigade
- Reserve
  - Azerbaijan Coast Guard
    - Patrol Ship Brigade
- Mobilization reserve
  - Azerbaijan Merchant Fleet

=== Educational establishments ===
- Faculty of the Navy, Azerbaijan Higher Military Academy (the former Azerbaijan Higher Naval Academy) – training of officers of the fleet and naval units of the border troops
- Training Center of the Azerbaijani Navy – training of warrant officers and foremen of the contract service.

== Equipment ==
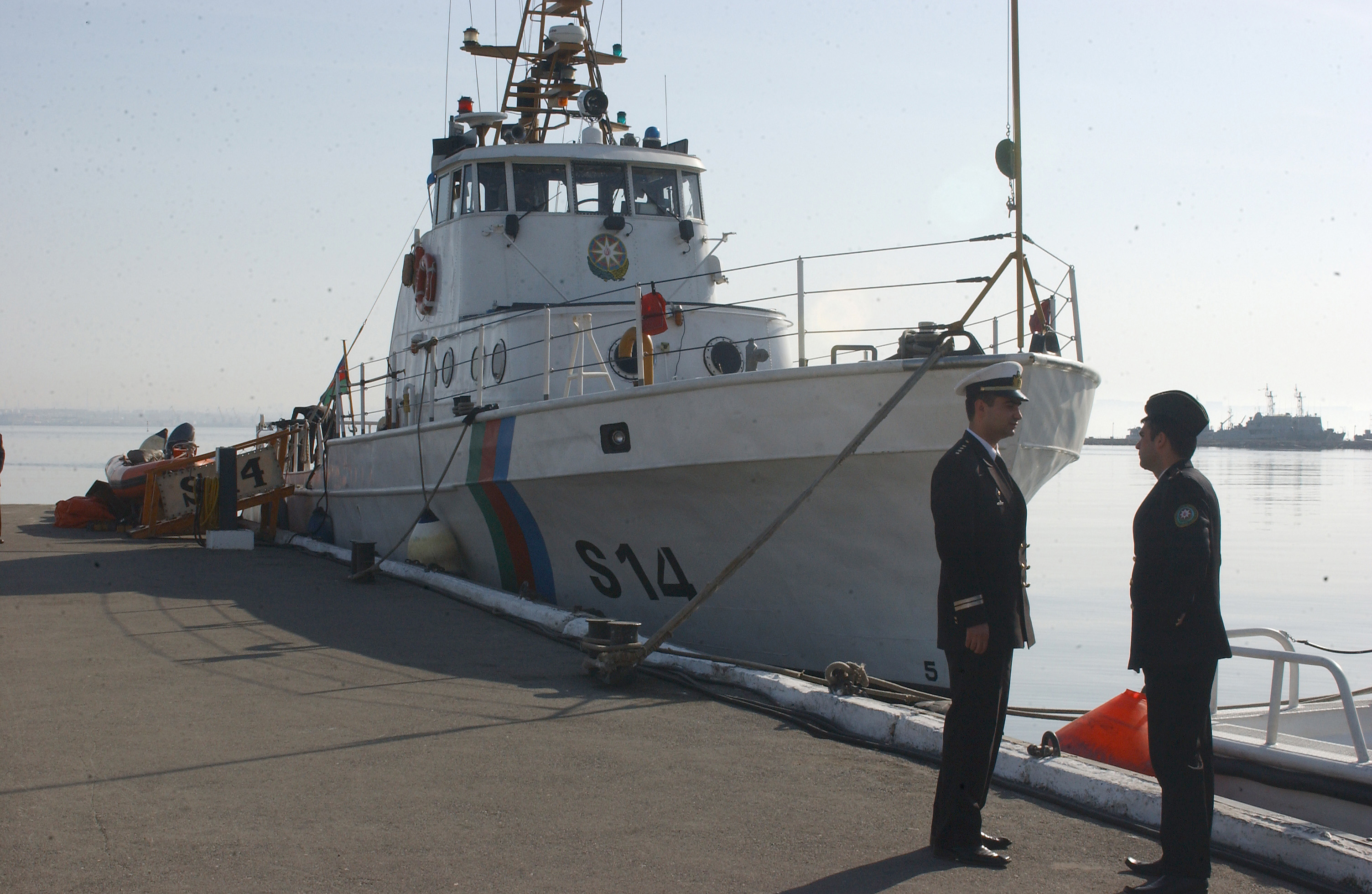
An old U.S. Coast Guard 82-foot (25 m) patrol boat, now part of the Azerbaijani Maritime Brigade, alongside in Baku

| Class (type) | Boat | In service | Type/Role | Notes |
Patrol and coastal combatants
| Petya class | Kusar | 1 | Corvette/Fast attack craft | Ex Petya II class frigate. ARG Gusar(G121) modernised by USA and Turkey. |
| Wodnik class (Project 888) | Luga | 1 | Peace support operation vessel | Wodnik 2. Also used for training. |
| UK-3 training ships | Petrushka | 2 | Patrol ship | Also used for training. |
| Project 1388M | Shelon | 1 | Patrol ship | |
| AB-25 class | Araz | 1 | Patrol boat | Ex Turkish AB-25 |
| Project 722 | Bryza | 1 | Patrol boat | |
| Project 368 | Poluchat | 1 | Patrol boat | |
| Stenka-class | N/A | 3 | Fast patrol boat | |
Landing crafts
| Polnocny-class | Project 770 Project 771 | 2 | Landing ship medium | Polnocny-A and Polnocny-B version |
| Project 1175 | T-4 | 2 | Landing craft tank | |
| Project 1176 | Vydrat | 1 | Landing craft tank | |
Mine warfare
| Sonya-class | Yakhont | 2 | Minesweeper | |
| Yevgenya-class | Korunt | 2 | Minesweeper | Project 1258 |
Logistics and support
| Project B-92 | Neftegaz | 2 | Fleet ocean tug | |
Naval aviation
| CASA/IPTN CN-235 | | 3 | | HC-144A version |
| Eurocopter AS365 Dauphin | | 2 | | |
| Eurocopter AS332 Super Puma | | 1 | | |

== International cooperation ==
=== Cooperation with U.S. ===
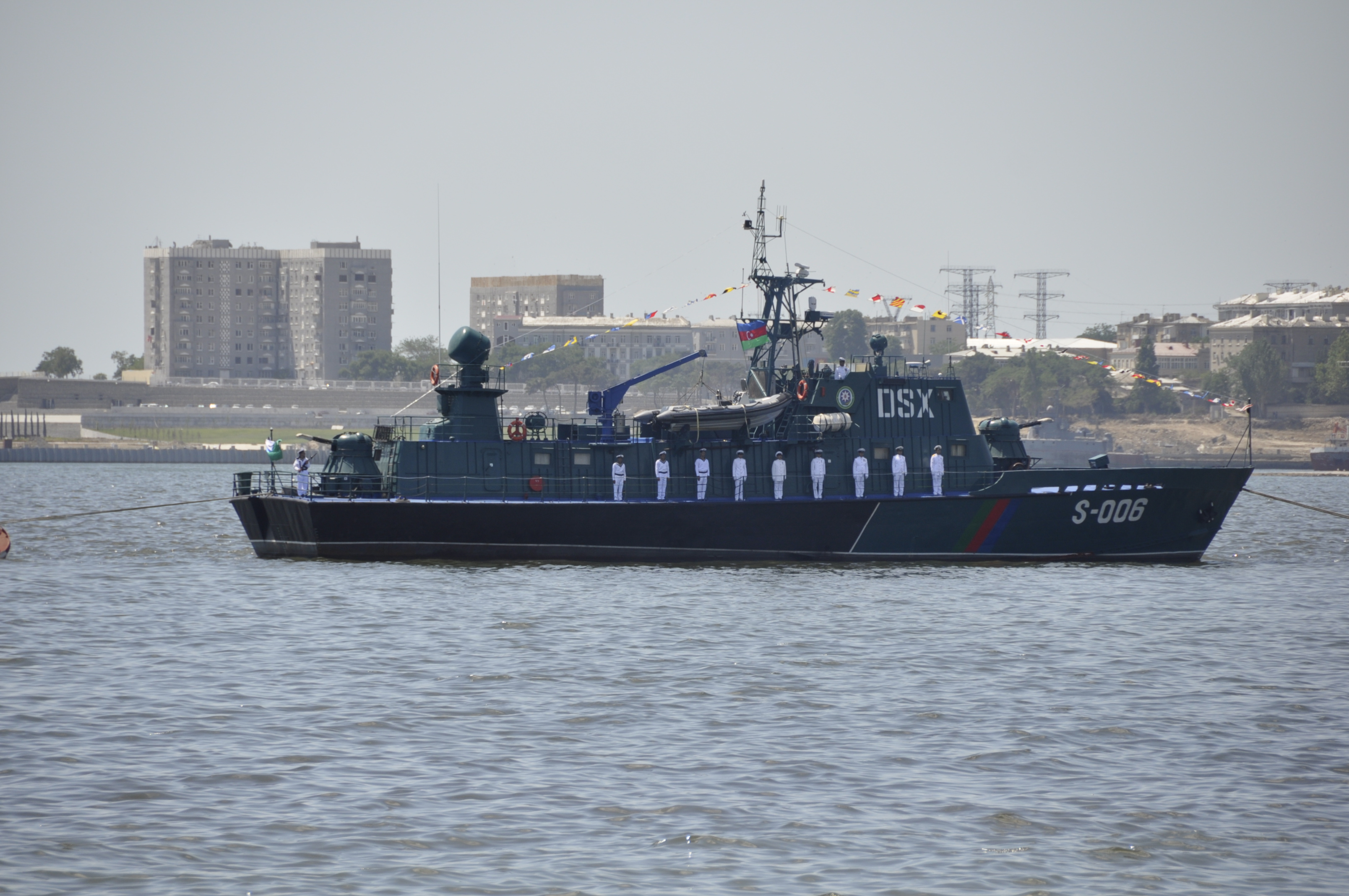
Azerbaijani Navy personnel during a military parade in Baku.

In 2006, the U.S. Government donated three motorboats to the Azerbaijani Navy. There is also an agreement to provide U.S. support to refurbish Azerbaijani warships in the Caspian Sea.

On May 19, 2006, the Azerbaijani and Turkish Navy held a joint military exercise on safeguarding the security of oil and gas pipelines in Baku. The training session was observed by Azerbaijan Navy commander Shahin Sultanov and Turkish Armed Forces attaché Seyhan Ceyhan. The activities aimed to ensure the safety of the Baku-Tbilisi-Ceyhan pipeline (BTC), the main export pipeline to take Caspian oil to Turkey and further on to world markets, as well as on expanding cooperation between the two countries’ military forces. The exercises started with the clearance of mines on the seabed. This was followed by rendering harmless the traps planted in the area by symbolic terrorists. The training concluded with the practice of maritime and air operations.

In 2007, an agreement between the Azerbaijani Navy and a U.S. military company was concluded, which stated that a part of the Azerbaijani Navy would be equipped with advanced laser marksmanship devices/systems. U.S. company specialists were also due to give training for the use of this new equipment.

=== Caspian Guard Initiative ===
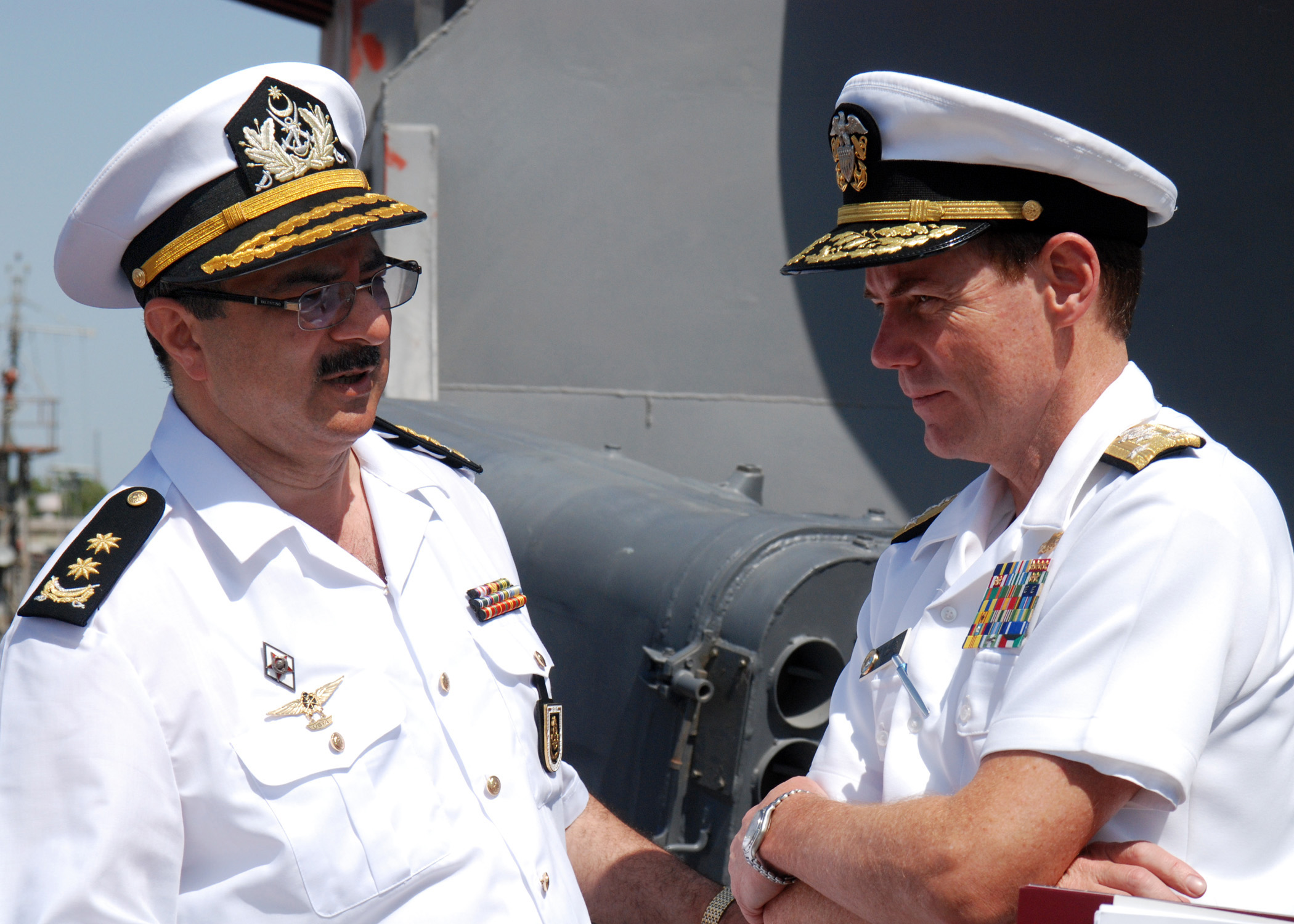
Vice Admiral Kevin Cosgriff, commander, U.S. Naval Forces Central Command, meets with Vice Admiral Shahin Sultanov in Baku, Azerbaijan

The Caspian Guard Initiative is a framework program designed to coordinate activities in Azerbaijan and Kazakhstan with those of U.S. Central Command and other U.S. government agencies to enhance Caspian security. The initiative assists the two countries in improving their ability to prevent and, if needed, respond to terrorism, nuclear proliferation, drug and human trafficking, and other transnational threats in the Caspian region. EUCOM is responsible for operations in Azerbaijan.

== Ranks and insignia ==
=== Commissioned officer ranks ===
The rank insignia of commissioned officers.

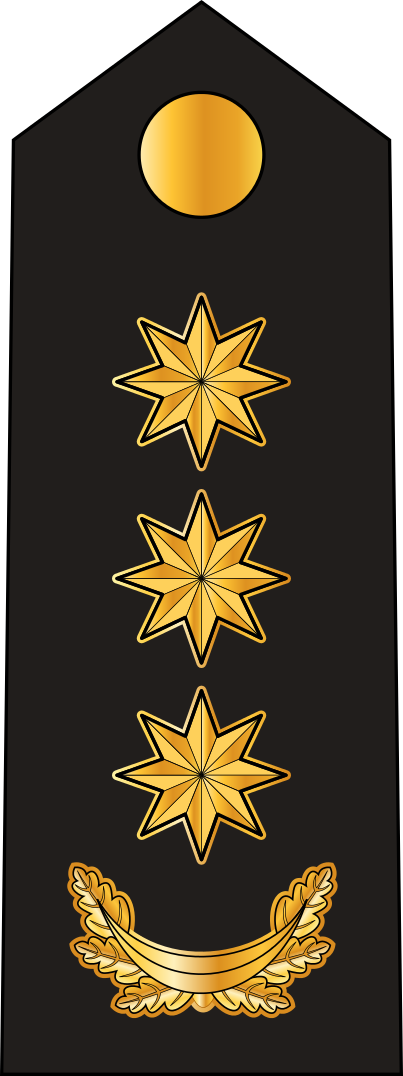
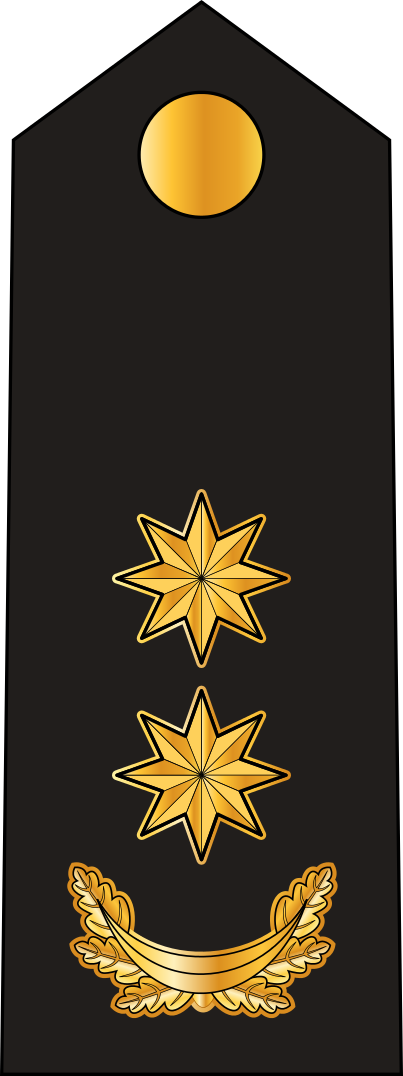
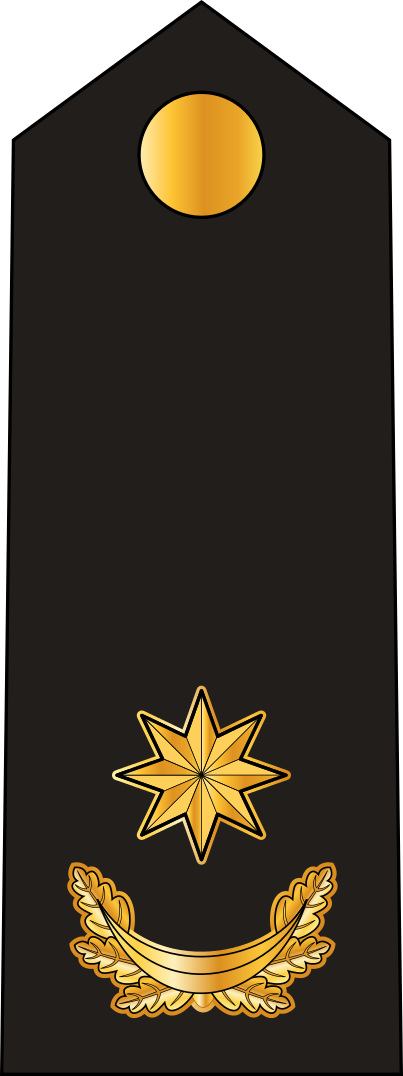
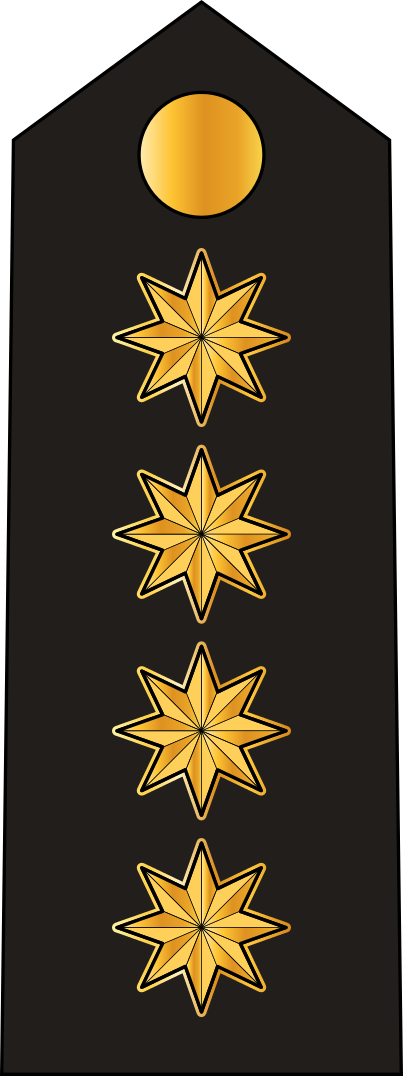
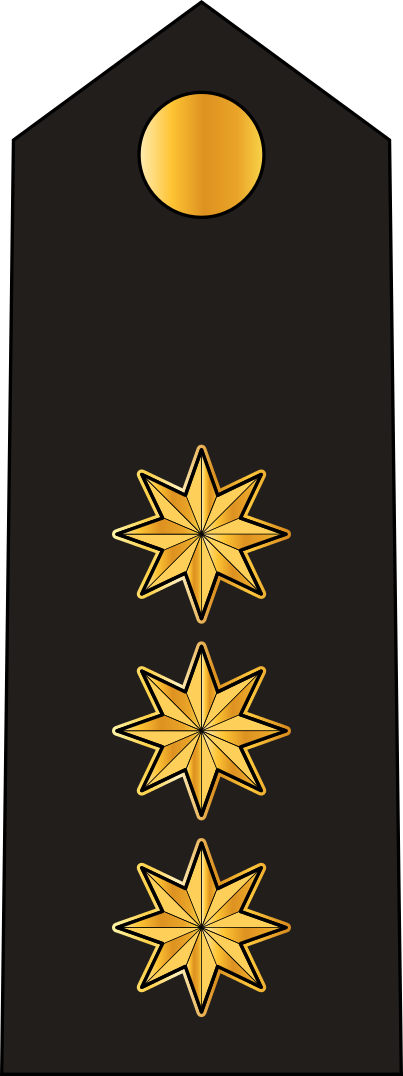
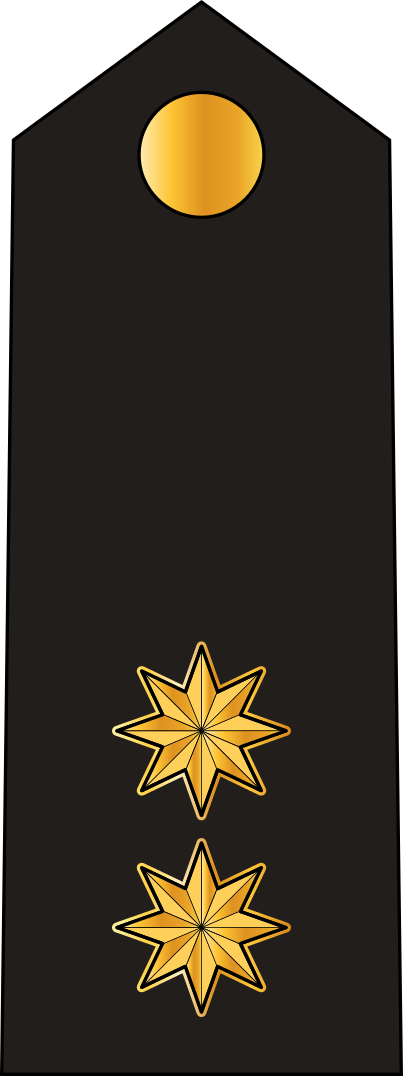
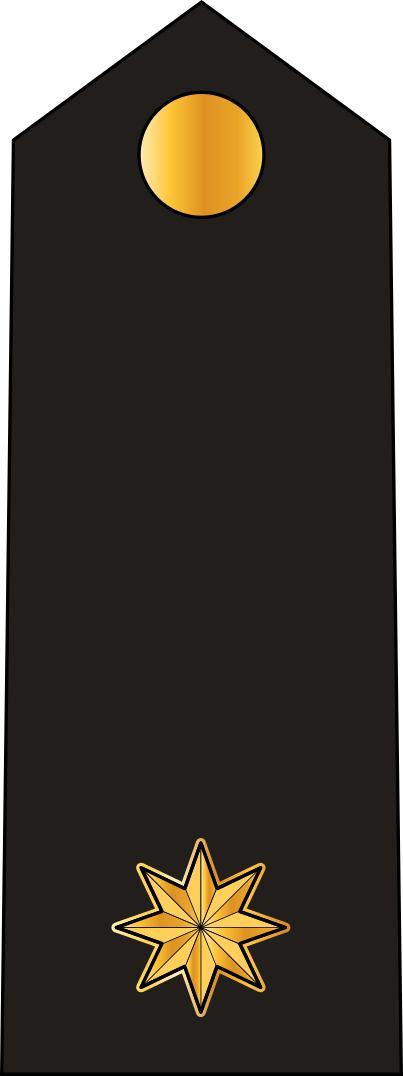
| Rank group | General / flag officers | | | Senior officers | | | Junior officers |
|---|---|---|---|---|---|---|---|---|---|---|
| Azerbaijani Navy |
| Azerbaijani Navy | Admiral | Vitse-admiral | Kontr-admiral | Birinci dərəcəli kapitan | Ikinci dərəcəli kapitan | Üçüncü dərəcəli kapitan | Kapitan-leytenant | Baş leytenant | Leytenant | Kiçik leytenant |

=== Other ranks ===
The rank insignia of non-commissioned officers and enlisted personnel.

| Rank group | Senior NCOs | | | | | | Junior NCOs | Enlisted |
|---|---|---|---|---|---|---|---|---|
| Azerbaijani Navy | | | | | | | | No insigna |
| Azerbaijani Navy | Baş miçman | Miçman | Kiçik miçman | Baş çavuş | Çavuş | Kiçik çavuş | Baş matros | Matros |

== See also ==
- Azerbaijani Armed Forces
- Chief of General Staff of Azerbaijani Armed Forces
