= Polad Hashimov =

Azerbaijani military officer (1975–2020)

National Hero of Azerbaijan Polad Hashimov
- Born: January 2, 1975; Vandam, Gutgashen District, Azerbaijan SSR, Soviet Union
- Died: July 14, 2020 (aged 45) near Tovuz District, Azerbaijan
- Burial place: Second Alley of Honor
- Alma mater: Baku Higher Combined Arms Command School; Azerbaijan Higher Military Academy; Tuzla Infantry School
- Spouse: Ophelia Salmanova
- Children: three
- Military career
- Allegiance: Azerbaijan
- Branch: Azerbaijani Land Forces
- Service years: 1992–2020
- Rank: Major general
- Nickname: General of the Trenches
- Commands: 1st Army Corps (deputy; 2016); 3rd Army Corps (deputy; 2017–2020)
- Conflicts: First Nagorno-Karabakh War; Battle of Aghdam; Operation Murovdagh; Four-Day War; Tovuz clashes †
- Awards: Gold Star Medal (posthumous)

Polad Israyil oghlu Hashimov (Azerbaijani: Polad İsrayıl oğlu Həşimov; 2 January 1975 – 14 July 2020) was an Azerbaijani military officer, National Hero of Azerbaijan and a major general who served as the Deputy Commander and the Chief of Staff of the 3rd Army Corps of the Azerbaijani Armed Forces.

Hashimov was a popular military figure who took part in the First Nagorno-Karabakh War and the Four-Day War. He was awarded numerous honours during his military career, including jubilee and other medals. He commanded the Azerbaijani forces during the border clashes with Armenia in July 2020 and was killed on the morning of 14 July while fighting on the front-line in the Tovuz District of Azerbaijan. His death sparked violent protests throughout the country calling for war with Armenia, a prelude to the 2020 Nagorno-Karabakh war, which began in September of the same year. He was awarded the title of National Hero of Azerbaijan posthumously in December 2020.

Hashimov is the first and only general of the Azerbaijani Armed Forces to be killed during battle. Before him, Ismat Gayibov, the first Prosecutor General of Azerbaijan, and Mahammad Asadov, a major general in the Azerbaijani Ministry of Internal Affairs, were killed in November 1991 when the Mil Mi-8 helicopter they were in was shot down by Armenian forces.

== Early life and education ==
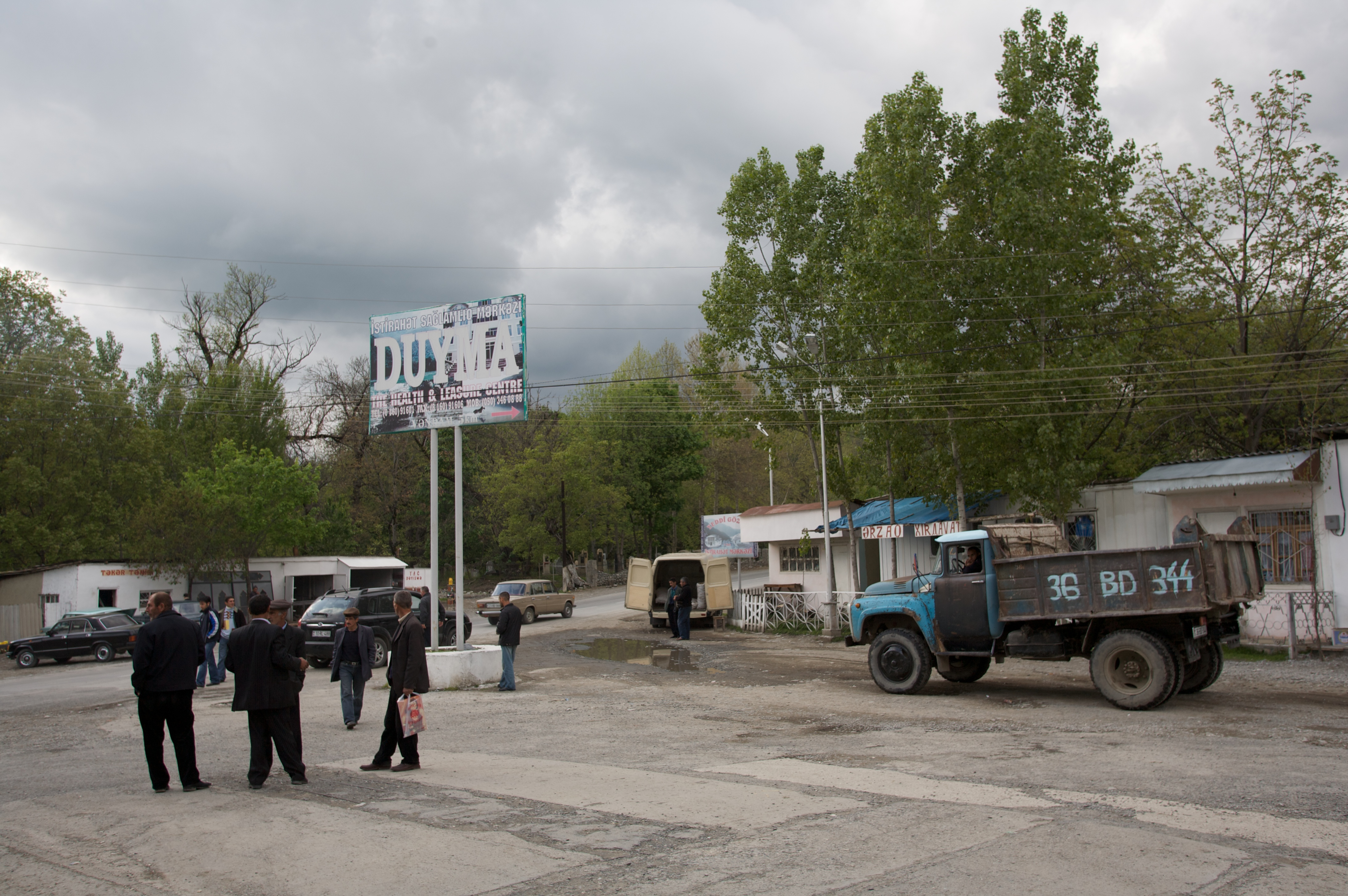
Hashimov was born in a working class family in Vandam, Soviet Azerbaijan, though he moved to the industrial city of Sumgayit with his family at a very young age.

Polad Israyil oglu Hashimov was born on 2 January 1975, in Vandam, Gutgashen District (modern-day Gabala District) of the Azerbaijani SSR, then part of the Soviet Union. His father, Israyil, was a metallurgist and worked at an aluminum plant in Sumgayit, first as an engineer, then as a shift supervisor and manager. He died in 2005 after a lengthy illness. His mother, Samaya, worked at the same plant. Hashimov's grandfather, Mikayil, a World War II veteran, named him "Polad"—steel in Azerbaijani. In July 1976, when Hashimov was one and a half years old, his family moved to Sumgayit and settled in the city's 13th micro-district.

Hashimov was admitted to secondary school No. 28 in Sumgayit in 1982, and then to Secondary School No. 33 after its construction in 1986. In 1988, another educational institution, Secondary School No. 34, named after Mikayil Mushfig, was built in the area and Hashimov continued his education there graduating in 1992. Hashimov excelled in mathematics during his secondary education.

Despite intending to be a lawyer, Hashimov decided instead to pursue a military career in 1992 during the height of the First Nagorno-Karabakh War. With his father's consent, he submitted his documents and was accepted to the Baku Higher Combined Arms Command School in August of that year. He graduated in 1995 with a degree in motorised infantry. In 1994, he was sent by the Azerbaijani Ministry of Defence to a three-month training course at the Tuzla Infantry School in Istanbul, Turkey. In July 2014, he entered the Azerbaijan Higher Military Academy named after Heydar Aliyev, and in 2016, received a master's degree in military leadership.

== Military career ==
=== First Nagorno-Karabakh War ===
In November 1992, during the First Nagorno-Karabakh War, Hashimov, who was training with the 702nd Motorised Rifle Brigade, fought in the successful defence of the villages of Marzili and Novruzlu in the Aghdam District of Azerbaijan. He participated in Operation Murovdagh in February 1994. He was involved in clashes with Armenian forces in the Guzgu, Koroghlu, and Omar military posts in the Murov range.

After the signing of the Bishkek Protocol ending the First Nagorno-Karabakh War, Hashimov served in military units stationed on the front-line of the ongoing Nagorno-Karabakh conflict between Armenia and the self-declared Republic of Artsakh. For many years he was the commander of the military units stationed in Barda, Dashkasan, Haji Zeynalabdin, Murov and Shamkir. From 1995 to 2017, Hashimov held various positions, from motorised rifle squadron commander to military unit commander. He was promoted to major in 2003, and to lieutenant colonel in 2009.

=== Four-Day War ===
On 1 April 2016, heavy fighting broke out between the Azerbaijani and Armenian forces along the Nagorno-Karabakh Line of Contact, known as the Four-Day War. During the clashes, Hashimov served as Deputy Commander and Chief of Staff of the 1st Army Corps. He commanded the Azerbaijani forces stationed in Tartar District, and during night operations, his forces advanced towards Talish, capturing several strategic locations. He was wounded during the clashes. One of the military posts Hashimov seized near Talış was later renamed "Polad" in his honour. According to Turkish military expert Abdullah Ağar, the Azerbaijani military command ordered Hashimov to withdraw from the territories he had seized during the hostilities. After a ceasefire was reached on the front-line, Hashimov resigned immediately, but the president of Azerbaijan, Ilham Aliyev, intervened and did not allow him to resign.

In 2017, Hashimov was appointed Deputy Commander and Chief of Staff of the 3rd Army Corps. On 24 June 2019, President Aliyev promoted Hashimov to major general, the highest military rank in the Azerbaijani Army. Hashimov became the first Gabalani general since Ismayil bek Kutkashensky, a 19th-century Azerbaijani military officer in the Imperial Russian Army.

=== Tovuz clashes ===
On 12 July 2020, skirmishes erupted on the border between Armenia and Azerbaijan, mainly in the Tavush Province of Armenia and the Tovuz District of Azerbaijan.

Hashimov commanded the Azerbaijani forces during the clashes. In the first hours of the hostilities, three Azerbaijani servicemen were killed and four more were wounded. These clashes continued the next day using artillery and drone attacks, without infantry. Azerbaijani authorities claimed their forces had "neutralised" more than 20 Armenian servicemen, and destroyed several Armenian firing positions, battalion headquarters, and other military targets. Overall, at least 17 military personnel and one civilian were confirmed killed during the skirmishes.

== Death ==
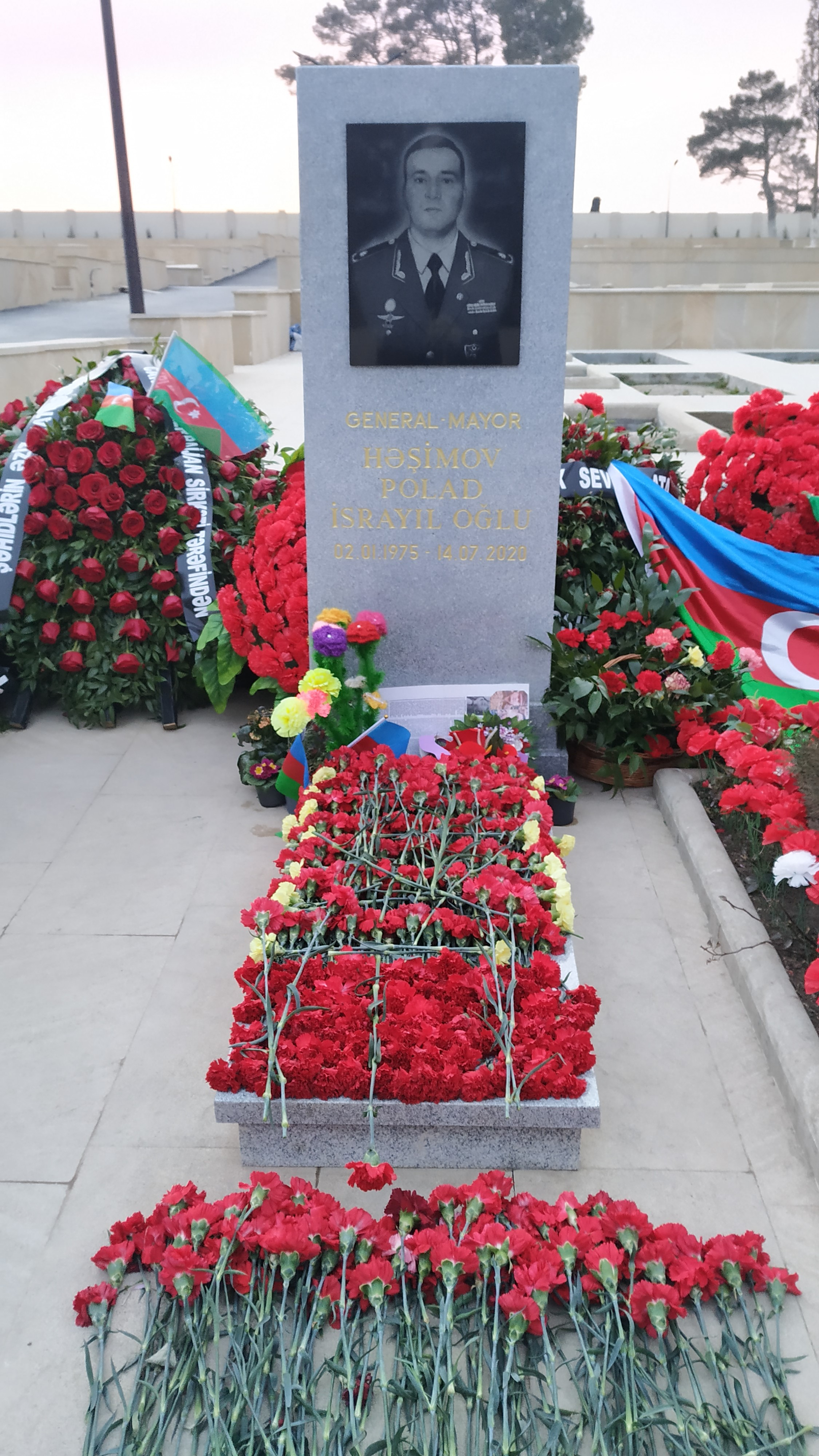
Hashimov's grave in the Second Alley of Honor in Baku.

Further skirmishes occurred at night and continued into the morning of 14 July. In the morning, seven Azerbaijani servicemen, six of them officers, were killed. On the same day, the deputy defence minister of Azerbaijan, Karim Valiyev, announced that Hashimov and Colonel Ilgar Mirzayev were among the fallen Azerbaijani officers.

Hashimov is the first and only general of the Azerbaijani Armed Forces to be killed during military operations. Before him, Ismat Gayibov, the first Prosecutor General of Azerbaijan, and Mahammad Asadov, major general in the Azerbaijani Ministry of Internal Affairs, were killed in November 1991 when the Mil Mi-8 helicopter they were in was shot down by Armenian forces.

=== Funeral ===
At noon on 14 July, Hashimov's body was taken to Vandam and then to Sumgayit, where he lived. He was buried alongside Colonel Mirzayev, on 15 July in the Second Alley of Honor in Baku. Azerbaijan's minister of defence, Zakir Hasanov, chief of general staff, Najmaddin Sadigov, and, the mayor of Baku, Eldar Azizov, attended the funeral. On the same day, President Ilham Aliyev had a telephone conversation with Hashimov's mother, expressing his deep condolences to her.

=== Domestic reactions ===
Hashimov's death caused outrage in Azerbaijani society. Many speculated that his exact location was given to the Armenian side by a sleeper agent, the primary suspect being Najmeddin Sadikov, Azerbaijan's chief of staff and the deputy minister of defence. This sparked violent protests throughout the country.

When Hashimov's body was taken to his house in Sumgayit, a crowd of hundreds of people from different parts of the city gathered there chanting pro-army slogans. The demonstrations spread to others parts of Baku, with about 50,000 demonstrators taking part. They first marched to Freedom Square, then to the Martyrs' Lane but were not allowed to enter it, or the National Assembly of Azerbaijan. The Baku Police prevented vehicles from entering the area to ensure the crowd's safety. The demonstrators, waving the Azerbaijani flag, called for the end of the COVID-19 pandemic related quarantine, mobilisation and a war against Armenia to retake the disputed Nagorno-Karabakh region. There were smaller rallies in support of the military in other cities around Azerbaijan, usually connected to the burials of fallen soldiers.

After the initial demonstrations, a smaller group reached the front of the National Assembly on the night of 14 and 15 July. Apart from support for the army and calls for war, the demonstrators demanded the resignation of the chief of general staff of the Azerbaijani Armed Forces and the deputy minister of defence, Najmeddin Sadikov. At around 01:00, the street lights in front of the parliament building were turned off. However, the demonstrators protested this by turning on their phone lights and whistling. Although a representative from the Azerbaijani Ministry of Defence arrived to address the crowd, the demonstrators did not allow him to speak and demanded that President Ilham Aliyev come and speak. At around 04:00, riots broke out, during which police cars were overturned. Several demonstrators breached the National Assembly, protesting the government's inaction. They smashed windows and chandeliers inside, but security forces later evicted them. A BBC Azerbaijani Service correspondent at the scene reported that although there were guards inside, they did not interfere with the crowd. According to a report by the Azerbaijani Parliament, the demonstrators damaged a number of items in the building worth 22,150 AZN ($13,000 US) in total. The Azerbaijani Ministry of Internal Affairs accused the demonstrators of deliberately disobeying the demands of police officers and attacking them with stones and other objects. As a result, seven police officers were injured, two State Traffic Police Department service cars were overturned and rendered useless, fourteen more service cars and the road infrastructure in the area were seriously damaged. Following this, security forces used water cannons, tear gas and batons to disperse those gathered in front of the parliament building. Other demonstrators tried to convince the police to join them. The demonstrators moved towards Martyrs' Lane and continued protesting there. They began to disperse in the early morning near Baku Boulevard and Freedom Square. According to Turan, an independent Azerbaijani news agency, several hundred protesters then marched, escorted by police, to the Nariman Narimanov Monument and the building of the Azerbaijani Ministry of Taxes, before dispersing. In late July, further protests erupted in Hashimov's native Vandam, when local officials removed the Azerbaijani flag hanging from the door of Hashimov's house. Ilham Baghirov, the representative of the Gabala District Executive Power in Vandam, stated that the flag was removed temporarily and was to be hung on a flag pole in front of the house.

The preliminary investigation over the arrests was completed on 11 September. 37 people were prosecuted, officially charged with intentionally causing minor bodily harm, intentionally destroying or damaging another's property, violating public order, and resisting or using force against a government official. Despite this, according to other Azerbaijani sources, as many as 120 people were detained after the protests, including members of the NIDA Civic Movement and journalists.

The protests were a key factor in the escalation of tensions that led to the Second Nagorno-Karabakh War later in September of the same year.

Later, in January 2022, Hashimov's mother, Samaya Hashimova, alleged that Karim Valiyev, who was appointed Chief of the General Staff of the Azerbaijani Armed Forces in July 2021, had her son killed in order to get the position instead of him. She also blamed Defence Minister Zakir Hasanov.

== Personal life ==
Hashimov had three siblings, Arzu, Kamala, and Ilham. He married Ophelia Salmanova on 5 September 2003. The couple had three children, Davoud, Teimour, and Aybaniz.

A popular military figure within the Azerbaijani society, Hashimov was well respected by both soldiers and officers. He was presented with an apartment for his services during the Four-Day War. Although Hashimov lived in a rented apartment, he donated it to the family of a fallen Azerbaijani serviceman.

== Legacy ==
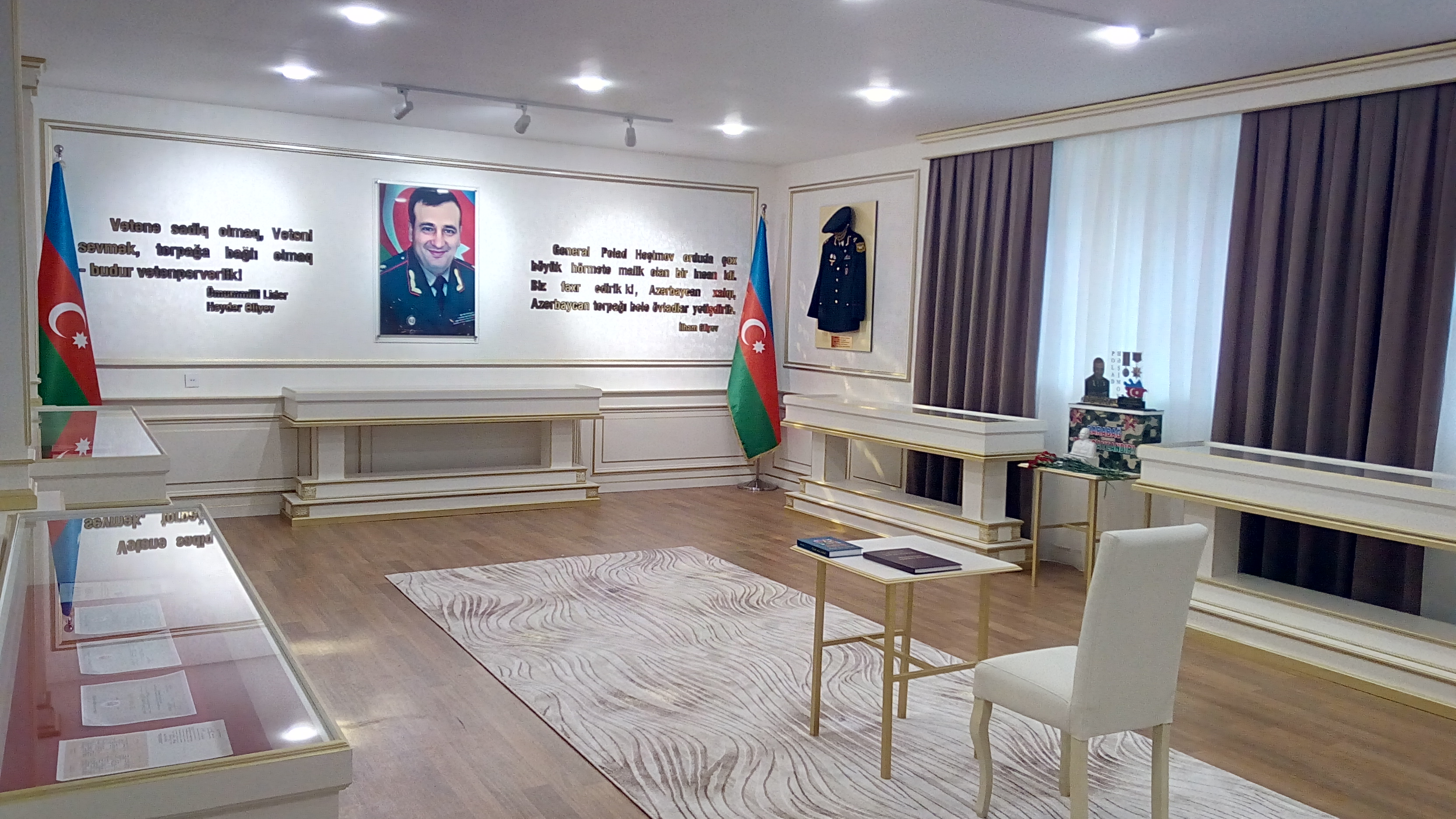
Polad Hashimov Memorial Museum in Sumgayit

After Hashimov's death, "Polad" was the most popular name given to newborn boys, mainly in the Gabala District.

In August 2020, two books dedicated to Hashimov were published. Our Steel General (Azerbaijani: Polad Generalımız) was published by Ganun Nashriyyati. The second, written by Hadaf Nashrlari and XAN Nashriyyati, General Polad Hashimov in Memories (Azerbaijani: General Polad Həşimov xatirələrdə), contains the recollections of Hashimov's mother, wife, daughter, as well as his colleagues.

After his death, the Azerbaijani singer Chingiz Mustafayev, who represented Azerbaijan in the 2019 Eurovision Song Contest, released a song titled I'm Like My Homeland (Azerbaijani: Vətənim Kimiyəm), dedicated to Hashimov and the other fallen soldiers of the border clashes. On 22 August 2020, Azerbaijani military singer Shamistan Alizamanli released a song titled My Pasha, Hey! (Azerbaijani: Paşam, hey!) dedicated to Hashimov. On 24 August, a documentary titled 7 Moments of Polad (Azerbaijani: Poladın 7 anı) dedicated to the life of Hashimov and directed by Ruslan Hussein was presented on Ictimai TV.

In August 2020, a street was named after Hashimov in his native Vandam, in Gabala District, and in January 2021, in Guba, and in Keban, Elazığ, Turkey. A park bearing his name was opened in the Osmangazi District of Bursa, Turkey, on 28 October. On May 7, 2021, the street in Baku, originally named after Pavel Nakhimov, was named after Polad Hashimov.

Hashimov was declared a National Hero of Azerbaijan in December 2020, along with Ilgar Mirzayev and Ibad Huseynov, by the decree of President Aliyev.

== Awards ==
Throughout his military career, Hashimov received numerous promotions and was awarded more than twelve times, including jubilee and other medals. In April 2021, Iranian embassy in Azerbaijan visited Hashimov's family and posthumously awarded Hashimov with the World Sacrifice Award named after Qasem Soleimani. Despite this, Hashimov's mother refused to take this award.

- (2001) — Jubilee medal "10th anniversary of the Armed Forces of the Republic of Azerbaijan".
- (2002) — Medal "For impeccable service" III degree.
- (2003) — For military services medal.
- (2008) — Jubilee medal "90th anniversary of the Armed Forces of the Republic of Azerbaijan".
- (2004) — Medal "For Distinguished Service" III degree.
- (2006) — Medal "For Distinguished Service" II degree.
- (2007) — Medal "For impeccable service" II degree.
- (2009) — Medal "For the Fatherland".
- (2012) — Medal "For impeccable service" I degree.
- (2013) — Jubilee medal "95th Anniversary of the Armed Forces of Azerbaijan".
- (2014) — Order "For service to the Fatherland" III degree.
- (2016) — Order "For service to the Fatherland" II degree.
- (2017) — Medal "Veteran of the Armed Forces of the Republic of Azerbaijan".
- (2018) — Jubilee medal "100th anniversary of the Azerbaijani Army".
- (2020) — National Hero of Azerbaijan (posthumously).
- (2020) — Gold Star Medal (posthumously).
- World Sacrifice Award (posthumously; given by Iranian embassy; refused)
