= Haydar Piriyev =

Azerbaijani military officer

Heydər Piriyev
- Heydər Kamal oğlu Piriyev
- Born: Haydar Kamal oglu Piriyev; 1 September 1959 (age 67); Vorontsovka District, Armenian Soviet Socialist Republic, Soviet Union
- Military career
- Allegiance: Azerbaijani Armed Forces
- Rank: Lieutenant general
- Commands: War College of the Azerbaijani Armed Forces
- Conflicts: First Nagorno-Karabakh War; Second Nagorno-Karabakh War
- Awards: Azerbaijani Flag Order; For military services medal; "10th Anniversary of the Armed Forces of Azerbaijan (1991–2001)" Medal; "90th Anniversary of the Armed Forces of Azerbaijan (1918–2008)" Medal; "95th Anniversary of the Armed Forces of Azerbaijan (1918–2013)" Medal; Azerbaijani Army 100th anniversary medal

Heydar Kamal oglu Piriyev (Azerbaijani: Heydər Kamal oğlu Piriyev) is an Azerbaijani military officer and lieutenant general of the Azerbaijani Armed Forces. He is a veteran of the First Nagorno-Karabakh War and the 2020 Nagorno-Karabakh war. He is the current Chief of the War College of the Azerbaijani Armed Forces

== Early life and education ==
Heydar Piriyev was born on 1 September 1959 in the Paghaghbyur village of the Vorontsovka District of the then Armenian SSR. In 1974-1976, he studied at the 1st Physics and Mathematics School in Baku. He was born on September 17, 1959. In 1976-1980 he studied at the Baku Higher Combined Arms Command School. In 1998 he graduated from War College of the Azerbaijani Armed Forces.

== Military service ==
In 1980-1991 he served in various positions in the Soviet Army. Since 1991, he has served in the Azerbaijan Armed Forces. From 1992-1994, he participated in the First Nagorno-Karabakh War. On 17 May 2003 by the decree of the Azerbaijani President Haydar Aliyev, Piriyev was awarded the rank of Major General. From 2002-2009, Piriyev served as Chief of Azerbaijan Higher Military Academy. From 2009-2013, he served as Chief of Staff of the Army Corps in the Nakhchivan Autonomous Republic. In 2014, Haydar Piriyev was awarded the rank of Lieutenant general by the decree of Azerbaijani President Ilham Aliyev and he was appointed Chief of the War College of the Azerbaijani Armed Forces.

== Awards ==
- — Azerbaijani Flag Order
- — For military services medal
- — "10th Anniversary of the Armed Forces of Azerbaijan (1991–2001)" Medal
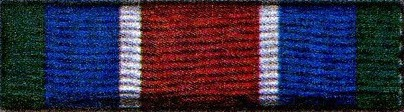
- — "90th Anniversary of the Armed Forces of Azerbaijan (1918–2008)" Medal
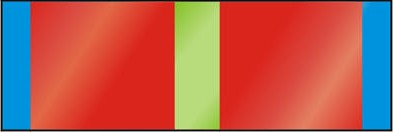
- — "95th Anniversary of the Armed Forces of Azerbaijan (1918–2013)" Medal
- — Azerbaijani Army 100th anniversary medal

== See also ==
- Hikmat Mirzayev
- Tehran Mansimov
