= 2020 Azerbaijani protests =

Series of demonstrations in Azerbaijan in July 2020

- Part of July 2020 Armenian–Azerbaijani clashes
- Date: 12 – 15 July 2020 (3 days)
- Location: Major: Baku, Sumgayit, Gobu; Minor: Throughout Azerbaijan
- Caused by: July 2020 Armenian–Azerbaijani clashes; Deaths of Polad Hashimov and Ilgar Mirzayev; Nagorno-Karabakh conflict; Military corruption; Government-imposed lockdowns
- Goals: War against Armenia; Country-wide mobilisation; Ending COVID-19 lockdowns in Azerbaijan; Resignation of Najmeddin Sadikov
- Methods: Demonstrations, civil disobedience, civil resistance, occupation, rioting, vandalism, looting
- Result: Prosecution of opposition members; 2020 Nagorno-Karabakh war

Parties
(Azerbaijan) Pro-war demonstrators Alleged: Popular Front Party National Council of Democratic Forces	(Azerbaijan) Azerbaijani government; Ministry of Internal Affairs; Azerbaijani police; Rapid Police Unit

Lead figures
None	(Azerbaijan) Ilham Aliyev (Azerbaijan) Sahiba Gafarova (Azerbaijan) Vilayat Eyvazov

Number
Gobu: 700–800 (12 July); Baku: 30–50 thousand	Unknown

Casualties and losses
120 people detained 37 people arrested	7 police officers injured

The 2020 Azerbaijani protests, also known within Azerbaijan as the Karabakh March (Azerbaijani: Qarabağ yürüşü), were series of civil protests from 12 to 15 July in various cities and towns in Azerbaijan. They erupted during the Armenian–Azerbaijani border clashes, with the protestors demanding full-scale war with Armenia over the Nagorno-Karabakh conflict.

Initial protests erupted on 12 July, in Gobu, where the Azerbaijani refugees of the First Nagorno-Karabakh War live. Though the local police initially appealed to the crowd to disperse, the crowd ignored them. The Rapid Police Unit (RPU) then intervened and dispersed the protestors, numbering around 700 to 800 people, in the early hours of 13 July. On 14 July, after the deaths of Major General Polad Hashimov and Colonel Ilgar Mirzayev during the border clashes with Armenia, about 30 to 50 thousand people, calling for the end of the COVID-19 pandemic-related quarantine, war against Armenia, country-wide mobilisation and the resignation of Najmeddin Sadikov, the chief of general staff of the Azerbaijani Armed Forces, demonstrated in Baku, the capital of Azerbaijan and Sumgayit, with smaller rallies in support of the military in other cities around Azerbaijan. After the initial demonstrations, a smaller group stormed the Parliament building, protesting the government's inaction, though security forces later evicted them. Subsequent clashes between the demonstrators and security forces resulted in seven police officers being injured, and several cars being damaged. The seemingly impromptu rally lasted well into the early hours of 15 July. It was the largest demonstration in Azerbaijan in years.

No opposition or government figure appeared in front of the crowd when they stormed Parliament. Analysts said there was "neither a government official nor an intellectual" who could stand up to such a crowd. Some opposition members said that they "did not appear that day because they were worried about provocation". Government officials stated the government did not address the crowd because of the "restrictive and stay-at-home measures" because of the COVID-19 pandemic. Some interpreted the Parliament break-in, and some of the earlier episodes, as provocations meant to discredit the protesters. According to Zaur Shiriyev, a Baku-based analyst for the International Crisis Group, the death of Hashimov and other high-ranking officers was a "turning point" and had "changed people's minds".

The Azerbaijani government regarded the storming of the Parliament as a "provocation", with President Ilham Aliyev blaming the Popular Front Party of Azerbaijan (PFPA), the main opposition party, for the incident, though the PPFA declared its members innocent. The Azerbaijani authorities launched a criminal case over the incident and completed their preliminary investigation over the arrests on 11 September. 36 people were arrested—16 were members of the PFPA. Despite this, according to other Azerbaijani sources, as many as 120 people were detained after the protests, including journalists. Relatives of some detainees said that they could not get information about their family members for more than a day. According to some reports, some detainees were not fed or given a place to sleep.

The protests are believed to have led to the 2020 Nagorno-Karabakh war later in the year.

== Background ==
=== Nagorno-Karabakh conflict ===
The territorial ownership of Nagorno-Karabakh is fiercely contested between Armenians and Azerbaijanis. The conflict over the region has its roots in events following World War I. Until the 2020 Nagorno-Karabakh war, the region was de jure part of Azerbaijan, although large parts were de facto held by the internationally unrecognised Republic of Artsakh supported by Armenia.

The situation in Nagorno-Karabakh after the 1994 ceasefire

During the Soviet era, an autonomous oblast within the Azerbaijan SSR governed the predominantly Armenian-populated region. As the Soviet Union began to disintegrate during the late 1980s the question of Nagorno-Karabakh's status re-emerged, and on 20 February 1988 the parliament of the Nagorno-Karabakh Autonomous Oblast passed a resolution requesting transfer of the oblast from the Azerbaijan SSR to the Armenian SSR. Azerbaijan rejected the request several times, and ethnic violence began shortly after with a series of pogroms between 1988 and 1990 against Armenians in Sumgait, Ganja and Baku, and against Azerbaijanis in Gugark and Stepanakert. Following the revocation of Nagorno-Karabakh's autonomous status, an independence referendum was held in the region on 10 December 1991. The Azerbaijani population, which then constituted around 22.8% of the region's population boycotted the referendum. 99.8% of participants voted in favour. In early 1992, following the Soviet Union's collapse, the region descended into outright war.

The First Nagorno-Karabakh War resulted in the displacement of approximately 725,000 Azerbaijanis and 300,000–500,000 Armenians from both Azerbaijan and Armenia. The 1994 Bishkek Protocol brought the fighting to an end and resulted in significant Armenian territorial gains: in addition to controlling most of Nagorno-Karabakh, the Republic of Artsakh also occupied the surrounding Azerbaijani populated districts of Agdam, Jabrayil, Fuzuli, Kalbajar, Qubadli, Lachin and Zangilan. The terms of the Bishkek agreement produced a frozen conflict, and long-standing international mediation attempts to create a peace process were initiated by the OSCE Minsk Group in 1994, with the interrupted Madrid Principles being the most recent iteration prior to 2020. The United Nations Security Council adopted four resolutions in 1993 calling for the withdrawal of "occupying forces" from the territories surrounding Nagorno-Karabakh, (Note: Resolutions 822, 853, 874 and 884: "Resolution 822 (1993)" (PDF). United Nations Security Council. 30 April 1993. Archived from the original (PDF) on 11 November 2020.; "Resolution 853 (1993)" (PDF). United Nations Security Council. 29 July 1993. Archived from the original (PDF) on 11 November 2020.; "Resolution 874 (1993)" (PDF). United Nations Security Council. 14 October 1993. Archived from the original (PDF) on 11 November 2020.; "Resolution 884 (1993)" (PDF). United Nations Security Council. 12 November 1993. Archived from the original (PDF) on 6 December 2020.) and in 2008 the General Assembly adopted a resolution demanding the immediate withdrawal of Armenian occupying forces, although the co-chairs of the OSCE Minsk Group, Russia, France and the United States, voted against it.

=== Border clashes ===
For three decades multiple violations of the ceasefire occurred, the most serious being the four-day 2016 Nagorno-Karabakh conflict. In August 2019, in a declaration in favour of unification, the Armenian prime minister Nikol Pashinyan stated "Artsakh is Armenia, full stop". From 12 to 16 July 2020, skirmishes occurred on the border between Armenia and Azerbaijan, mainly in the Tavush province of Armenia and the Tovuz district of Azerbaijan. The skirmishes were conducted mainly through artillery and drones, without infantry, and were of varying intensity, injuring many, and killing at least 17 military and one civilian. Among Azerbaijani military casualties were high-ranking officers, including Major General Polad Hashimov and Colonel Ilgar Mirzayev. Hashimov was buried alongside Mirzayev on 15 July in the Second Alley of Honor in Baku. Azerbaijan's minister of defence, Zakir Hasanov, chief of general staff, Najmaddin Sadigov, and, the mayor of Baku, Eldar Azizov, attended the funeral. On the same day, President Ilham Aliyev had a telephone conversation with Hashimov's mother, expressing his deep condolences to her. A street was named after Hashimov in his native Vandam, in Gabala District. A park named after Polad Hashimov was opened in the Osmangazi district of Bursa, Turkey on 28 October. Both Hashimov and Mirzayev were declared National Heroes of Azerbaijan in December 2020.

== Gobu protests ==
On 12 July, despite COVID-19 regulations, mass pro-war protests erupted at night in Gobu Park, near Baku, where the Azerbaijani internally displaced persons (IDPs) live. Protesters, chanting slogans such as "Martyrs do not die, the homeland will not be divided," moved towards the Bina Bazaar. The local police initially talked to the crowd and tried to disperse it, but the crowd ignored them. The protestors, numbering around 700 to 800 people, were broadcasting the events via social media, which attracted more participants. The Rapid Police Unit (RPU) intervened and dispersed the crowd an hour after the protests had begun. Police detained dozens of protestors, though they were released afterwards. The RPU was deployed in Lokbatan to ensure security.

== The Karabakh March ==
On 14 July, hundreds of people arrived in front of Colonel Ilgar Mirzayev's house in the Khatai District of Baku, where his body was due to arrive. Mirzayev was one of the high-ranking officers killed during the border skirmishes with Armenia. Shortly after, demonstrations erupted in Sumgait, where Major General Polad Hashimov was residing before his death during the border skirmishes, and Ahmadli, with hundreds of demonstrators chanting pro-army slogans. The demonstrations spread to others parts of Baku, with about 30 to 50 thousand demonstrators being present. They first marched to Freedom Square, then to the Martyrs' Lane but were not allowed enter it, or the National Assembly of Azerbaijan. The Baku Police did not allow vehicles to enter the area to ensure the crowd's safety. The demonstrators, waving the Azerbaijani flag, called for the end of the COVID-19 pandemic related quarantine, mobilisation and a war against Armenia to retake the disputed Nagorno-Karabakh region. There were smaller rallies in support of the military in other cities around Azerbaijan, usually connected to the burials of fallen soldiers.

On the same day, a video calling for mobilisation on behalf of Azerbaijan's minister of defence, Zakir Hasanov, was spread on the social media. The video shows an unidentified man sitting in a police car talking through a loudspeaker. Dozens of people, including two in police uniforms, appeared to have gathered around the car. The Azerbaijani Ministry of Internal Affairs claimed that the video was fake, though local social media users disputed this. The Azerbaijani military authorities said they were unaware of who disseminated the information. Elshad Hajiyev, a spokesman for the Baku State Traffic Police, said he was unaware of the identity of the person "sitting in a police car and calling for mobilisation". The State Service for Mobilization and Conscription of Azerbaijan, in a statement referring to the recruitment of the reservists, said there was "no reason for such a need today". The service added it had received numerous appeals from the citizens willing to serve on the frontline and provide assistance.

=== Storming of the Parliament ===
After the initial demonstrations, a smaller group reached the front of the National Assembly on the night of 14 and 15 July. Apart from support for the army and calls for war, the demonstrators demanded the resignation of the chief of general staff of the Azerbaijani Armed Forces and the deputy minister of defence, Najmeddin Sadikov, who was suspected of giving the coordinates of Polad Hashimov's location to the Armenian authorities, leading to his death. At around 01:00, street lights were turned off in front of the Parliament building. However, the demonstrators protested this by turning their phone lights and whistling. Although a representative from the Azerbaijani Ministry of Defence arrived to address the crowd, the demonstrators did not allow him to speak and demanded that the president of Azerbaijan, Ilham Aliyev, come and speak. At around 04:00, riots broke out, during which police cars were overturned. Several demonstrators breached the National Assembly, protesting the government's inaction. They smashed windows and chandeliers inside, but security forces later evicted them. A BBC Azerbaijani Service correspondent at the scene reported that although there were guards inside, they did not interfere with the crowd. According to a report by the Azerbaijani Parliament, the demonstrators damaged a number of items in the Parliament worth 22,150 AZN in total. The Azerbaijani Ministry of Internal Affairs accused the demonstrators of deliberately disobeying the demands of police officers and attacking them with stones and other objects. As a result, seven police officers were injured, two service cars of the State Traffic Police Department were overturned and rendered useless, fourteen more service cars and the road infrastructure in the area were seriously damaged. After that, security forces used water cannons, tear gas and batons to disperse those gathered in front of the Parliament building. Other demonstrators tried to convince police to join them. The demonstrators moved towards Martyrs' Lane and continued protesting there. They began to disperse in the early morning near Baku Boulevard and Freedom Square. According to Turan, an independent Azerbaijani news agency, several hundred protesters then marched, escorted by police, to the Nariman Narimanov Monument and the building of the Azerbaijani Ministry of Taxes, before dispersing.

== Aftermath ==
=== Domestic response ===
On 15 July, no opposition or government figure appeared in front of the crowd. Analysts said there was "neither a government official nor an intellectual" who could stand up to such a crowd. Some opposition members said they "did not appear that day because they were worried about provocation". Government officials said the government did not address the crowd because of the "restrictive and stay-at-home measures" for the COVID-19 pandemic. Political analyst Rashad Shirin attributed the government's reluctance to appear in public to the "fact that they were not used to speaking ... and were not prepared for such a tense situation". He also said the president's speech in a spontaneous, chaotic rally could be problematic because there were security issues. Isa Gambar, head of the National Centre for Strategic Thought, said the government had "no influential people to bring" before the crowd. According to him, the Azerbaijani government had subjugated the intellectuals, and "forced them to lose prestige, or completely excluded them from the socio-political process". Khadija Ismayilova, a human rights activist and investigative journalist, said that although the expectations of the crowd in front of the Parliament were a "promise of mobilisation", there was "no government in Azerbaijan that could make that promise". Recalling the 2013 Baku protests, Ismayilova speculated that the government will "once again take steps to get rid of unpopular people". Zahid Oruj, an Azerbaijani MP and head of the Centre for Social Research, believed that it was wrong to approach the issue through the prism of government officials failing to appear before the crowd. Some interpreted the Parliament break-in, and some other earlier episodes, as provocations meant to discredit the protesters.

=== Government response ===
The Azerbaijani government regarded the storming of the Parliament as a provocation, calling the protestors a "group of provocateurs". On 15 July, the Prosecutor General's Office and the Ministry of Internal Affairs of Azerbaijan announced they had launched a criminal case against a group of individuals during a rally in support of the army in Baku and that investigative measures were being taken. On the same day, a statement issued on behalf of the Azerbaijani Parliament condemned the actions of "some provocateurs aimed at destruction and damage". In a screed delivered on the same day, the president of Azerbaijan, Ilham Aliyev, blamed the Popular Front Party of Azerbaijan (PFPA), the country's main opposition party, and the National Council of Democratic Forces (NCDF), an alliance of Azerbaijan's opposition parties, for the storming of the Parliament building. He declared the need to "finish with the 'fifth column', calling them "worse than the Armenians". In response, the PFPA and NCDF stated they had not organised the rally and declared their members innocent. The PFPA released a statement saying it had declared its support for the Azerbaijani Armed Forces since the beginning of the skirmishes and called Aliyev's speech "a disgrace to the state" adding that it was "an announcement of the beginning of the next wave of repressions".

The preliminary investigation over the arrests was completed on 11 September. 37 people were prosecuted, officially charged with intentionally causing minor bodily harm, intentionally destroying or damaging another's property, violating public order, and resisting or using force against a government official. Among them, 36 were arrested, and one was put under house arrest. 16 of those prosecuted were members of the PFPA. Others prosecuted included members of the Azerbaijan Democracy and Welfare Movement (ADR) and the Muslim Union Movement. Despite this, according to other Azerbaijani sources, as many as 120 people were detained after the protests, including members of the NIDA Civic Movement and journalists. Relatives of some detainees said they could not obtain information about them for more than a day. According to some reports, a number of detainees were not fed or given a place to sleep.

In response to the demonstrators' calls for mobilisation, President Aliyev said that only 150 people had signed up to go to the frontline. This statement caused anger and frustration in the Azerbaijani public. Azerbaijani activist Bakhtiyar Hajiyev said that the president's statement was humiliating for the people who flooded the streets. According to him, the message that the Azerbaijani public expected from the state and the president was completely different—a positive reaction. Azerbaijani MP Zahid Oruj said those who "draw conclusions from the president's speech as disappointing distort the real purpose of the head of state". He stressed the president's speech had "increased the morale of the society and strengthened their confidence in victory". Oruj said that interpreting the president's speech as "Azerbaijan does not want to fight" meant distorting Aliyev's true purpose. He added that "against the background of people who sometimes sound like fighting, great ideals of young people, forces trying to gain points by exploiting the feelings of the homeland, not all applicants intended to go to the trenches".

The protests are believed to have led to the 2020 Nagorno-Karabakh war later in September of the same year.

== International reactions ==
On 20 July 2020, the United States Department of State urged the Azerbaijani government to avoid using the COVID-19 pandemic to "silence civil society advocacy, opposition voices, or public discussion". On 13 August, the Amnesty International also urged to end the "violent persecution of opposition activists". These actions were widely seen as an attempt to "eliminate pro-democracy advocates and political rivals once and for all".
