= Madad Chobanov =

Azerbaijani academic (1937–2023)

Madad Chobanov Mədəd Çobanov
- Born: April 11, 1937; Bolnisi Municipality, Georgian SSR, USSR
- Died: June 2, 2023 (aged 86); Baku, Azerbaijan
- Education: A.S. Pushkin Tbilisi State Pedagogical Institute
- Scientific career
- Fields: philology
- Workplaces: Tbilisi State University; Azerbaijan Higher Military Academy; Azerbaijan Higher Naval Academy

Madad Namaz oghlu Chobanov (Azerbaijani: Mədəd Namaz oğlu Çobanov, April 11, 1937 — June 2, 2023) was an Azerbaijani turkologist and toponymist, academician of the New York Academy of Sciences, member of the Turkish Language Association, Doctor of Philological Sciences, professor, Presidential scholarship holder.

== Biography ==
Madad Chobanov was born on April 11, 1937, in Bolnisi Municipality, Georgian SSR. He graduated from the Tbilisi State Pedagogical Institute and worked as a teacher, docent and professor at that institute until 1994. In 1973, he defended his candidacy, and in 1992, his doctoral theses. He was elected a professor in 1993. Since 1994, he has continued his scientific and pedagogical activities in Baku. He worked as a dean at the Azerbaijan Institute of Higher Education and Retraining of Senior Pedagogical Personnel, and as a rector at the Elite University of Azerbaijan.

For many years, he was the head of the language department of the Azerbaijan Higher Military Academy and the Azerbaijan Higher Naval Academy, and a member of the Expert Council of the Higher Attestation Commission under the President of the Republic of Azerbaijan.

He was elected a full member of the New York Academy of Sciences and a member of the Turkish Language Association.

In different years, he gave lectures at Azerbaijan State Pedagogical University and Azerbaijan Technical University. He is the author of more than 60 scientific books. He gave reports at international congresses, scientific-theoretical conferences, symposia, and scientific-practical seminars held in Azerbaijan, Turkey, Russia, Georgia and Central Asian countries. Dozens of scientific articles and books have been published in those countries.

Madad Chobanov died on June 2, 2023, in Baku.
