= Novruzlu =

Novruzlu or Nuruzly may refer to:

- Novruzlu, Agdam, Azerbaijan
- Novruzlu, Saatly, Azerbaijan
