= Najmeddin Sadikov =

Azerbaijani general

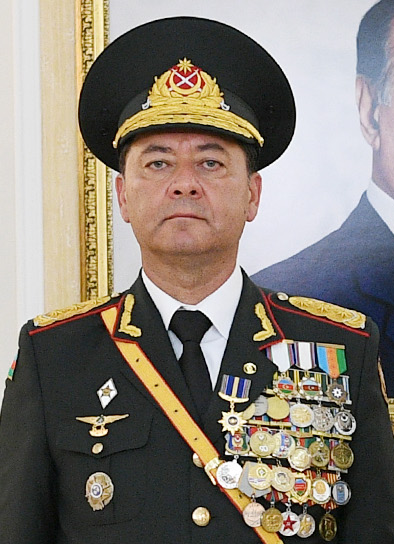

Chief of the General Staff of the Azerbaijani Armed Forces
- In office 2 November 1993 – 28 January 2021
- President: Heydar Aliyev; Ilham Aliyev
- Preceded by: Nuraddin Sadigov; Safar Abiyev (acting)
- Succeeded by: Karim Valiyev

Personal details
- Born: 24 May 1956 (age 70) Derbent, Dagestan, Russian SFSR, Soviet Union

Military service
- Branch/service: Soviet Army; Azerbaijani Armed Forces
- Years of service: 1975–2021
- Rank: Colonel General
- Battles/wars: First Nagorno-Karabakh War; Second Nagorno-Karabakh War

Najmeddin Huseyn oghlu Sadikov (Azerbaijani: Nəcməddin Hüseyn oğlu Sadıkov; born 24 May 1956) is an Azerbaijani Colonel General who served as the Chief of the General Staff of Azerbaijani Armed Forces and the First Deputy Minister of Defense of Azerbaijan. He was appointed to both positions on 2 November 1993 by President of Azerbaijan Heydar Aliyev. On 28 January 2021 it was announced that he is no longer serving as the chief of staff, and Karim Valiyev took his position on 23 July of that year.

== Early life ==
Sadikov was born in the city of Derbent to an ethnic Azerbaijani family. He had a brother who died in the 1980s. After 1991, he moved to Azerbaijan with his family. He is married and has three children Sadikov's nephew, Ramil Asgarov, is another senior military official, who has been major general until June 2020.

== Soviet Armed Forces ==
Sadikov joined the Soviet Armed Forces in 1975. He graduated from the Baku Higher Combined Arms Command School in 1979 and earned the gold medal. He served as a platoon commander, a company commander, a battalion commander and regiment deputy commander in the Soviet Army from 1979 to 1992. He graduated from the Frunze Military Academy in Moscow in 1988, and in 1991 completed the Senior Officer Courses "Vystrel" ("Shot") named after Marshal of the Soviet Union Boris Shaposhnikov.

== Azerbaijani Armed Forces ==
Sadikov joined the newly formed Azerbaijani Army on 1 February 1992. After its creation, he became the first commander of the 1st Army Corps. He led the corps during the failed Battle of Kalbajar. On 2 November 1993, he was appointed as Chief of the General Staff. Up until his dismissal, he was the longest serving chief of defence in the Commonwealth of Independent States. Sadikov was a member of the Commission on National Security Policies which prepares and develops documents on national security concepts, foreign policy strategies and military doctrines of Azerbaijan. By the presidential decree No. 858 from 24 June 2005 he was promoted to the rank of Colonel General.

=== Criticism ===
Sadikov's critics allege that he, despite being ethnically Azerbaijani, does not speak Azerbaijani language because he was born in Dagestan, and therefore all documents on his desk are first translated from Azerbaijani into Russian by special services. In early October 2020, Azerbaijani press circles spread rumors on the arrest of Sadikov, who was accused of treason. Investigators claimed that he was recruited by the Russian special services through a nephew in Russia. Later, this information was refuted, and the media reported that Sadikov was sidelined at the beginning of the 2020 Nagorno-Karabakh war due to his dissatisfaction with the widespread presence of the Turkish Armed Forces in the administrative level of the Azerbaijani military.

He has also been accused of having a good relationship with Armenian officials, with many pointing to a photo of Sadikov and Armenian general Mikael Harutyunyan laughing at the meeting of NATO Military Committee for European-Atlantic partnerships in 2006 as a reason to be distrustful of Sadikov.

=== Protests against Sadikov ===
During the July 2020 Azerbaijani protests, the protesters chanted slogans "Najmaddin resign". The demonstrators demanded his resignation due to him being suspected of acting as a sleeper agent for the Armenian Army, in which he allegedly leaked the coordinates of General Polad Hashimov during skirmishes that month. Sadikov served as a pallbearer at his funeral.

== Dismissal and missing ==
During the Second Nagorno-Karabakh War Sadikov disappeared and has not been seen since. Agil Abbas, deputy of the National Assembly of Azerbaijan, believed that Sadikov was placed under house arrest. Official information has not been published. Fuad Shahbaz, a Baku-based political and military analyst, said that "the state wants a quiet solution to this and for people to forget about it".

On 28 January 2021, the Azerbaijani Defense Ministry confirmed the dismissal of Sadikov, saying that he no longer serves in the Azerbaijani army. It was earlier reported that he had serious health problems and underwent open-heart surgery in Moscow. Later, his name was removed from the official website of the ministry.

== Awards ==
Sadikov has received multiple awards, among them:

- Medal for the Motherland (2003)
- Order for the Service to the Motherland 3rd degree (2007)
- Medal for the Military Service (2009)
- Azerbaijani Army 100th Anniversary Medal (2018)

== See also ==
- Azerbaijani Army
- Ministers of Defense of Azerbaijan Republic
- Safar Abiyev
