= Military Academy of the Azerbaijani Armed Forces =

War College of the Azerbaijani Armed Forces
- Azərbaycan Silahlı Qüvvələrinin Hərbi Akademiyası
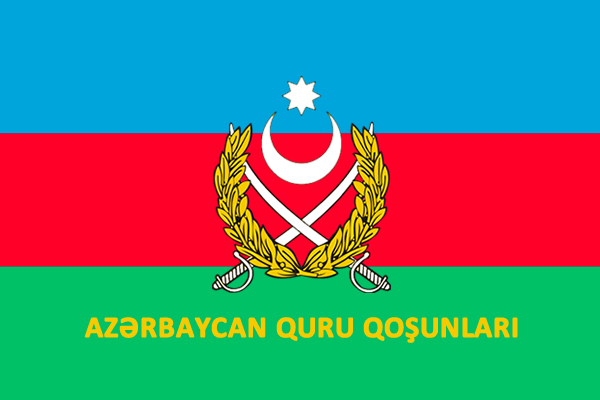
- Flag of the armed forces
- Type: Military Academy; War college
- Established: 1999
- Affiliations: AAFWC
- Rector: Heydar Piriyev
- Location: Baku, Azerbaijan

The Military Academy of the Azerbaijani Armed Forces (Azerbaijani: Azərbaycan Silahlı Qüvvələrinin Hərbi Akademiyası) translated into English as the War College of the Azerbaijani Armed Forces is an academic institution of the Azerbaijani Armed Forces. It is seniormost military academy of its kind in the military of Azerbaijan, training senior military officers and personnel to develop their military professions and their leadership skills. The War College was established by decree of President Heydar Aliyev on February 20, 1999, in order to provide an effective training courses for post-secondary military education. Students at the War College receive a two-year education which focuses on command positions and tactical or operational levels. Lieutenant General Heydar Piriyev is one of the more recent and notable graduates of the war college and the current rector of the college.

== Courses ==
- Military diplomacy
- Military economics
- Military politics
- Foreign languages
  - English
  - German
  - French
  - Persian
  - Armenian
  - Russian

== Chiefs ==
- Major General Najaf Gambarov (-18 November 2013)
- Major General Altay Mehdiyev (18 November 2013-June 2014)
- Lieutenant General Heydar Piriyev (since June 2014)

== Alumni ==
- Lieutenant General Karim Valiyev (class of 2006), Chief of Main Department for Personnel
- Colonel Ilgar Mirzayev (class of 1995), an artillery chief serving in the 3rd Army Corps until his death during the July 2020 Armenian–Azerbaijani clashes.

== See also ==
- Vazgen Sargsyan Military University
- National Defense Academy (Georgia)
- List of universities in Azerbaijan
