= Ilgar Mirzayev =

Azerbaijani military officer (1973–2020)

- Born: May 8, 1973; Gardabani, Georgian SSR, Soviet Union
- Died: July 14, 2020 (aged 47) Tovuz District, Azerbaijan
- Buried: Baku
- Allegiance: Azerbaijani Armed Forces (1995–2020)
- Branch: Azerbaijani Land Forces (1995–2020)
- Service years: 1995–2020
- Rank: Colonel
- Commands: 3rd Army Corps (chief of artillery)
- Conflicts: 2016 Nagorno-Karabakh conflict; July 2020 Armenian–Azerbaijani clashes
- Education: Azerbaijan Higher Military Academy; War College of the Azerbaijani Armed Forces

Ilgar Anzor oghlu Mirzayev (Azerbaijani: İlqar Anzor oğlu Mirzəyev; 8 May 1973 – 2020) was an Azerbaijani military officer, National Hero of Azerbaijan, and colonel serving in the Azerbaijani Armed Forces until his death during the July 2020 Armenian–Azerbaijani clashes. He also had participated in the April 2016 clashes.

== Early years ==
Ilgar Anzor oglu Mirzayev was born on 8 May 1973, in Gardabani, Georgian SSR, then the Soviet Union. He entered the secondary school of Gardabani in 1980 and graduated in 1990. Mirzayev was admitted to the Azerbaijan Higher Military Academy in 1991 and graduated in 1995.

== Military service ==
In 1995, Ilgar Mirzayev began his service with the rank of lieutenant. From 2003 to 2005, he improved his education at the War College of the Azerbaijani Armed Forces. Mirzayev had served in Baku, Ganja, Nakhchivan, Beylagan, Goranboy, and Shamkir in different years. He served on the frontline during the April 2016 clashes. On 23 February 2019, he was appointed Chief of Artillery of the 3rd Army Corps.

Mirzayev took part in the clashes on the Armenian–Azerbaijani border in July 2020. He was killed on 14 July 2020, in the territory of Tovuz District. Mirzayev was buried on July 15 in the Second Alley of Honor in Baku, alongside Polad Hashimov. Azerbaijan's minister of defense, Zakir Hasanov, chief of general staff, Najmaddin Sadigov, and, the Mayor of Baku, Eldar Azizov, also attended the funeral.

== Personal life ==
Ilgar Mirzayev was married. He had 1 son and 1 daughter. President of Azerbaijan, Ilham Aliyev, gave an apartment to Mirzayev's family on 17 July.

== Awards ==
- Mirzayev was awarded the 2nd and 3rd-degree For service to the Fatherland Orders in 2016.
- Mirzayev was awarded the Azerbaijani Army 100th anniversary medal in 2018.
- Mirzayev was promoted to the rank of colonel in 2018.
- Mirzayev was awarded the title of National Hero of Azerbaijan on 9 December 2020.
