= Paghaghbyur =

Paghaghbyur Պաղաղբյուր
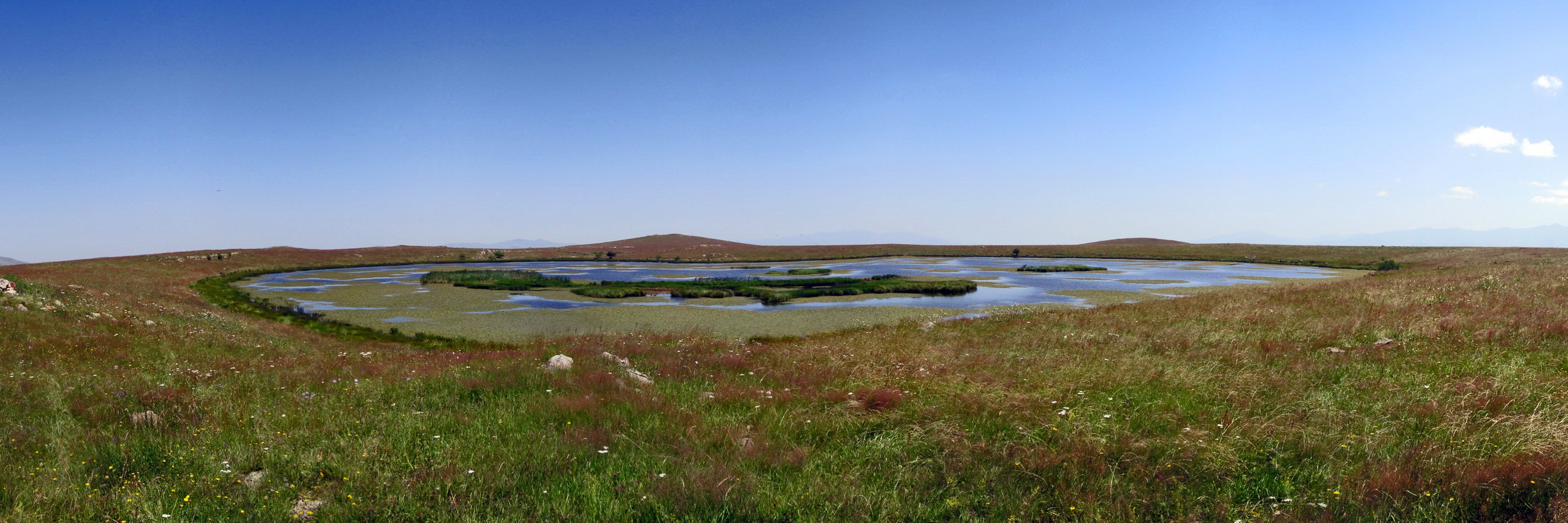

- Location within Armenia
- Coordinates: 41°10′45″N 44°07′08″E
- Country: Armenia
- Province: Lori
- Elevation: 1,750 m (5,740 ft)

Population (2011)
  - Total: 113
- Time zone: UTC+4 (AMT)

Paghaghbyur (Armenian: Պաղաղբյուր; Azerbaijani: Soyuqbulaq) is a village in the Lori Province of Armenia.

== History ==
The village was populated by Azerbaijanis before the exodus of Azerbaijanis from Armenia after the outbreak of the Nagorno-Karabakh conflict. In 1988-1989 Armenian refugees from Azerbaijan settled in the village.
