= Karim Valiyev =

Azerbaijani military officer (born 1961)

- Kərim Vəliyev
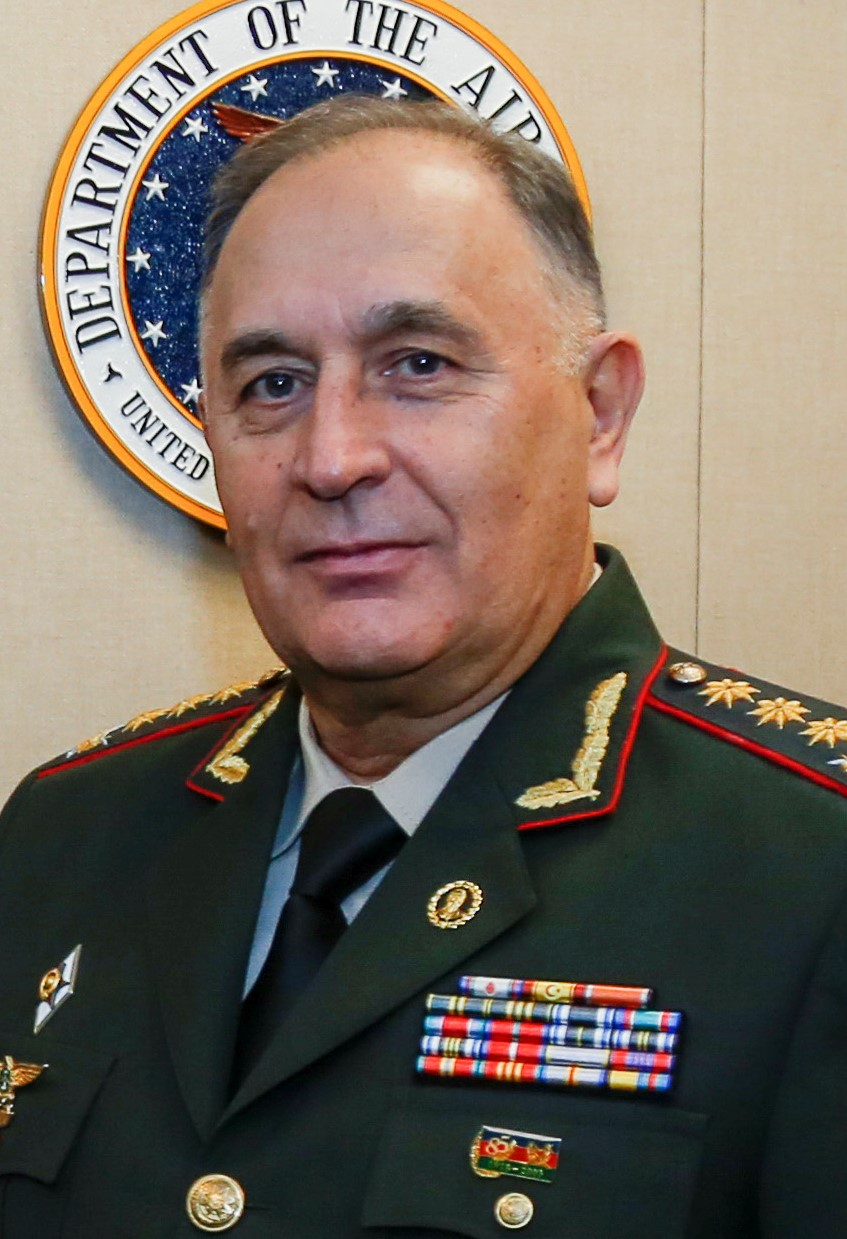

Chief of the General Staff
- Incumbent
- Assumed office 23 July 2021
- President: Ilham Aliyev
- Preceded by: Najmeddin Sadikov

Personal details
- Born: 9 February 1961 (age 65) Baku, Azerbaijani SSR, Soviet Union
- Awards: Zafar Order; Azerbaijani Flag Order; For service to the Fatherland Order

Military service
- Allegiance: Azerbaijan
- Branch/service: Azerbaijani Land Forces
- Rank: Colonel General
- Battles/wars: Second Nagorno-Karabakh War

Karim Tofig oghlu Valiyev (Azerbaijani: Kərim Tofiq oğlu Vəliyev; born 9 February 1961) is an Azerbaijani military officer, serving as the colonel general in the Azerbaijani Armed Forces. He is the Chief of the General Staff of Azerbaijani Armed Forces and the First Deputy Minister of Defence of Azerbaijan. He had served as the head of the Main Department for Personnel of the Ministry of Defence of Azerbaijan on 23 July 2021. Valiyev had taken part in the Second Nagorno-Karabakh War.

== Early life ==
Karim Tofig oghlu Valiyev was born on 9 February 1961, in Baku, the capital of the Azerbaijani SSR, which was then part of the Soviet Union. In 1982, he graduated with honours from the Baku Higher Combined Arms Command School. Valiyev served in the Soviet Armed Forces as a cadet platoon commander, assistant head of the training department, and the senior assistant to the head of the training department from 1982 to 1990. From 1990 to 1994, he studied at the Frunze Military Academy in Moscow.

== Military service ==
Since 1992, Karim Valiyev has been serving in the Azerbaijani Armed Forces. During the years of service, he held the positions of the deputy head of the training department, the deputy brigade commander, the brigade commander, the deputy front commander, the deputy minister of defence for combat operations, the commander of a military formation, the head of the Military Scientific Center, and the head of the Defence Planning Military Strategy.

Karim Valiyev took part in the Second Nagorno-Karabakh War. Then, on 10 December, Valiyev led the victory parade in Baku held in the occasion of Azerbaijan's victory in the war. On 23 July 2021, Karim Valiyev was appointed as Chief of General Staff of Azerbaijani Armed Forces.

== Personal life ==
Karim Valiyev is married and has two children.

== Awards ==
- Valiyev was awarded the Azerbaijani Flag Order in 1994, by the order of the then President of Azerbaijan, Heydar Aliyev.
- Valiyev was awarded the For the Motherland Medal in 2005, by the order of the President of Azerbaijan, Ilham Aliyev.
- Valiyev was awarded the For Military Merit Medal in 2012, by the order of the President Aliyev.
- Valiyev was awarded the Zafar Order in 2020, by the order of the President Aliyev.
