= Qobu =

- Municipality
- Gobu Park-3 Residential Complex.

- Location within Azerbaijan
- Coordinates: 40°24′17″N 49°42′47″E
- Country: Azerbaijan
- District: Absheron

Population (2008)
  - Total: 7,997
- Time zone: UTC+4 (AZT)
  - Summer (DST): UTC+5 (AZT)

Qobu (Gobu) is a district and municipality in the Absheron District of Azerbaijan. Situated approximately 20 kilometers northwest of the capital city, Baku, Qobu has seen significant growth in recent years and now boasts a population exceeding 15,000 residents. The village is notable for its proximity to industrial and energy infrastructure, given its location within Azerbaijan's oil-rich region.

== History ==
Qobu has a rich history linked to Azerbaijan's broader historical and cultural development. The area has long been inhabited, with historical records indicating agricultural and pastoral activities as central to village life. In recent decades, the expansion of Baku and the development of regional infrastructure have contributed to Qobu's growth.

Qobu is one of the ancient villages of the Absheron region in Azerbaijan, though its history remains relatively under-researched. Historian Sara Ashurbeyli stated that Qobu was established approximately 700 years ago. The name "Qobu" means "temporary water flow path, or plain." The village is surrounded by the Shubani Mountains.

In the 1740s, when the Baki Xanligi was formed on the Absheron Peninsula, Qobu was one of the 39 villages included in the Xanlig. From 1747 to 1806, Qobu was part of the Baku Xanligi, and between 1806 and 1920, it was within the Baku Qezasi of the Baku Governorate.

In 1870, the Caucasian Statistical Committee published a report in Tbilisi, listing Qobu as the 42nd settlement in the Baku Qezasi. The village was noted as being 15 versts (about 16 kilometers) from Baku, with 183 households and a population of 974. Qobu had one mosque, and the residents practiced Shia Islam. Among the district's 41 villages, it ranked 12th in household numbers.

In 1892, the Russian Ministry of Internal Affairs published a statistical report noting that Qobu had 256 homes and a population of 1,511. The village had significant land for cultivation, covering around 4,960 hectares, making it one of the largest land-owning villages in the area after Novkhani, Keshla, and Gala.

On April 8, 1929, administrative districts in Azerbaijan were reorganized, and Qobu was included in the Baku District. By a decree on August 30, 1930, Azerbaijan was divided into 63 districts, and Qobu became part of the Molotov District of Baku, later gaining the status of an urban-type settlement in 1937. From July 26, 1957, it remained in Baku's Molotov District until it was renamed Garadagh District. On March 15, 1963, Garadagh District was renamed Azizbeyov District, and on June 22, 1964, Qobu was incorporated into the newly independent Absheron District.

== Other ==
Near the Qobu cemetery, there is a healing water source known as "Pil-pilə." The village is also home to the shrine "Qırx Qızlar" ("Forty Girls"), where the rocks are arranged in a way that resembles forty people standing in line. On Fridays, locals claim to hear the sounds of women wailing from these rocks. Along the Qobu-Lökbatan road lies a location called "Səfər Körpüsü" (Səfər's Bridge), named after a local resident who built a bridge to control floodwaters.

Several Azerbaijani films, including Bakıda Küləklər Əsir ("The Winds Blow in Baku"), Mən Vulkana Doğru Gedirəm ("I Am Heading Towards the Volcano"), and Mehman ("The Guest"), were filmed in Qobu.

The village has an ancient cemetery, from which some gravestones are preserved in the Old City (Icherisheher) caravanserai in Baku. The inscriptions on these stones are in a form of calligraphy known as "Shikaste."

The "Qobu carpet" is a well-known traditional craft of the village, recognized for its unique patterns and weaving techniques. The carpets are woven with camel wool, dyed using natural plants, and were historically even exported abroad. The tradition of carpet weaving continues in Qobu, where villagers are distinct from other settlements in Absheron, especially in their unique dialect.

Today, Qobu also hosts Azerbaijan's largest camel-breeding farm, and many residents work in the oil industry of Garadagh District. A monument honors over 400 residents who served in World War II, of whom only five returned alive. Additionally, 170 residents of Qobu participated in the Karabakh War, with seven casualties and six left disabled.

== Geographical Location ==
This village is situated in a large depression slightly above sea level. It is surrounded on all sides by the Shubani Mountains. Qobu is located 11 kilometers from the "Avtovagzal" station of the Baku Metro and neighbors the settlements of Lokbatan, Guzdek, Hokmali, and Atyali.
