= Şehitler ölmez vatan bölünmez! =

Qusar Martyrs' Memorial featuring the phrase

Şehitler ölmez vatan bölünmez! (English: Martyrs do not die, the homeland can't be divided) is a Turkish language nationalist slogan, usually chanted in support of the Turkish military.

The slogan is invoked frequently at sports events; in February 2018 Galatasaray Soccer Club fans chanted the slogans during a ceremony honoring Turkish soldiers who died during the Turkish military operation in Afrin.
