= Vəndam =

Vandam
- Municipality
- Location within Azerbaijan Location within Shaki-Zagatala Economic Region
- Coordinates: 40°56′41″N 47°56′28″E
- Country: Azerbaijan
- Rayon: Gabala

Population
  - Total: 9,507
- Time zone: UTC+4 (AZT)
  - Summer (DST): UTC+5 (AZT)
- Climate: Cfa

Vandam (also, Vendam), Vəndam in Azerbaijani, is a town and the most populous municipality, except for the capital Gabala, in the Gabala Rayon of Azerbaijan. It has a population of 9,507.

The name is linguistically unrelated to the Dutch toponymic surname Van Dam ("of the dam") which in some cases - especially when used by English-speaking people - is also written "Vandam".

== Picture gallery ==
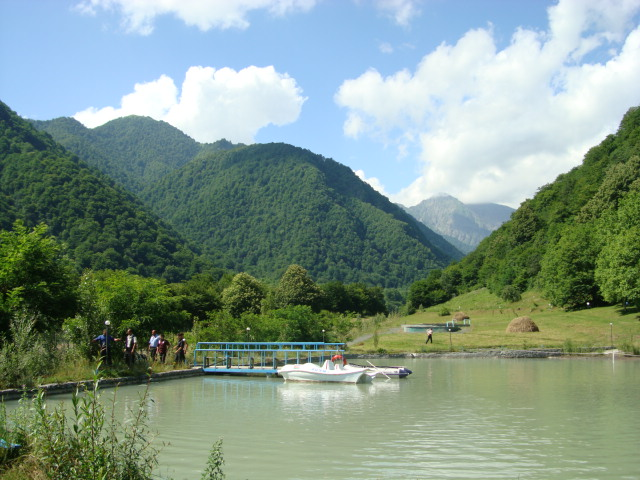
A lake by Vandam

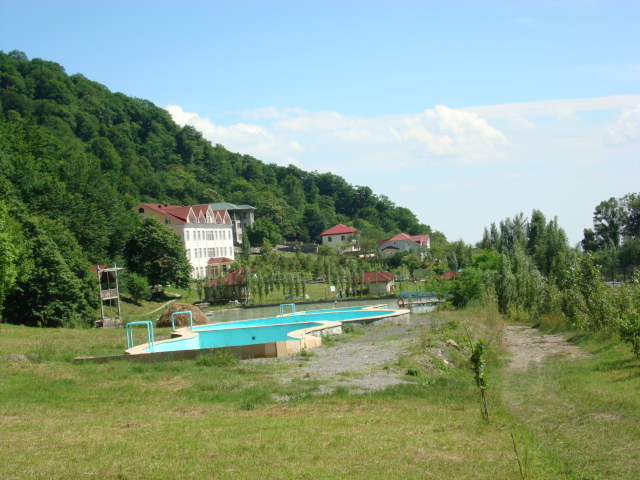
Recreational facilities

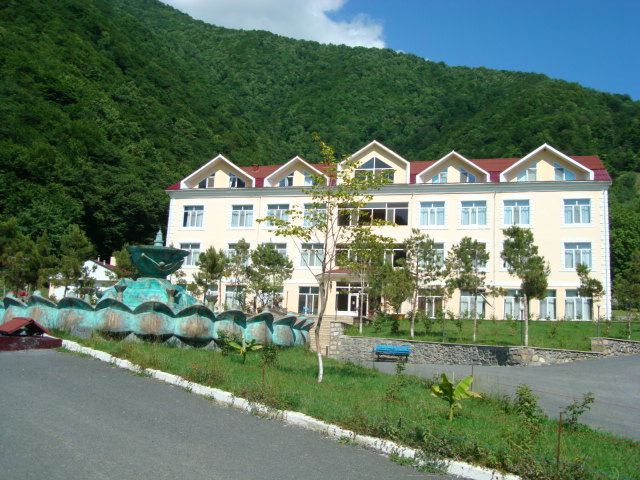
Hotel in Vandam
