= Novruzlu, Agdam =

Novruzlu
- Location within Azerbaijan Location within Karabakh Economic Region
- Coordinates: 39°57′45″N 47°01′18″E
- Country: Azerbaijan
- District: Aghdam
- Time zone: UTC+4 (AZT)
  - Summer (DST): UTC+5 (AZT)

Novruzlu is in the Aghdam District of Azerbaijan.
