= Baku Higher Combined Arms Command School =

Baku Higher Combined-Arms Command School
- Бакинское высшее общевойсковое командное училище
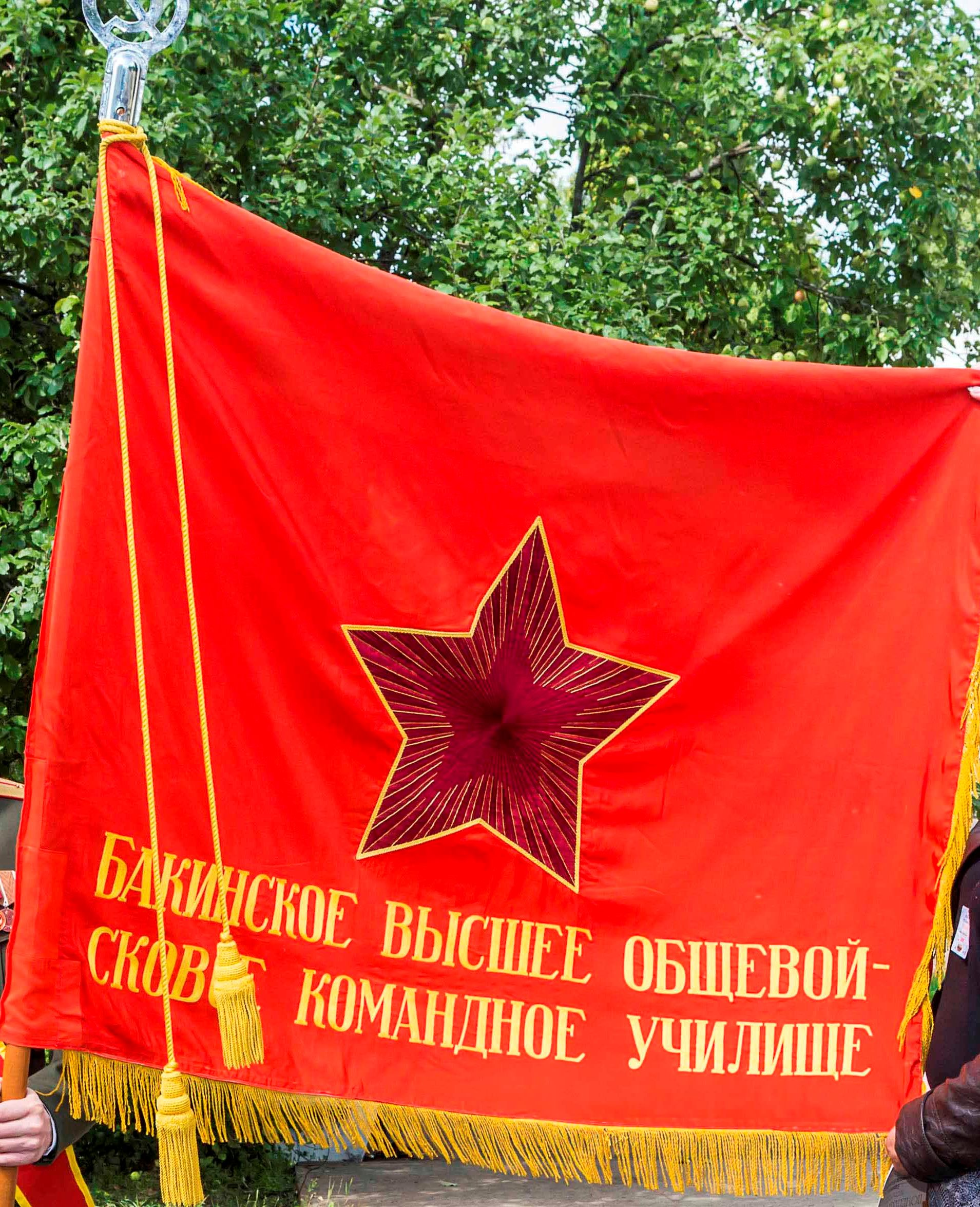
- The banner of the academy
- Type: military academy
- Active: 1939–1991
- Location: Baku, USSR
- Language: Russian

The Baku Higher Combined Arms Command School (BVOKU) was one of the military academies of the USSR. It trained military personnel in a number of specializations. It was located in Baku in the Azerbaijan SSR.

== History ==
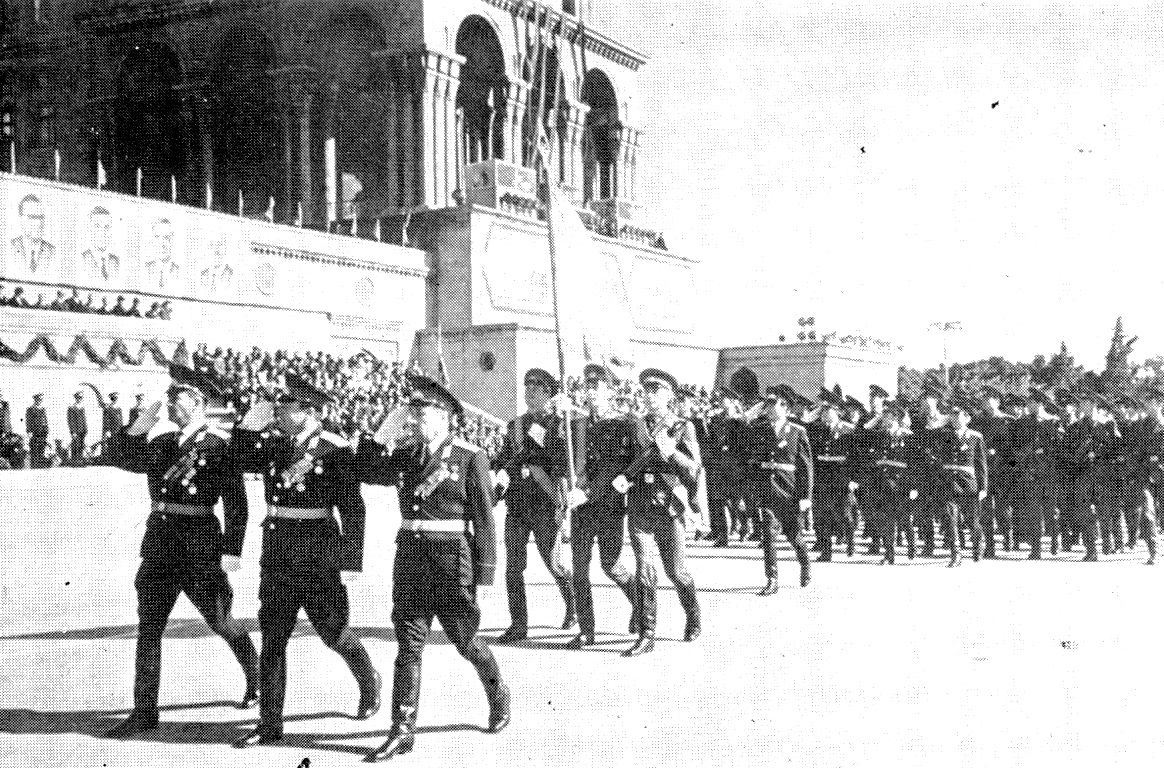
During a parade in Baku in 1970

On November 29, 1939, the school was founded by order of the People's Commissariat of Defense of the Soviet Union, Marshal Kliment Voroshilov. Colonel Vasily Sytnikov was appointed the first head of the school. In 1950, a two-year training period was introduced. In 1951, the school ranked 6th place among the infantry schools in the country. On November 28, 1966, by order of the Supreme Soviet, the school was given the honorific of the Supreme Soviet of the Azerbaijan SSR. In the 1980s, during the period of hostilities of the limited contingent of Soviet troops in Afghanistan, mountain and airborne training of cadets was introduced in the BVOKU. In 1987, the Ministry of Defense suggested that the school be closed and its cadets be sent to other parts of the country, which resulted in cadets rioting throughout its premises, which only stopped after Azerbaijani Politburo member Heydar Aliyev intervened. In 1991, the school was formally disbanded as a result of the collapse of the Soviet government and the following year, was replaced by the Azerbaijan Higher Military Academy. The cadets of the 1988, 1989, and 1990 school years were sent for graduation to other general military schools of the Russian Federation.

== Honors ==
=== Parades ===
It has a history of participating in military parades in Azerbaijan. Its last International Workers' Day Parade was in 1960. In 1965, the school, alongside the Tbilisi Higher Artillery Command School, opened a parade in Tbilisi (the capital of the Georgian SSR) in honor of the 20th anniversary of the end of the Second World War. During the 1967 October Revolution Day Parade on Lenin Square, the school was represented by the guard of honor of its 4th Cadet Battalion. In October 1970, the school, opened a military parade of the Baku Garrison in honor of the golden jubilee (50th anniversary) of Soviet Azerbaijan. All participants in the parade from the school received personal thanks from the Minister of Defense of the USSR Marshal of the Soviet Union Andrei Grechko, who the next day visited the location of the BVOKU.

=== Awards ===
In 1978, the BVOKU was awarded the Diploma of the Minister of Defense and was recognized as one of the best according to the results of the All-Army review contest dedicated to the diamond jubilee of the Great October Socialist Revolution. In 1980, the school was awarded the Memorial Red Banner of the Central Committee of the Communist Party of Azerbaijan following the results of a socialist competition in honor of the 110th anniversary of the birth of Vladimir Lenin.

== Student life ==
=== 4th Battalion Honor Guard ===
The 4th cadet battalion maintained a special honour guard unit that served as the official ceremonial ambassador of the military forces of the republic. It participated in the march on of the school battle banner, the welcoming of the Soviet leadership (the General Secretary, the head of state and head of government) and foreign delegations to Baku, as well public events such as wreath laying ceremonies. In the late 60s, the only ceremonial units in Baku were an army and navy guard, a motorcycle detachment, and a military band. The uniform of the unit was based on that of the 154th Preobrazhensky Independent Commandant's Regiment in Moscow. Its first commander was Major S. Akopdzhanyan. It had participated in the welcoming ceremonies of the leaders of Turkey, Iran, Senegal (Prime Minister Mamadou Dia) and Egypt at Binah Airport (now Heydar Aliyev International Airport). It also took part in the visit of Leonid Brezhnev to Baku in 1982 and ruby jubilee celebrations of Victory Day in 1985. In 1965, the unit had the honor to represent the academy by opening a military parade for the first time.

=== BVOKU Band ===
The band of the school (Russian: Оркестр БВОКУ) consisted in the early 60s of 25 musicians, which was around the national average at the time for Russian military bands. Most of the band were active duty servicemen, with around two-fifths being students. Many were also members of the headquarters bands of the 4th Army and the Baku Air Defense District. The band was responsible for accompanying cadets with music at events such as morning assemblies, parades and pass outs of cadets. It also often participated in the review of bands in the Transcaucasian Military District in Tbilisi. The band dormitory and studio was located at the BUO (Training Support Battalion).

== Rectors ==
The following have led the BVOKU since 1939:

- Colonel Vasily Sytnikov (29 November 1939 – 12 July 1942)
- Colonel G. Shelkov-Yezov (13 July-30 August 1942)
- Lieutenant Colonel Timofey Bilyuga (30 August–October 1942)
- Major General Vladimir Molchanov (October 1942 – 1947)
- Major General Yuri Smirnov (1947–1950)
- Major General Georgy Preobrazhensky (1950–1953)
- Major General Leonid Gredinarenko (1953–1956)
- Major General Hajibaba Zeynalov (1957–1960)
- Major General Vasily Fedotov (1960–1965)
- Major General Konstantin Sevastyanov (1965–1970)
- Major General Fedor Alexandrov (1970–1977)
- Lieutenant General Valeh Barshadly (1977–1987)
- Major General Alexander Lobanov (1987–1990)
- Major General Victor Koshevoy (1990–1991)

== Notable alumni ==
- Safar Abiyev - former Defense Minister of Azerbaijan
- Seyran Ohanyan - former Defense Minister of Armenia
- Ziya Bunyadov - Azerbaijani historian
- Zakir Hasanov - Minister of Defense of Azerbaijan
- Stanislav Zas - State Secretary of the Security Council of Belarus
- Polad Hashimov - Azerbaijani major general
- Arkady Ter-Tadevosyan - Armenian military leader during the First Nagorno-Karabakh War
- Elchin Guliyev - Chief of State Border Service of Azerbaijan

== Alumni and historical organizations ==
A public organization of veterans called Commonwealth of BVOKU graduates is currently active and hosts meetings of alumni, commanders, teachers and family members, usually held on the anniversaries of the school. A museum of the history of the school is located on the premises of the Azerbaijan Higher Military School. A virtual museum of the BVOKU is on a website dedicated to the 4th Cadet Battalion.

== Gallery ==
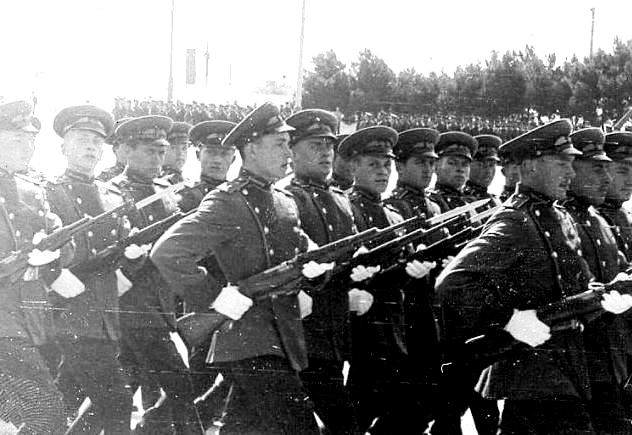
The Honor Guard of the academy during a parade in 1966

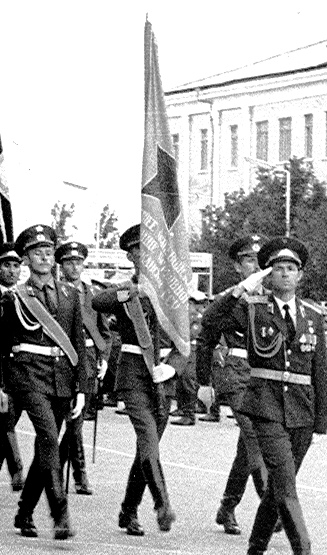
The march of the school colours

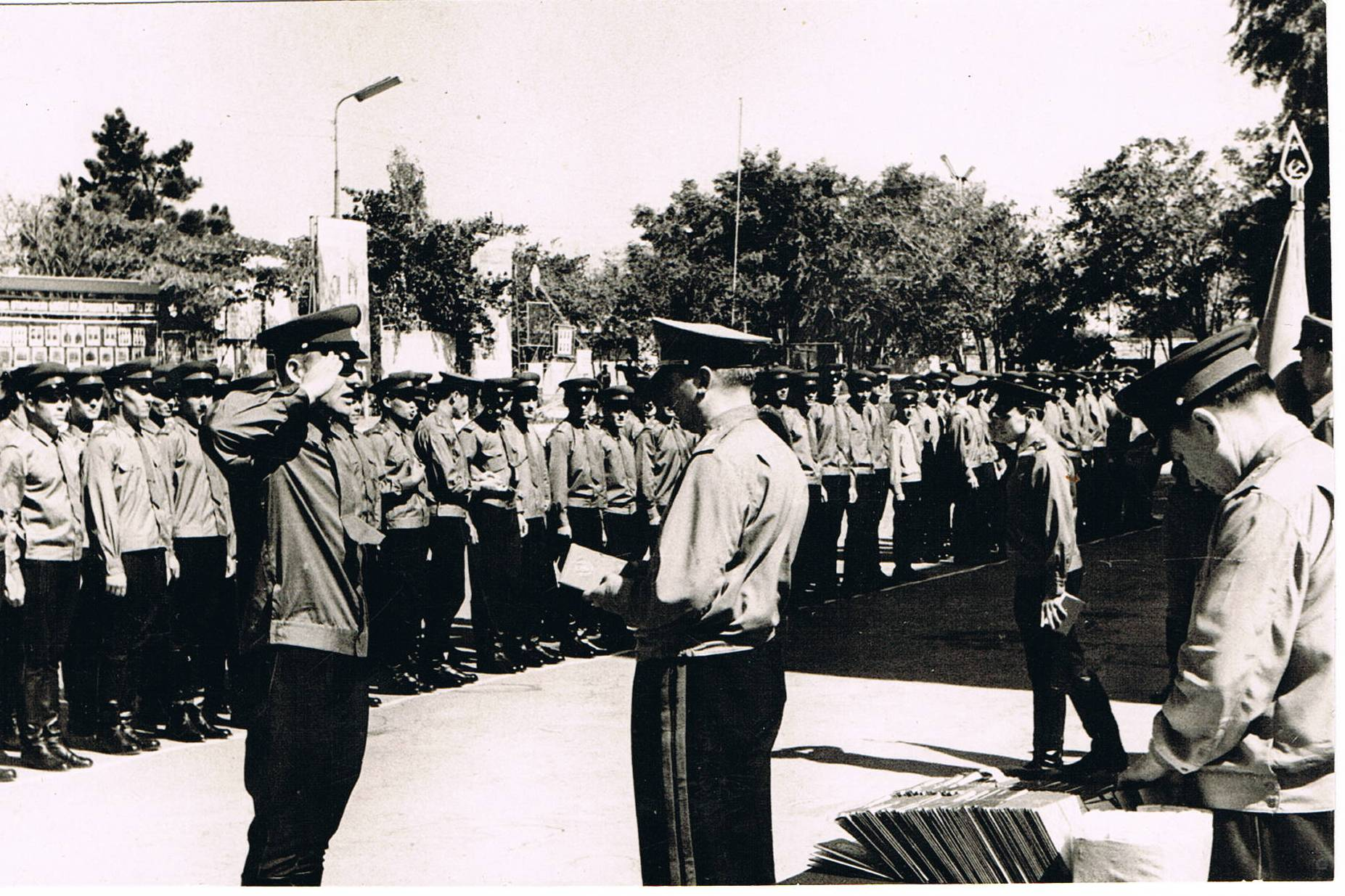
The release of lieutenants in 1968

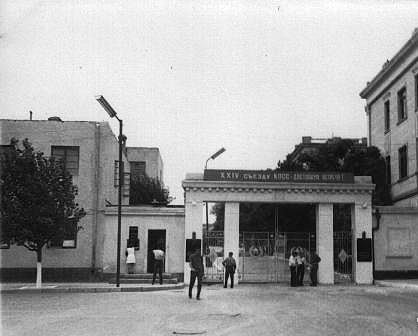
The headquarters of the school

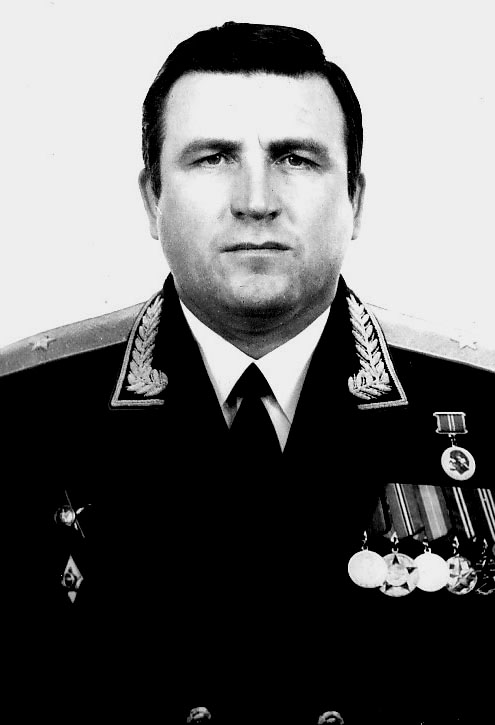
Major General Alexander Lobanov who commanded the school from 1987 to 1990

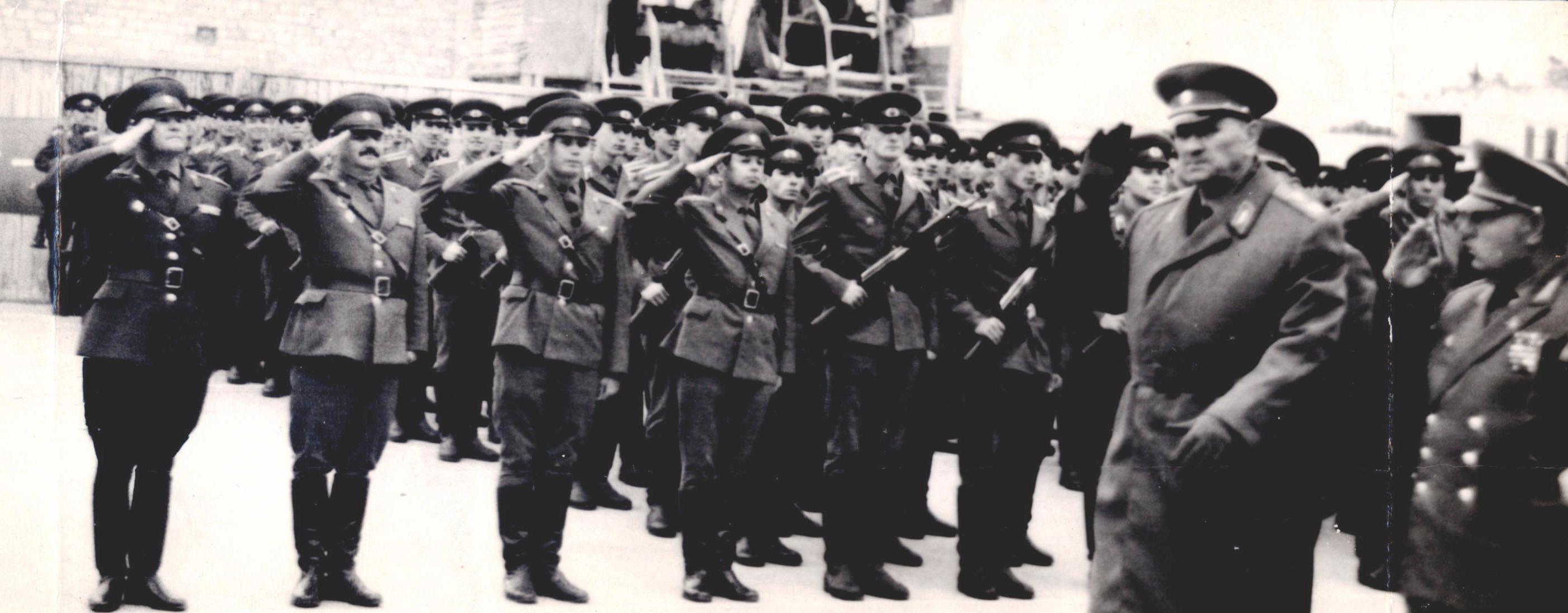
During a visit by Minister of Defense of the USSR Andrei Grechko in 1970

== See also ==
- Alma-Ata Higher All-Arms Command School
- Tbilisi Higher Artillery Command School
- Minsk Higher Military-Political School
