= Heydar Aliyev Military Institute =

Military institution in the Republic of Azerbaijan

- Azerbaijani: Heydər Əliyev adına Hərbi İnstitut
- The banner of the academy
- Former name: Baku Higher Combined Arms Command School
- Type: military academy
- Established: 1939
- Founder: Government of Azerbaijan
- Students: 700
- Location: Polad Hashimov Street, Baku, Azerbaijan
- Language: Azerbaijani
- Website: http://www.aahm.mod.gov.az/
- The official marchpast of the school is the Məktəbi marşı

The Heydar Aliyev Military Institute (Azerbaijani: Heydər Əliyev adına Hərbi İnstitut) is an educational institution of the Azerbaijani Armed Forces. In order to be admitted into the academy, candidates have to be between the ages of 17 and 19 and have completed secondary school education.

== Background ==
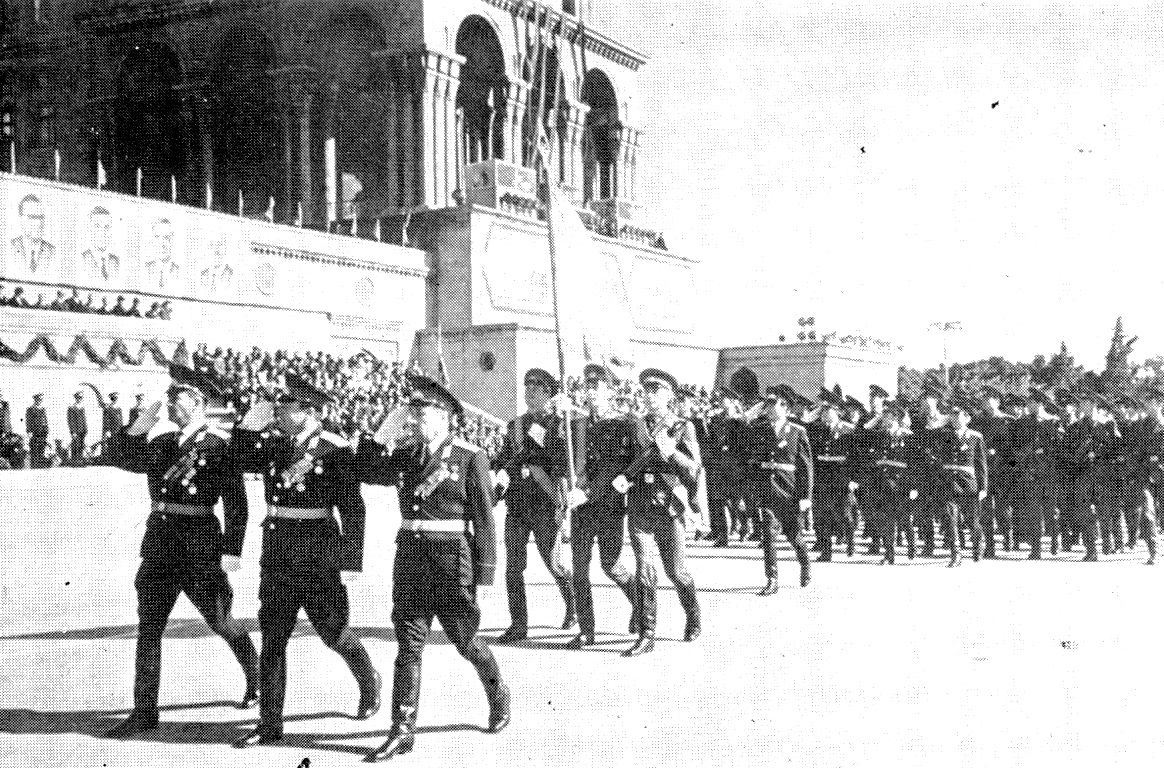
The BVOKU during the Azerbaijan SSR's Golden jubilee parade in 1970.

The predecessor institution to the current academy was the Baku Higher Combined Arms Command School (BVOKU), which was founded on 29 November 1939 as one of many military academies of the Soviet Army. By 1951, the developing school was ranked 6th place among the best infantry schools in the USSR. The school was disbanded in 1991 as a result of the fall of the Soviet Union. Among the notable alumni of the BVOKU are former defense minister of Armenia Seyran Ohanyan, Minister of Defense of Azerbaijan Zakir Hasanov and Armenian military leader during the Karabakh War Arkady Ter-Tadevosyan.

== Development ==
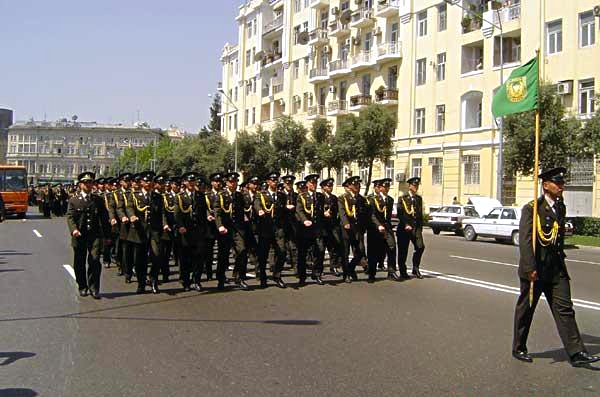
Cadets of the academy on parade.

The BVOKU was replaced the following year by the Baku High Joint Commanders School, which was created to meet the Azerbaijani military's needs. Some of the first graduates of the school took part in the First Nagorno-Karabakh War until it ended in the summer of 1994. Since 1997, the admission and teaching standards have been implemented in accordance with contemporary education standards. President Heydar Aliyev on 20 August 2001 renamed the school to its current name. His son, President Ilham Aliyev added the honorary name of Heydar Aliyev to the school's full name in March 2004, following his father's death just 3 months before. By presidential decree of 24 December 2015, the Azerbaijan Higher Naval Academy and the Azerbaijan High Military Aviation School were abolished and transferred to the Azerbaijan Higher Military Academy with the establishment of the corresponding faculties there.

== Present day ==
In order to improve the activities of the network of special-purpose educational institutions, by Decree No. 1626 of the President of the Republic of Azerbaijan Ilham Aliyev dated March 5, 2022, the Heydar Aliyev Military Institute was established on the basis of the Heydar Aliyev Higher Military School and placed under the subordination of the National Defense University.

== Academics ==
Graduates of the school are awarded a Bachelor's degree the rank of leytenant upon their commission into the armed forces.

=== Faculties and Specializations ===
- Faculty of Land Forces
  - Motorized rifle;
  - Tanker;
  - Ground artillery specialist;
  - Military intelligence specialist;
  - Specialist in radio-electronic intelligence and radio-electronic warfare;
  - Communicator;
  - Specialist in the field of fortification engineering;
  - Specialist in the operation and repair of missile and artillery weapons;
  - Specialist in the organization of educational work;
  - Organization of automation of land forces management;
- Air Force Faculty
  - Airplane pilots;
  - Helicopter pilots;
  - Specialist in the operation and repair of airplanes, helicopters and aviation engines;
  - Specialist in the operation and repair of aviation equipment of airplanes and helicopters;
  - Specialist in the operation and repair of aviation weapons;
  - Specialist in the operation and repair of aircraft radioelectronic equipment.
- Air Defense Faculty
  - Specialist in radio technical troops;
  - Specialist in air defense of the ground forces;
  - Specialist in the anti-aircraft missile troops.
- Naval Forces Faculty
  - Ship's navigator;
  - Specialist in ship weapons;
  - Ship radio technician;
  - Ship electromechanical.

=== Student life ===
In August 2019, the academy military band, led by Colonel Ekhtibar Aliyev, took part in the Spasskaya Tower Military Music Festival and Tattoo, representing Azerbaijan for the first time. In 2020, it was among the units that took part in the Baku Victory Parade in honor of the victory in the Second Nagorno-Karabakh War.

== Alumni ==
- Shukur Hamidov, National Hero of Azerbaijan
- Samid Imanov, member of the Special Forces of Azerbaijan
- Ilgar Mirzayev, colonel of artillery serving in the 3rd Army Corps until his death during the July 2020 Armenian–Azerbaijani clashes.
- Anar Novruzov, the "Father of AGS-17", who was killed in the 2016 Nagorno-Karabakh conflict.
- Hasan Hasanov, resident of the Kalbajar District killed in July 2014.

== Rectors of the School ==
- Major Ivan Kovalev (1992–2002)
- Lieutenant General Heydar Piriyev (2002–2009)
- Colonel Mirzali Yusifov (5 November 2013–?)
- Major General Fuzuli Salahov (?–Present)
