= Azerbaijani Army 100th Anniversary Medal =

Award of the Azerbaijani Armed Forces

Azerbaijani Army 100th anniversary medal
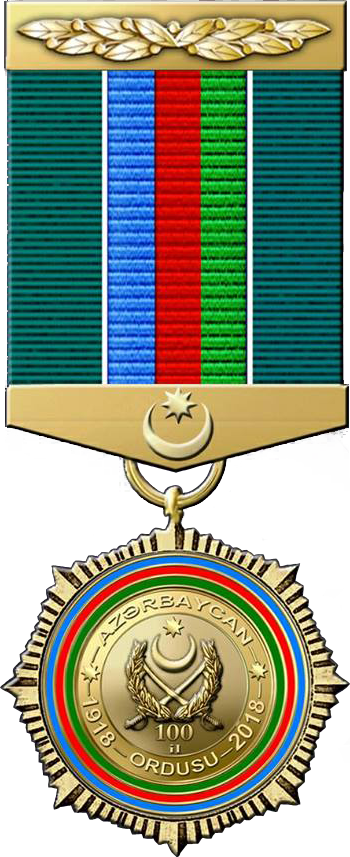
- Jubilee medal of 100th anniversary of the Azerbaijani army
- Type: medal
- Awarded for: 100th anniversary of the Azerbaijani Army
- Country: Azerbaijan
- Presented by: the state
- Eligibility: active military service before June 26, 2018
- Ribbon of the medal

Medal “100th anniversary of the Azerbaijani army” (Azerbaijani: Azərbaycan Ordusunun 100 illiyi (1918–2018) medalı) is a state award of Azerbaijan dedicated to the 100th anniversary of the Azerbaijani army. The award was established on June 30, 2017, in accordance with the law numbered 760-VQD.

== Description of the medal ==
The medal “100 years of the Azerbaijani army (1918–2018)” is a 37 mm x 50 mm rectangle connected with an eight-pointed star consisting of bronze. This in turn is covered by a golden surface.

== Basement for award ==
The medal is awarded to the serviceman of the Armed Forces of Azerbaijan who completed active military service until June 26, 2018. Besides, later retired are also awarded for their several efforts such as successes in combat training, special differences on exercises in combat training, courage, dedication and other merits in the period of military service and active participation in the creation and strengthening of the Azerbaijani army.

== The way of wearing ==
The medal “100 years of the Azerbaijani army (1918–2018)” is worn on the left side of the chest and with other orders and medals of Azerbaijan is placed after the medal “95th anniversary of the Armed Forces of Azerbaijan (1918–2013)”.

== Recipients ==
General Zubair Mahmood Hayat - Chairman, Joint Chief of Staff (Pakistan) (2016 - 2019)
