= Poghosagomer, Nagorno-Karabakh =

Poghosagomer / Devedashy Պողոսագոմեր / Dəvədaşı
- Location within Azerbaijan Location within East Zangezur Economic Region
- Coordinates: 40°07′18″N 46°37′00″E
- Country: Azerbaijan
  - District: Aghdara

Population (2015)
  - Total: 242
- Time zone: UTC+4 (AZT)

Poghosagomer (Armenian: Պողոսագոմեր) or Devedashy (Azerbaijani: Dəvədaşı) is a village located in the Aghdara District of Azerbaijan, in the region of Nagorno-Karabakh. Until 2023 it was controlled by the breakaway Republic of Artsakh. The village had an ethnic Armenian-majority population until the expulsion of the Armenian population of Nagorno-Karabakh by Azerbaijan following the 2023 Azerbaijani offensive in Nagorno-Karabakh.

== History ==
During the Soviet period, the village was part of the Mardakert District of the Nagorno-Karabakh Autonomous Oblast.

== Historical heritage sites ==
Historical heritage sites in and around the village include khachkars from between the 11th and 13th centuries, the 12th/13th-century Holy Savior Monastery (Armenian: Սուրբ Ամենափրկիչ վանք, romanized: Surb Amenaprkich Vank), a 12th/13th-century village and cemetery, a 13th-century chapel, and a 19th-century spring monument.

== Economy and culture ==
The population is mainly engaged in agriculture, animal husbandry, and mining. As of 2015, the village has a municipal building, a secondary school, two shops, and a medical centre. The community of Poghosagomer includes the village of Ghazarahogh.

== Demographics ==
The village had 157 inhabitants in 2005, and 242 inhabitants in 2015.
