= Qaraşlar =

- Location within Azerbaijan Location within Karabakh Economic Region
- Coordinates: 40°06′25.8″N 46°48′22.6″E
- Country: Azerbaijan
- Rayon: Aghdara
- Time zone: UTC+4 (AZT)
  - Summer (DST): UTC+5 (AZT)

Qaraşlar (Garashlar) is a village in the Aghdara District of Azerbaijan.
