= Tuzla Infantry School Command =

Military school in Istanbul, Turkey

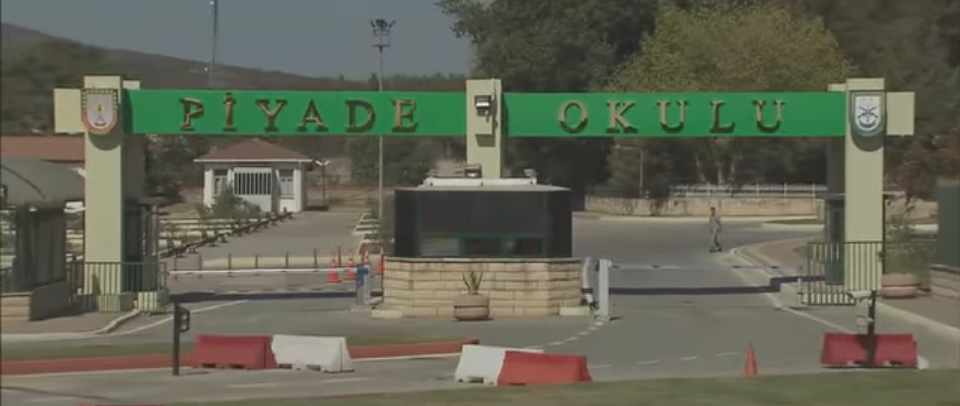
The building of the school.

The Tuzla Infantry School Command (Turkish: Piyade Okulu Komutanlığı) is located in Tuzla district of Istanbul. A military school that trains officers, non-commissioned officers and specialist sergeants belonging to the infantry class under the Turkish Land Forces Education and Doctrine Command (EDOK). It is Turkey's first and only infantry school.

== Overview ==
Founded in 1909, the school moved to Çankırı in 1941 and was named Infantry School in 1946. In 1961, it was moved to the Tuzla district of Istanbul. Courses are composed of the regiment command and the sub-units of the demonstration and exercise battalion command, and the class training of the infantry class officers, non-commissioned officers, specialist sergeants and lieutenants occur in the school. Trainings are given on subjects such as the use of infantry fighting vehicles and marksmanship.

== PKK attack ==
On February 12, 1994, a bomb was placed in a garbage container at the Tuzla Train Station by militants of the Kurdistan Workers' Party (PKK). As a result, 2 reserve officer candidate students and 3 soldiers were killed while waiting for a train at the station to go on leave.

== Notable alumni ==
- Hikmat Hasanov, an Azerbaijani major general who is the commander of the 1st Army Corps of Azerbaijan.

== See also ==
- Turkish War Academies
- School of Infantry
- United States Army Infantry School
