= Orta Güneypəyə =

- Location within Azerbaijan Location within Karabakh Economic Region
- Coordinates: 40°05′42″N 46°43′32″E
- Country: Azerbaijan
- Rayon: Aghdara
- Time zone: UTC+4 (AZT)
  - Summer (DST): UTC+5 (AZT)

Orta Güneypəyə (also, Orta Guneypeye and Orta Guneypaya) is a village in the Aghdara District of Azerbaijan.
