= Xatınbəyli =

Coordinates: 40°06′N 46°44′E

- Location within Azerbaijan Location within Karabakh Economic Region
- Country: Azerbaijan
- Rayon: Aghdara
- Time zone: UTC+4 (AZT)
  - Summer (DST): UTC+5 (AZT)

Xatınbəyli (Khatynbeyli) is a village in the Aghdara District of Azerbaijan.
