= Babak Samidli =

Azerbaijani military officer (1974–2020)

- Native name: Babək Mətləb oğlu Səmidli
- Born: Babak Matlab oglu Samidli; January 7, 1974; Goychay, Azerbaijani SSR, Soviet Union
- Died: November 23, 2020 (aged 46) Madagiz, Tartar District, Azerbaijan
- Allegiance: Azerbaijani Armed Forces
- Branch: Azerbaijani Land Forces
- Service years: 1992–2020
- Rank: Colonel
- Commands: 1st Army Corps (deputy commander)
- Conflicts: Second Nagorno-Karabakh War; Madagiz offensive

Babak Matlab oglu Samidli (Azerbaijani: Babək Mətləb oğlu Səmidli; 1974-2020) was an Azerbaijani military officer, and a colonel serving in the Azerbaijani Armed Forces. He was deputy commander of the 1st Army Corps.

== Life and service ==
Samidli was born in the Goychay District. In June 2018 he was promoted to rank of Lieutenant Colonel. During the 2020 Nagorno-Karabakh war, Samidli commanded Azerbaijani forces in the Madagiz offensive. On 27 October, he gave an interview to Euronews announcing the capture of the Madagiz dam. Samidli died post-armistice on 23 November 2020, near Madagiz (renamed to Sugovushan) from an exploded land-mine. Samidli was part of a group that consisted of Armenian officials, Red Cross officials, and Russian peacekeepers collecting dead bodies and identifying missing soldiers. Four Armenian officials and one Russian peacekeeper were slightly wounded in the blast. On 9 December, the President of Azerbaijan, Ilham Aliyev signed a decree to posthumously award Samidli the Zafar Order.
