= Martakert =

Town in Nagorno-Karabakh

Martakert / Aghdara Մարտակերտ / Ağdərə
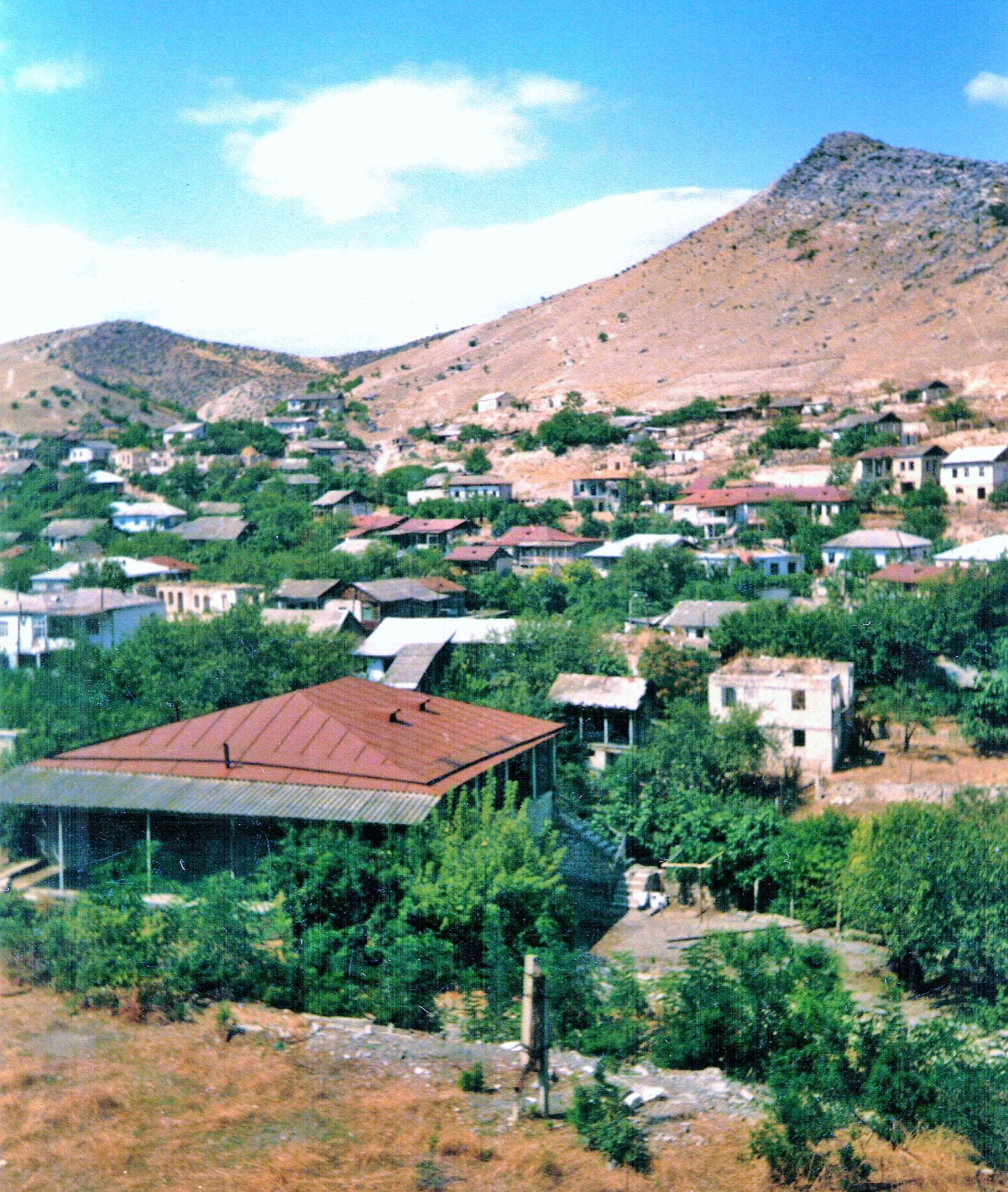
- Martakert in 2002

- Location within Azerbaijan Location within Republic of Artsakh Location within Karabakh Economic Region
- Coordinates: 40°12′55″N 46°48′46″E
- Country: Azerbaijan
  - District: Aghdara
- Elevation: 415 m (1,362 ft)

Population (2015)
  - Total: 4,600
- Time zone: UTC+4 (AZT)

Martakert (Armenian: Մարտակերտ, Russian: Мардакерт, also Mardakert, Մարդակերտ) or Aghdara (Azerbaijani: Ağdərə) is an Armenian town in the region of Nagorno-Karabakh, Azerbaijan. The town was previously controlled by the breakaway Republic of Artsakh, as the centre of its Martakert Province. The town had an ethnic Armenian-majority population, until the expulsion of the Armenian population of the city, as well as the Nagorno-Karabakh region as a whole. The town and the region of Martakert as a whole underwent heavy destruction by Azerbaijani forces while under their control during the First Nagorno-Karabakh War.

== Etymology ==
Traditionally, the Armenian name of the town is interpreted as consisting of the elements mard ('man, person,' or in this context 'brave') and -kert ('built by'), supposedly referring to the inhabitants' reputation for bravery. Other explanations link the name with the word matur’ ('chapel'). The Azerbaijani name for the settlement, Aghdara, translates to 'white river'.

== History ==
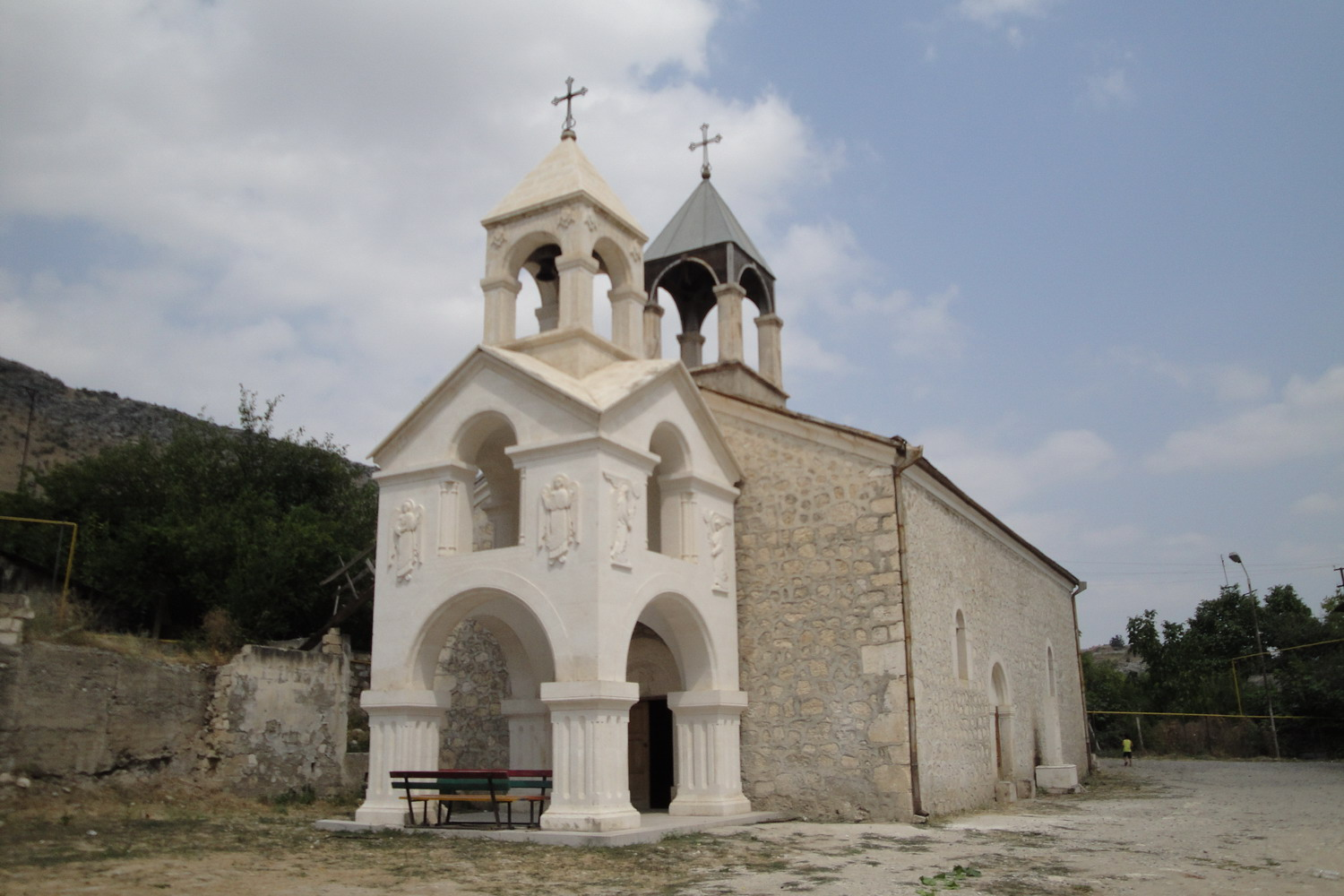
St. John the Baptist Church in Martakert

The site of the settlement was historically a part of the Melikdom of Jraberd, one of the Melikdoms of Karabakh.

In 1918, a battle took place near the town between Ottoman and Armenian forces where the latter emerged victorious.

During the Soviet period, Martakert was the administrative centre of the Martakert District of the Nagorno-Karabakh Autonomous Oblast. It received the status of an urban-type settlement in 1960.

=== Nagorno-Karabakh conflict ===
==== First Nagorno-Karabakh War ====
During the First Nagorno-Karabakh War (1991–94), Martakert and the surrounding district saw heavy fighting, especially during the Azerbaijani Operation Goranboy and the Mardakert and Martuni Offensives in 1992. The town was captured by Azerbaijani forces on 4 July 1992, forcing Martakert's Armenian population to flee the town. Martakert was heavily damaged during the First Nagorno-Karabakh War and many of its buildings remain ruined and uninhabited. According to Thomas Goltz, who was in Martakert in September 1992, the town became a "a pile of rubble", noting "more intimate detritus of destroyed private lives: pots and pans, suitcases leaking sullied clothes, crushed baby strollers and even family portraits, still in shattered frames". HRW later noted that harsh actions taken by Karabakh Armenian forces during and after the offensive against Aghdam were seen as a revenge for the Azeri destruction of Martakert, in the context of the tit-for-tat nature of the conflict. Martakert was recaptured by Armenian forces on 27 June 1993. The area around the town has been controlled by Artsakh since the end of the war. Some of Martakert's natives gradually returned over the years, but many remained in Armenia, Russia, and elsewhere.

==== Border clashes (1994–2020) ====
The situation in the area after the 1994 ceasefire

The 2008 Mardakert clashes began on 4 March after the 2008 Armenian election protests. It involved the heaviest fighting between ethnic Armenian and Azerbaijani forces over the disputed region of Nagorno-Karabakh since the 1994 ceasefire after the First Nagorno-Karabakh War.

Armenian sources accused Azerbaijan of trying to take advantage of ongoing unrest in Armenia. Azerbaijani sources blamed Armenia, claiming that the Armenian government was trying to divert attention from internal tensions in Armenia.

In 2020, some clashes along the ceasefire lines took place near Martakert.

==== Second Nagorno-Karabakh war ====
During the Second Nagorno-Karabakh war, the town was bombed by Azerbaijani forces more than once, resulting in civilian deaths.

==== 2023 Nagorno-Karabakh offensive ====
The town came under Azerbaijani control on 24 September 2023, following the 2023 Nagorno-Karabakh offensive.

== Geography ==
The town is located on the right bank of the Tartar River, between two mountains.

== Economy and culture ==
The population mainly works in different state institutions as well as with agriculture. As of 2015, Martakert has a municipal building, a house of culture, two schools, two kindergartens, a youth centre, 88 commercial enterprises, two factories and a regional hospital. The enlarged municipal community of Martakert includes the villages of Haykajur, Jraberd, Maralyan Sarov, and Levonarkh.

== Historical heritage sites ==
Historical heritage sites in and around the town include tombs from the 2nd–1st millennia BCE, the pre-Christian Kr’apasht Cemetery, the medieval village of T’aza Khach’, cemeteries from between the 17th and 19th centuries, St. John the Baptist Church (Surb Hovhannu Karapet Yekeghets’i) built in 1883 (possibly originating from as early as the 13th century), and a bridge across the Kusapat River from the early 20th century.

== Demographics ==
Year	Armenians		Azerbaijanis		Russians		Ukrainians		Total
1907	Mostly Armenian								4,676
1970	5,472	96.3%	135	2.4%	44	0.8%	9	0.2%	5,683
1979	6,264	93.6%	349	5.2%	41	0.6%	5	0.1%	6,690
2005	4,262	100%							4,262
2015	4,600	100%							4,600

== Climate ==
The climate in Martakert is classified as Humid subtropical climate (Cfa) by the Köppen climate classification.

Climate data for Mardakert, Nagorno-Karabakh Republic
Month	Jan	Feb	Mar	Apr	May	Jun	Jul	Aug	Sep	Oct	Nov	Dec	Year
Mean daily maximum °C (°F)	5.8 (42.4)	6.6 (43.9)	10.8 (51.4)	18.3 (64.9)	22.4 (72.3)	27.0 (80.6)	30.7 (87.3)	29.2 (84.6)	25.3 (77.5)	18.4 (65.1)	12.5 (54.5)	8.1 (46.6)	17.9 (64.3)
Mean daily minimum °C (°F)	−1.7 (28.9)	−1.0 (30.2)	2.3 (36.1)	8.1 (46.6)	12.5 (54.5)	16.7 (62.1)	20.0 (68.0)	19.0 (66.2)	15.4 (59.7)	9.7 (49.5)	4.8 (40.6)	0.6 (33.1)	8.9 (48.0)
Average precipitation mm (inches)	15 (0.6)	23 (0.9)	34 (1.3)	45 (1.8)	71 (2.8)	64 (2.5)	31 (1.2)	26 (1.0)	27 (1.1)	45 (1.8)	28 (1.1)	17 (0.7)	426 (16.8)
Source: http://en.climate-data.org/location/21905/

== Twin towns – sister cities ==
- Vagarshapat, Armenia (2010–2023).

Partnership agreement:

- Bourj Hammoud, Lebanon. In May 2018, representatives of the Artsakh city of Martakert and the Lebanese town of Bourj Hammoud signed a Memorandum of Cooperation. The memorandum states that aiming at the establishment of social, economic, tourism, and cultural relations between the two towns as well as realizing that cooperation between the towns can contribute to the strengthening of regional stability and peace.

== Gallery ==
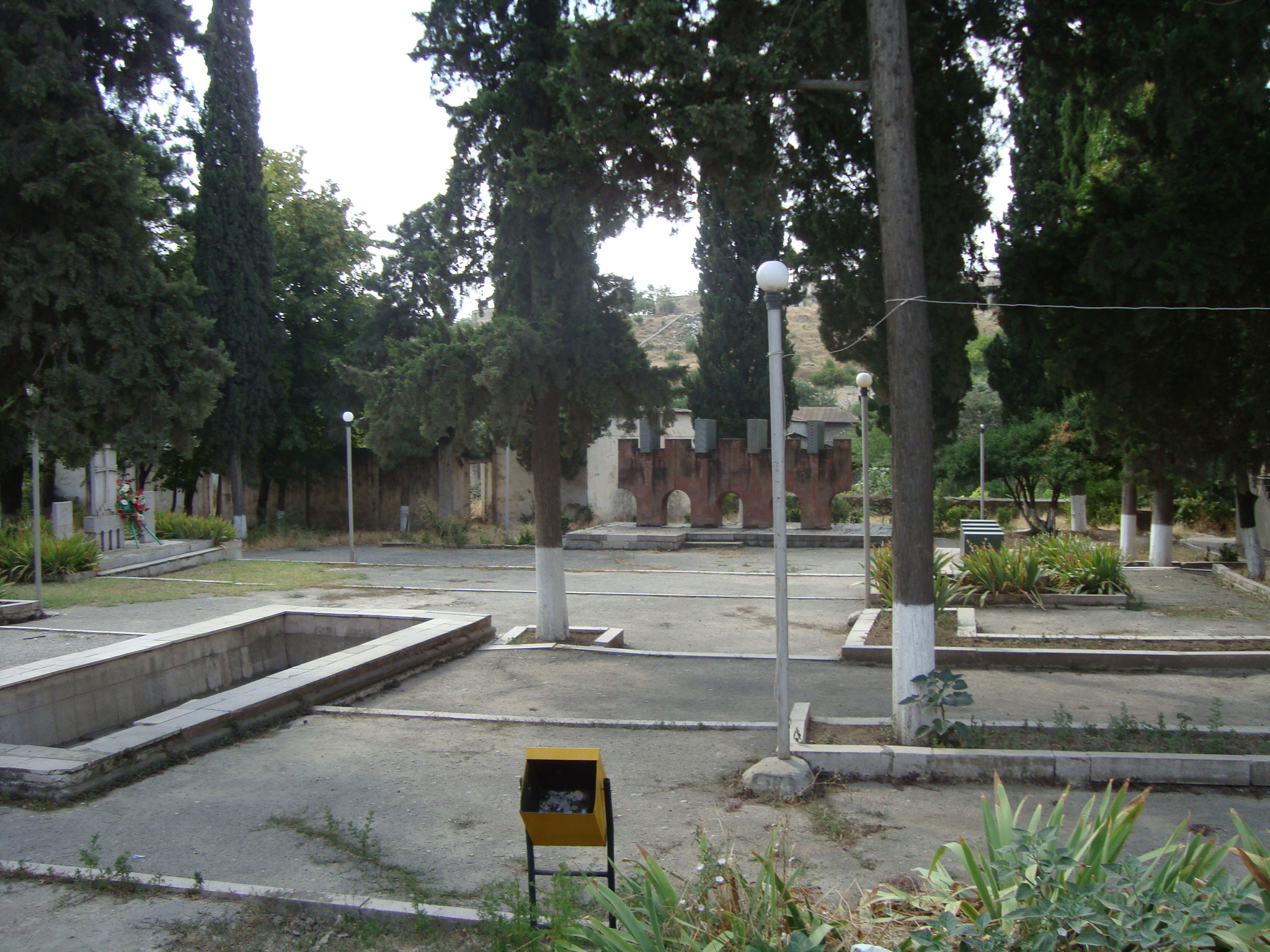
Park and monument in Martakert

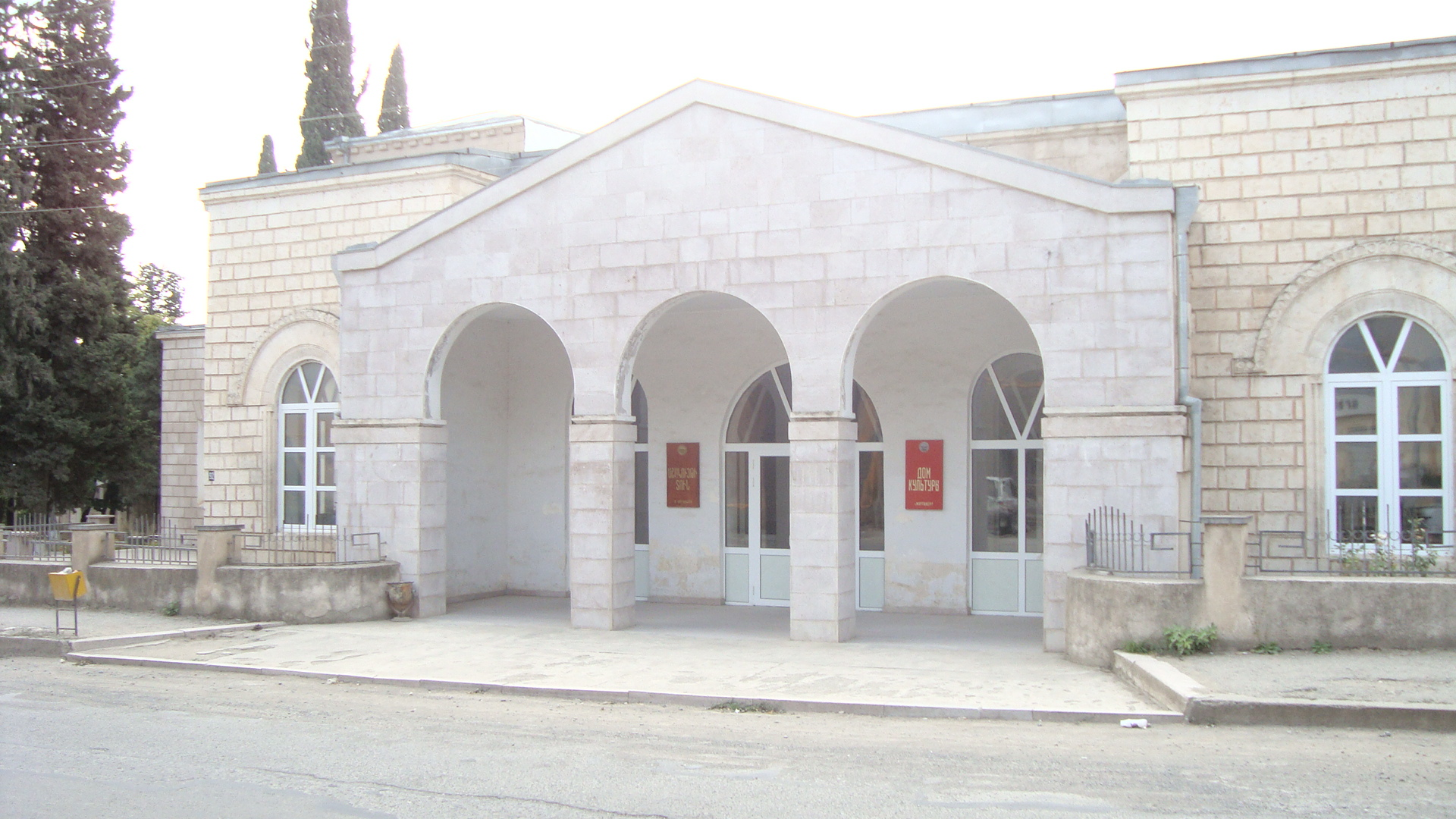
Martakert House of Culture

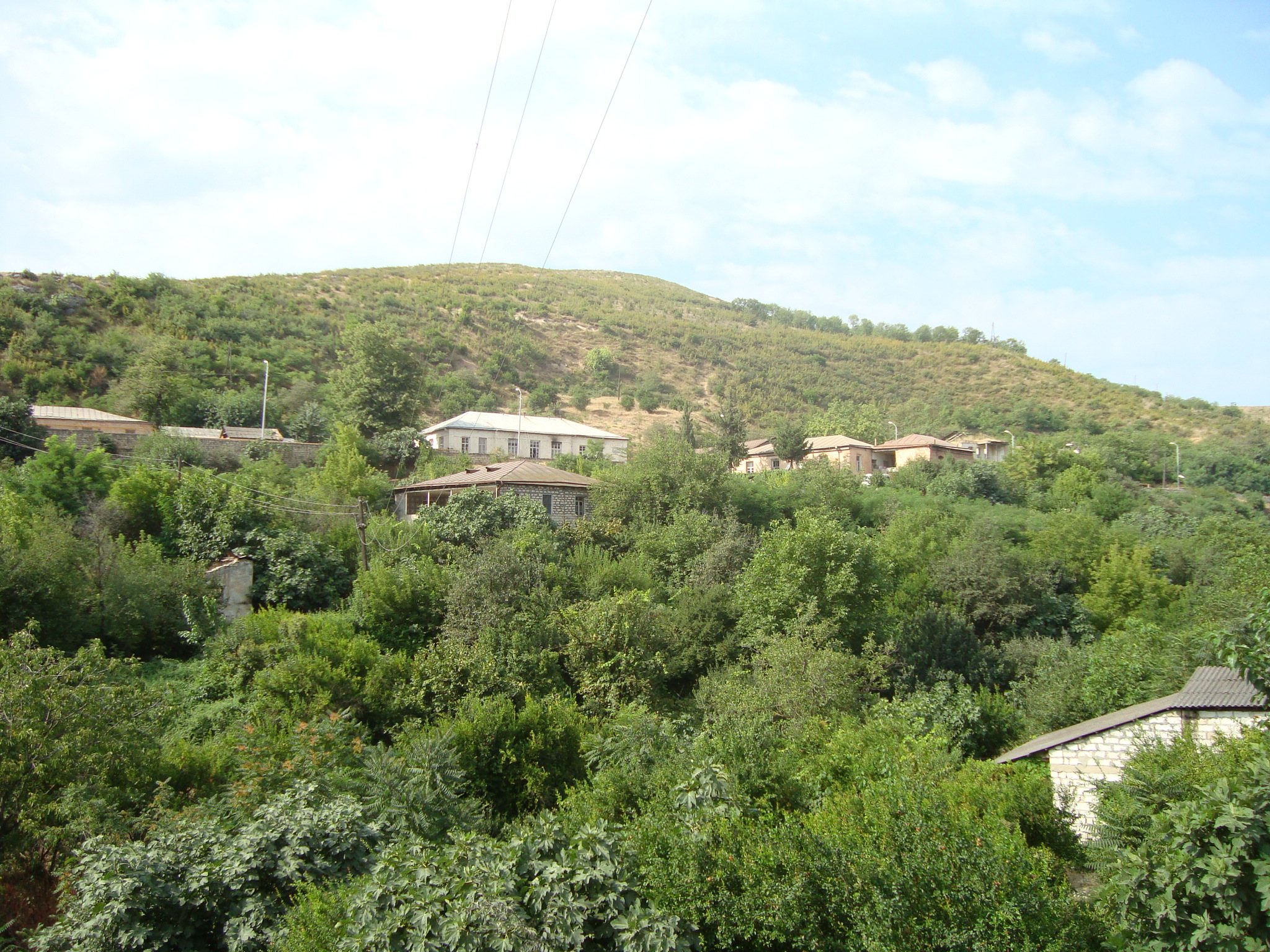
View from the town

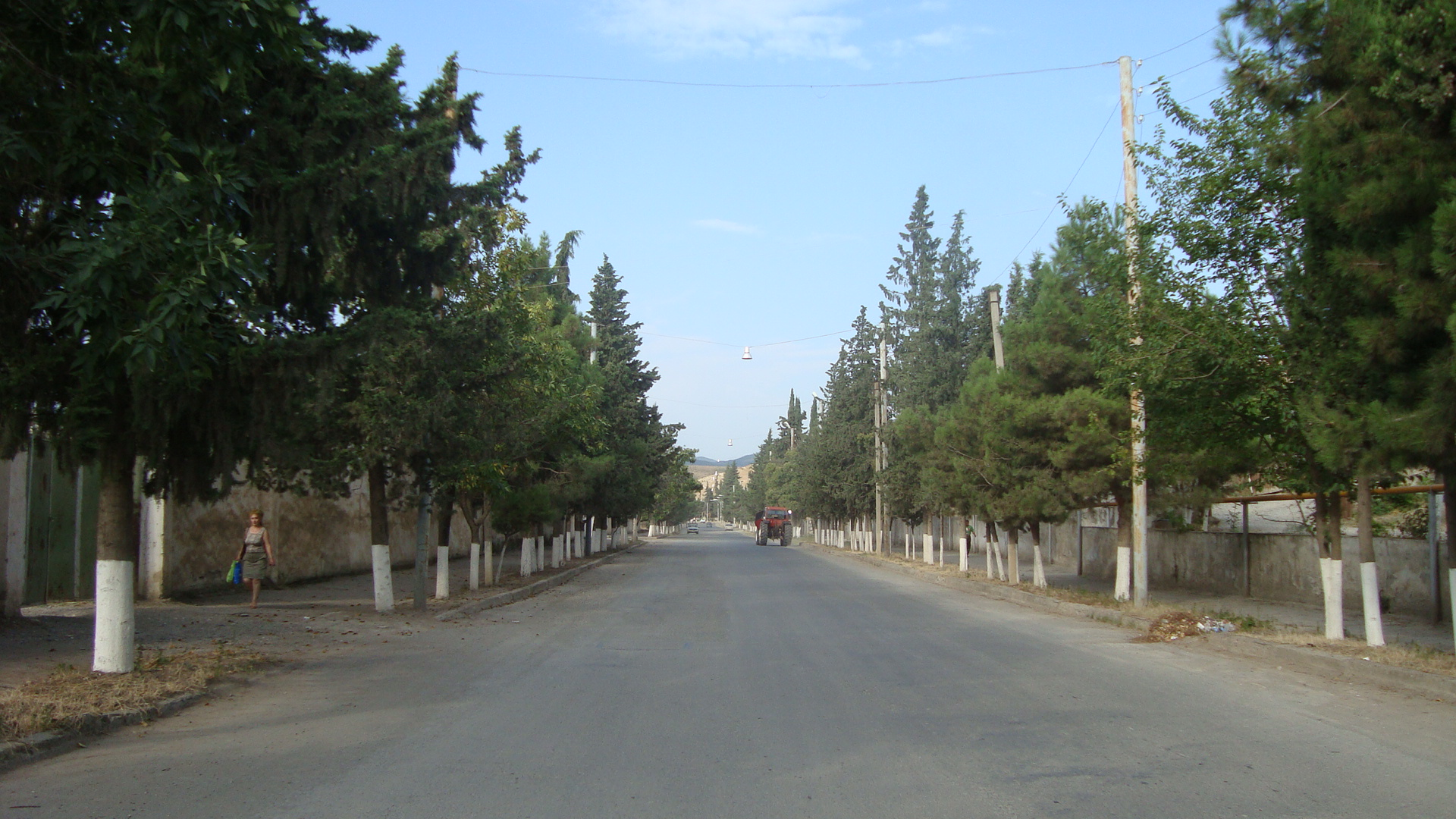
One of the main streets in Martakert

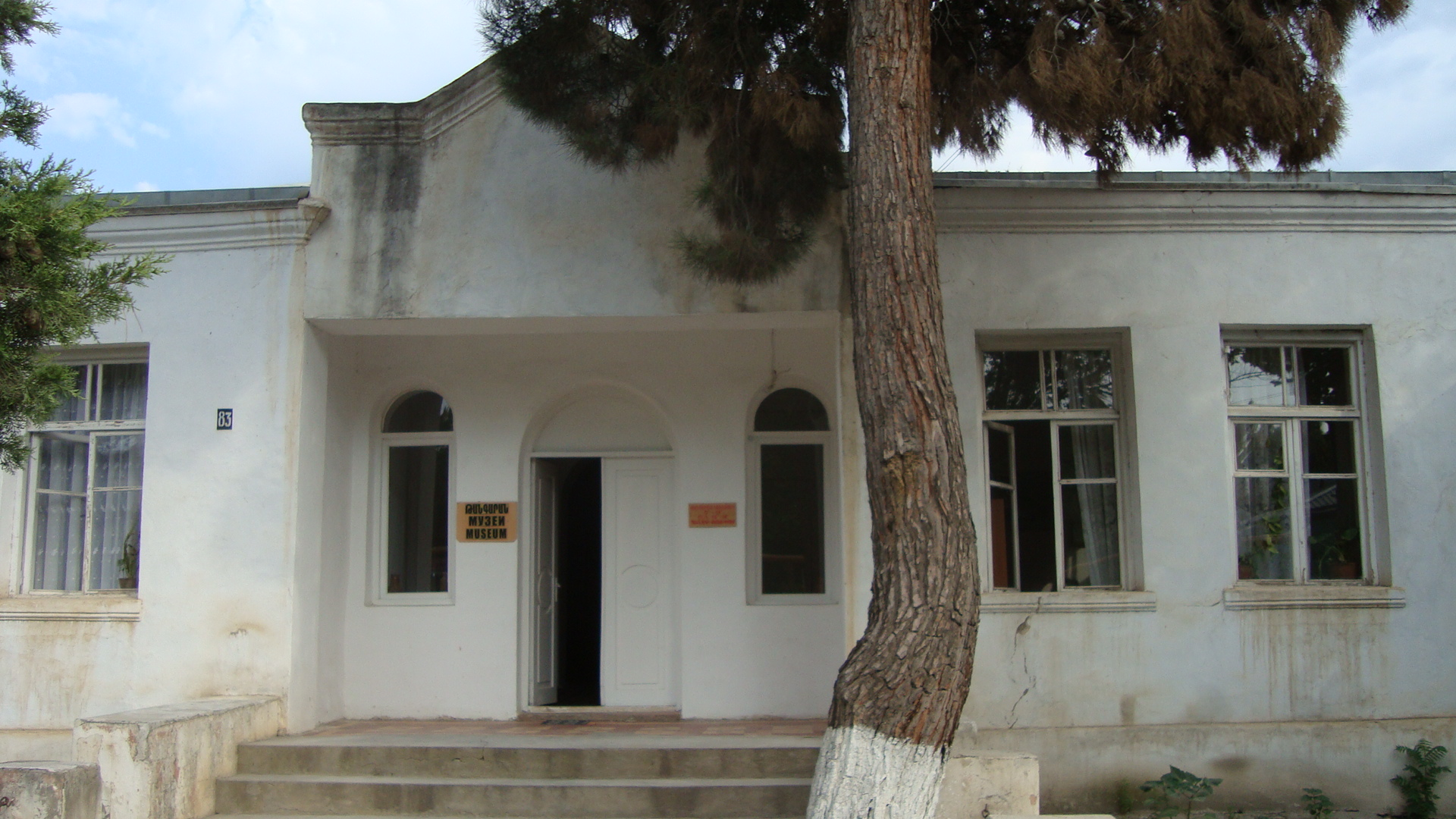
Martakert Museum

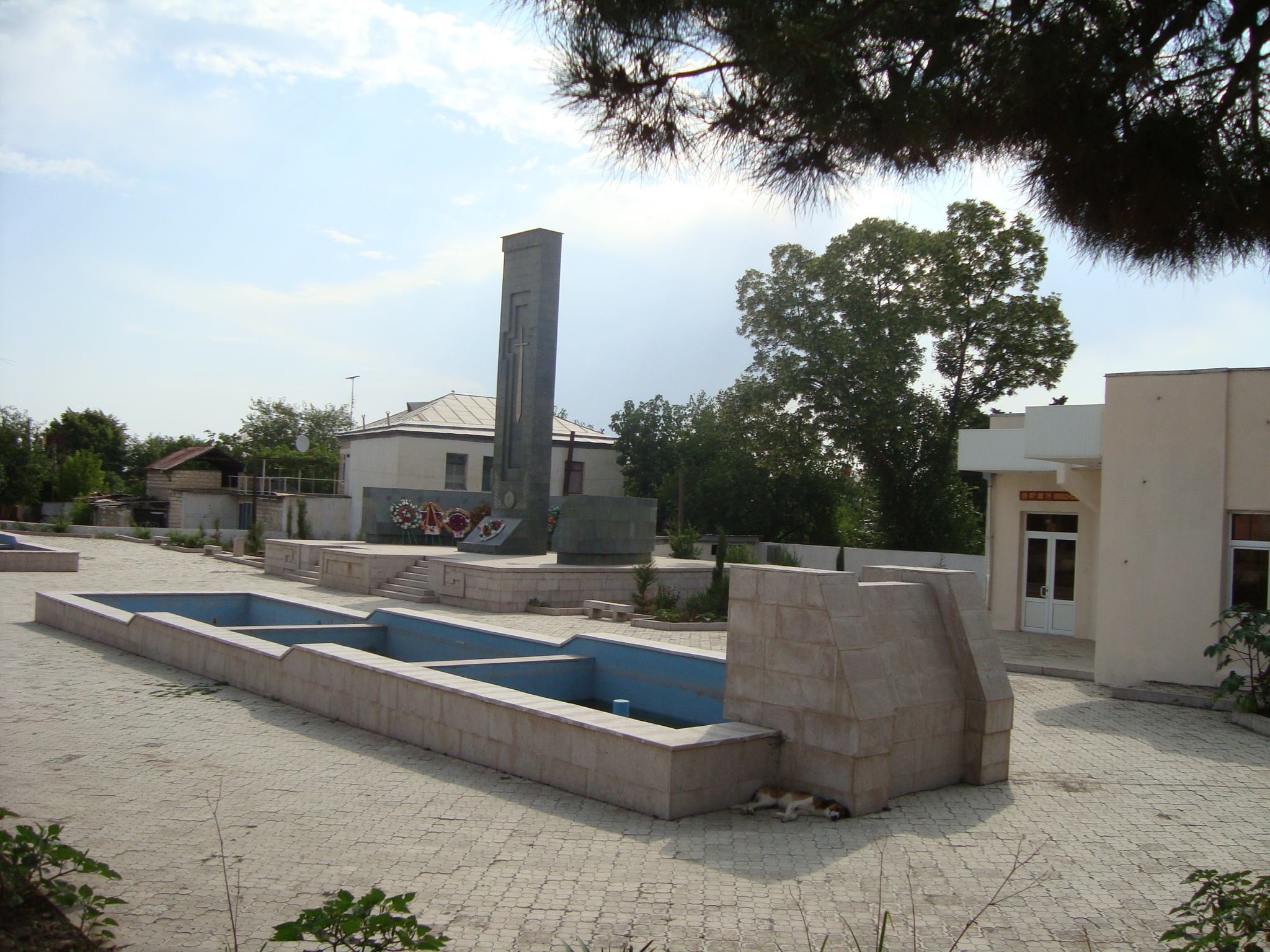
Monument in Martakert
