= Bridge of Jerveshtik =

Historic bridge in Armenia

Bridge
- Crosses: The river Jerveshtik

Characteristics
- Total length: 6.00 m (19.7 ft)
- Width: 3.30 m (10.8 ft)
- Height: 11.25 m (36.9 ft)

History
- Opened: 12th-13th centuries

The Bridge of Jerveshtik is a single-span bridge over the river Jerveshtik (named after Yeghishe Arakyal, Elisha the Apostle), in a deep gorge 400 metres north-west of the Yeghishe Arakyal Monastery, within 5 kilometres of Mataghis Village, Martakert Region, Nagorno-Karabakh Republic (NKR).

== History ==
There are no records of the construction of the bridge, but its architectural characteristics suggest that it was built in either the 12th or the 13th century.

At present only the piers of the bridge are preserved. It remains unknown when the bridge was destroyed, but this must have happened much earlier than the year 1884, as a traveller who saw it in the same year later wrote: "The bridge represents but three shaky beams covered with pieces of wood. About 200 feet beneath it in the opposite direction, amidst some prominent rocks, runs the stream Yeghishe Arakyal (Elisha the Apostle) in a tremendous roar..." The "shaky beams" connecting the piers fell to the ground long ago. The cornerstones of the vault-bearing arch of the bridge were finely-dressed; its other parts, and its elevated main pier in particular, were built of undressed stone and mortar.

Span length: 6.0 metres; passage width: 3.30 metres; height above water level according to the reconstruction of the bridge: 11.25 metres.
