= Baş Güneypəyə =

Village in Aghdara District, Azerbaijan

Bash Guneypeye Բաշ Գյունեյփայա Baş Güneypəyə
- Location within Azerbaijan
- Coordinates: 40°05′44″N 46°40′48″E
- Country: Azerbaijan
- District: Aghdara
- Time zone: UTC+4 (AZT)

Bash Guneypeye (Armenian: Բաշ Գյունեյփայա: Azerbaijani: Baş Güneypəyə) is a village located in the Aghdara District of Azerbaijan. Following a two-day offensive from September 19 to September 20, 2023, it was retaken under the control of Azerbaijan.
