= Ghazarahogh =

Ghazarahogh Ղազարահող
- Gazarahox
- Location within Azerbaijan Location within East Zangezur Economic Region
- Coordinates: 40°07′53.7″N 46°37′24.7″E
- Country: Azerbaijan
  - District: Kalbajar

Population (2015)
  - Total: 74
- Time zone: UTC+4 (AZT)

Ghazarahogh (Armenian: Ղազարահող; Azerbaijani: Gazarahox) is a village located in the Kalbajar District of Azerbaijan, in the region of Nagorno-Karabakh. Until 2023 it was controlled by the breakaway Republic of Artsakh. The village had an ethnic Armenian-majority population until the expulsion of the Armenian population of Nagorno-Karabakh by Azerbaijan following the 2023 Azerbaijani offensive in Nagorno-Karabakh.

== History ==
During the Soviet period, the village was a part of the Mardakert District of the Nagorno-Karabakh Autonomous Oblast.

== Historical heritage sites ==
Historical heritage sites in and around the village include a medieval village, church, chapel and cemetery.

== Economy and culture ==
The population is mainly engaged in agriculture, animal husbandry, and mining. The village is part of the community of Poghosagomer.

== Demographics ==
The village had 75 inhabitants in 2005, and 74 inhabitants in 2015.
