= Bəşirlər =

- Interactive map of Bəşirlər
- Country: Azerbaijan
- Rayon: Aghdara
- Time zone: UTC+4 (AZT)
  - Summer (DST): UTC+5 (AZT)

Bəşirlər (Bashirler) is a village in the Aghdara District of Azerbaijan.
