= Talish, Aghdara =

Talish Թալիշ
- Talış
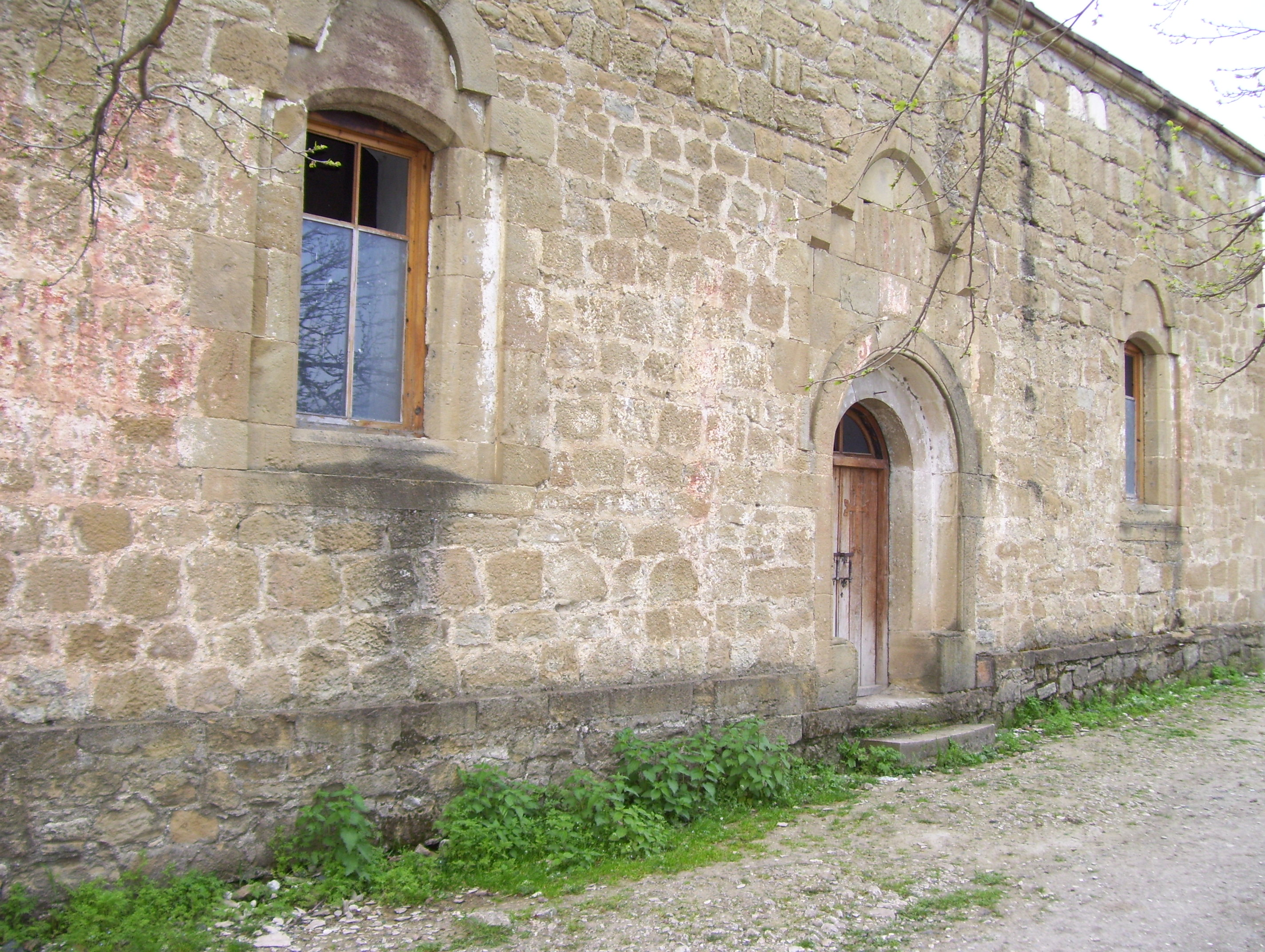
- The Holy Savior Church in the village, built in 1894.

- Location within Azerbaijan Location within Karabakh Economic Region
- Coordinates: 40°22′53″N 46°44′27″E
- Country: Azerbaijan
- District: Aghdara

Population (2023)
  - Total: 90
- Time zone: UTC+4 (AZT)

Talish (Azerbaijani: Talış,; Armenian: Թալիշ) is a village in the Aghdara District in Azerbaijan, in the disputed region of Nagorno-Karabakh. The village had an ethnic Armenian-majority population prior to the 2020 Nagorno-Karabakh war, and also had an Armenian majority in 1989.

== History ==
During the Soviet period, the village was part of the Mardakert District of the Nagorno-Karabakh Autonomous Oblast. During the course of the Nagorno-Karabakh conflict, the side controlling the village has changed on numerous occasions. During the First Nagorno-Karabakh War, the village last changed hands when the village was recaptured by Armenian forces from the Azerbaijani side on 11 April 1994. After the war, the village was administrated as part of the Martakert Province of the breakaway Republic of Artsakh.

During the 2016 Armenian-Azerbaijani clashes, the village was severely damaged and was temporarily captured by Azerbaijani forces after most of its population had been evacuated, but was recaptured by Armenian forces before the end of the clashes. After the village was recaptured, an elderly Armenian couple was found executed in their home with their ears cut off.

On 27 September 2020, the 2nd Nagorno Karabakh War broke out with Azerbaijan immediately launching an offensive towards the village and its surrounding areas. On 3 October 2020 Azerbaijan captured the village, and later on 9 October confirmatory footage of the town was released by Azerbaijani authorities. Resettlement of the village by Azerbaijanis began in March 2023, with 20 families moving back to Talish.

== Historical heritage sites ==
Historical heritage sites in and around the village include an Armenian church built in 1151, a 12th/13th-century khachkar, the monastery of Horeka (Armenian: Հոռեկա վանք, romanized: Horeka Vank, also known as the monastery of Glkho, Գլխո) built in 1279–1284, the 13th-century village of Dyutakan (Դյութական), a 17th-century Armenian church, a cemetery from between the 17th and 19th centuries, the manor house of the Melik-Beglaryans (Armenian: Մելիք-Բեգլարյանների ապարանք, romanized: Melik-Beglaryanneri Aparank) built in 1727, a 19th-century spring monument, and the church of Surb Amenaprkich (Armenian: Սուրբ Ամենափրկիչ, lit. 'Holy Savior') built in 1894.

== Demographics ==
In 1897, the village had a population of 1,155 consisting of 623 men and 532 women, 1,148 or 99.4 percent of whom were Armenian Apostolic.

The village had 581 inhabitants in 2005, and 597 inhabitants in 2015.

On 16 March 2023, 20 Azerbaijani families (90 people) resettled in village. According to the program, 158 families are expected to be relocated to the village.

== Notable people ==
- Gor Agbaljan, Armenian professional footballer

== Gallery ==
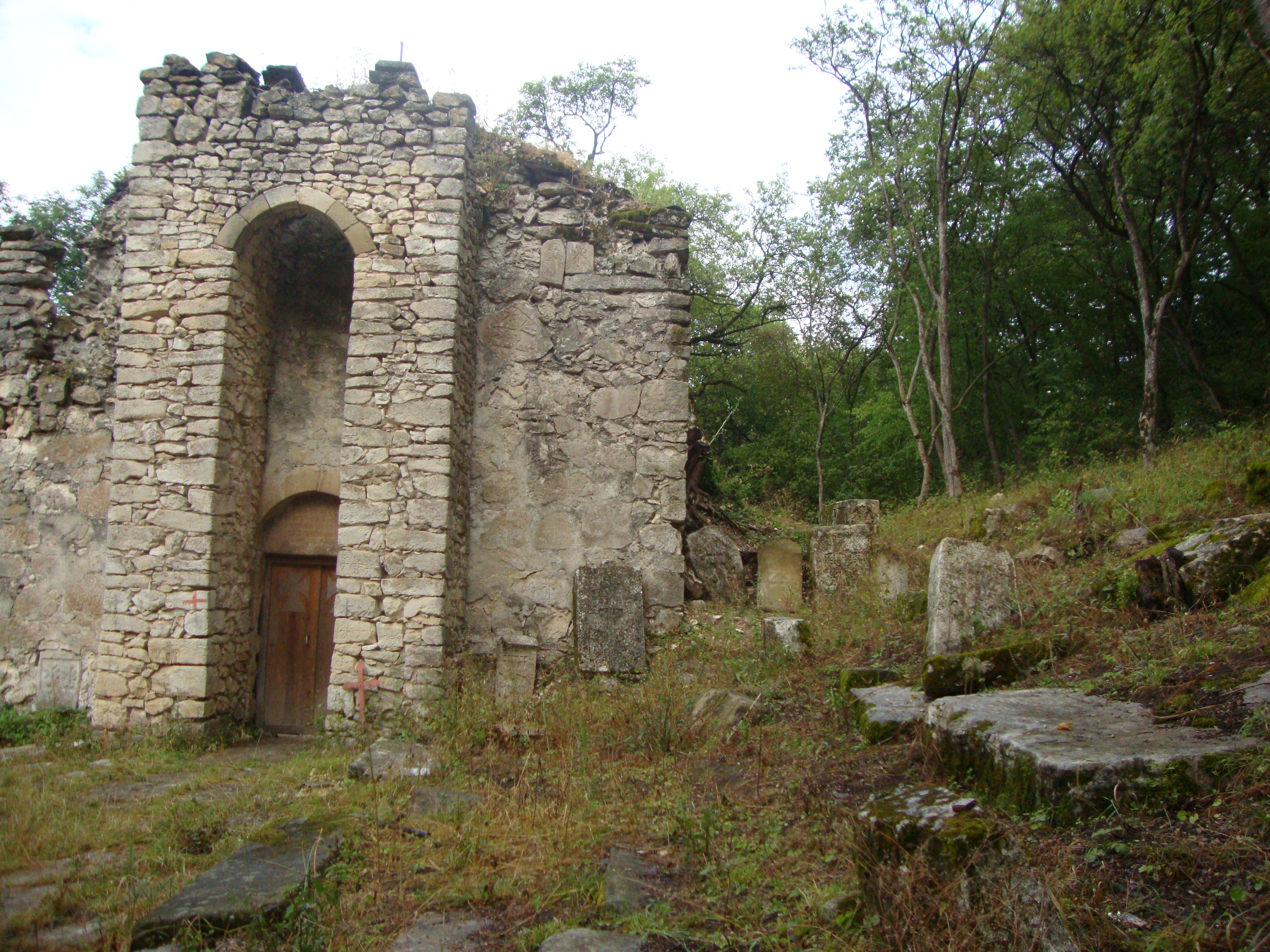
Horeka Monastery, a 13th-century monastic complex near the village
