= Hikmat Hasanov =

Azerbaijani military officer (born 1975)

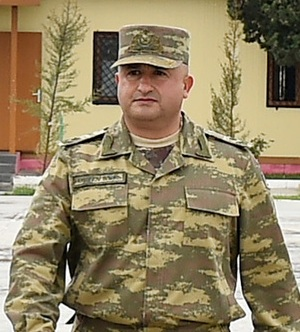
- Hasanov at a military parade in Baku in mid-2018
- Native name: Hikmət Hüseyn oğlu Həsənov
- Born: Hikmat Huseyn oglu Hasanov; October 9, 1975 (age 50); Pirəhmədli, Fuzuli District, Azerbaijan SSR, Soviet Union
- Allegiance: Azerbaijani Armed Forces
- Branch: Azerbaijani Land Forces
- Service years: 1993–
- Rank: Major general
- Commands: 1st Army Corps
- Conflicts: First Nagorno-Karabakh War; Four-Day War; Second Nagorno-Karabakh War
- Awards: "For Faultless Service" medal; "90th Anniversary of the Armed Forces of Azerbaijan (1918–2008)" Medal; Azerbaijani Army 100th anniversary medal; For service to the Fatherland Order
- Education: Baku Higher Combined Arms Command School; Tuzla Infantry School Command; Nanjing Land Forces Higher Military Academy of the People's Liberation Army

Hikmat Huseyn oglu Hasanov (Azerbaijani: Hikmət Hüseyn oğlu Həsənov; born 1975) is a major general of Azerbaijan, who was the commander of the 1st Army Corps (December 2014 - August 2021). He is a laureate of the 3rd degree "For Service to the Fatherland" order.

== Life and service ==
Hikmat Hasanov was born on 9 October 1975 in Pirəhmədli, Fuzuli District, then Azerbaijani SSR of the Soviet Union. In 1992, he entered the Baku Higher Combined Arms Command School. He began his service as a platoon commander in the military unit "N" in Tartar District. In 1994, he took a 6-month course at the Infantry School Command in Tuzla, Turkey. In 2002, he entered the Nanjing Land Forces Higher Military Academy of the People's Liberation Army of China to continue his education. He graduated from the academy with honors and was awarded a special badge. In 1995, he graduated from the military school and began serving in the "N" brigade in the Aghdam District. He was promoted to unit commander, and then battalion commander.

In 2013, he went to Germany to further his education, took a NATO operational planning course, and practiced as a staff officer at NATO's operational headquarters. In 2014, by the order of the President Ilham Aliyev, he was appointed Chief of Staff of the newly formed, restructured Nakhchivan Special General Army.

On 26 June 2014, on the 96th anniversary of the establishment of the Azerbaijani Armed Forces, he was promoted to the rank of Major General.

During the 2016 Nagorno–Karabakh clashes, he commanded the battles in Aghdam, Tartar, and Goranboy districts. During the 2020 Nagorno-Karabakh conflict, he led the clashes in Suqovuşan, which was captured by the Azerbaijani forces on 3 October. On 9 December, Aliyev signed a decree awarding Hasanov the Karabakh Order.

Hasanov is fluent in English, Russian, Turkish, Persian and Armenian.
