= Madagiz offensive =

Offensive in the Second Nagorno-Karabakh War

- Part of the Second Nagorno-Karabakh War
Date	27 September 2020 – 3 October 2020 (6 days)
Location	Tartar District, Azerbaijan
Result	Azerbaijani victory
Territorial changes	Azerbaijani forces seized control of Talish and Madagiz

Belligerents
Azerbaijan	Artsakh; Armenia

Commanders and leaders
Hikmat Hasanov; Babak Samidli	Edgar Markosyan

Units involved
Azerbaijani Armed Forces; Azerbaijani Land Forces; 1st Corps; Azerbaijani Air Forces	Artsakh Defence Army; Armed Forces of Armenia

The Madagiz offensive, also called the Battle of Madagiz (Azerbaijani: Madagiz döyüşü; Armenian: Մատաղիսի ճակատամարտ, romanized: Mataghisi chakatamart), or the Battle of Sugovushan (Azerbaijani: Suqovuşan döyüşü), was a military operation launched by Azerbaijan against the self-proclaimed Republic of Artsakh and their Armenian allies during the Second Nagorno-Karabakh War. The offensive began on 28 September, when the Azerbaijani forces advanced towards Armenian positions near the abandoned village of Talish. By 3 October, the Azerbaijani forces had seized control of Talish, and the town of Madagiz.

== Timeline ==
On 27 September 2020, clashes broke out in the disputed Nagorno-Karabakh region, which is de facto controlled by Artsakh, but de jure part of Azerbaijan. This was followed by an offensive launched by the Azerbaijani Armed Forces in the direction of Talish and Madagiz next day, with the Azerbaijani forces had gaining control of a "strategic high ground" around Talish. On 29 September, the Azerbaijani authorities stated that their aerial and ground forces destroyed a mixed column of Armenian military vehicles travelling from Madagiz, together with an artillery battery. They also stated that the Azerbaijani forces had destroyed an Armenian position near Talish. On 2 October, the Azerbaijani forces captured and took control of dominant heights around Madagiz, By 3 October, the Azerbaijani forces had seized control of Talish and Madagiz, as well as the latter's strategic dam. On 9 October, the Azerbaijani authorities released confirmatory footage from Talish and Madagiz.

== Aftermath ==
On 3 October, Madagiz was renamed to Sugovushan by the decree of Ilham Aliyev, the President of Azerbaijan.

Azerbaijani colonel Babak Samidli, deputy commander of the 1st Army Corps, died from a land-mine explosion on 23 November, during a post-armistice search for the bodies of missing soldiers in Madagiz.
