= 1st Army Corps (Azerbaijan) =

- Azerbaijani: 1-ci Ordu Korpusu
- Badge of the 1st Army Corps
- Active: 3 March 1992
- Country: Azerbaijan
- Branch: Azerbaijani Land Forces
- Garrison/HQ: Barda
- Nickname: "Barda Army Corps" or "Yevlakh Army Corps"
- Engagements: 2020 Nagorno-Karabakh war: Madagiz offensive

Commanders
- Current commander: Hikmat Hasanov
- Notable commanders: Najmeddin Sadikov

The 1st Army Corps (Azerbaijani: 1-ci Ordu Korpusu), also referred to as the Barda Army Corps, is a regional military formation of the Azerbaijani Land Forces. It is considered to be the most dangerous, strategic post of the Armed Forces. Most of its units are located on the Armenian border with Nagorno-Karabakh. It is currently led by Major General Hikmat Hasanov. It is currently deployed from Barda, a town located south of Yevlakh near Ganja.

== History ==
It was established on 3 March 1992, descending from Azerbaijani 701st Motor Rifle Brigade, 708th Motor Rifle Brigade, and the 130th Motor Rifle Brigade. The former Chief of the General Staff of the Armed Forces General Najmaddin Sadikov made a great contribution to the establishment of the military unit, becoming the first commander of the unit. Among the operations it took part in were the Battle of Kalbajar.

=== Karabakh operations ===
During the 2020 Nagorno-Karabakh conflict, the corps took part in clashes in Madagiz. It would later be captured by the Azerbaijani forces on 3 October. On 9 December, President Ilham Aliyev signed a decree to award General Hasanov with the Karabakh Order, congratulating the corps at the same time for their work. Deputy corps commander Babak Samidli led part of the corps in the Madagiz offensive, giving an interview to Euronews on 27 October announcing the capture of the Sarsang Reservoir. He was later killed by a mine in a post ceasefire collection of bodies.

== Composition ==
The corps HQ is in Barda, Azerbaijan. Among the brigades is the 701st Motorized Rifle Brigade, the first unit in the military. The brigades have artillery, tank, anti-tank, reconnaissance, communication and other subdivisions. The armament of choice are the T-72 tanks, BTR-82A armored personnel carriers, and the BMP-2. The total staff of the brigades are estimated at 3500-4000 people.

== Commanders ==
- Major General Nizam Osmanov (2002–2014)
- Major General Hikmat Hasanov (since 2014)

== Gallery ==
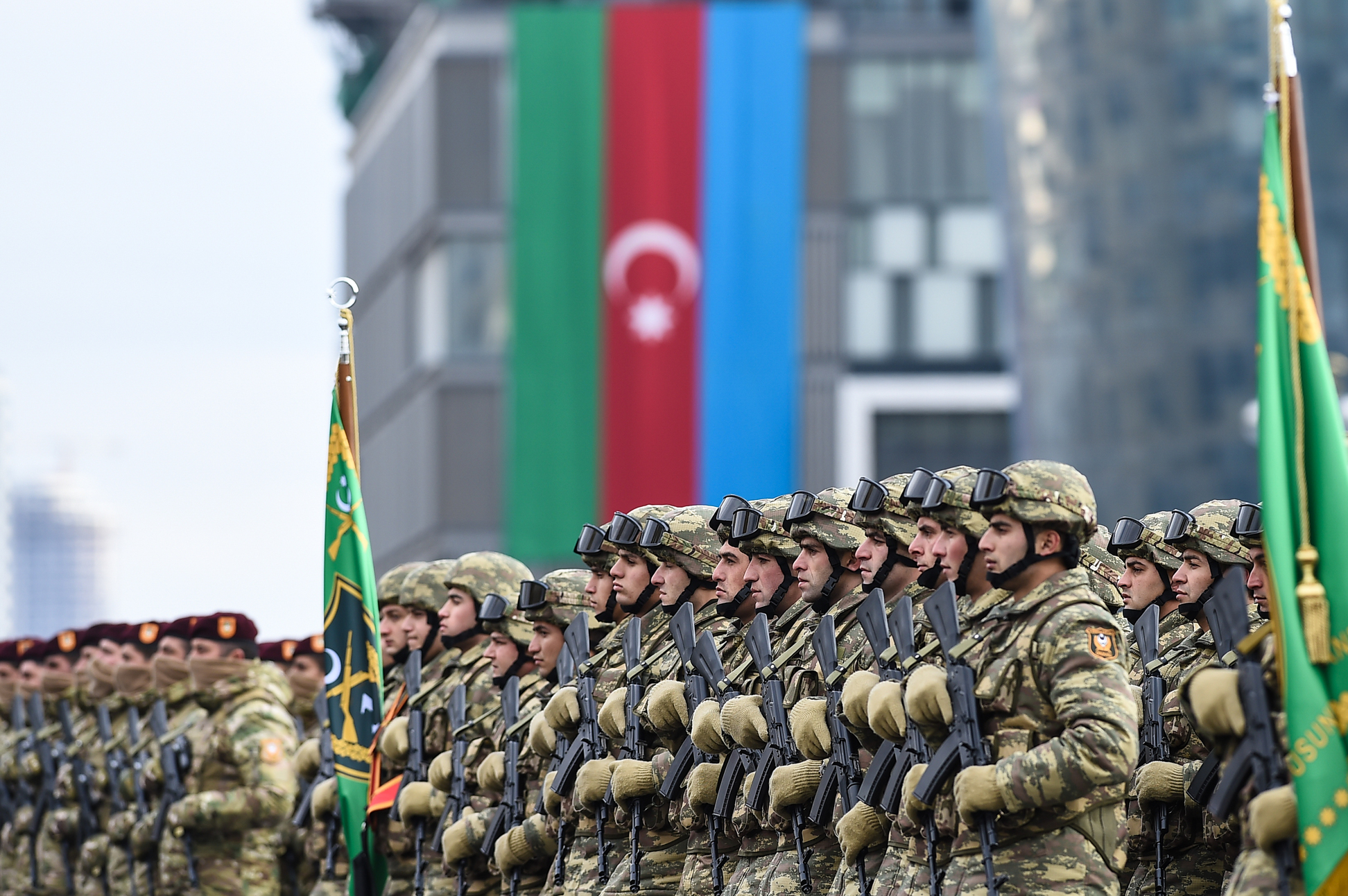
Members of the corps at the Baku Victory Parade of 2020.

== See also ==
- Nakhchivan Garrison
