= Gor Agbaljan =

Armenian professional footballer

Personal information
- Date of birth: 25 April 1997 (age 29)
- Place of birth: Talış, Azerbaijan
- Height: 1.83 m (6 ft 0 in)
- Position: Midfielder

Youth career
- 2001: Turan
- 2001–2008: VV Flevo sBoys
- 2008–2016: SC Heerenveen

Senior career*
Years	Team	Apps	(Gls)
2016–2018	Heracles Almelo	1	(0)
2018–2019	Go Ahead Eagles	3	(0)
2022–2023	Staphorst	5	(0)

International career
2015	Armenia U19	6	(0)
2016–2017	Armenia U21	3	(0)
- * Club domestic league appearances and goals as of 12 May 2019

Gor Agbaljan (born 25 April 1997) is an Armenian professional footballer who most recently played for Dutch club Staphorst, as a midfielder.

== Career ==
Born in Talış, Agbaljan has played club football for Heracles Almelo and Go Ahead Eagles. After two years of inactivity, he had an injury-plagued spell with amateur side Staphorst.

He has represented Armenia at under-19 and under-21 youth international levels.
