= Yeghishe Arakyal Monastery =

Monastery in Azerbaijan

- Եղիշե առաքյալի վանք
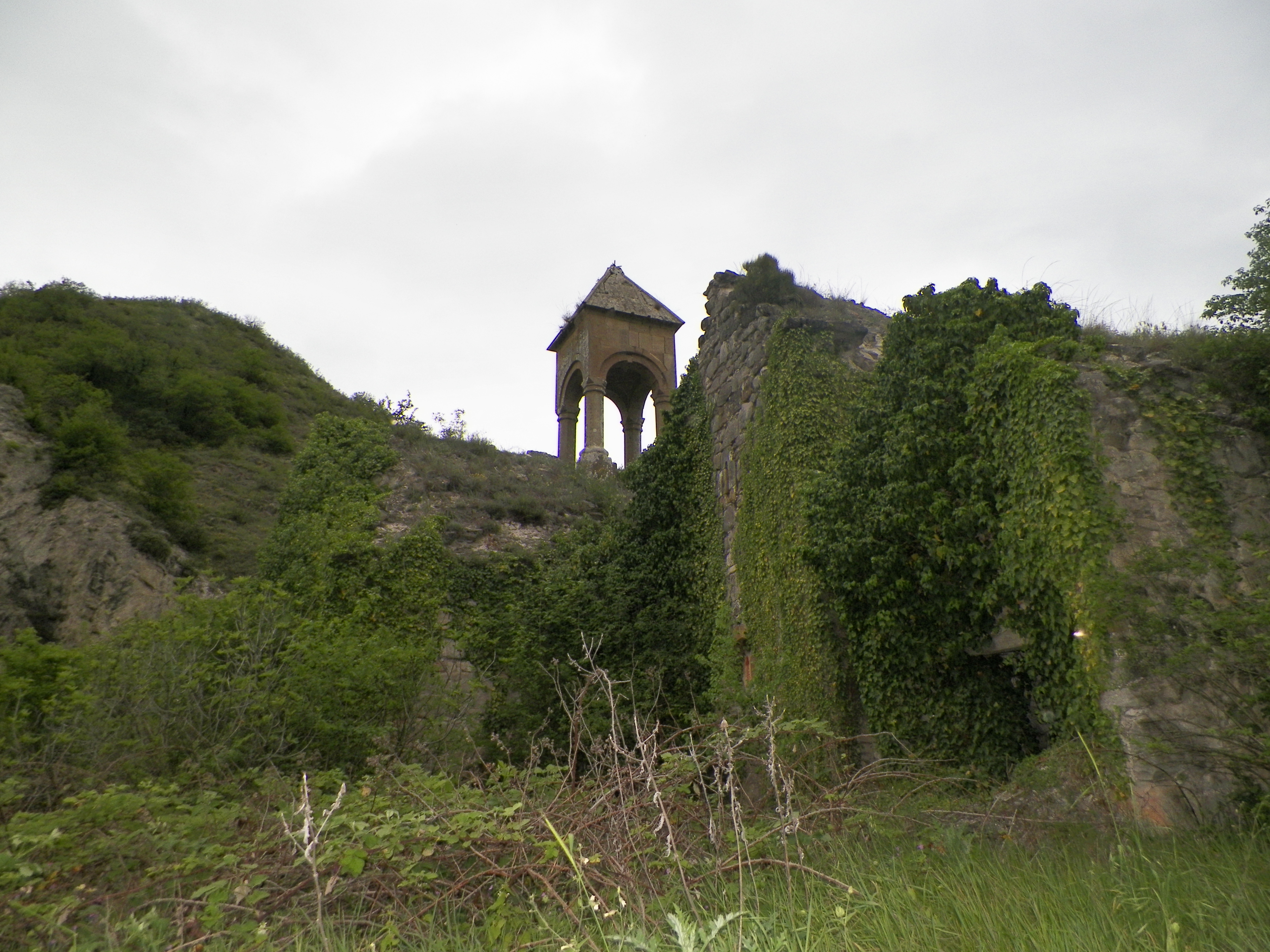
- Remains of Yeghishe Arakyal Monastery

- Location within Azerbaijan

Religion
- Affiliation: Armenian Apostolic Church

Location
- Location: near Madagiz, Nagorno-Karabakh, Azerbaijan
- Coordinates: 40.335775°N 46.693794°E

Architecture
- Groundbreaking: 5th century
- Completed: 13th century

Yeghishe Arakyal Monastery (Armenian: Եղիշե առաքյալի վանք, romanized: Yeghishe Arakyali Vank) or Monastery of Yeghishe the Apostle (Armenian: Եղիշե Առաքյալի վանք) is an Armenian Apostolic Church, in the region of Nagorno-Karabakh, Azerbaijan, located close to the village of Madagiz, on the bank of the Tartar River. The complex comprises the church, seven chapels, a cemetery, and ruins of other buildings.

== History ==
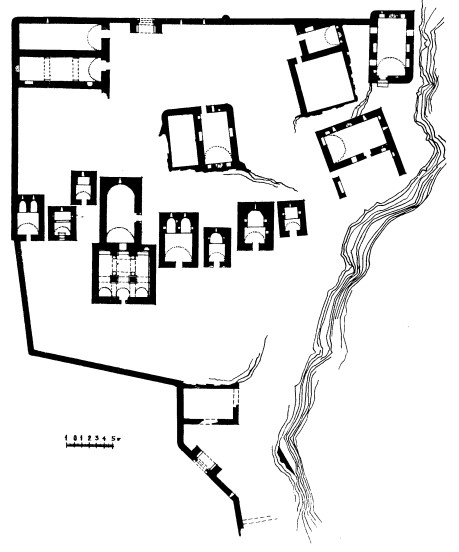
Plan of the monastery complex

Yeghishe Arakyal Monastery was built sometime in the 5th century, although the primary church was built in the 1165. According to the medieval Armenian historian Movses Kaghankatvatsi, the monastery was renamed after the Yeghishe, a disciple of Thaddeus the Apostle, after Yeghishe's relics were moved there. One of the seven chapels surrounding the minster is the tomb of Vachagan III, King of Caucasian Albania, also known as Vachagan the Pious (487–510); another chapel contains the grave of Melik-Atam the Great (Melik-Israelian) of Jraberd. In the Middle Ages, Yeghishe Arakyal Monastery became a highly important center of culture and learning in Artsakh; it produced and held numerous manuscripts and documents.

Throughout the Nagorno-Karabakh conflict, the monastery remained largely untouched due to its inaccessible location. However, the growth of vegetation and natural weathering have weakened the structure over time.

== Gallery ==
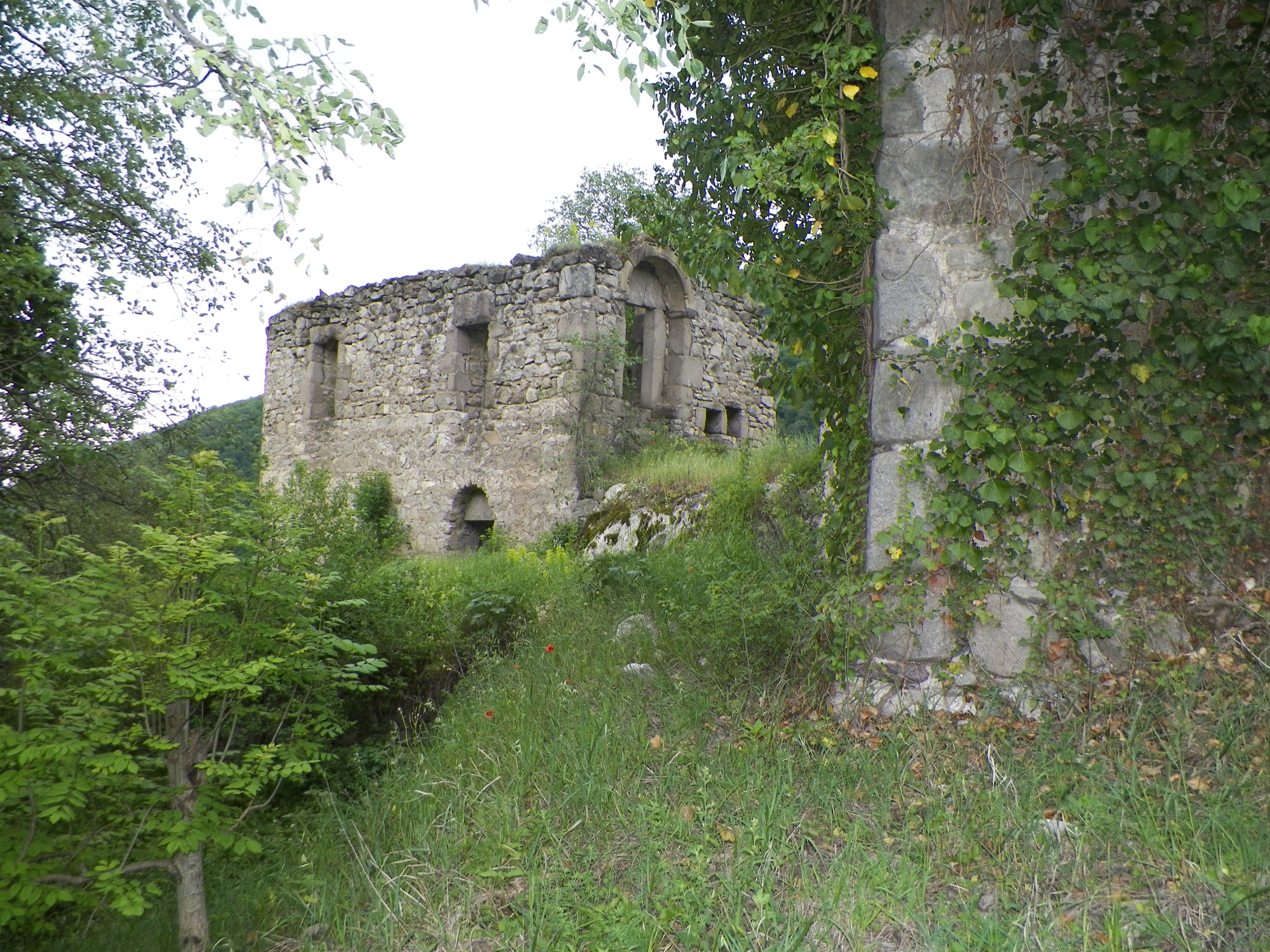
Refectory

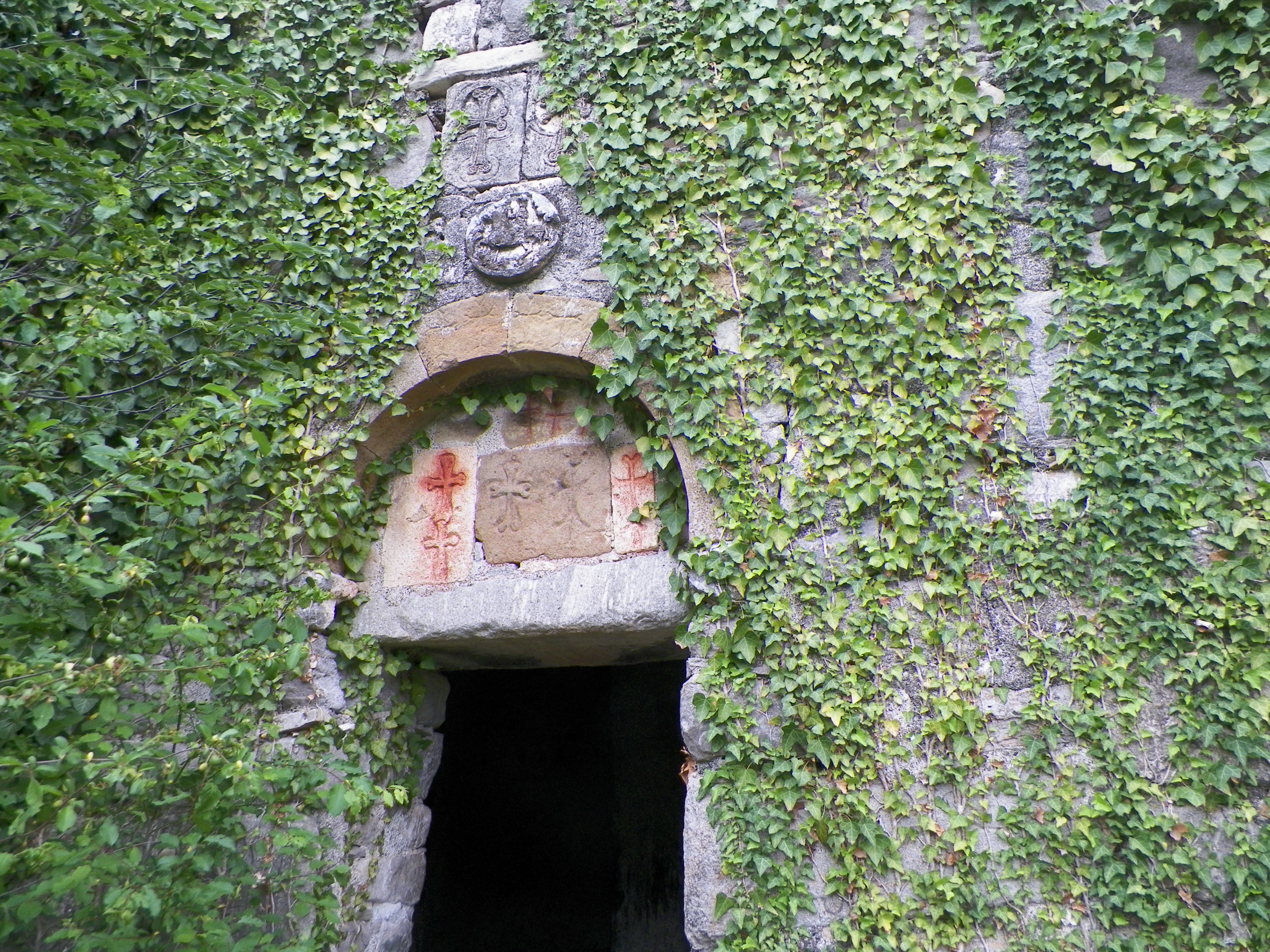
Doorway to the vestibule with tympanum and carvings

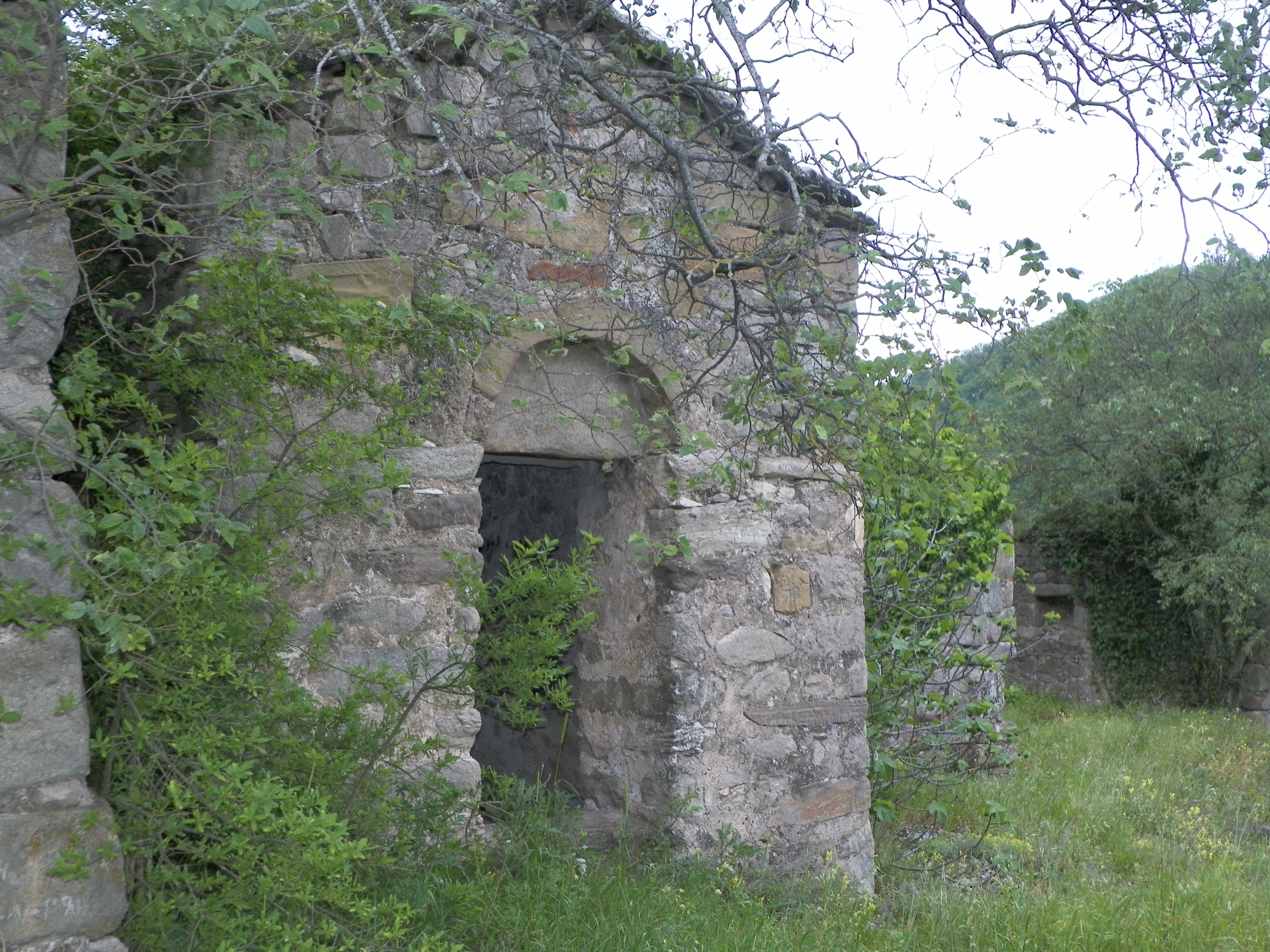
One of the chapels

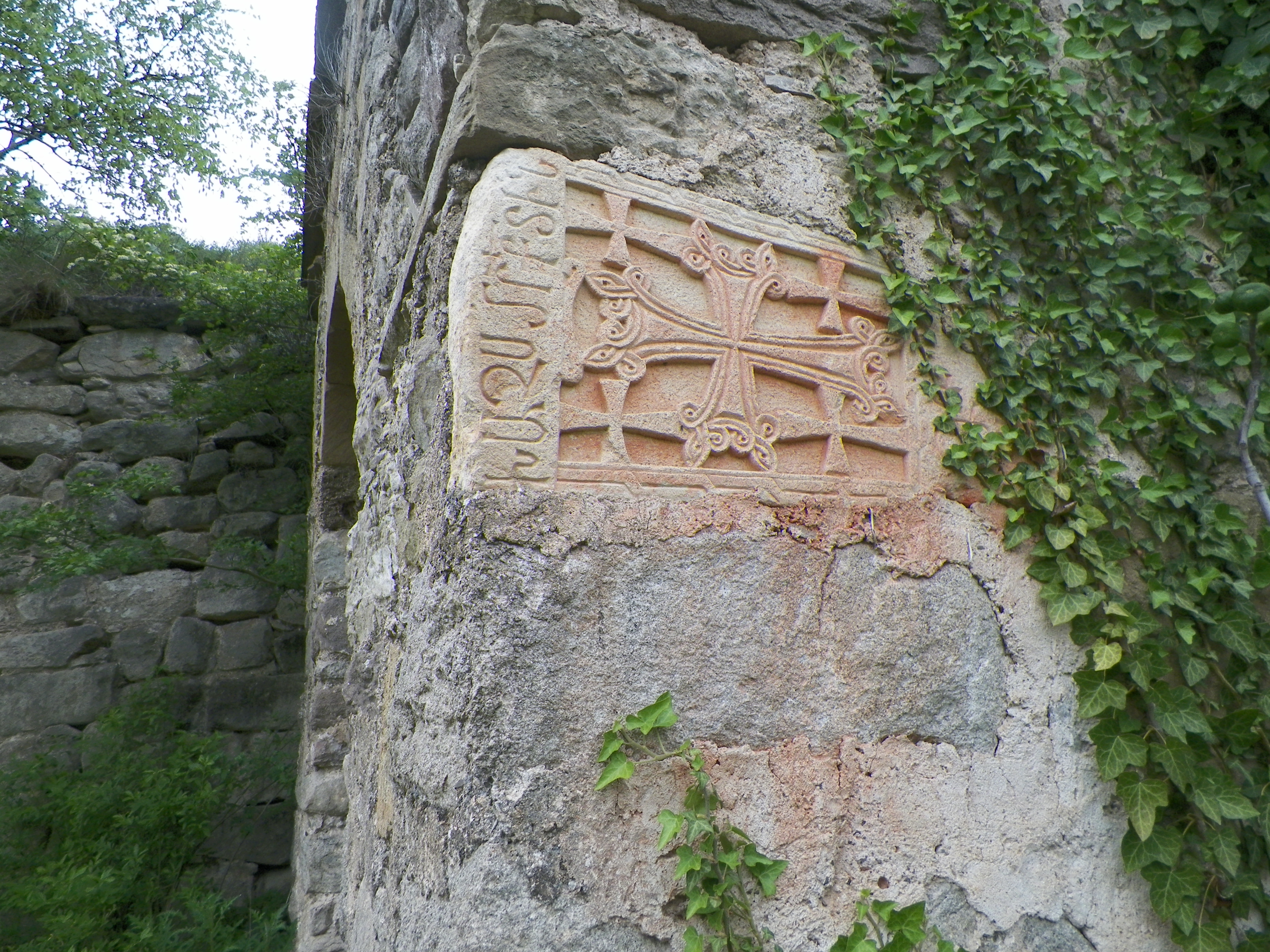
Khachkar

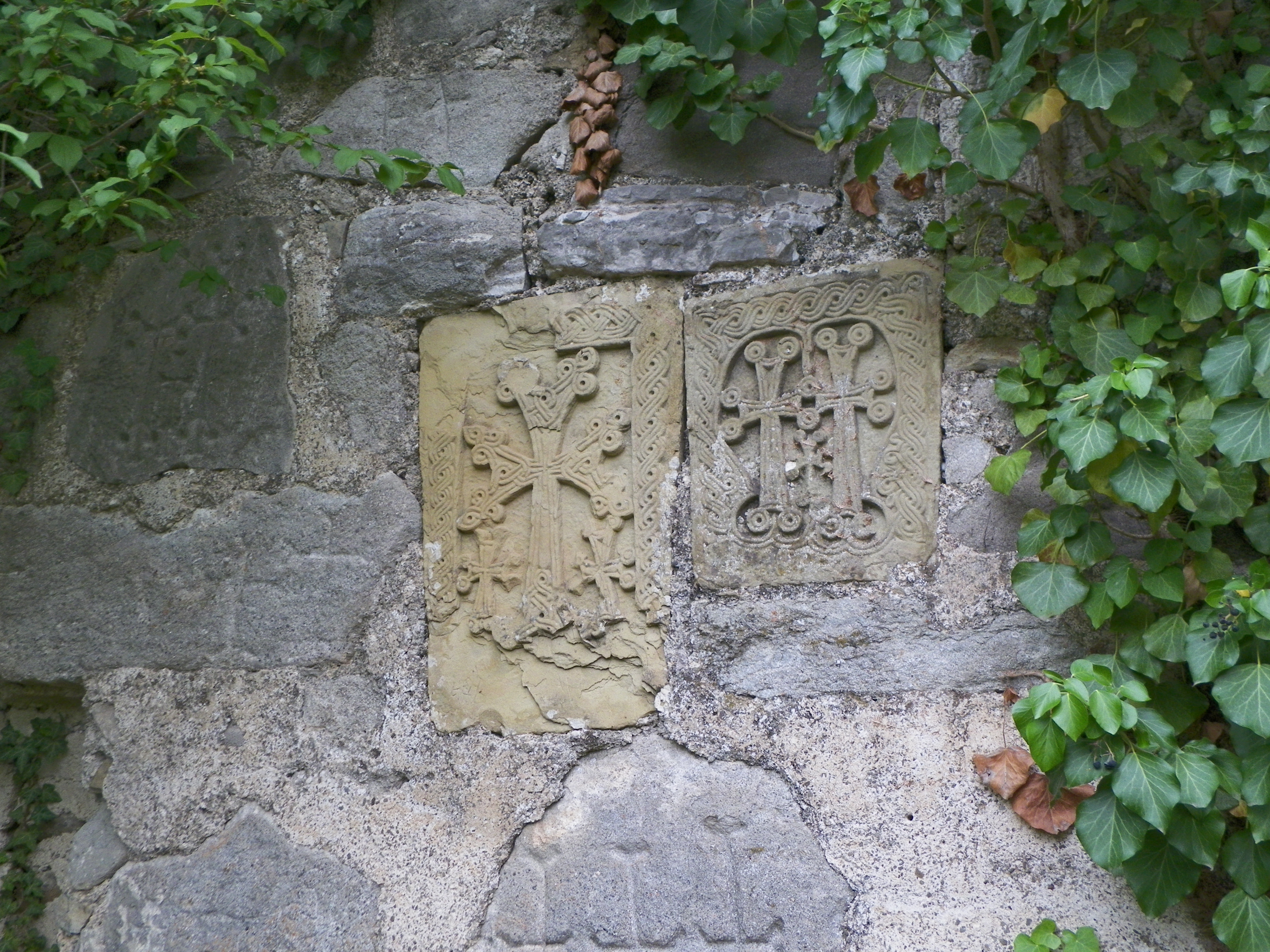
Khachkars

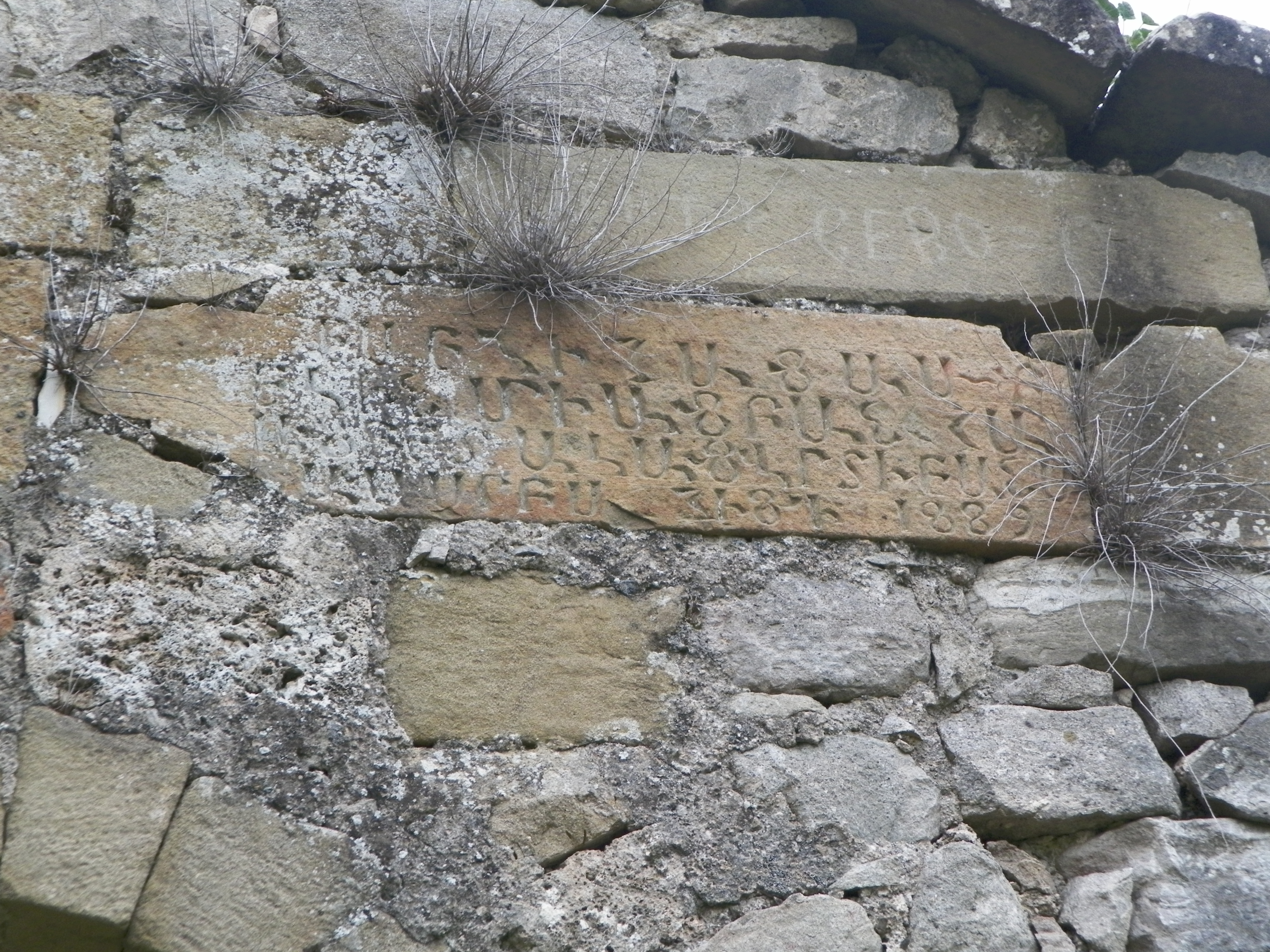
Armenian inscription

== See also ==
- Armenian culture
- Armenian architecture
- Architecture of Azerbaijan
- Culture of Nagorno-Karabakh
- Bridge of Jerveshtik
