= Saint John the Baptist Church, Martakert =

Armenian Apostolic church in Martakert Azerbaijan

Saint John the Baptist Church
- Սուրբ Հովհաննու Կարապետ եկեղեցի
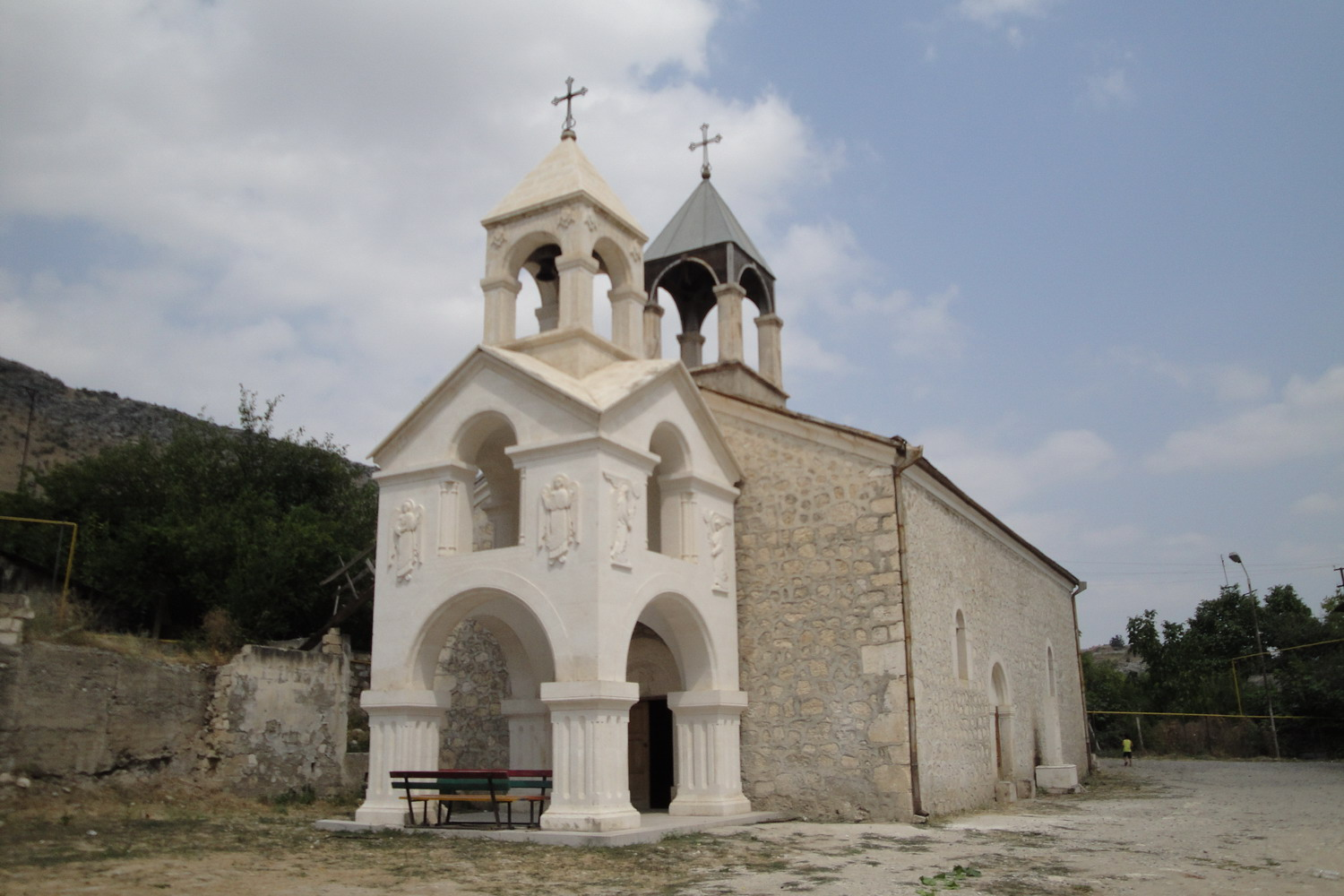
- Saint John the Baptist Church

- Location within Azerbaijan

Religion
- Affiliation: Armenian Apostolic Church
- Rite: Armenian
- Status: Operational

Location
- Location: Martakert, Azerbaijan
- Coordinates: 40°12′45.1″N 46°48′17.8″E

Architecture
- Style: Armenian
- Completed: 1883

Saint John the Baptist Church (Armenian: Սուրբ Հովհաննու Կարապետ եկեղեցի, romanized: Surb Hovhannu Karapet Yekeghets’i), is an Armenian Apostolic church in Martakert, Tartar District, Azerbaijan. The church was built in 1883. There is a cemetery adjacent to the church. The church was renovated in 2003.

== Gallery ==
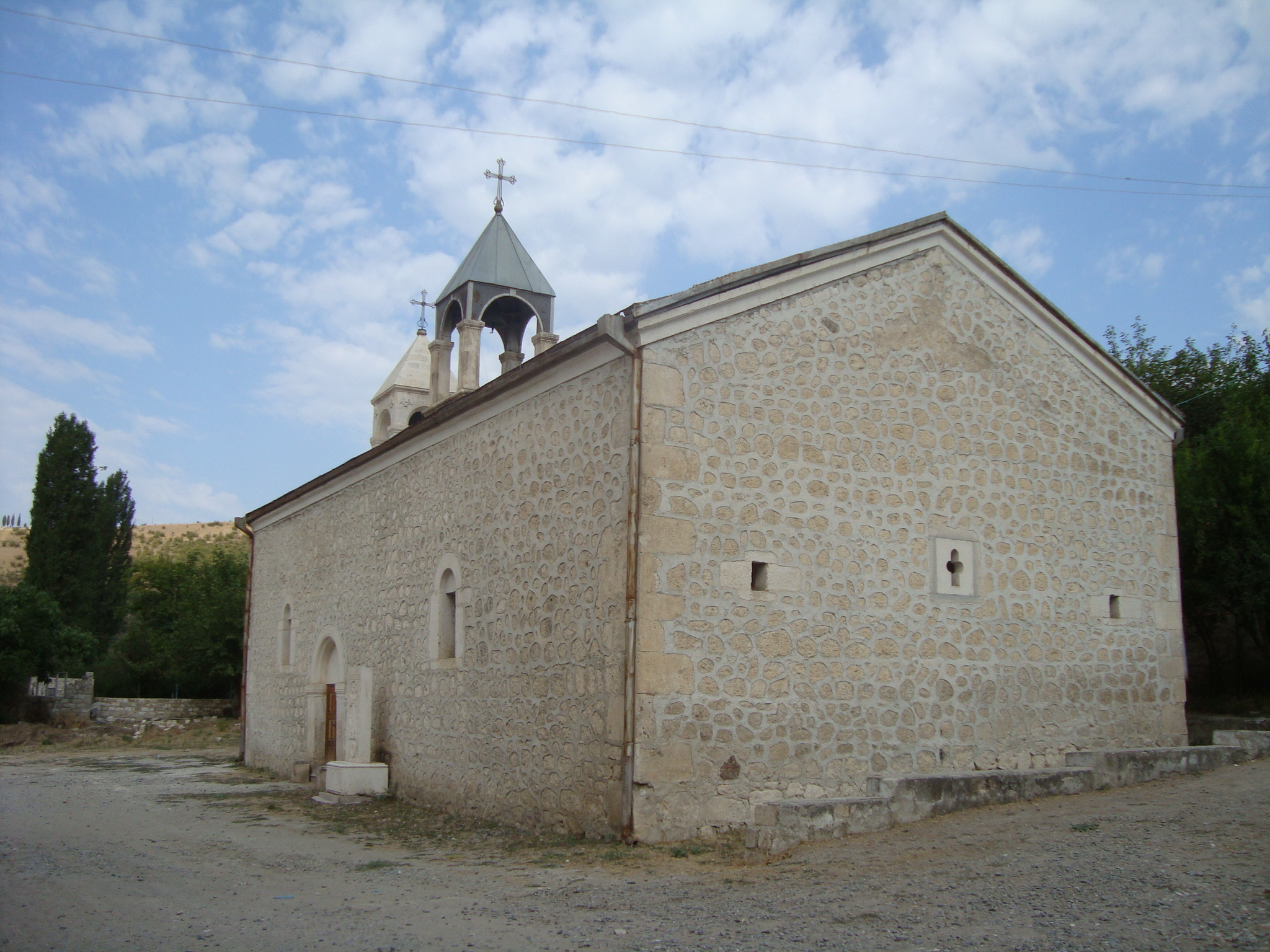

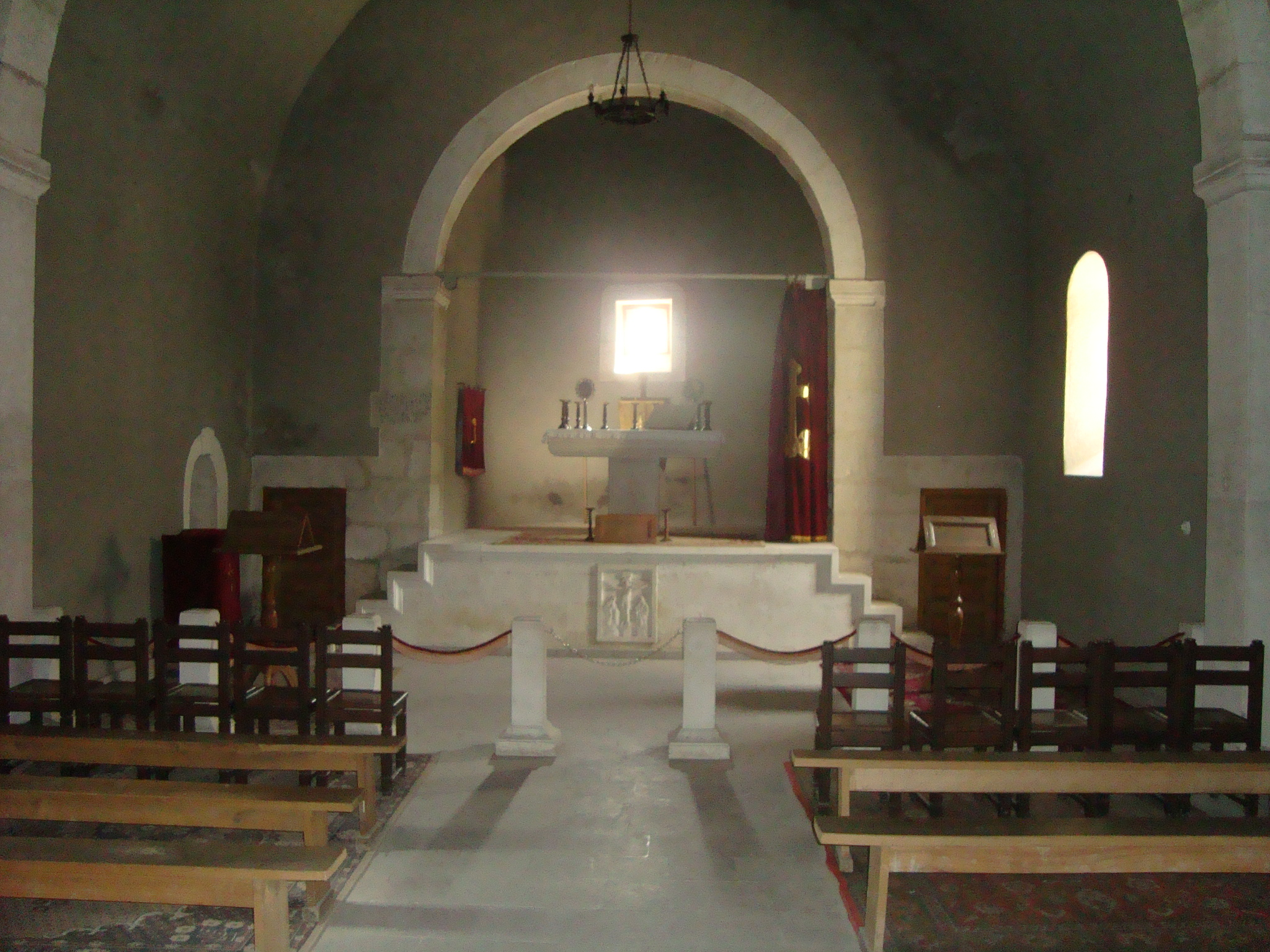

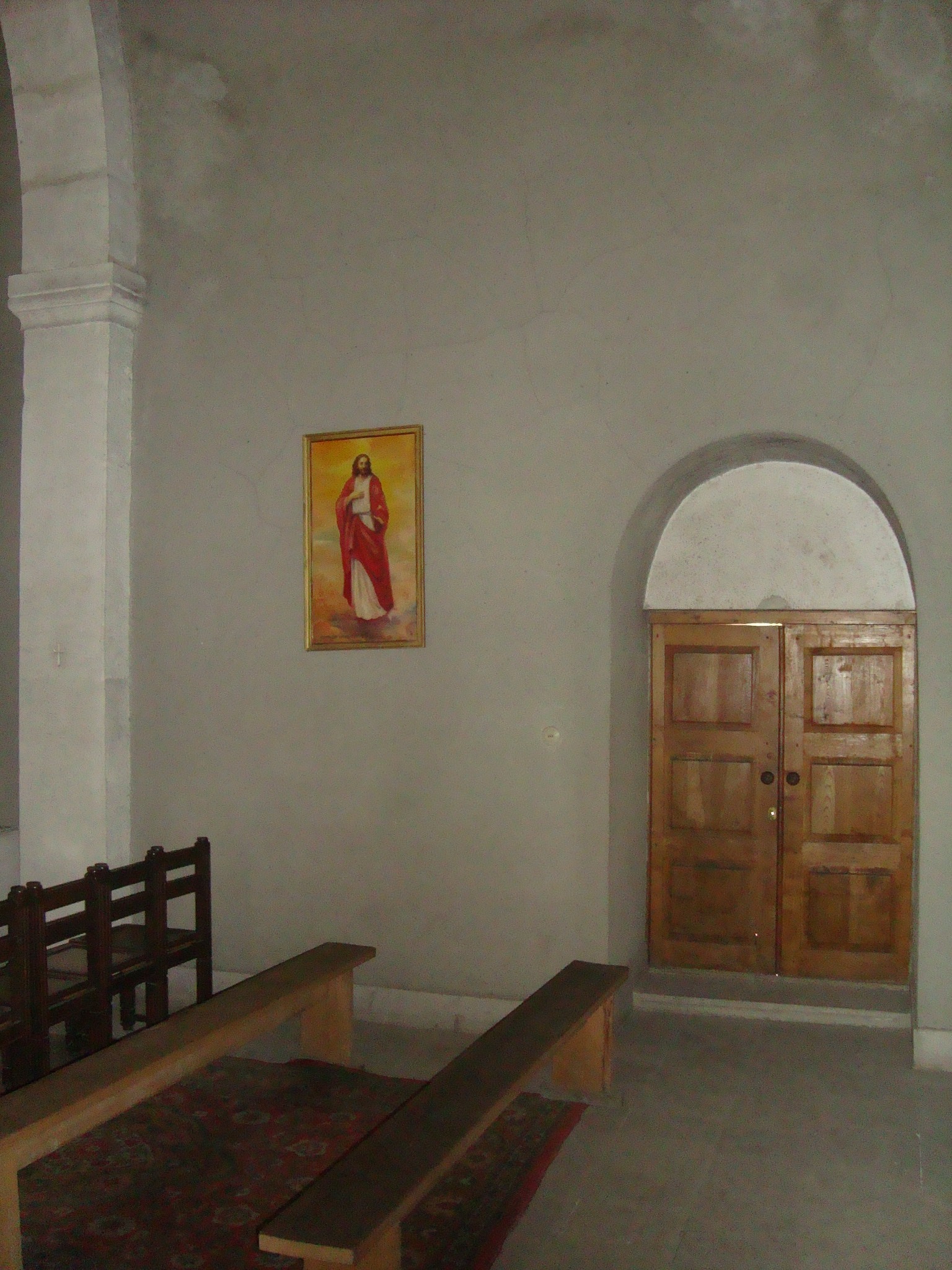

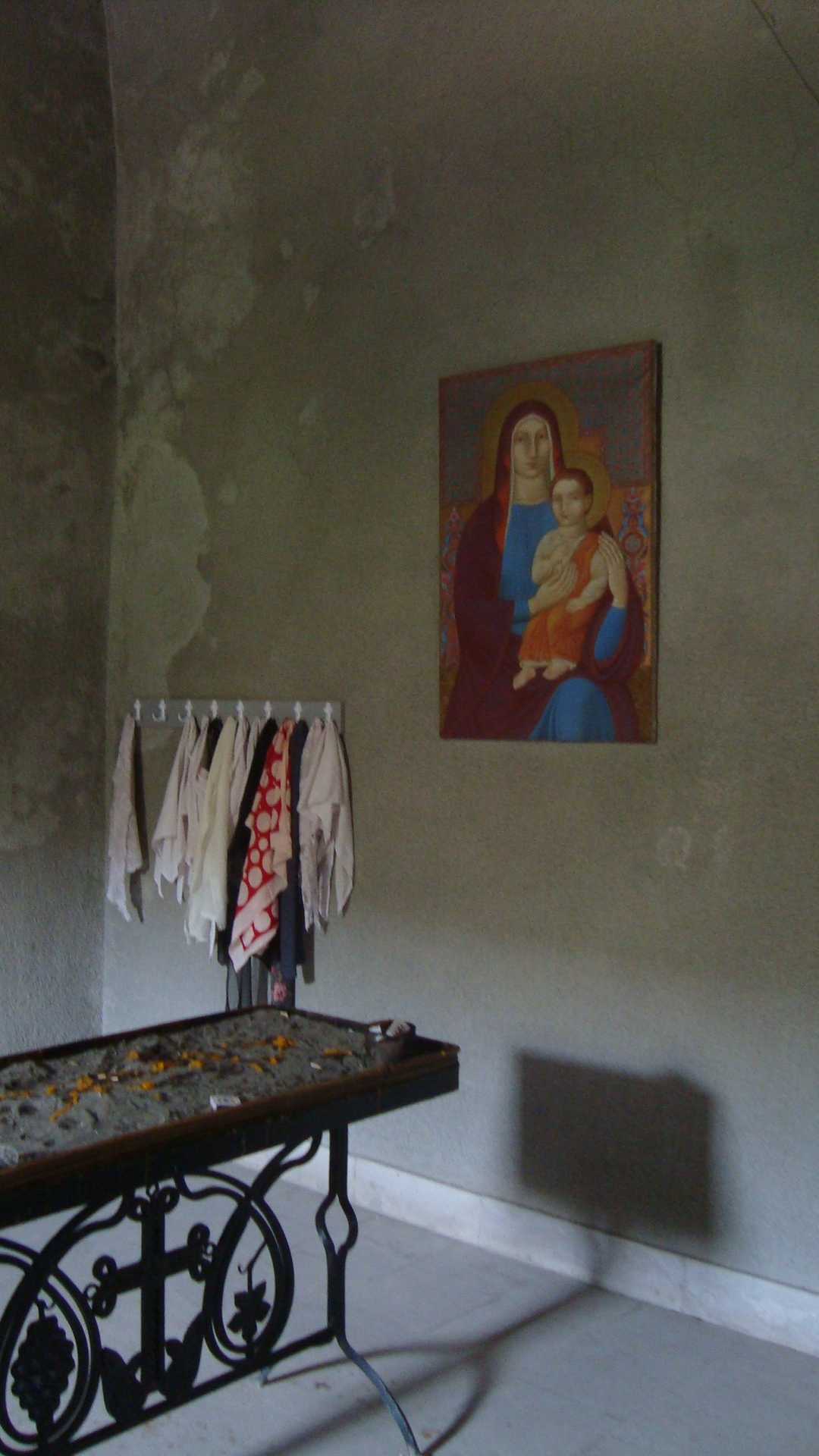

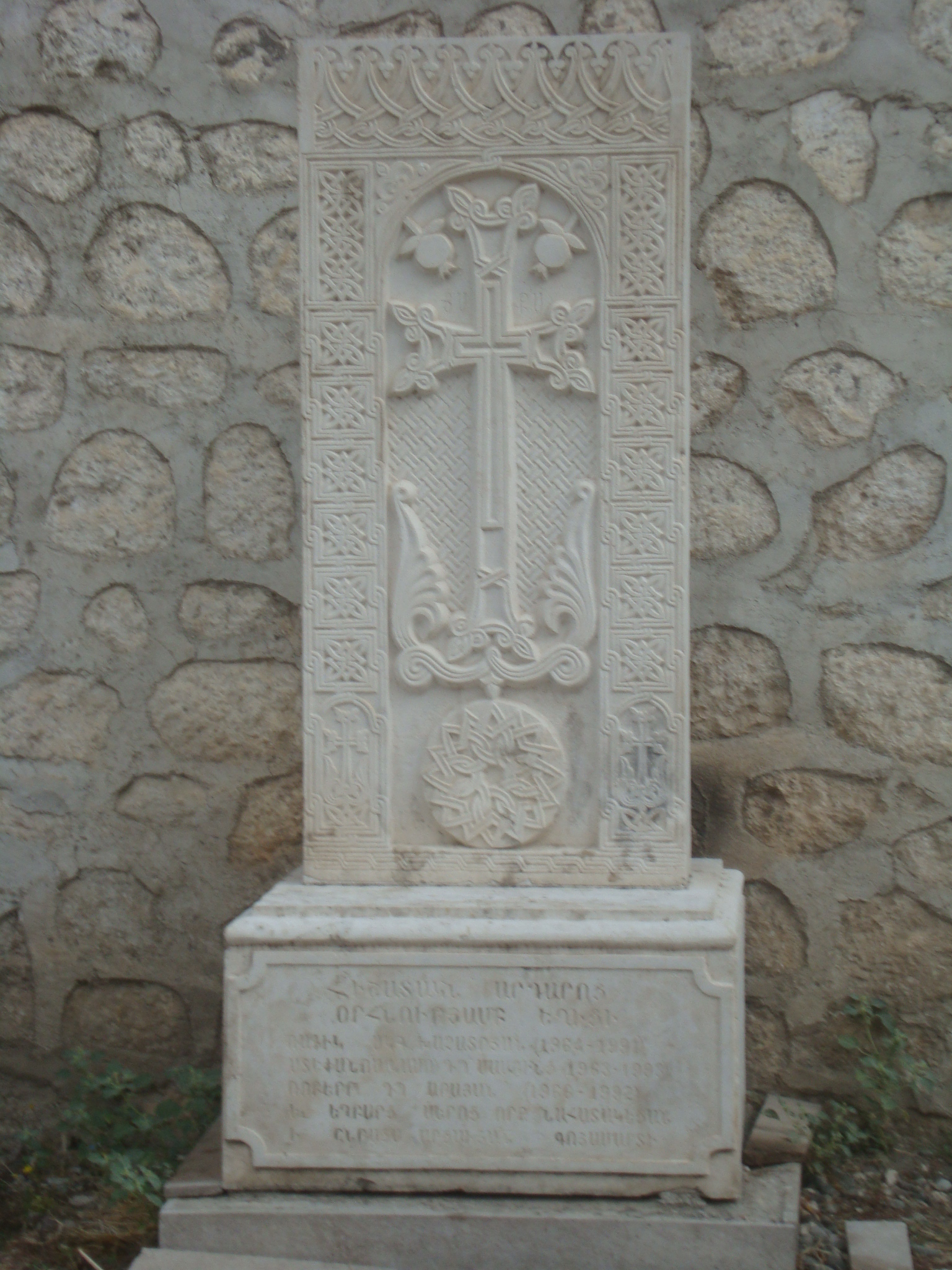
