= Pirəhmədli =

- Location within Azerbaijan Location within Karabakh Economic Region
- Coordinates: 39°28′25″N 47°09′41″E
- Country: Azerbaijan
- District: Fuzuli
- Time zone: UTC+4 (AZT)

Pirəhmədli (also, Beyuk-Pir-Akhmedly, Pirakhmedli, and Pirakhmedly) is a village in the Fuzuli District of Azerbaijan.
