= Mardakert District (NKAO) =

Coordinates: 40°12′55″N 46°48′46″E

- District
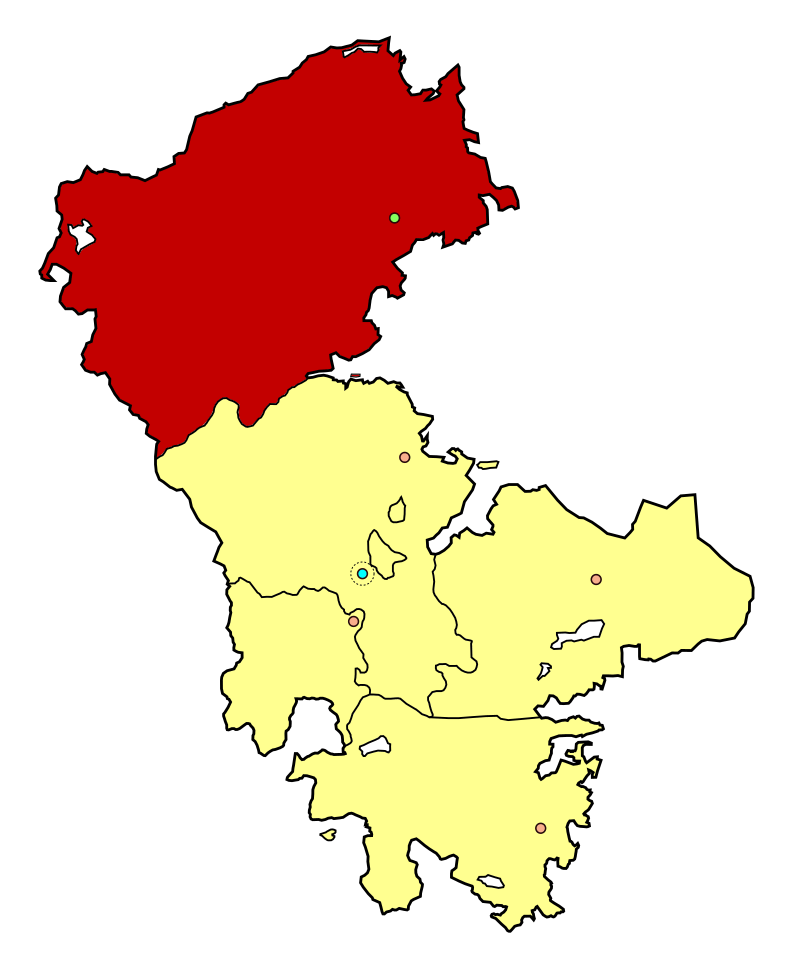
- Map of Mardakert within NKAO
- Autonomous region: (Azerbaijan Soviet Socialist Republic) Nagorno-Karabakh Autonomous Oblast
- Country: USSR
- Established: 8 August 1930
- Abolished: 13 October 1992
- Capital: Mardakert

Population (1979)
  - Total: 44,586

Mardakert District (Russian: Мардакертский район, Azerbaijani: Mardakert rayonu, Мардакерт рајону; Armenian: Մարդակերտի շրջան) was an administrative unit within the former Nagorno-Karabakh Autonomous Oblast (NKAO) of the Azerbaijan Soviet Socialist Republic.

== History ==
The district was formed on 8 August 1930, as the Jrabert district. It was renamed to Mardakert district on 17 September 1939.

The administrative centre of the district was Mardakert. 3 urban-type settlements existed in the region: Madagiz (gained urban status in 1943), Mardakert (since 1960), Leninavan (since 1966). The district was the largest one in NKAO in terms of area and population.

The Nagorno-Karabakh Autonomous Oblast was abolished on 26 November 1991 and the district was renamed Aghdara (Azerbaijani: Ağdərə). On 13 October 1992, the Aghdara district was also abolished and split between the three neighbouring districts, with the western part being incorporated into Kalbajar District, the northeastern part into the Tartar District and the southeastern part into the Ağdam District.

Following the First Nagorno-Karabakh war, most of the former district came under the control of the self-proclaimed Republic of Artsakh and was incorporated into its Martakert Province, while Azerbaijan retained control of part of the eastern part of the district, including the urban settlement of Maragha (later renamed to Shikharkh). During the Madagiz offensive of the 2020 Nagorno-Karabakh war, Azerbaijan recaptured north-eastern part of the former district, including the villages of Talish and Madagiz (later renamed to Sugovushan).

== Demographics ==
Year	Population	Ethnic groups	Source
1926	31,768	92.2% Armenians, 6.0% Azerbaijanis, 1.4% Russians	Soviet Census
1939	40,812	89.3% Armenians, 6.9% Azerbaijanis, 3.0% Russians	Soviet Census
1959	37,734	88.9% Armenians, 9.1% Azerbaijanis, 1.6% Russians	Soviet Census
1970	44,004	86.9% Armenians, 11.7% Azerbaijanis, 0.8% Russians	Soviet Census
1979	44,586	83.1% Armenians, 15.8% Azerbaijanis, 0.8% Russians	Soviet Census
