= Madagiz =

Madagiz Մատաղիս • Mataghis
- Suqovuşan
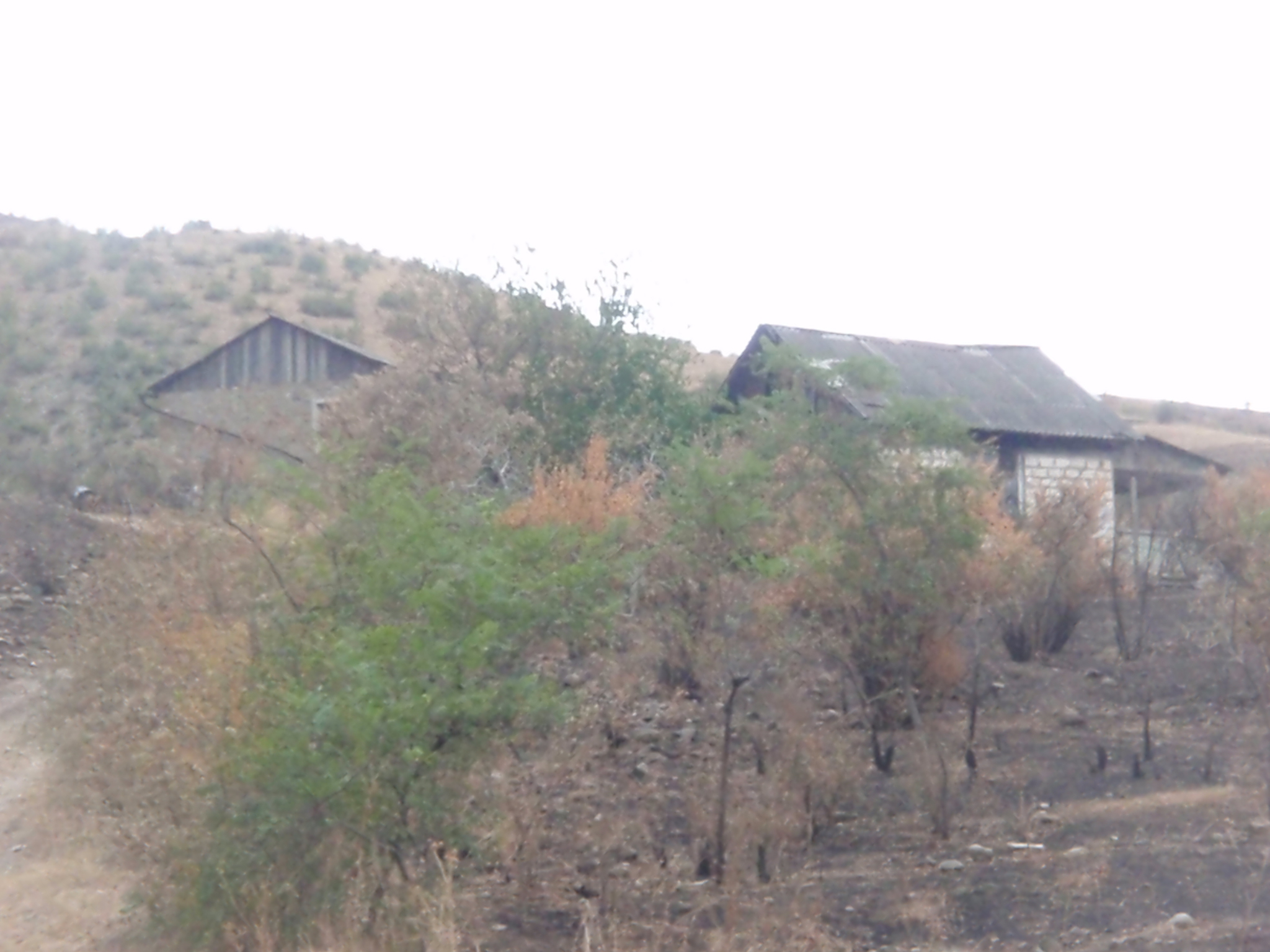
- Residential houses in the village, 2011

- Location within Azerbaijan
- Coordinates: 40°19′33.1″N 46°45′00.8″E
- Country: Azerbaijan
- District: Aghdara
- Elevation: 434 m (1,424 ft)

Population (2015)
  - Total: 665
- Time zone: UTC+4 (AZT)

Madagiz (Armenian: Մատաղիս, romanized: Mataghis) or Sugovushan (Azerbaijani: Suqovuşan, (Note: From 3 October 2020.)), is a village in the Aghdara District of Azerbaijan, in the region of Nagorno-Karabakh. The village had an ethnic Armenian-majority population prior to the 2020 Nagorno-Karabakh war. Madagiz was part of the Martakert Province of the breakaway Republic of Artsakh between 10 April 1994 and 3 October 2020.

== History ==
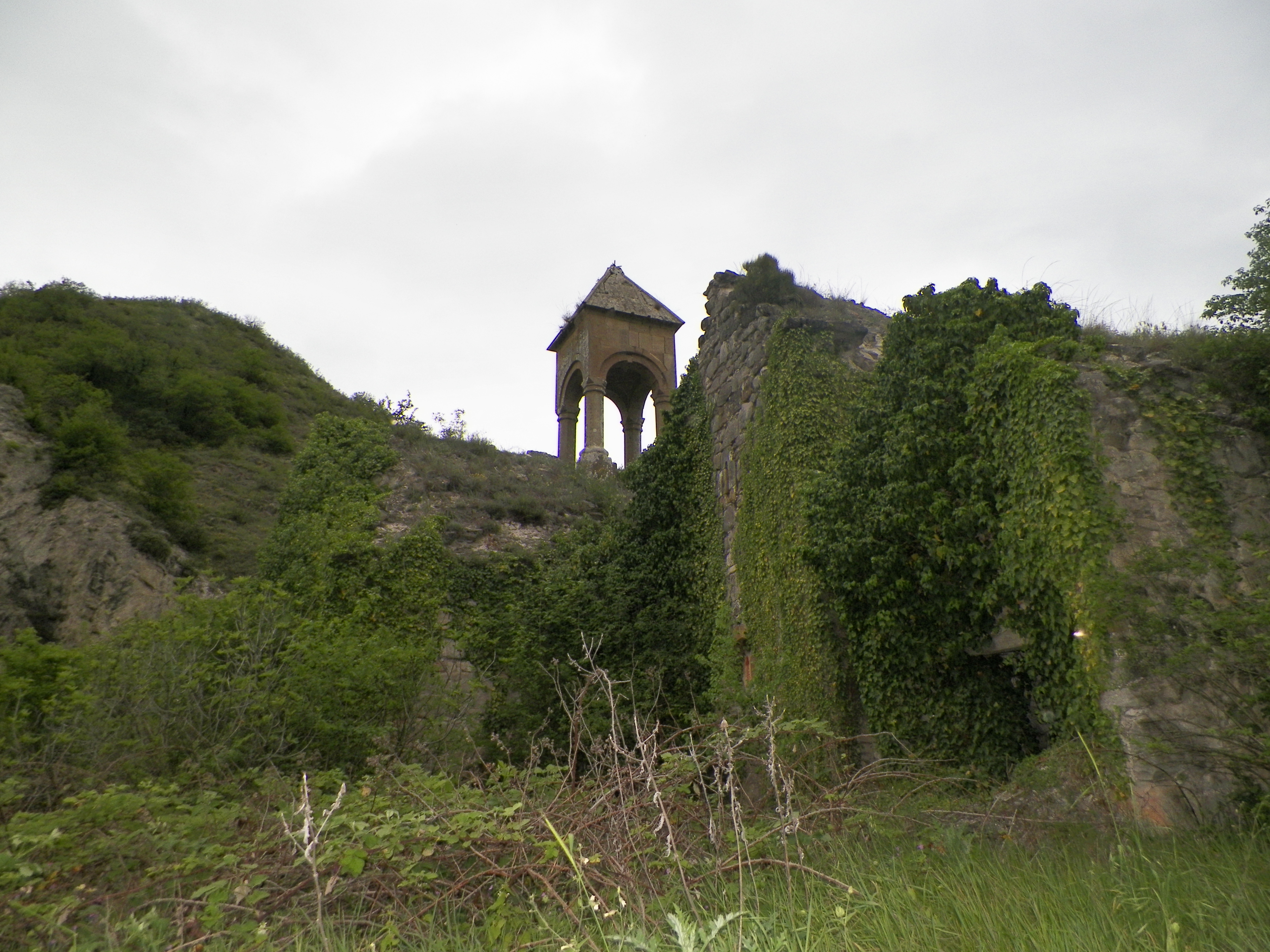
Yeghishe Arakyal Monastery near the village, 13th century

In 1943, during the Soviet period, Madagiz was given the status of an urban-type settlement within the Mardakert District of the Nagorno-Karabakh Autonomous Oblast. In 1949, Madagiz was home to an industrial complex, including a furniture factory and a lime production workshop. In 1953, a secondary school was opened. The Madagiz hydroelectric power station was built nearby on the banks of the Tartar River.

During the First Nagorno-Karabakh War, Azerbaijani forces launched an offensive into the Mardakert District in the summer of 1992, capturing most of the district. However, as the result of a counter-offensive, by the end of June 1993, Armenian forces managed to take control of almost the entire district. After the war, the village was administrated as part of the Martakert Province of the Republic of Artsakh.

In April 2016, during the Four-Day War, the village found itself in the area of direct hostilities. On 27 September 2020 the 2nd Nagorno Karabakh War broke out, with the Azerbaijani Armed Forces launching an offensive on the village and the surrounding areas. It was captured by Azerbaijan on 3 October 2020, and subsequently the Azerbaijani government renamed the village to Suqovuşan.

== Historical heritage sites ==
Historical heritage sites in and around the village include tombs from the 2nd-1st millennia BCE, a 12th/13th-century khachkar, the Yeghishe Arakyal Monastery from between the 13th and 18th centuries with an adjacent chapel-mausoleum built in 1286 dedicated to Vachagan III (Armenian: Վաչագան Բարեպաշտի մատուռ-դամբարան, romanized: Vachagan Barepashti Matur-Dambaran), a two-storey building from 1552, the St. Yeghishe Church (Armenian: Սուրբ Եղիշե եկեղեցի, romanized: Surb Yeghishe Yekeghetsi) from 1892-1898, and an 18th/19th-century cemetery.

== Geography ==
The village is located 30 kilometers northwest of the left bank of the river Tartar. To the west of the village lies a reservoir, which was created to supply water to the Tartar, Goranboy, and Yevlakh Districts of Azerbaijan.

== Economy and culture ==
In 2015, the population was mainly engaged in agriculture and animal husbandry, and the village had a municipal building, a secondary school, a kindergarten, and a medical centre.

=== Sugovushan-1 and -2 ===
The reconstructed hydroelectrical power plants Sugovushan-1 and Sugovushan-2 have the total capacity of 7.8 MW.

== Demographics ==
In 1970, 271 people (236 Armenians, 30 Azerbaijanis, 44 Russians and nine Ukrainians) lived in the village. Madagiz also had an Armenian majority-population in 1989.

The village had 404 inhabitants in 2005, and 665 inhabitants in 2015.

According to the State Committee for Refugees and Internally Displaced Persons of Azerbaijan, as of 2020, 66 internally displaced persons from Madagiz were living in Azerbaijan.

== Gallery ==
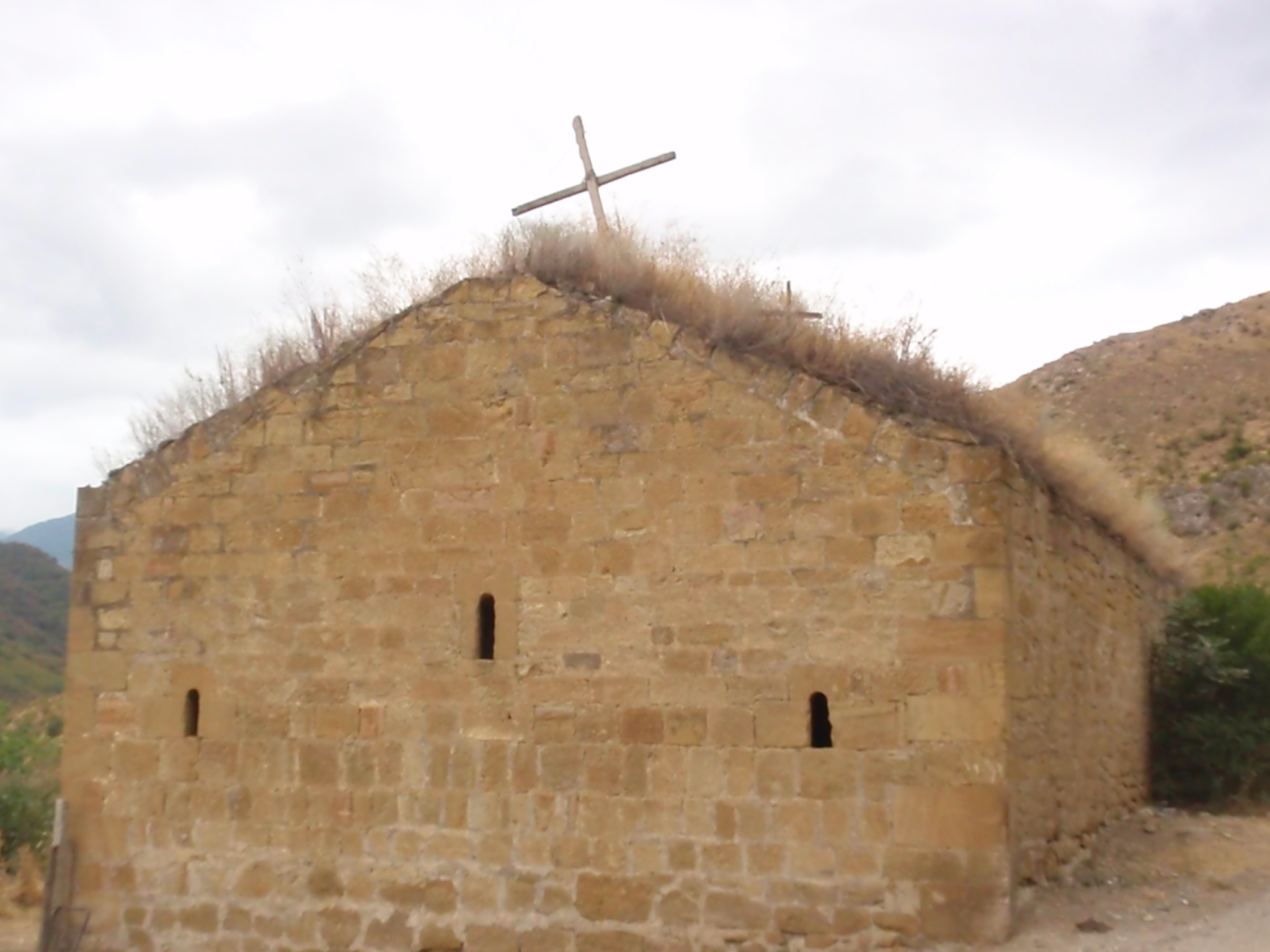
Church of St. Yeghishe in the northwestern part of the village

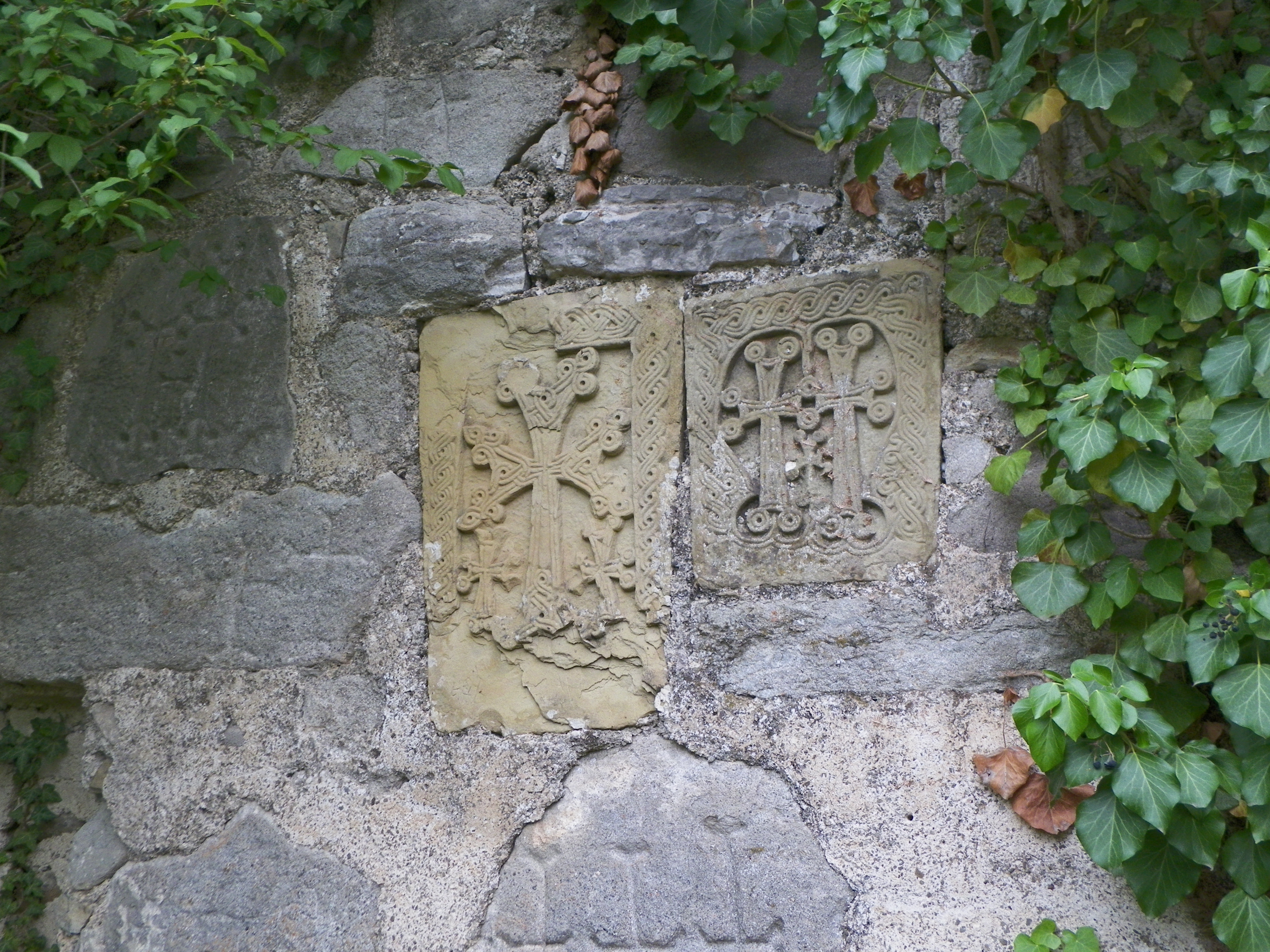
Armenian khachkars in the wall in the monastery of St. Yeghishe

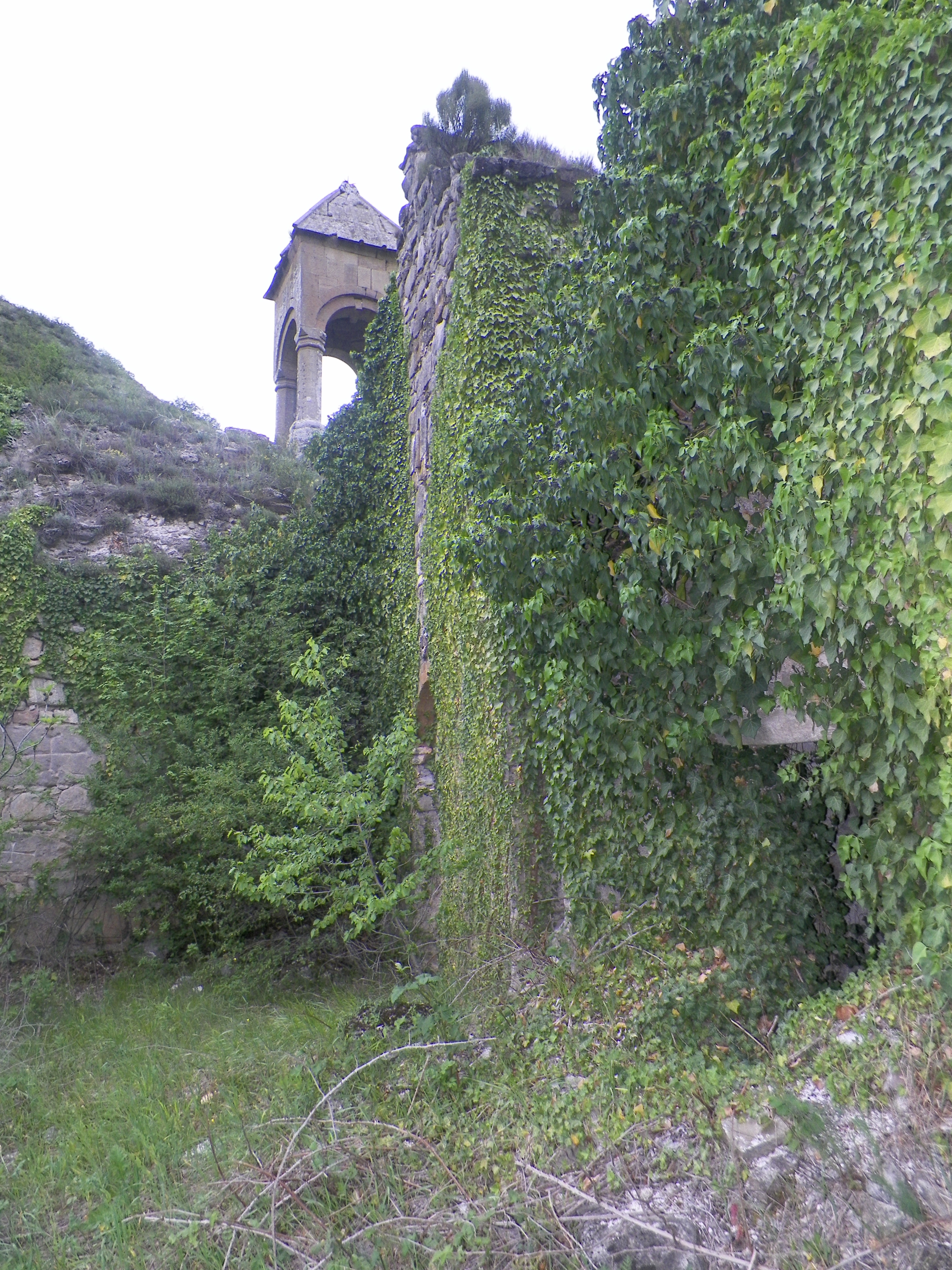
Countryard of the monastery of St. Yeghishe

== See also ==
- List of power stations in Azerbaijan
