= Aghdara District =

District in western Azerbaijan

- District
- Map of Azerbaijan showing Aghdara District
- Coordinates: 9°28′4.6618″N 1°19′15.2177″E
- Country: Azerbaijan
- Region: Karabakh
- Established: 5 December 2023
- Capital: Aghdara

Government
  - Governor: Elchin Yusubov

Area
  - Total: 1,660.83 km^{2} (641.25 sq mi)

Population (2024)
  - Total: 12,100
  - Density: 7.29/km^{2} (18.9/sq mi)
- Time zone: UTC+4 (AZT)

Aghdara District (Azerbaijani: Ağdərə rayonu) is one of the 67 districts of Azerbaijan. It is located in the west of the country in the Karabakh Economic Region. The district borders the districts of Goranboy, Tartar, Aghdam, Khojaly and Kalbajar. Its capital and largest city is Aghdara. As of 2024, the district had a nominal population of 12,100.

The district was officially abolished in 1992 and was only reestablished in 2023.

== History ==
The district was first established under the name Jraberd District on 8 August 1930, as part of the Nagorno-Karabakh Autonomous Oblast in Soviet Azerbaijan. It was renamed Mardakert District on 17 September 1939 and retained this name throughout the Soviet period. On 26 November 1991, shortly after Azerbaijani declaration of independence, the district was renamed to Aghdara District, its current name. However, it was soon completely abolished on 13 October 1992, and its territory was partitioned between three neighbouring districts.

Most of the territory of Aghdara District came under the control of the Armenian forces during the First Nagorno-Karabakh War and was made part of the Martakert Province of the self-proclaimed Republic of Artsakh. The district was eventually officially reestablished by Azerbaijan on 5 December 2023, following the 2023 Azerbaijani offensive in Nagorno-Karabakh, which saw the region return under Azerbaijani control.

== See also ==
- Mardakert District
