= Demographics of the Republic of Artsakh =

Demographic features of the population of Artsakh include population density, ethnicity, education level, health of the populace, economic status, religious affiliations, and other aspects.

In the census of 2015, the population of Artsakh had a population of 145,053, consisting of 144,683 Armenians and 238 Russians, and others. Following the 2023 Azerbaijani offensive and the subsequent expulsion of Nagorno-Karabakh Armenians, a UN mission estimated that only 50 to 1000 Armenians remained in the region.

Most of the Armenian population is Christian and belongs to the Armenian Apostolic Church. Certain Orthodox Christian and Evangelical Christian denominations also exist; other religions include Judaism.

== Historical overview of Artsakh's demographics ==
=== 18th century ===
Concrete numbers about the demographic situation in Artsakh appear since the 18th century. Archimandrite Minas Tigranian, after completing his secret mission to Persian Armenia ordered by the Russian Tsar Peter the Great stated in a report dated March 14, 1717, that the patriarch of the Gandzasar Monastery, in Artsakh, had under his authority 900 Armenian villages.

In his letter of 1769 to Russia's Count P. Panin, the Georgian king Erekle II, in his description of Artsakh wrote :

Seven families rule the region of Khamse. Its population is totally Armenian.

— Erekle II

When discussing Karabakh and Shushi in the 18th century, the Russian diplomat and historian S. M. Bronevskiy (Russian: С. М. Броневский) indicated in his Historical Notes that Karabakh, which he said "is located in Greater Armenia", had as many as 30,000–40,000 armed Armenian men in 1796.

Ottoman land surveys in 1593 and 1727 recorded several Turkic/Azerbaijani nomadic tribes in the historical Highland Karabakh (Khachen, Dizak, Varanda, Gülüstan) and dozens in Lowland Karabakh. Russian ethnologist Anatoly N. Yamskov points out that the latter tribes practiced summer migrations from the pastures of the Karabakh lowlands to the pastures of the mountainous part of Karabakh and stayed there during the summer season. This tradition lasted from the very beginning of penetration of nomadic herdsmen in the region till the beginning of the 20th century. Additionally, several sedentary Muslim villages were listed in the 1727 Ottoman census in the historical Nagorno-Karabakh, such as Qarğabazar in Dizak (currently in Fuzuli District). (Note: NKAO is Armenian-dominated part of historical Mountainous Karabakh. and many Azeri villages of this region were administratively excluded from the former)

=== 19th–early 20th centuries ===
A survey prepared by the Russian imperial authorities in 1823, several years before the 1828 Armenian migration from Persia to the newly established Armenian Province, shows that all Armenians of Karabakh compactly resided in its highland portion, i.e. on the territory of the five traditional Armenian principalities in Artsakh, and constituted an absolute demographic majority on those lands (NKAO). The survey's more than 260 pages recorded not the exact population, but the number of villages, as such:

District	Armenian		Tatar ^{1}		Total
District	Villages	%	Villages	%	Total
Khachen	12	100%	0	0%	12
Jraberd	8	100%	0	0%	8
Dizak	14	93.3%	1	6.7%	15
Gulistan	12	70.6%	5	29.4%	17
Varanda	23	95.8%	1	4.2%	24
Total	69	90.8%	7	9.2%	76
^{1} Tatar is the Russian word for Turkic people., referring in this case to modern-day Azerbaijanis

However, Russian and subsequently Soviet censuses and surveys were conducted during the winter and thus considered only the sedentary, predominantly Armenian population, and not the Azeri nomadic population, which stayed in the lowlands during the cold months of year. According to A. N. Yamskov, during the summer months, the demographics of the mountainous part of Karabakh changed drastically, as in the late 1890s, almost 97% of the tens of thousands of Azeris in the lowlands moved to one of the several mountainous pastures, predominantly in Nagorno-Karabakh.

In 1918, the population of Mountainous Karabakh consisted of 165 thousand Armenians (71.4%), 59 thousand Muslims (25.5%), of whom 20 thousand resided in the city of Shushi, main city of Karabakh, and 7 thousand Russians (3.1%). Nagorno-Karabakh Autonomous Oblast, which was established in 1923, did not correspond to the borders of Mountainous Karabakh, as one of its historical districts Gulistan was excluded, and in the rest only Armenian-dominated parts were included, thus leaving as many as possible Azeri villages of Mountainous Karabakh out of autonomous oblast.

According to 1926 All-Union census of Soviet Union, 125,159 people inhabited NKAO, of whom 111,694 (89%) were Armenians and 12,592 (10%) were Azeris, indicated as Turks.

=== Soviet era and aftermath of Karabakh War ===
During the Soviet times, the leaders of the Azerbaijan SSR tried to change the demographic balance of the Nagorno Karabakh Autonomous Region by increasing the number of Azeri residents through opening a university with Azeri, Russian and Armenian sectors and a shoe factory, sending Azerbaijanis from other parts of Azerbaijan SSR to the NKAO. Heydar Aliyev said in an interview in 2002, "By doing this, I tried to increase the number of Azeris and to reduce the number of Armenians." However, A. N. Yamskov argues that these were Azeris familiar with Nagorno-Karabakh, including the descendants of Azeri nomads that were forced to stop nomadic migrations in 1930s.

=== Population displacement and expulsion ===
Nearing the collapse of the Soviet Union in 1989, the Nagorno-Karabakh Autonomous Oblast boasted a population of 145,593 Armenians (76.4%), 42,871 Azeris (22.4%), and several thousand Kurds, Russians, Greeks, and Assyrians. The entire Azeri and Kurdish population were expelled from the region following the heaviest years of fighting in the First Nagorno-Karabakh War, from 1992 to 1993.

According to an Azerbaijani state report from 2014, 597,429 Azerbaijanis were registered as internally displaced persons, the vast majority of which are ethnic Azerbaijanis, as well as some Kurds, Russians, and others. The figure includes 230,000 children born to IDPs, around 54,000 IDPs who had been able to return to their homes, and non-displaced persons at risk of becoming IDPs due to living in proximity to the conflict. The figure does not include those displaced due to natural disasters. The vast majority were displaced from the occupied territories surrounding Nagorno-Karabakh, rather than the enclave itself. The inclusion of children of IDPs, former IDPs, and exclusion of persons displaced due to natural disasters is not in line with the Guiding Principles on Internal Displacement set forth by the Internal Displacement Monitoring Centre, nor Azerbaijan's 1999 law on internal displacement, and the IDMC attributes an "artificial inflation of the overall number" to this.

Conversely, in 2001, 280,000 persons — virtually all ethnic Armenians who fled Azerbaijan during the 1988–1993 war were living in refugee-like circumstances in Armenia. Most of these displaced Armenians came from Azerbaijan proper; only 30,000 of them came from Nagorno-Karabakh.

=== Languages ===
The main language spoken in Artsakh is Armenian; however, Karabakh Armenians speak a dialect of Armenian which is considerably different from that which is spoken in Armenia as it is layered with Russian, Turkish and Persian words. Most of the older generation also speaks Azerbaijani.

The official languages of the Republic of Artsakh were Armenian and, since 2021, Russian. Ethnic Armenians made up roughly 95% of the population. There were also minority groups of Russians, Assyrians, Kurds, Jews and Greeks. Prior to the First Nagorno-Karabakh War the former ethnic Azeri population was much higher, with many people being displaced from the area during and after the war thus reducing the percentage of Azeri language speakers in Artsakh.

=== 2000s ===
Until 2000, the country's net migration was at a negative.

In 2001, the Artsakh's reported population was 95% Armenian, with the remaining total including Assyrians, Greeks, and Kurds.

For the first half of 2007, 1,010 births and 659 deaths were reported, with a net emigration of 27.

In March 2007, the local government announced that its population had grown to 138,000. The annual birth rate was recorded at 2,200–2,300 per year, an increase from nearly 1,500 in 1999.

In 2011, officials from YAP submitted a letter to OSCE which stated, "The OSCE fact-finding mission report released last year also found that some 15,000 Armenians have been illegally settled on Azerbaijan's occupied territories."

However, the OSCE report, released in March 2011, estimates the population of territories controlled by ethnic Armenians "adjacent to the breakaway Azerbaijani region of Nagorno-Karabakh [Artsakh]" to be 14,000, and states "there has been no significant growth in the population since 2005."

Most of the Armenian population is Christian and belongs to the Armenian Apostolic Church. Certain Orthodox Christian and Evangelical Christian denominations also exist; other religions include Judaism.

With the turmoil caused by the Syrian Civil War, several hundred Syrian-Armenian citizens have moved from Syria to the Republic of Artsakh. Many of these refugees are being offered assistance by the government in the form of land, housing, extra educational assistance, and other such basics that will help them quickly assimilate and start their new lives.

== Overall dynamic of ethnic groups in the 20th and 21st centuries ==
5 districts of Azerbaijan (Kalbajar, Lachin, Gubadly, Zangilan, Jabrail) are fully occupied by the Republic of Artsakh. Artsakh also occupied 2 other districts (Fuzuli and Aghdam) partially. The population of the total 7 districts of Azerbaijan not belonging to the Nagorno-Karabach AO but for the most part under occupation of the Republic of Artsakh, was 393,569 in 1979, only a small Armenian minority (3,661 or only 0.9%). Also 11,000 Kurds have been deported since 1988 by separatist Armenian forces.

Ethnic Groups of the Nagorno-Karabakh AO (1926–1989) and the Artsakh Republic (2015) according to census data^{1}
Ethnic group	census 1926		census 1939		census 1959		census 1970		census 1979		census 1989		census 2005		census 2015	
Ethnic group	Number	%	Number	%	Number	%	Number	%	Number	%	Number	%	Number	%	Number	%
Armenians	111,694	89.1	132,800	88.0	110,053	84.4	121,068	80.5	123,076	75.9	145,450	76.9	137,380	99.7	144,683	99.7
Azerbaijanis	12,592	10.0	14,053	9.3	17,995	13.8	27,179	18.1	37,264	23.0	40,688	21.5	6	0.0		
Russians	596	0.5	3,174	2.1	1,790	1.4	1,310	0.9	1,265	0.8	1,922	1.0	171	0.1	238	0.1
Ukrainians			436	0.3			193	0.1	140	0.1	416	0.2	21	0.0	26	0.0
Yezidis															16	0.0
Assyrians															16	0.0
Georgians													12	0.0	15	0.0
Others	416	0.3	374	0.2	568	0.4	563	0.4	436	0.3	609	0.3	125	0.1	59	0.0
Ethnic groups as of 1979 on territories under full Armenian occupation surrounding Nagorno-Karabakh from 1993 till 2020
Azerbaijanis									182,631	97.7						
Kurds									2,441	1.3						
Russians									1,410	0.7						
Armenians									185	0-1						
Lezgins									126	0-1						
Total surroundings									186,874		201,016^{2}					
Total NKAO	125,300		150,837		130,406		150,313		162,181		189,085					
Total									349,055		390,101		137,737		145,053	
^{1}The territory of the former Nagorno-Karabakh AO and the current Republic of Artsakh is different. ^{2}The population of Artsakh-occupied territories surrounding Nagorno-Karabakh was at least 201,016 in fully occupied territories and at most 421,726 people in partially occupied territories in 1989.

== Population of the Republic of Artsakh ==
From the National Statistical Service of Republic of Artsakh:

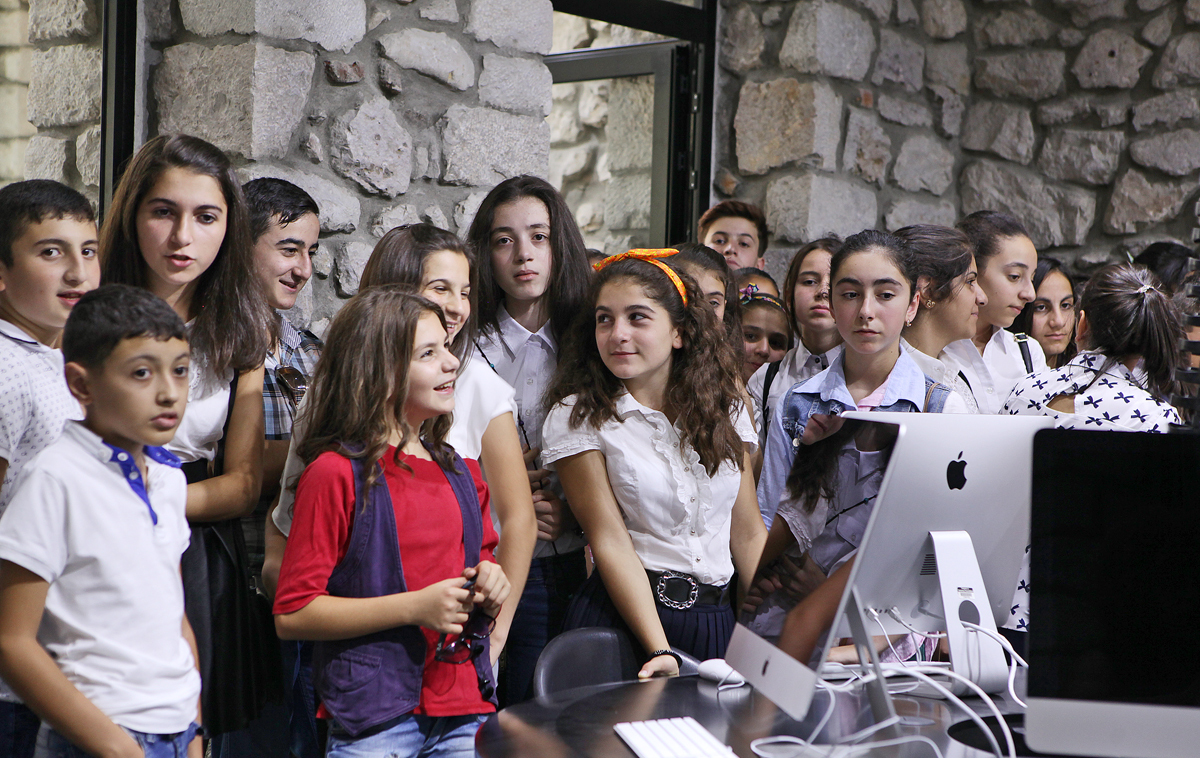
Children at Tumo Center Artsakh branch

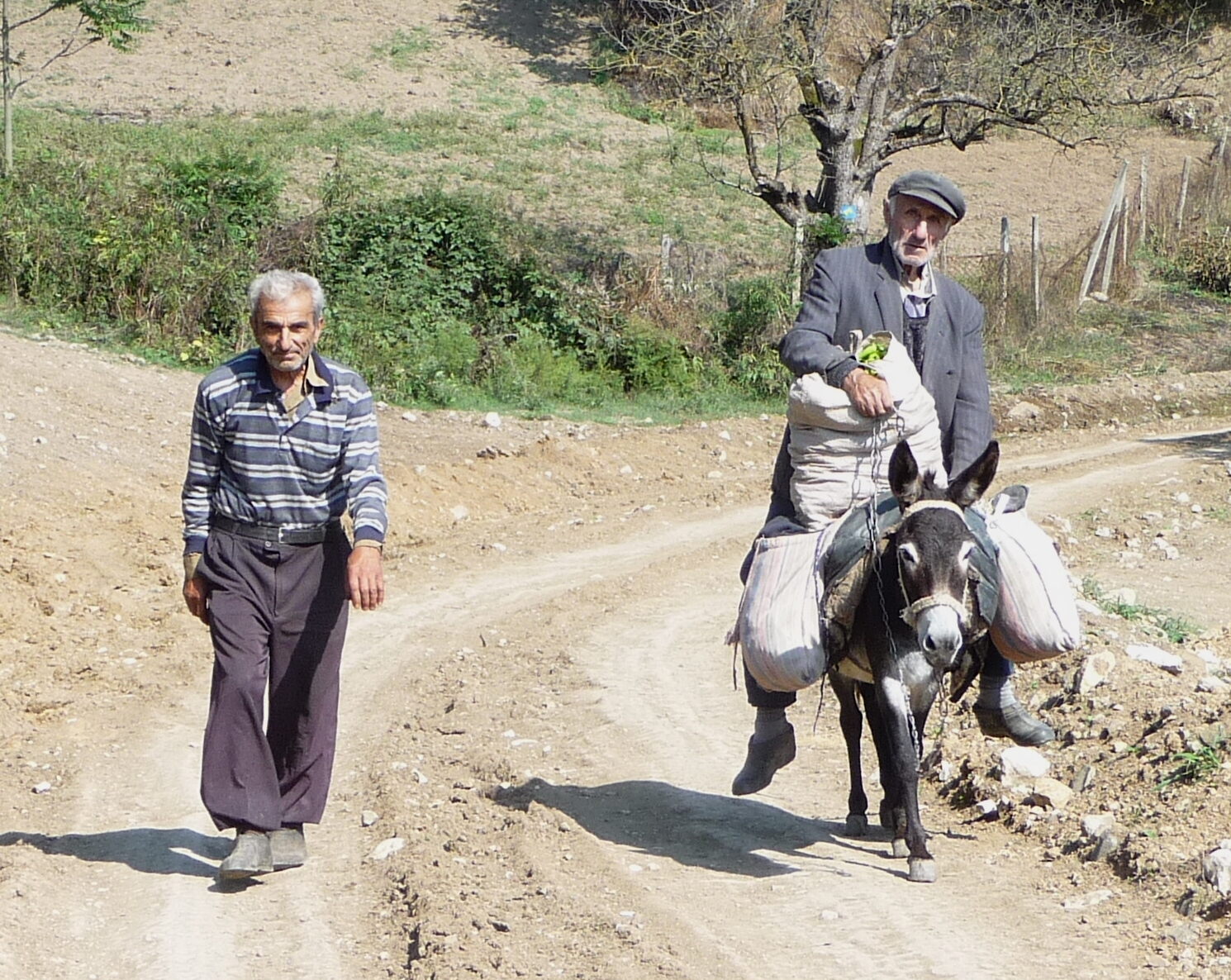
Men on a dusty road in NKR

Year	Population (000s)	Urban	Rural	Net Immigration
2000	134.4	68.4	66.0	16.1
2001	135.7	68.7	67.0	11.5
2002	136.6	69.3	67.3	4.9
2003	137.0	69.1	67.9	1.3
2004	137.2	69.8	67.4	−2.6
2005	137.7	70.5	67.2	1.7
2006	137.7	70.8	66.9	−3.2

Population by age group

Age Group	Total (000s)	Urban	Rural	% of Pop	% of Urban Pop	% of Rural Pop
0–6	15.7	7.5	8.2	11.4	10.6	12.3
7–17	25.2	12.8	12.4	18.3	18.1	18.5
18–59	75.8	41.9	33.9	55.0	59.2	50.7
60+	21.0	8.6	12.4	15.3	12.1	18.5

Population by entity on the Map of Provinces

Pop (000s)	2000	2001	2002	2003	2004	2005	2006	2015
Total	134.4	135.7	136.6	137.0	137.2	137.7	137.7	148.9
Stepanakert	49.5	49.5	49.7	49.8	49.9	50.0	50.4	55.2
Martuni Region	22.8	22.9	23.0	23.0	23.0	23.2	23.1	24.3
Martakert Region	18.9	18.7	18.8	18.8	18.8	18.9	18.9	19.9
Askeran Region	16.0	16.6	16.6	16.8	16.9	17.0	17.0	18.1
Hadrut Region	11.4	11.4	11.8	11.9	11.9	12.0	12.4	13.6
Kashatagh Region	9.8	10.0	10.0	9.9	9.8	9.7	8.6	9.3
Shushi Region	4.0	4.1	4.2	4.3	4.4	4.4	4.5	5.4
Shahumyan Region	2.0	2.5	2.5	2.5	2.5	2.5	2.8	3.1

Urban population by region

Pop (000s)	2000	2001	2002	2003	2004	2005	2006	2015
Total	68.4	68.7	69.3	69.1	69.8	70.5	70.8	84.5
Stepanakert	49.5	49.5	49.7	49.8	49.9	50.0	50.4	55.2
Askeran Region	2.3	2.1	2.0	1.9	2.0	2.0	2.1	2.3
Hadrut Region	2.5	2.5	2.8	2.8	2.7	2.8	3.0	4.1
Martakert Region	3.8	3.8	3.8	3.8	4.0	4.2	3.8	4.6
Martuni Region	4.3	4.5	4.7	4.5	4.8	4.9	4.9	10.2
Shahumyan Region	0.4	0.5	0.6	0.5	0.5	0.4	0.5	0.6
Shushi Region	2.7	2.9	3.0	3.1	3.1	3.3	3.3	4.2
Kashatagh Region	2.9	2.9	2.7	2.7	2.8	2.9	2.7	3.3

Rural population by region

Pop (000s)	2000	2001	2002	2003	2004	2005	2006	2015
Total	66.0	67.0	67.3	67.9	67.4	67.2	66.9	64.4
Stepanakert	0.0	0.0	0.0	0.0	0.0	0.0	0.0	0.0
Askeran Region	13.7	14.5	14.6	14.9	14.9	15.0	14.9	15.8
Hadrut Region	8.9	8.9	9.0	9.1	9.2	9.2	9.4	9.5
Martakert Region	15.1	14.9	15.0	15.0	14.8	14.7	15.1	15.3
Martuni Region	18.5	18.4	18.3	18.5	18.2	18.3	18.2	14.1
Shahumyan Region	1.6	2.0	1.9	2.0	2.0	2.1	2.2	2.5
Shushi Region	1.3	1.2	1.2	1.2	1.3	1.1	1.2	1.2
Kashatagh Region	6.9	7.1	7.3	7.2	7.0	6.8	5.9	6.0

== Vital statistics ==
=== Registered births and deaths ===
From the National Statistical Service of Republic of Artsakh:

	Average population	Live births	Deaths	Natural change	Crude birth rate (per 1000)	Crude death rate (per 1000)	Natural change (per 1000)	Infant mortality rate (per 1000 births)	Life expectancy males	Life expectancy females
1995	125,000	1,799	1,197	602	14.4	9.6	4.8			
1996	122,600	1,964	1,323	641	15.9	10.7	5.2			
1997	124,200	1,887	1,205	682	14.9	9.5	5.4			
1998	128,700	1,897	1,207	690	14.6	9.3	5.3			
1999	130,600	1,645	1,104	541	12.5	8.4	4.1			
2000	133,300	2,222	1,185	1,037	16.6	8.9	7.7			
2001	134,400	2,306	1,075	1,231	17.1	8.0	9.1			
2002	135,700	2,190	1,242	948	16.1	9.1	7.0			
2003	136,600	2,058	1,232	826	15.0	9.0	6.0			
2004	137,000	2,095	1,306	789	15.3	9.5	5.8			
2005	137,200	2,004	1,260	744	14.6	9.2	5.4			
2006	137,700	2,102	1,235	867	15.3	9.0	6.3			
2007	138,000	2,145	1,227	918	15.5	8.9	6.6			
2008	139,000	2,418	1,317	1,101	17.4	9.5	7.9	13.6	70.0	76.3
2009	141,000	2,821	1,266	1,555	20.0	9.0	11.0	10.6	70.3	76.9
2010	143,000	2,694	1,341	1,353	18.8	9.3	9.5	12.6	71.2	76.5
2011	144,000	2,586	1,297	1,289	17.9	9.0	8.9	12.0	70.8	75.9
2012	146,000	2,500	1,232	1,268	17.0	8.4	8.6	7.6	71.8	77.4
2013	142,800	2,371	1,344	1,027	16.0	9.1	6.9	11.8	71.0	76.0
2014	143,500	2,428	1,309	1,119	16.3	8.8	7.5	8.6	71.6	76.8
2015	144,600	2,582	1,290	1,292	17.8	8.9	8.9	10.8	71.5	76.6
2016	145,200	2,471	1,222	1,249	16.9	8.4	8.6	12.5	71.3	77.4
2017	146,100	2,336	1,238	1,098	15.9	8.4	7.5	6.4	72.6	77.5
2018	147,000	2,328	1,185	1,143	15.8	8.0	7.7	5.2	72.5	79.0
2019	148,000	2,119	1,155	964	14.3	7.8	6.5	10.9	73.2	77.8
2020	148,800	1,659	1,529	130	11.1	10.3	0.9	7.2	61.2	78.2
2021	120,000									

==== Current vital statistics ====
Period	Live births	Deaths	Natural increase
January - June 2020	980	596	+384
January - June 2021	660	748	-88
Difference	▼ -320 (-32.65%)	▲ +152 (+25.50%)	▼ -472

==== Vital statistics for urban population ====
Year	Births	Deaths	NG	BR	DR	NGR
2000	1,158	566	592	16.9	8.3	8.7
2001	1,162	519	643	16.9	7.6	9.4
2002	1,120	539	581	16.2	7.8	8.4
2003	1,106	579	527	16.0	8.4	7.6
2004	1,235	662	573	17.7	9.5	8.2
2005	1,132	640	492	16.1	9.1	7.0
2006	1,202	605	597	17.0	8.6	8.4

==== Vital statistics for rural population ====
Year	Births	Deaths	NG	BR	DR	NGR
2000	1,064	619	445	16.1	9.4	6.7
2001	1,144	556	588	17.1	8.3	8.8
2002	1,070	703	367	15.9	10.4	5.5
2003	952	653	299	14.0	9.6	4.4
2004	860	644	216	12.8	9.6	3.2
2005	872	620	252	13.0	9.2	3.8
2006	900	630	270	13.5	9.4	4.0

== See also ==
- Demographics of Armenia
- Demographics of Azerbaijan
- List of cities and towns in Artsakh
- Peoples of the Caucasus
