= Baharlı =

Baharlı or Bakharly or Bagarly may refer to:

== Places ==
=== Azerbaijan ===
- Baharlı, Agdam (disambiguation)
  - Baharlı, Üçoğlan
  - Baharlı, Xındırıstan
  - Birinci Baharlı
  - İkinci Baharlı
- Baharlı, Zangilan

=== Turkey ===
- Baharlı, Bismil
- Baharlı, Tarsus, a village in the district of Tarsus, Mersin Province

=== Turkmenistan ===
- Baharly District

== Seo also ==
- Baharlu (disambiguation)
