= Qasımbəyli =

Qasımbəyli or Qasimbəyli and Qasımbeyli or Kasymbeyli or Kasumbegly or Kasumbeyli may refer to:

- Qasımbəyli, Agdam, Azerbaijan
- Qasımbəyli, Agsu, Azerbaijan
- Qasımbəyli, Barda, Azerbaijan
- Qasımbəyli, Goranboy, Azerbaijan
- Qasımbəyli, Jalilabad, Azerbaijan
- Qasımbəyli, Sabirabad, Azerbaijan
