= Baharlı, Agdam =

Baharlı, Agdam may refer to:

- Baharlı, Üçoğlan
- Baharlı, Xındırıstan
- Birinci Baharlı
- İkinci Baharlı
