= Yuxarı Qılıncbağ =

- Location within Azerbaijan Location within Karabakh Economic Region
- Coordinates: 39°58′49″N 46°47′09″E
- Country: Azerbaijan (de jure); Artsakh (de facto)
- District: Khojaly (de jure)
- Province: Askeran (de facto)
- Elevation: 869 m (2,851 ft)
- Time zone: UTC+4 (AZT)

Yuxarı Qılıncbağ (Yukhary Gilinchbagh) is a village de jure in the Khojaly District of Azerbaijan, but de facto in the Askeran Province of the self-proclaimed Republic of Artsakh.
