= Dedeli =

Dedeli may refer to:

- Dedeli, Valandovo, North Macedonia
- Dedeli, Kırşehir, in Kırşehir Province, Turkey

== See also ==
- Dədəli (disambiguation)
