= İmanlar =

İmanlar or Imanlar may refer to:

- İmanlar, Lachin, a village in the Lachin District of Azerbaijan
- İmanlar, Shusha, a village in the Shusha District of Azerbaijan
