= Yüzbaşılı =

Yüzbaşılı or Yuzbaşlı or Yuzbashly or Yuzbashyly may refer to:

- Birinci Yüzbaşılı, Azerbaijan
- İkinci Yüzbaşılı, Azerbaijan
