= Əlimədədli =

Əlimədədli or Alimadadli may refer to:

- Əlimədədli, Agdam, Azerbaijan
- Əlimədədli, Goygol, Azerbaijan
