= Səfərli =

Səfərli or Safarly may refer to:

- Səfərli, Agdam, Azerbaijan
- Səfərli, Tovuz, Azerbaijan
- Eltaj Safarli (born 1992), Azerbaijani chess Grandmaster
