= Askeran Province =

Coordinates: 39.8402°N 46.8086°E

Askeran Ասկերան
- Province
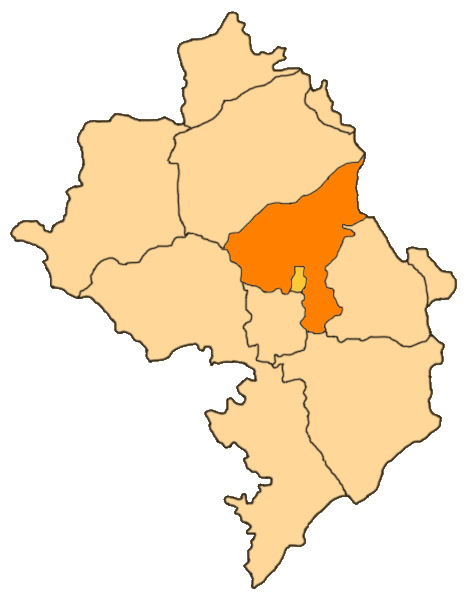
- Country: Artsakh (de facto); Azerbaijan (de jure)
- Capital: Askeran

Government
  - Governor: Sergey Grigoryan

Area
  - Total: 1,222 km^{2} (472 sq mi)
  - Rank: Ranked 5th

Population (2013)
  - Total: 18,251
  - Rank: Ranked 4th
  - Density: 15/km^{2} (39/sq mi)
- Website: Askeran Province

Askeran Province (Armenian: Ասկերանի շրջան) was a province of the breakaway Republic of Artsakh, de jure part of the Khojaly District of the Republic of Azerbaijan. It was in the center of Artsakh, surrounding the capital, Stepanakert. It was notable for containing the Tigranakert of Artsakh.

== Settlements ==
There are 42 communities in the province of which 1 is considered urban and 41 are considered rural.

== Geography ==
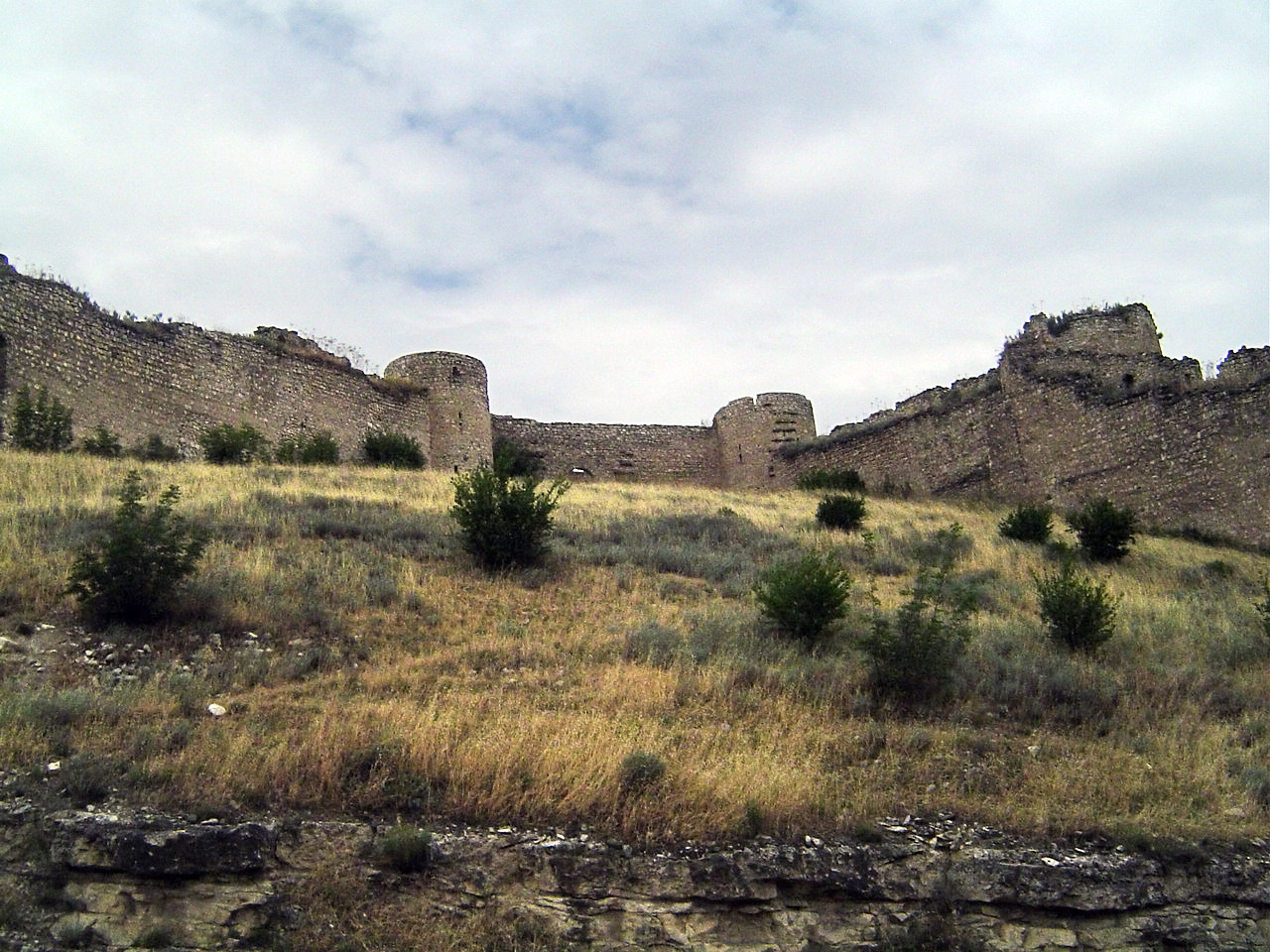
The remains of Askeran fortress

Askeran adjoins Martakert Province on the north, Aghdam District of Azerbaijan on the east. Hadrut Province and Shushi Province in the south, Martuni Province in the south east and Kashatagh Province on the west. Stepanakert, the capital of the Republic of Artsakh, is located south-west of the province.

== History ==
During the Middle Ages the western part of the Askeran Province was part of Principality of Khachen and the eastern part was part of the Principality of Varanda, the center of which was Avetaranots, located in the south of the region.

Following the formation of the Nagorno-Karabakh Autonomous Oblast a raion was formed which was centered on Stepanakert. In 1978, Askeran became its center, and the raion was renamed to Askeran. A total of 52 settlements were registered in 1979.

As the Karabakh conflict started, the Azerbaijani government began to implement a plan to create a new district center. From 1988 to 1990 the population of Khojaly village was increased from 2135 to 6000 residents. These mainly consisted of immigrants from Central Asia (more than 2000 Meskhetian Turks) and Armenia (about 2000). In April 1990, Khojaly received city status, becoming a regional center.
