= Yusifli, Agdam =

Village in Aghdam District, Azerbaijan

Coordinates: 39°58′31″N 47°03′20″E

Yusifli is a village in the municipality of Üçoğlan in the Aghdam District of Azerbaijan.
