= Qalayçılar =

- Location within Azerbaijan Location within Karabakh Economic Region
- Coordinates: 40°07′33″N 46°49′04″E
- Country: Azerbaijan
- Rayon: Agdam
- Time zone: UTC+4 (AZT)
  - Summer (DST): UTC+5 (AZT)

Qalayçılar (also known as Kalaychylar) is a village in the Agdam Rayon of Azerbaijan.
