= Turabxan =

- Location within Azerbaijan Location within Karabakh Economic Region
- Coordinates: 39°46′N 46°34′E
- Country: Azerbaijan (de jure); Artsakh (de facto)
- Rayon: Shusha
- Time zone: UTC+4
  - Summer (DST): UTC+5

Turabxan (Turabkhan) is a village de jure in the Shusha District of Azerbaijan, de facto in the Shushi Province of the self-proclaimed Republic of Artsakh.
