= Keştazlı =

- Location within Azerbaijan Location within Karabakh Economic Region
- Coordinates: 40°01′07.9″N 46°56′45.7″E
- Country: Azerbaijan
- Rayon: Agdam
- Time zone: UTC+4 (AZT)
  - Summer (DST): UTC+5 (AZT)

Keştazlı (Keshtazly) is a village in the Agdam District of Azerbaijan.
