= Bəybabalar =

- Village
- Location within Azerbaijan Location within Karabakh Economic Region
- Coordinates: 40°08′29″N 47°04′59.9″E
- Country: Azerbaijan
- Rayon: Agdam
- Municipality: Xındırıstan
- Time zone: UTC+4 (AZT)
  - Summer (DST): UTC+5 (AZT)

Bəybabalar is a village in the municipality of Xındırıstan in the Agdam District of Azerbaijan.
