= Xındırıstan =

Khyndyrystan
- Municipality
- Azerbaijani: Xındırıstan
- Location within Azerbaijan Location within Karabakh Economic Region
- Coordinates: 40°07′17″N 47°06′27″E
- Country: Azerbaijan
- District: Aghdam

Population
  - Total: 6,502
- Time zone: UTC+4 (AZT)
  - Summer (DST): UTC+5 (AZT)

Xındırıstan (Khyndyrystan) is a village and municipality in the Aghdam District of Azerbaijan. It has a population of 6,502. The municipality consists of the villages of Khyndyrystan, Dadaşlı, Sarıçoban, Qasımbəyli, Kəbləhüseynli, Paşabəyli, Birinci Yüzbaşılı, İkinci Yüzbaşılı, Baharlı, and Bəybabalar.

== Ismailbeytepe ==
The settlement Ismailbeytepe is a very early archaeological site near the village. It goes back to 5250 BC. It is one of the earliest Neolithic sites in the Karabakh region.
