= Qarazeynallı =

- Location within Azerbaijan Location within Karabakh Economic Region
- Coordinates: 39°58′53.7″N 46°56′33.5″E
- Country: Azerbaijan
- Rayon: Agdam
- Time zone: UTC+4 (AZT)
  - Summer (DST): UTC+5 (AZT)

Qarazeynallı (Garazeynally) is a village in the Agdam District of Azerbaijan.
