= Şıxbabalı =

- Location within Azerbaijan Location within Karabakh Economic Region
- Coordinates: 39°57′25″N 46°56′03″E
- Country: Azerbaijan
- Rayon: Agdam
- Time zone: UTC+4 (AZT)
  - Summer (DST): UTC+5 (AZT)

Şıxbabalı (also, Shikhbabaly and Shykhbabaly) is a village in the Aghdam Rayon of Azerbaijan.
