= Kəbləhüseynli =

Village in Aghdam District, Azerbaijan

Kəbləhüseynli (also, Kəlbahüseynli) is a village in the municipality of Xındırıstan in the Agdam Rayon of Azerbaijan.
