= Dədəli =

Dədəli may refer to:

- Dədəli, Agsu, Azerbaijan
- Dədəli, Fizuli, Azerbaijan
- Dədəli, Khachmaz, Azerbaijan
