= Baharlu =

Baharlu may refer to:

- Baharlu (ethnic group) in Iran
- Baharlu, Armenia
- Baharlu, Iran

== See also ==
- Baharlı (disambiguation)
