= Xudaverdilər =

- Location within Azerbaijan Location within Karabakh Economic Region
- Coordinates: 39°45′46.1″N 46°42′25.8″E
- Country: Azerbaijan (de jure); Artsakh (de facto)
- Rayon: Shusha
- Time zone: UTC+4
  - Summer (DST): UTC+5

Xudaverdilər (Khudaverdiler) is a village de jure in the Shusha District of Azerbaijan, de facto in the Shushi Province of the self-proclaimed Republic of Artsakh.
