= Cəmillər =

Village in Shusha, Azerbaijan

- Location within Azerbaijan Location within Karabakh Economic Region
- Coordinates: 39°45′11.1″N 46°35′09.3″E
- Country: Azerbaijan (de jure); Artsakh (de facto)
- Rayon: Shusha
- Time zone: UTC+4
  - Summer (DST): UTC+5

Cəmillər (Jamillar) is a village de jure in the Shusha District of Azerbaijan, de facto in the Shushi Province of the self-proclaimed Republic of Artsakh. It is located 32 km east of the center of the province, in a mountainous area.
