= Salahsəmədlər =

- Interactive map of Salahsəmədlər
- Country: Azerbaijan
- Rayon: Agdam
- Time zone: UTC+4 (AZT)
  - Summer (DST): UTC+5 (AZT)

Salahsəmədlər (Salahsamedler) is a village in the Agdam District of Azerbaijan.
