= Həsənqulular =

Village in Shusha, Azerbaijan

- Location within Azerbaijan Location within Karabakh Economic Region
- Coordinates: 39°45′01.3″N 46°36′40.4″E
- Country: Azerbaijan (de jure); Artsakh (de facto)
- Rayon: Shusha
- Time zone: UTC+4
  - Summer (DST): UTC+5

Həsənqulular (Hasangulular) is a village de jure in the Shusha District of Azerbaijan, de facto in the Shushi Province of the self-proclaimed Republic of Artsakh.
