= Abdınlı =

- Location within Azerbaijan Location within Karabakh Economic Region
- Coordinates: 40°05′23.0″N 46°58′37.1″E
- Country: Azerbaijan
- Rayon: Agdam
- Time zone: UTC+4 (AZT)
  - Summer (DST): UTC+5 (AZT)

Abdınlı (Abdynly) is a village in the Agdam District of Azerbaijan.
