= Böyükbəyli =

- Location within Azerbaijan Location within Karabakh Economic Region
- Coordinates: 40°06′11″N 47°08′06″E
- Country: Azerbaijan
- Rayon: Agdam
- Municipality: Üçoğlan
- Time zone: UTC+4 (AZT)
  - Summer (DST): UTC+5 (AZT)

Böyükbəyli (Boyukbeyli) is a village in the Agdam District of Azerbaijan. The village forms part of the municipality of Üçoğlan.
