= Orta Qışlaq =

Village in Aghdam District, Azerbaijan

Coordinates: 40°05′N 47°08′E

Orta Qışlaq (also, Ortaqışlaq) is a village in the municipality of Üçoğlan in the Agdam Rayon of Azerbaijan.
