= Acarlı =

- Location within Azerbaijan Location within Karabakh Economic Region
- Coordinates: 39°58′39.5″N 47°00′45.6″E
- Country: Azerbaijan
- Rayon: Agdam
- Time zone: UTC+4 (AZT)
  - Summer (DST): UTC+5 (AZT)

Acarlı (Ajarly) is a village in the Agdam District of Azerbaijan.
