= Üçoğlan =

Uchoghlan
- Municipality
- Azerbaijani: Üçoğlan
- Location within Azerbaijan Location within Karabakh Economic Region
- Coordinates: 40°06′06″N 47°06′42″E
- Country: Azerbaijan
- District: Aghdam

Population
  - Total: 2,555
- Time zone: UTC+4 (AZT)
  - Summer (DST): UTC+5 (AZT)

Üçoğlan (Uchoghlan) is a village and municipality in the Aghdam District of Azerbaijan. It has a population of 2,555. The municipality consists of the villages of Uchoghlan, Orta Qışlaq, Yusifli, Baharlı, Ballar, Böyükbəyli, Birinci Baharlı, İkinci Baharlı, and Səfərli.
