= Şişpapaqlar =

- Location within Azerbaijan Location within Karabakh Economic Region
- Coordinates: 40°04′N 46°58′E
- Country: Azerbaijan
- Rayon: Agdam
- Time zone: UTC+4 (AZT)
  - Summer (DST): UTC+5 (AZT)

Şişpapaqlar (also known as Shishpapakhlar) is a village in the Agdam Rayon of Azerbaijan.
