= Paşabəyli =

Village in Aghdam District, Azerbaijan

Coordinates: 40°08′N 47°06′E

Paşabəyli is a village in the municipality of Xındırıstan in the Agdam Rayon of Azerbaijan.
