= Şahbulaq, Agdam =

Şahbulaq
- Location within Azerbaijan Location within Karabakh Economic Region
- Coordinates: 40°04′33.4″N 46°54′08.1″E
- Country: Azerbaijan
- Rayon: Agdam
- Time zone: UTC+4 (AZT)
  - Summer (DST): UTC+5 (AZT)

Şahbulaq (Shahbulag) is a village in the Agdam District of Azerbaijan.
