= Qaraqaşlı, Agdam =

Qaraqaşlı
- Location within Azerbaijan Location within Karabakh Economic Region
- Coordinates: 40°04′30.5″N 46°59′46.2″E
- Country: Azerbaijan
- Rayon: Agdam
- Time zone: UTC+4 (AZT)
  - Summer (DST): UTC+5 (AZT)

Qaraqaşlı (Garagashly) is a village in the Agdam District of Azerbaijan.
