= Tükəzbanlı =

- Location within Azerbaijan Location within Karabakh Economic Region
- Coordinates: 40°05′57.2″N 46°54′58.8″E
- Country: Azerbaijan
- Rayon: Agdam
- Time zone: UTC+4 (AZT)
  - Summer (DST): UTC+5 (AZT)

Tükəzbanlı (Tukezbanly) is a village in the Agdam District of Azerbaijan.
