= Dadaşlı =

- Village
- Location within Azerbaijan Location within Karabakh Economic Region
- Coordinates: 40°07′30.4″N 47°06′59.8″E
- Country: Azerbaijan
- Rayon: Agdam
- Municipality: Xındırıstan
- Time zone: UTC+4 (AZT)
  - Summer (DST): UTC+5 (AZT)

Dadaşlı (Dadashly) is a village in the municipality of Xındırıstan in the Agdam District of Azerbaijan.
