= Pirzadlı =

- Interactive map of Pirzadlı
- Country: Azerbaijan
- Rayon: Agdam
- Time zone: UTC+4 (AZT)
  - Summer (DST): UTC+5 (AZT)

Pirzadlı (Pirzadly) is a village in the Agdam District of Azerbaijan.
