= Ballar =

- Location within Azerbaijan Location within Karabakh Economic Region
- Coordinates: 40°06′N 47°07′E
- Country: Azerbaijan
- Rayon: Agdam
- Municipality: Üçoğlan
- Time zone: UTC+4 (AZT)
  - Summer (DST): UTC+5 (AZT)

Ballar is a village in the Agdam District of Azerbaijan. The village forms part of the municipality of Üçoğlan.
