= Bozavend =

- Village
- Location within Azerbaijan
- Coordinates: 40°09′26″N 46°51′58″E
- Country: Azerbaijan
- Rayon: Agdam
- Time zone: UTC+4 (AZT)

Bozavend is a village in the Agdam District of Azerbaijan.
