= Mafruzlu, Azerbaijan =

Mafruzlu
- Village
- Location within Azerbaijan Location within Karabakh Economic Region
- Coordinates: 40°11′37″N 47°00′34″E
- Country: Azerbaijan
- Rayon: Agdam
- Time zone: UTC+4 (AZT)
  - Summer (DST): UTC+5 (AZT)

Mafruzlu is a village in the Agdam Rayon of Azerbaijan.
