= Birinci Yüzbaşılı =

- Location within Azerbaijan Location within Karabakh Economic Region
- Coordinates: 40°08′43″N 47°05′19″E
- Country: Azerbaijan
- Rayon: Agdam
- Municipality: Xındırıstan
- Time zone: UTC+4 (AZT)
  - Summer (DST): UTC+5 (AZT)

Birinci Yüzbaşılı (Birinci Yuzbashly) is a village in the Agdam District of Azerbaijan. The village forms part of the municipality of Xındırıstan.
