= İmanlar, Shusha =

Village in Shusha, Azerbaijan

İmanlar
- Interactive map of İmanlar
- Country: Azerbaijan (de jure); Artsakh (de facto)
- Rayon: Shusha
- Time zone: UTC+4
  - Summer (DST): UTC+5

İmanlar (Imanlar) is a village de jure in the Shusha District of Azerbaijan, de facto in the Shushi Province of the self-proclaimed Republic of Artsakh.
