= Səfərli, Agdam =

Village in Aghdam District, Azerbaijan

Səfərli is a village in the municipality of Üçoğlan in the Agdam Rayon of Azerbaijan.
