= Ərəbmehdibəy =

- Municipality
- Location within Azerbaijan
- Coordinates: 40°32′42″N 48°10′43″E
- Country: Azerbaijan
- Rayon: Agsu

Population
  - Total: 1,580
- Time zone: UTC+4 (AZT)
  - Summer (DST): UTC+5 (AZT)

Ərəbmehdibəy (also, Arabmekhdibey, Arabmekhdybey, Arabmekhtibek, and Arabmekhtibeyli) is a village and municipality in the Agsu Rayon of Azerbaijan. It has a population of 1,580. The municipality consists of the villages of Ərəbmehdibəy, Dədəli, Qasımbəyli, and Mustafalı.
