= İkinci Yüzbaşılı =

- Location within Azerbaijan Location within Karabakh Economic Region
- Coordinates: 40°07′N 47°08′E
- Country: Azerbaijan
- Rayon: Agdam
- Municipality: Xındırıstan
- Time zone: UTC+4 (AZT)
  - Summer (DST): UTC+5 (AZT)

İkinci Yüzbaşılı (also, İkinci Yuzbaşlı, Yuzbashly, and Yuzbashyly Vtoryye) is a village in the Agdam Rayon of Azerbaijan. The village forms part of the municipality of Xındırıstan.
