= Məsimlər =

- Location within Azerbaijan
- Coordinates: 40°42′N 45°32′E
- Country: Azerbaijan
- Rayon: Tovuz
- Municipality: Böyük Qışlaq
- Time zone: UTC+4 (AZT)
  - Summer (DST): UTC+5 (AZT)

Məsimlər (also, Məsmallar and Mesmalar) is a village in the Tovuz Rayon of Azerbaijan. The village forms part of the municipality of Böyük Qışlaq.
