= Urakhach =

Urakhach / Ulubaba Ուրախաչ / Ուլուպապ
- Location within Azerbaijan Location within Karabakh Economic Region
- Coordinates: 40°01′10″N 46°41′45″E
- Country: Azerbaijan
  - District: Khojaly
- Time zone: UTC+4 (AZT)

Urakhach (Armenian: Ուրախաչ, also Urukhach, Ուրուխաչ) or Ulubaba (Armenian: Ուլուպապ, romanized: Ulupap) is a village in the Khojaly District of Azerbaijan, in the region of Nagorno-Karabakh. Until 2023 it was controlled by the breakaway Republic of Artsakh. The village had an ethnic Armenian-majority population until the expulsion of the Armenian population of Nagorno-Karabakh by Azerbaijan following the 2023 Azerbaijani offensive in Nagorno-Karabakh.

== History ==
During the Soviet period, the village was a part of the Askeran District of the Nagorno-Karabakh Autonomous Oblast.

== Economy and culture ==
The village is part of the community of Khachen. As of 2015, the village is uninhabited.
