= Mustafalı =

- Location within Azerbaijan
- Coordinates: 40°29′09″N 48°08′06″E
- Country: Azerbaijan
- Rayon: Agsu
- Municipality: Ərəbmehdibəy
- Time zone: UTC+4 (AZT)
  - Summer (DST): UTC+5 (AZT)

Mustafalı is a village in the Agsu Rayon of Azerbaijan. The village forms part of the municipality of Ərəbmehdibəy.
