= Qasımbəyli, Agdam =

Village in Aghdam District, Azerbaijan

Coordinates: 40.134736°N 47.165848°E

Qasımbəyli is a village in the municipality of Xındırıstan in the Agdam Rayon of Azerbaijan.
