= Şamlıq =

- Location within Azerbaijan
- Coordinates: 40°43′N 45°38′E
- Country: Azerbaijan
- Rayon: Tovuz
- Municipality: Böyük Qışlaq
- Time zone: UTC+4 (AZT)
  - Summer (DST): UTC+5 (AZT)

Şamlıq (also, Shamlykh) is a village in the Tovuz Rayon of Azerbaijan. The village forms part of the municipality of Böyük Qışlaq.

== See also ==
- Böyük Şamlıq
