= Böyük Qışlaq =

- Municipality
- Location within Azerbaijan
- Coordinates: 40°42′31″N 45°32′40″E
- Country: Azerbaijan
- Rayon: Tovuz

Population
  - Total: 2,758
- Time zone: UTC+4 (AZT)
  - Summer (DST): UTC+5 (AZT)

Böyük Qışlaq (also, Böyükqışlaq, Bëyuk Kyshlak, Beyuk-Kyshlag, and Böyükqıslaq) is a village and municipality in the Tovuz Rayon of Azerbaijan. It has a population of 2,758. The municipality consists of the villages of Böyük Qışlaq, Məsimlər, Mollalar, Səfərli, and Şamlıq.
