= Administrative divisions of the Republic of Artsakh =

Political subdivisions of the Republic of Artsakh

Regions of the Republic of Artsakh Շրջանները Արցախի Հանրապետության (Shrjannerë Arts’akhi Hanrapetut’yan) (Armenian)
- Provinces of the Republic of Artsakh. Solid colors: Soviet-era NKAO controlled by Artsakh from 2020 to 2023; horizontal stripes: Azerbaijani-ruled, claimed by Artsakh: 1. Martakert; 2. Askeran; 3. Stepanakert; 4. Martuni; 5. Shushi Province; 6. Hadrut; 7. Shahumyan Province
- Category: Unitary state
- Location: Artsakh
- Number: 6 provinces 1 special status city
- Populations: 2,560 (Shahumyan) – 49,986 (Stepanakert)
- Areas: 26 km^{2} (9.9 sq mi) (Stepanakert) – 3,380 km^{2} (1,304 sq mi) (Kashatagh)
- Government: Region government, National government
- Subdivisions: Urban community, Rural community

The administrative divisions of the Republic of Artsakh were of two types; provinces and cities. There were six provinces and one special administrative city (the capital of the Republic, Stepanakert).

Municipalities in Artsakh were divided into 2 categories: urban communities and rural communities. Before the 2020 war, there were 10 towns (urban) and 322 villages (rural) in Artsakh.

== Administrative divisions ==
These divisions included territories never controlled by the Republic of Artsakh. They were officially considered occupied by Azerbaijan.

Province	Population (2005 census)	Area (km^{2})	Capital	Map
1 Martakert Province	18,963	1,795	Martakert	
2 Askeran Province	16,979	1,222	Askeran	
3 Stepanakert	49,986	25.66	Stepanakert	
4 Martuni Province	23,158	951	Martuni	
5 Shushi Province	4,324	383	Shushi	
6 Hadrut Province	12,005	1,877	Hadrut	
7 Shahumyan Province	2,560	1,830	Karvachar	
8 Kashatagh Province	9,763	3,377	Berdzor	

== Azerbaijan divisions and claimed territories ==
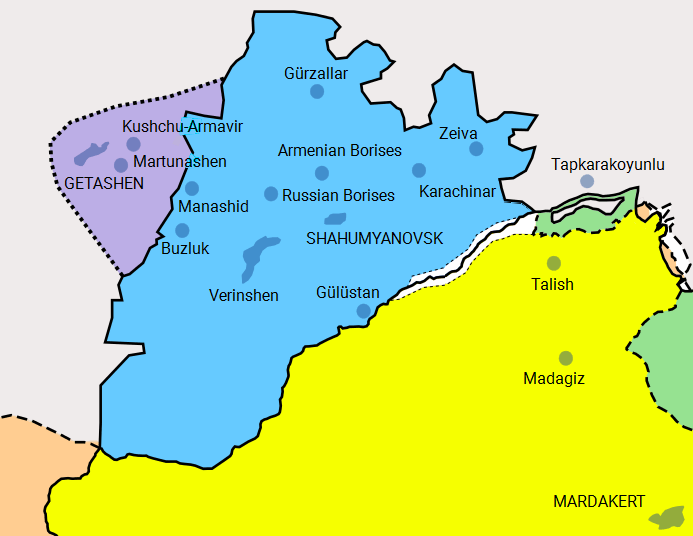
Former Soviet Shahumyan district and the territory known as "Getashen subdistrict" where Shahumyan Province was originally formed

Before the Artsakh republic was established, the territory was organized by the Republic of Azerbaijan into a number of rayons (districts). Artsakh extended its provinces across the border of the former Nagorno-Karabakh Autonomous Oblast (NKAO), removing the administrative distinction between the two areas. The following districts, which were not part of the NKAO but were in Azerbaijan proper, were completely within the de facto borders of Artsakh before the 2020 Nagorno-Karabakh war: Lachin, Qubadli, Zangilan, Jabrayil, Kalbajar. Additionally, parts of the following districts were partly under the control of Artsakh: Agdam District and Fuzuli District.

Former Nagorno-Karabakh Autonomous Oblast
District (Rayon)	Area (km^{2})	Under NKR control (km^{2})	%
Askeran District	928	860	93
Hadrut District	679	0	0
Mardakert District	1,705	1,475	87
Martuni District	792	447	56
Shusha District	280	169	60
NKAO	4,384	2,951	67

=== Pre-2020 war ===
Regions of Artsakh before the 2020 war: 1: Martakert; 2: Askeran; 3: Stepanakert (city); 4: Martuni; 5: Shushi; 6: Hadrut; 7: Shahumyan; 8: Kashatagh (Vertical dashed lines indicate territory outside of the former Nagorno-Karabakh Autonomous Oblast and Shahumyan Region. Horizontal dashed lines indicate territory under the control of Azerbaijan before the war.)

Before the 2020 Nagorno-Karabakh war, there were seven provinces. The districts of Azerbaijan surrounding Nagorno-Karabakh that were administered by Artsakh were: Lachin District, Qubadli District, Zangilan District, Jabrayil District and Kalbajar District, as well as parts of Agdam, and Fuzuli District. On the other hand, the eastern ends of Martakert and Martuni were under Azerbaijani control.

Former Nagorno-Karabakh Autonomous Oblast
District (Rayon)	Area (km^{2})	Under NKR control (km^{2})	%
Askeran District	928	928	100
Hadrut District	679	679	100
Mardakert District	1,705	1,571	92
Martuni District	792	632	80
Shusha District	280	280	100
NKAO	4,384	4.090	93
Rayons of Azerbaijan SSR other than in NKAO
Southern part of Goranboy District	558	0	0
Kalbajar District	1,936	1,936	100
Lachin District	1,835	1,835	100
Qubadli District	802	802	100
Zangilan District	707	707	100
Jabrayil District	1,050	1,050	100
Fuzuli District	1,390	462	33.2
Agdam District	1,150	842	73.2
Azerbaijan	8,870	7,634	86.1

== See also ==
Caucasus political (2008)

- Administrative divisions of Armenia
