= Mollalar, Tovuz =

Mollalar
- Location within Azerbaijan
- Coordinates: 40°43′N 45°34′E
- Country: Azerbaijan
- Rayon: Tovuz
- Municipality: Böyük Qışlaq
- Time zone: UTC+4 (AZT)
  - Summer (DST): UTC+5 (AZT)

Mollalar is a village in the Tovuz Rayon of Azerbaijan. The village forms part of the municipality of Böyük Qışlaq.
