= Birinci Baharlı =

- Village
- Location within Azerbaijan
- Coordinates: 40°02′30.5″N 47°06′00″E
- Country: Azerbaijan
- Rayon: Agdam
- Municipality: Üçoğlan
- Time zone: UTC+4 (AZT)
  - Summer (DST): UTC+5 (AZT)

Birinci Baharlı is a village in the municipality of Üçoğlan in the Agdam District of Azerbaijan.
