= Qasımbəyli, Goranboy =

Qasımbəyli
- Municipality
- Location within Azerbaijan
- Coordinates: 40°30′N 46°51′E
- Country: Azerbaijan
- Rayon: Goranboy

Population
  - Total: 387
- Time zone: UTC+4 (AZT)
  - Summer (DST): UTC+5 (AZT)

Qasımbəyli (also, Kasymbeyli) is a village and municipality in the Goranboy Rayon of Azerbaijan. It has a population of 387.
