= Səfərli, Tovuz =

Səfərli
- Location within Azerbaijan
- Coordinates: 40°41′56″N 45°31′53″E
- Country: Azerbaijan
- Rayon: Tovuz
- Municipality: Böyük Qışlaq
- Time zone: UTC+4 (AZT)
  - Summer (DST): UTC+5 (AZT)

Səfərli (also, Safarly) is a village in the Tovuz Rayon of Azerbaijan. The village forms part of the municipality of Böyük Qışlaq.
