= Baharlu, Armenia =

Baharlu
- Location within Armenia Location within Syunik Province
- Coordinates: 39°13′15″N 46°13′13″E
- Country: Armenia
- Province: Syunik
- Time zone: UTC+4 (UTC)
  - Summer (DST): UTC+5 (DST)

Baharlu (also Bagarlu) is a village in Syunik Province, Armenia.

== See also ==
- Syunik Province
