= Əlimədədli, Goygol =

Əlimədədli
- Municipality
- Location within Azerbaijan
- Coordinates: 40°45′46″N 46°18′30″E
- Country: Azerbaijan
- Rayon: Goygol

Population
  - Total: 321
- Time zone: UTC+4 (AZT)
  - Summer (DST): UTC+5 (AZT)

Əlimədədli is a village and municipality in the Goygol Rayon of Azerbaijan. It has a population of 321.
