= Khachen, Nagorno-Karabakh =

Khachen / Seyidbeyli Խաչեն / Seyidbəyli
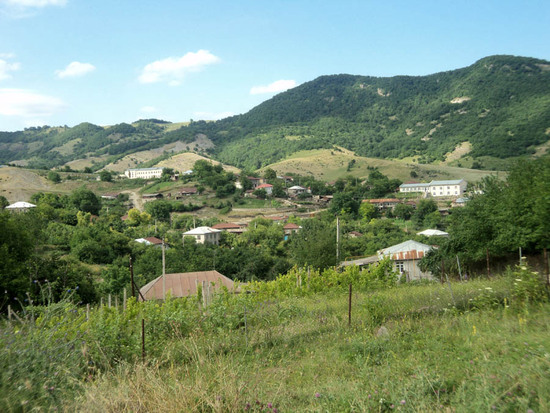
- A view of Khachen

- Location within Azerbaijan Location within Karabakh Economic Region
- Coordinates: 39°59′05″N 46°41′42″E
- Country: Azerbaijan
  - District: Khojaly
- Elevation: 958 m (3,143 ft)

Population (2015)
  - Total: 332
- Time zone: UTC+4 (AZT)

Khachen (Armenian: Խաչեն) or Seyidbeyli (Azerbaijani: Seyidbəyli) is a village in the region of Nagorno-Karabakh, Azerbaijan. Until 2023 it was controlled by the breakaway Republic of Artsakh. The village had an ethnic Armenian-majority population until the expulsion of the Armenian population of Nagorno-Karabakh by Azerbaijan following the 2023 Azerbaijani offensive in Nagorno-Karabakh.

== Toponymy ==
The village was known as Seyidishen (Russian: Сеидишен) during the Soviet period.

During the Soviet period, the village was a part of the Askeran District of the Nagorno-Karabakh Autonomous Oblast.

== Historical heritage sites ==
Historical heritage sites in and around the village include the 12th/13th-century fortress of Kachaghakaberd in the mountains to the west, a 12th/13th-century khachkar, the 13th-century St. Stephen's Church (Armenian: Սուրբ Ստեփանոս եկեղեցի, romanized: Surb Stepanos Yekeghetsi), the 13th/14th-century monastery of Ptkes Berk (Armenian: Պտկես բերք), an 18th-century village, and the 19th-century St. John's Church (Armenian: Սուրբ Հովհաննես եկեղեցի, romanized: Surb Hovhannes Yekeghetsi).

== Economy and culture ==
The population was mainly engaged in agriculture and animal husbandry as of 2015, when the village had a municipal building, a house of culture, a secondary school, a kindergarten and a medical centre. The community of Khachen includes the village of Urakhach.

== Demographics ==
The village had 369 inhabitants in 2005, and 332 inhabitants in 2015.

As of January 2026, 69 Azerbaijani families, totaling 250 individuals, have been resettled in the village by Azerbaijan.

== Gallery ==
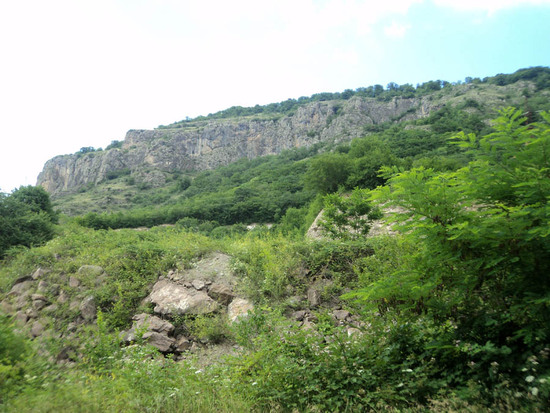
Mountains near Khachen

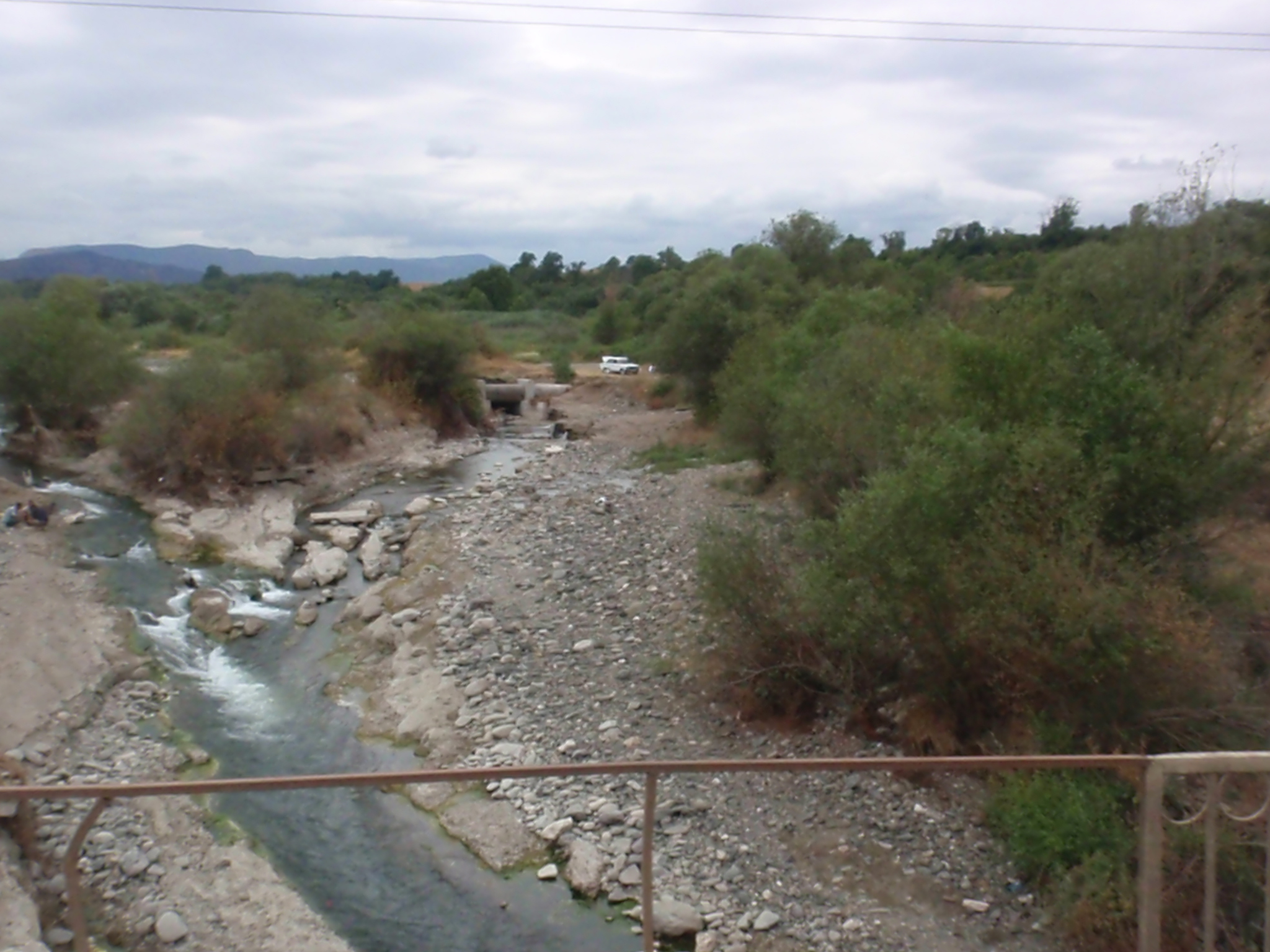
The Khachenaget river which demarcates the boundary between the provinces of Askeran and Martakert
