= İkinci Baharlı =

Village in Aghdam District, Azerbaijan

Coordinates: 40°06′N 47°05′E

İkinci Baharlı is a village in the municipality of Üçoğlan in the Agdam Rayon of Azerbaijan.
