= Gül Baharlı =

- Location within Azerbaijan Location within Karabakh Economic Region
- Coordinates: 40°06′21.2″N 47°05′02.4″E
- Country: Azerbaijan
- Rayon: Agdam
- Municipality: Üçoğlan
- Time zone: UTC+4 (AZT)
  - Summer (DST): UTC+5 (AZT)

Gül Baharlı (Gul Baharli; known as Baharlı until 2015) is a village in the municipality of Üçoğlan in the Agdam District of Azerbaijan.
