= Qasımbəyli, Agsu =

Qasımbeyli
- Location within Azerbaijan
- Coordinates: 40°32′N 48°12′E
- Country: Azerbaijan
- Rayon: Agsu
- Municipality: Ərəbmehdibəy
- Time zone: UTC+4 (AZT)
  - Summer (DST): UTC+5 (AZT)

Qasımbeyli (also, Kasumbeyli and Kasymbeyli) is a village in the Agsu Rayon of Azerbaijan. The village forms part of the municipality of Ərəbmehdibəy.
