= Dədəli, Fuzuli =

Dədəli
- Location within Azerbaijan Location within Karabakh Economic Region
- Coordinates: 39°34′55″N 47°09′48″E
- Country: Azerbaijan
- District: Fuzuli
- Time zone: UTC+4 (AZT)

Dədəli (also, Dadaly and Dedeli) is a village in the Fuzuli District of Azerbaijan. The village was occupied by Armenian forces during the First Nagorno-Karabakh War, but was recaptured by Azerbaijan on 17 October 2020.
