= Qasımbəyli, Jalilabad =

Qasımbəyli is a village and municipality in the Jalilabad Rayon of Azerbaijan. It has a population of 229.
