= Dedeli, Valandovo =

Dedeli Дедели
- Village
- Location within North Macedonia
- Coordinates: 41.283559°N 22.605345°E
- Country: North Macedonia
- Region: Southeastern
- Municipality: Valandovo

Population (2021)
  - Total: 252
- Time zone: UTC+1 (CET)
  - Summer (DST): UTC+2 (CEST)
- Website: .

Dedeli (Macedonian: Дедели) is a village in the municipality of Valandovo, North Macedonia.

== Demographics ==
According to the 2002 census, the village had a total of 220 inhabitants. Ethnic groups in the village include:

- Turks 212
- Romani 3
- Others 5

As of 2021, the village of Dedeli has 252 inhabitants and the ethnic composition was the following:

- Turks – 236
- Macedonian – 1
- Person without Data - 15
