= Qasımbəyli, Barda =

Qasımbəyli
- Municipality
- Location within Azerbaijan Location within Karabakh Economic Region
- Coordinates: 40°22′03″N 47°04′38″E
- Country: Azerbaijan
- Rayon: Barda

Population
  - Total: 748
- Time zone: UTC+4 (AZT)
  - Summer (DST): UTC+5 (AZT)

Qasımbəyli (also, Qasimbəyli, Kasumbegly, and Kasymbeyli) is a village and municipality in the Barda Rayon of Azerbaijan. It has a population of 748.
