= Martuni Province =

Province of the Republic of Artsakh (1991–2023)

Coordinates: 39.7953°N 47.1131°E

Martuni Մարտունի
- Province
- Xocəvənd
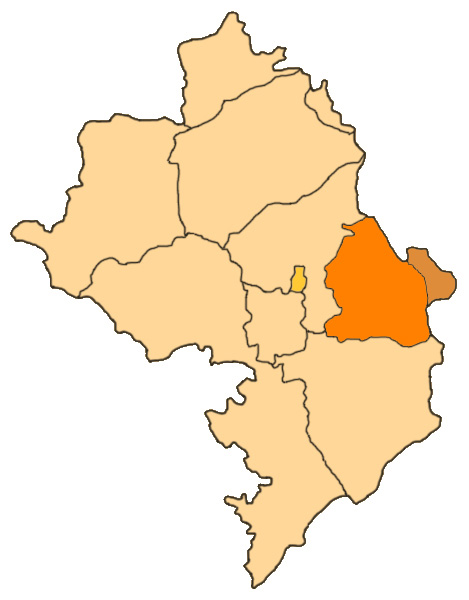
- Capital: Martuni

Government
  - Governor: Nelson Soghomonyan

Area
  - Total: 951 km^{2} (367 sq mi)
  - Rank: Ranked 6th

Population (2015)
  - Total: 24,300
  - Rank: Ranked 2nd
  - Density: 25.6/km^{2} (66.2/sq mi)
- Website: Martuni Region

Martuni Province (Armenian: Մարտունու շրջան, Russian: Мартунинский район) was a province of the breakaway Republic of Artsakh, which came under the control of Azerbaijan in 2023. Following the dissolution of the Soviet Union, the territory experienced subsequent conflicts, before Azerbaijan re-established full sovereignty over the area. Geographically, the district is characterized by a varied landscape typical of the Karabakh region, which includes mountainous and foothill areas. The climate can vary depending on elevation, ranging from temperate to cooler conditions in higher altitudes. Demographically, the population composition has undergone significant changes over time due to conflicts and displacement.

== History ==
The territory that constitutes the modern Martuni Province was part of the Soviet-era raion of Martuni District within the former Nagorno-Karabakh Autonomous Oblast in the Azerbaijani Soviet Socialist Republic. In 1991, the Azerbaijani parliament, with the Law on Abolishment of Nagorno-Karabakh Autonomous Oblast, abolished the Martuni District and forcibly consolidated its territory into the neighboring Khojavend District. Following the First Karabakh War in the early 1990s, much of the territory, including the area of Martuni, came under the control of the Republic of Artsakh. After the 2020 Karabakh War and the 2023 Azerbaijani offensive, Azerbaijan reasserted its full sovereignty and control over these territories.

== Geography ==
The Martuni District is located in the Karabakh Economic Region of Azerbaijan. The Karabakh region itself is situated in the western part of Azerbaijan, bordered by Armenia to the west. The geographical features of the Karabakh region are diverse, encompassing both mountainous and lowland areas. The Lesser Caucasus mountain range traverses parts of this region, influencing the local topography and climate. The territory has an expanse of fertile lands fed by a network of rivers. The climate in the region varies with elevation, and lowland areas experience a temperate and dry climate, while in the mountainous parts, it transitions to a cooler climate.

== Demographics ==
As of 2015, the region had a population of 24,300 as per the Azerbaijani census. The demographics of the district and the larger Karabakh region have been significantly impacted by the conflicts. Prior to 2023, the population was largely composed of ethnic Armenians. Following the events in 2023, which resulted in the displacement and migration of people to nearby Armenia. After the reassertion of Azerbaijani control in 2023, the Azerbaijani government has been working on the return of internally displaced persons to region.
