= Martakert Province =

Coordinates: 40.213745118231714°N 46.82198556552466°E

Martakert Մարտակերտ
- Province
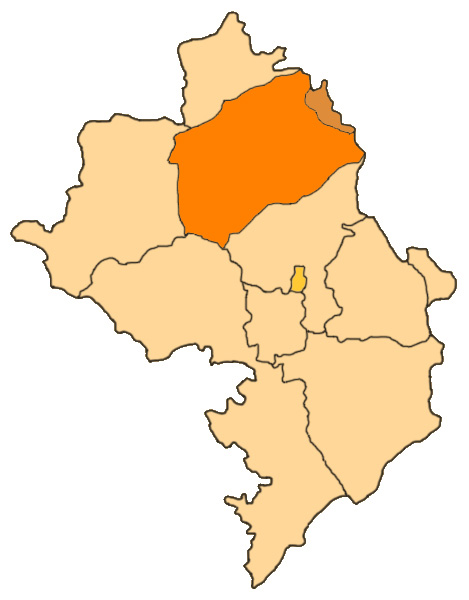
- Capital: Martakert

Government
  - Governor: Vladik Khachatryan

Area
  - Total: 1,795 km^{2} (693 sq mi)
  - Rank: Ranked 4th

Population (2013)
  - Total: 20,185
  - Rank: Ranked 3rd
  - Density: 11.25/km^{2} (29.12/sq mi)
- Website: Martakert Province

Martakert Province (Armenian: Մարտակերտի շրջան, romanized: Martakerti Shrjan) was a de facto province of the Republic of Artsakh, de jure part of the Republic of Azerbaijan. The population was of the region was mainly Armenian until their expulsion in 2023. The province contains 43 communities of which one is urban and 42 are rural.

Following the First Nagorno-Karabakh War, the district came under the control of Artsakh. However, following the Second Nagorno-Karabakh War, Azerbaijan captured parts of the province and after the 2023 Azerbaijani offensive in Nagorno-Karabakh, all of Nagorno-Karabakh came under the control of Azerbaijan.

== Historical heritage sites ==
The Gandzasar monastery, the Yeghishe Arakyal Monastery and the 17th century Armenian monastery Yerits Mankants are located in the province. The Vankasar Monastery is just outside the town of Martakert. The archaeological site of Tigranakert of Artsakh is also located in the province, thought to have been founded in the 2nd-1st century B.C, it has been undergoing excavation since 2005. Some of the walls of the city, with Hellenistic-style towers, as well as Armenian basilicas dating to fifth to seventh centuries have been uncovered.

== Education ==
In 2022, Armath Airborne engineering lab was launched in the province, it provides students 14 and above to create UAVs. This was intended as a broader project focusing on regional security.

== Gallery ==
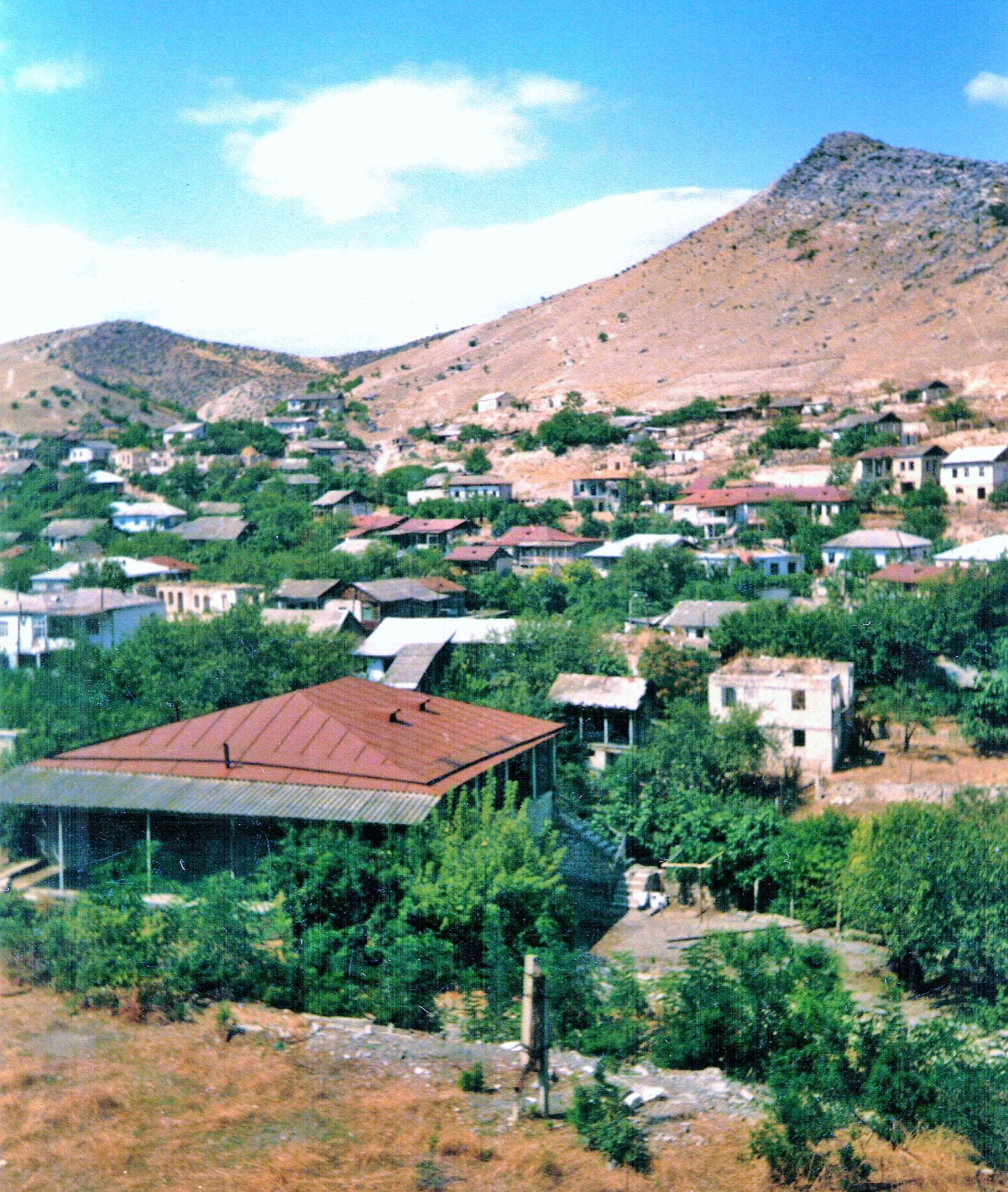
A view of the town of Martakert

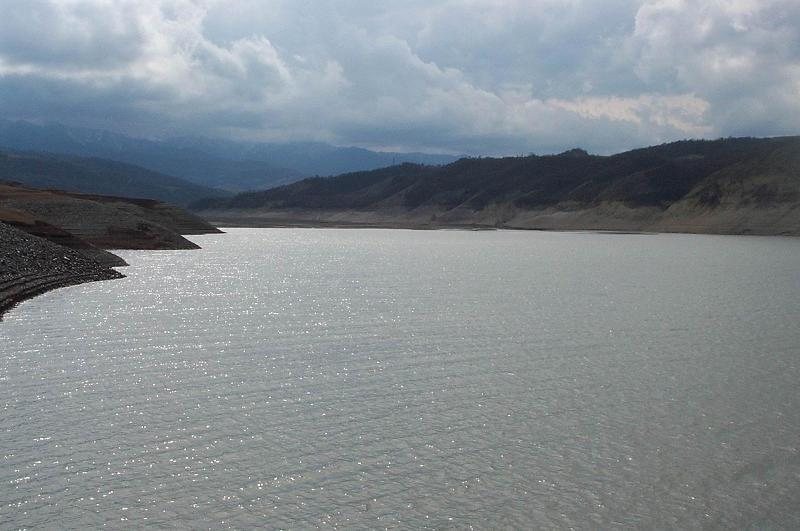
The Sarsang reservoir

== See also ==
- Surp Hovhannes Mkrtich Church
