= Shushi Province =

Coordinates: 39.7583°N 46.7483°E

Shushi Շուշի
- Province
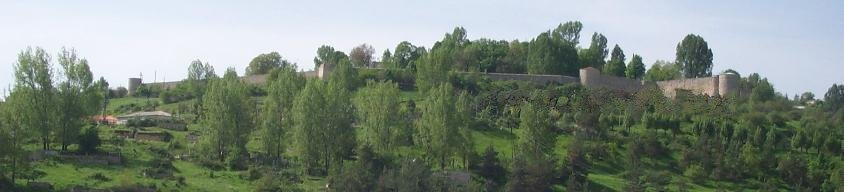
- Old city walls of Shushi

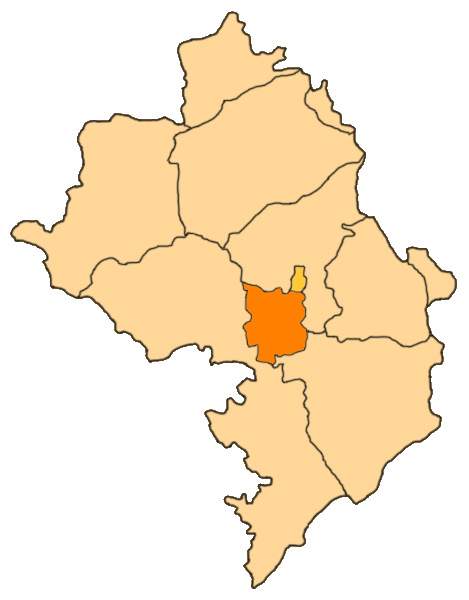
- Capital: Shushi (nominal)

Government
  - Governor: Vladimir Kasyan

Area
  - Total: 383 km^{2} (148 sq mi)
  - Rank: Ranked 7th

Population (2013)
  - Total: 5,599
  - Rank: Ranked 7th
  - Density: 14.6/km^{2} (37.9/sq mi)
- Postal code: AZ 5800

Shushi Province (Armenian: Շուշիի շրջան) was a province of the breakaway Republic of Artsakh. The province had 7 communities of which 1 is considered urban and 6 are rural. The town of Shushi (Shusha) and Karin Tak came under control of Azerbaijan after the 2020 Battle of Shusha.

== Sites of interest ==
- Shushi, its largest community
- The "rock" of Shushi, below which is the village of Karin Tak (Քարին Տակ; Under the Rock). The "rock" is prominent in Armenian history as it was from there that Armenian fighters ambushed the Armenian military who were held in Shushi during the First Artsakh
- Ghazanchetsots Cathedral, 1868–1887
- The Shushi Tank Memorial
- The church of Kanach Zham (Կանաչ Ժամ եկեղեցի), 1847
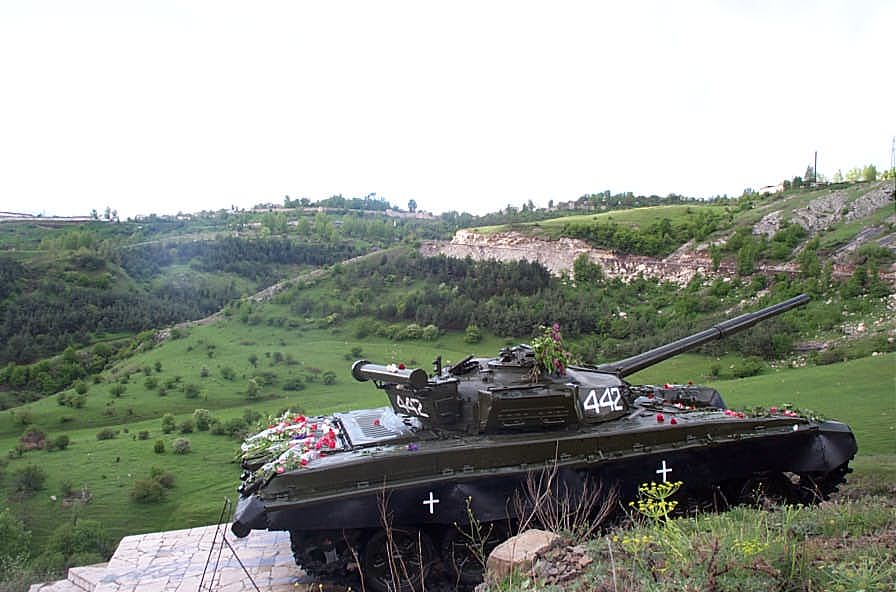
The Shushi tank memorial

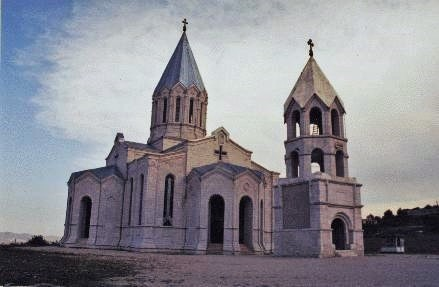
Ghazanchetsots Cathedral
