= Aghdam District =

District in western Azerbaijan

Coordinates: 39°59′01″N 46°55′43″E

- District
- Azerbaijani: Ağdam rayonu
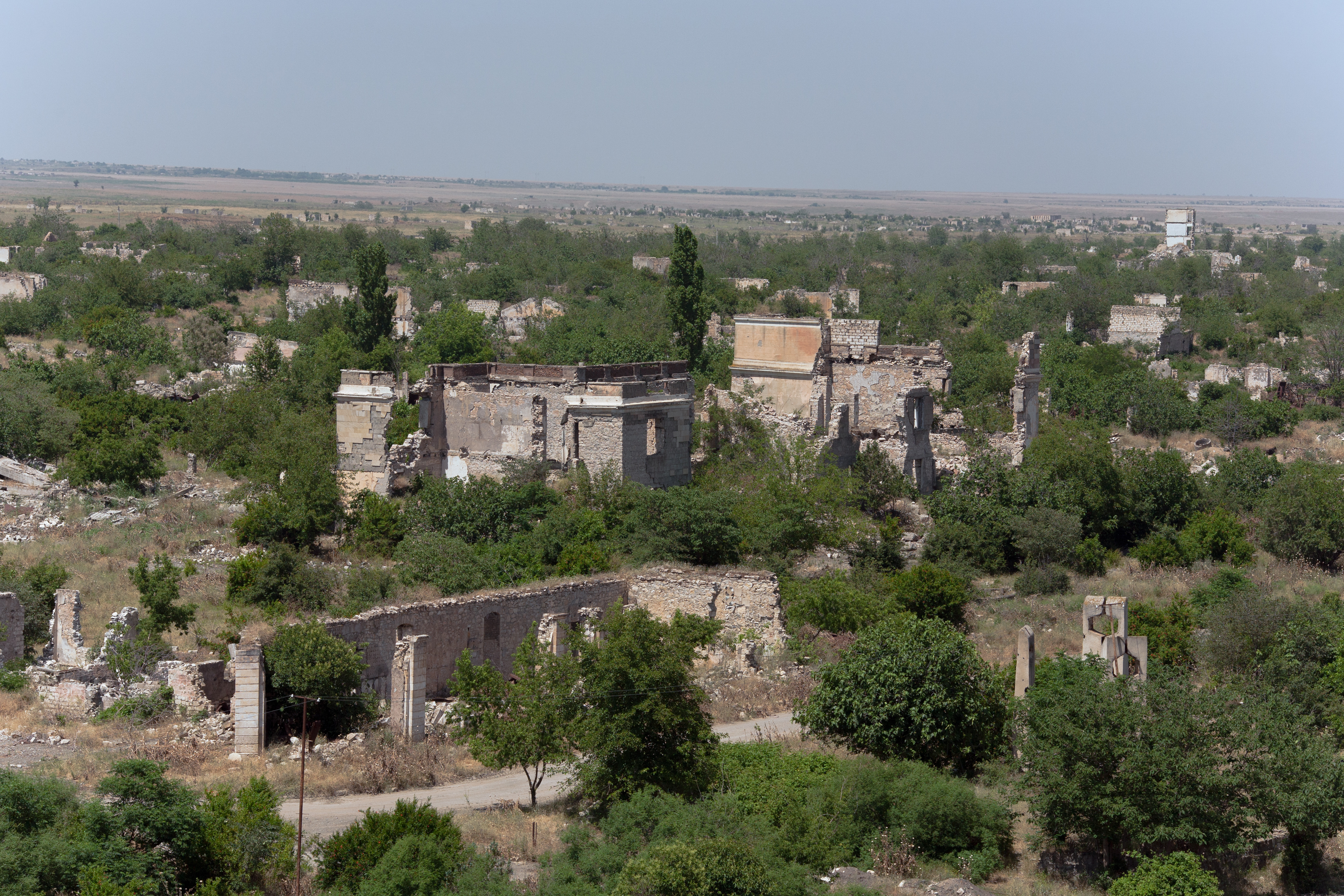

- Map of Azerbaijan showing Aghdam District
- Country: Azerbaijan
- Region: Karabakh
- Established: 8 August 1930
- Capital: Aghdam
- Settlements: 138

Government
  - Governor: Vagif Hasanov
  - Special representative: Emin Huseynov

Area
  - Total: 1,150 km^{2} (440 sq mi)

Population (2020)
  - Total: 204,000
  - Density: 177/km^{2} (459/sq mi)
- Time zone: UTC+4 (AZT)
- Postal code: 0200
- Website: agdam-ih.gov.az

Aghdam District (Azerbaijani: Ağdam rayonu) is one of the 66 administrative divisions of Azerbaijan. It is located in the west of the country and belongs to the Karabakh Economic Region. The district borders the districts of Khojaly, Kalbajar, Tartar, Khojavend, Aghjabadi, and Barda. Its capital is Aghdam. As of 2020, the district had a nominal population of 204,000.

Most of the territory of the district was under the occupation of Armenian forces following the First Nagorno-Karabakh War in the early 1990s. However, as part of the 2020 Nagorno-Karabakh ceasefire agreement which ended the 2020 Nagorno-Karabakh War, the city of Aghdam and the surrounding district were returned to Azerbaijani control on 20 November 2020. Prior to the city's return to Azerbaijani control, the de facto capital of the district was Quzanlı.

== History ==
There are different opinions about the origin of the name Aghdam. According to some sources, the word "Ağdam" means "white castle" in old Turkic. According to this version, Turkic-speaking tribes living in this region in the distant past built small fortresses mainly to defend themselves. Over time, the meaning of the name of the city changed. In the first half of the 18th century, the founder of the Karabakh khanate, Panahali khan, ordered that a white stone building be built for him in this city. For a long time, this building became a kind of icon for the inhabitants of the surrounding villages. In this sense, "Aghdam" means a white house illuminated by the sun's rays. Aghdam was founded in the middle of the 18th century. It was the site of Panah Ali khan Javanshir's summer palace and Javanshir family burial ground. In 1828, it received city status in Shusha Uyezd of Elisabethpol Governorate. During the Soviet era, Aghdam had many industries such as butter, wine, brandy and silk factories, as well as hardware and tool factories. An airport and two train stations served there. In terms of education, Aghdam had technical, agricultural, medical and music schools.

It was occupied by the Artsakh Defense Army with the support of the Armenian Armed Forces on 23 July 1993, with the settlement being completely destroyed and the population of the city being expelled to the east, into Azerbaijan.

Aghdam, located in the buffer zone between the Armenian and Azerbaijani forces, then looked like a ghost town. It was founded in the 18th century and received city status in 1928. It is 365 km away from Baku. In accordance with the ceasefire agreement signed between Azerbaijan and Armenia on 10 November 2020, the entire Aghdam District passed under the control of Azerbaijan on 20 November 2020. At the 2008 census, its population was 39,900 people.

== Population ==
The district had 108,554 people in 1979. Population rose to 131,293 in 1989, of whom 28,000 lived in the town of Aghdam and over 103,000 in villages and other rural areas.

Following Aghdam's capture following Battle of Aghdam, all of Azerbaijani residents in Armenian-occupied areas were forced to flee. According to the Azerbaijani census of 2009, the nominal population of the district was 175,400. (Note: The population of Armenian-occupied part of Aghdam was calculated based on the IDPs)

=== Internally displaced people ===
Internally displaced people from Nagorno-Karabakh and surrounding occupied regions were moved to Aghdam district from tent settlements around the country. They live in new houses built by the government.

== Villages ==
- Həsənçobanlı
