= Xəlfəli, Shusha =

Xəlfəli
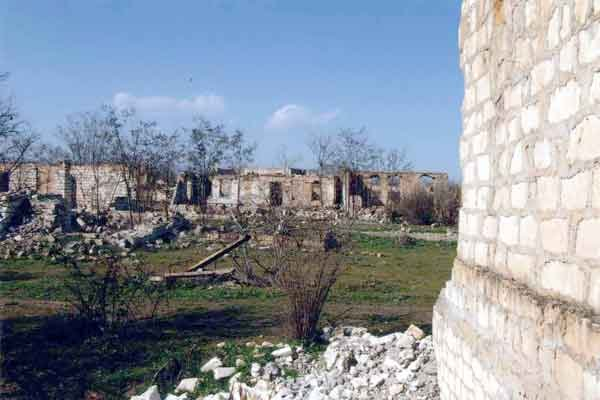

- Location within Azerbaijan Location within Karabakh Economic Region
- Coordinates: 39°46′01″N 46°40′59″E
- Country: Azerbaijan
- District: Shusha
- Time zone: UTC+4 (AZT)

Khalfali (Azerbaijani: Xəlfəli) is a village located in Shusha District of Azerbaijan, and as well it is the center of the Khalfali rural administrative-territorial district.

== Geography ==
The village of Khalfali is the center of the Khalfali rural administrative-territorial district of Shusha district, while this rural administrative-territorial district also includes the villages of Armudlu, Dukanlar, Garabulag, Lachinlar, Mirzalar, Shushulu, Zamanpayasi. The village is located at an altitude of 1260 m on the bank of the Khalfalichay River, which flows into the Karkarchay River. It is located in the northern part of the Shusha district, just 4 km west of the regional center of Shusha.

== History ==
During the Soviet period, the village was part of the Shusha district, which in turn was part of the Nagorno-Karabakh Autonomous Region (NKAR) of Azerbaijan SSR.

As a result of the Karabakh conflict, the village was occupied by Armenian Armed Forces in 1992.

According to the Trilateral Statement signed on the night of 9–10 November 2020, following the results of the Second Karabakh War, the village came under the control of the Russian Peacekeeping Forces.

As a result of the military operations carried out by the Armed Forces of Azerbaijan in Karabakh on 19–20 September 2023, the village was returned under the control of Azerbaijan.

== Population ==
Before the Karabakh War, the village had an exclusively Azerbaijani population. According to the Caucasian calendar of 1912, 1 389 people lived in the village mostly Azerbaijanis listed as "Tatars". According to the 1921 census, 1 073 Azerbaijanis lived in the village listed as "Azerbaijani Turks". According to the data for 1986, 126 Azerbaijanis lived in the village.
