= Yeghtsahogh =

Yeghtsahogh / Sarybaba Եղցահող / Sarıbaba
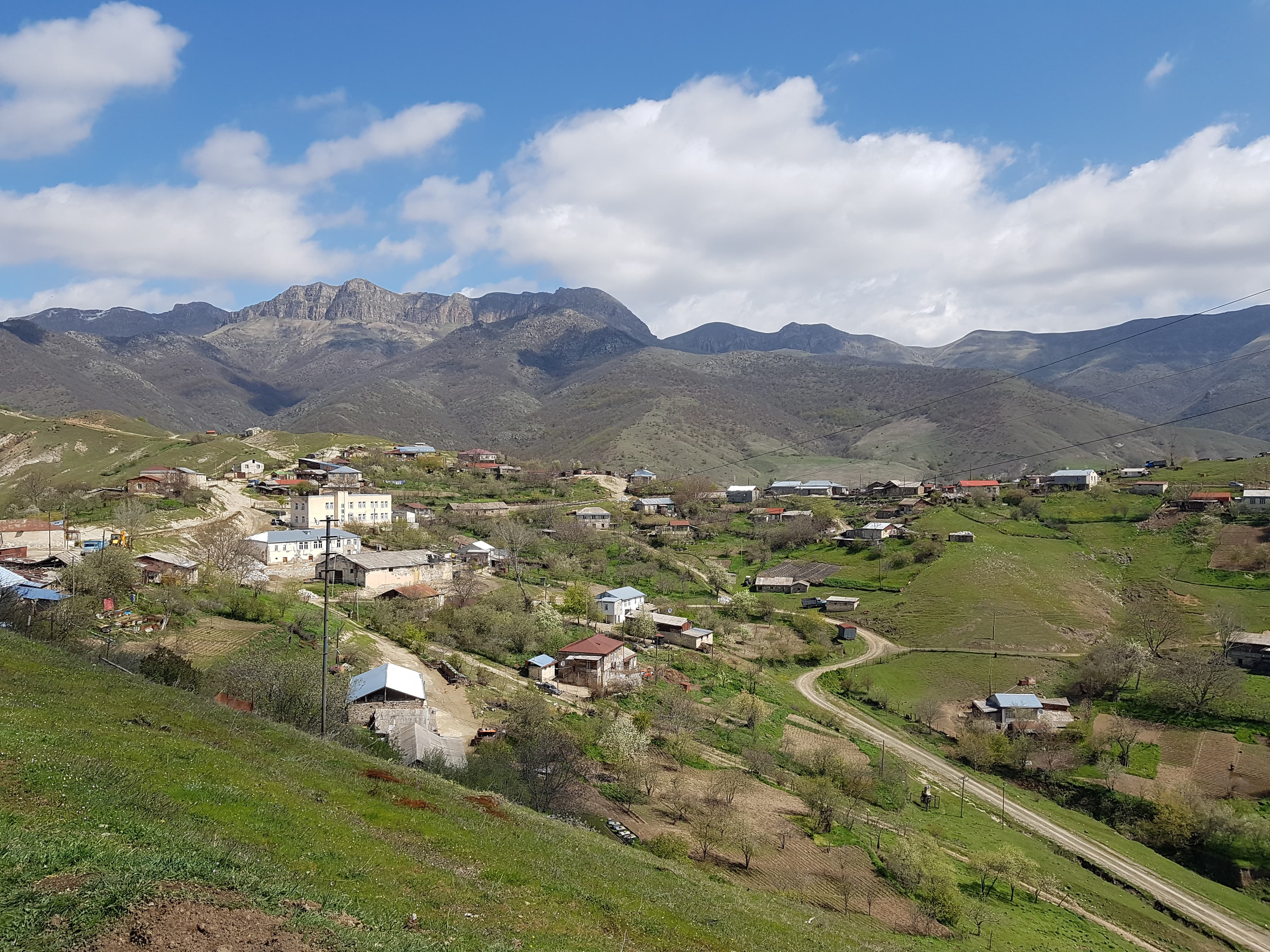

- Location within Azerbaijan
- Coordinates: 39°40′38″N 46°35′15″E
- Country: Azerbaijan
  - District: Shusha

Population (2015)
  - Total: 118
- Time zone: UTC+4

Yeghtsahogh (Armenian: Եղցահող; Azerbaijani: Yextsahoğ) or Sarybaba (Azerbaijani: Sarıbaba) is a village located in the Shusha District of Azerbaijan, in the disputed region of Nagorno-Karabakh. Until 2023 it was controlled by the breakaway Republic of Artsakh. The village had an ethnic Armenian-majority population until the expulsion of the Armenian population of Nagorno-Karabakh by Azerbaijan following the 2023 Azerbaijani offensive in Nagorno-Karabakh.

== History ==
During the Soviet period, the village was part of the Shusha District of the Nagorno-Karabakh Autonomous Oblast of Azerbaijan Soviet Socialist Republic.

In the context of the 2023 Azerbaijani offensive in Nagorno-Karabakh, the Artsakh village head Davit Davtyan of the neighboring village of Mets Shen stated that the population of Yeghtsahogh had been evacuated to Mets Shen and that Yeghtsahogh had been "razed to the ground" by the Azerbaijani Armed Forces.

== Historical heritage sites ==
Historical heritage sites in and around the village include a cemetery from between the 17th and 19th centuries, an 18th-century spring monument, the 18th/19th-century church of Surb Astvatsatsin (Armenian: Սուրբ Աստվածածին, lit. 'Holy Mother of God'), an 18th/19th-century shrine, and the church of Surb Sargis (Armenian: Սուրբ Սարգիս) built in 2003.

== Economy and culture ==
The population is mainly engaged in agriculture and animal husbandry. As of 2015, the village has a municipal building, a house of culture, a secondary school, and a medical centre. The Yeghtsahogh branch of the Shushi Children's Music School is also located in the village. The Yeghtsahogh community includes the villages of Kanach Tala and Tasy Verst.

== Demographics ==
The village had 132 inhabitants in 2005, and 118 inhabitants in 2015.
