= Davit Ananun =

Armenian historian (1880–1942)

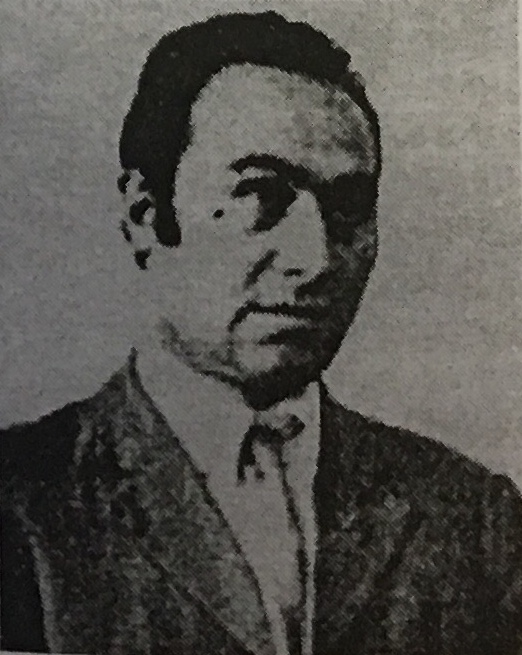
- Born: Davit Hovhannesi Ter-Danielyan; March 2, 1880; Mets Shen, Elisabethpol Governorate, Russian Empire
- Died: 1943; Astrakhan, RSFSR, Soviet Union
- Political party: Armenian Social-Democratic Labour Organization

Davit Ananun (Armenian: Դավիթ Անանուն; March 2, 1880 – 1942) was the pen name of Davit Ter-Danielyan (Ananun means "anonymous" in Armenian), an early twentieth-century Armenian historian, journalist, and socialist activist. He was one of the main leaders and ideologues of the Armenian Social-Democratic Labour Organization (also known as the Specifists).

== Biography ==
Davit Hovhannesi Ter-Danielyan was born in 1880 in the region of Nagorno-Karabakh, in the village of Mets Shen in the Elisabethpol Governorate of the Russian Empire. He was the youngest child of his family and had two sisters and one brother. He was sent to study at the Shushi Real School, although he was unable to continue his education further due to his family's financial difficulties.

After finishing school, Ananun went to Baku, where he worked at the office of an oil refinery in Balaxanı starting in 1898. From September 1908 to July 1918, he worked as a secretary at the workers' injury bureau attached to the Baku Oil Producers' Council.

Ananun was a supporter of the Armenian Revolutionary Federation in his student years and became a member of the party after moving to Baku. He remained in the party until about 1903, when he left due to his disagreement with the party's refusal to participate in the growing workers' movement in the Russian Empire. He was then a member of the Social Democratic Hunchakian Party from mid-1903 to late-1905.

After leaving the Hunchakian Party's ranks, he joined the Armenian Social-Democratic Labour Organization. In a short amount of time, Ananun became one of the party's leaders and chief ideologues.

Ananun gained prominence as an author for the Armenian press. He wrote for and edited various newspapers, where he published articles about socialism, workers' conditions, and socioeconomic developments, among other subjects, and also published translations of foreign literature and poetry. In 1916 he published the first volume of his most notable work titled Social Development of the Russian Armenians (Armenian: Ռուսահայերի հասարակական զարգացումը, romanized: Ṛusahayeri hasarakakan zargatsʻumě), the second and third volumes of which were published in 1922 and 1926, respectively.

During the inter-ethnic violence in Baku in March 1918, Ananun headed a humanitarian relief commission. In July 1918, he left Baku with a group of comrades. He was arrested by the Bolshevik authorities in the North Caucasus, but was released thanks to Vahan Terian's efforts, after which he went to Tiflis and then to Karabakh. In June 1919, he went to Yerevan, where he worked at the Immigration and Reconstruction Department of the newly independent Republic of Armenia and reassembled the Armenian Social-Democratic Labour Organization as an opposition party in Armenia. Ananun was also the president of a compatriotic union of Karabakh Armenians and actively called for the unification of Karabakh with independent Armenia.

After the establishment of Soviet rule in Armenia in December 1920, unlike many other members of the Armenian Social-Democratic Labour Organization, Ananun was not arrested, likely due to his relationship with the influential Armenian Bolshevik (and former Specifist) Ashot Hovhannisian.

After a brief stint in a minor position at the People's Commissariat for Food Supplies of Soviet Armenia, Ananun resumed his scholarly activities at the Etchmiatsin Cultural-Historical Institute (predecessor of the Matenadaran). In February 1923 he was appointed administrator of the Museum of the Revolution of Soviet Armenia. Following the death of Alexander Miasnikian in 1925, the position of former Specifists in Armenia became increasingly precarious. Ananun was dismissed from his position at the Museum of the Revolution in November 1926. In July 1927, he was arrested in Tiflis, and ten days later the leader of Soviet Armenia Hayk Ovsepyan published an article calling Ananun "a sworn enemy of Soviet power in Armenia". In April 1928, he was sentenced to three years exile by special decision of the OGPU. Davit Ananun spent the next fifteen years in imposed exile in different parts of the RSFSR. He died in a prison camp in Astrakhan in 1943.
