= Tasy Verst =

Tasy Verst / Onverst Տասը Վերստ / Onverst
- Location within Azerbaijan Location within Karabakh Economic Region
- Coordinates: 39°40′25″N 46°36′16″E
- Country: Azerbaijan
  - District: Shusha

Population (2015)
  - Total: 4
- Time zone: UTC+4

Tasy Verst (Armenian: Տասը Վերստ), Tsaghkadzor (Armenian: Ծաղկաձոր; Azerbaijani: Saxkadzor) or Onverst is a village located in the Shusha District of Azerbaijan, in the disputed region of Nagorno-Karabakh.

== Toponymy ==
The village was renamed from Tsaghkadzor/Saxkadzor to Onverst in 1999 by the Azerbaijani government.

== History ==
During the Soviet period, the village was a part of the Shusha District of the Nagorno-Karabakh Autonomous Oblast.

== Economy and culture ==
The population is mainly engaged in agriculture and animal husbandry. The village is a part of the community of Yeghtsahogh.

== Demographics ==
The village has an Armenian-majority population, had 15 inhabitants in 2005, and 4 inhabitants in 2015.
