= Kanach Tala, Nagorno-Karabakh =

Village in Shusha, Azerbaijan

Kanach Tala / Goytala Կանաչ Թալա / Göytala
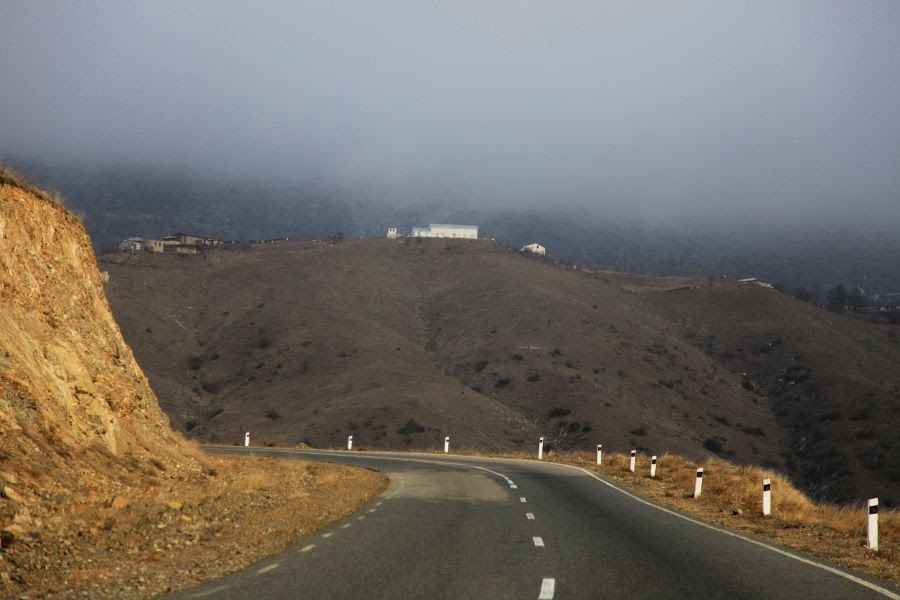
- On the road towards the village

- Location within Azerbaijan
- Coordinates: 39°40′41.9″N 46°36′54.5″E
- Country: Azerbaijan
  - District: Shusha

Population (2015)
  - Total: 16
- Time zone: UTC+4

Kanach Tala (Armenian: Կանաչ Թալա) or Goytala (Azerbaijani: Göytala) is a village located in the Shusha District of Azerbaijan, in the disputed region of Nagorno-Karabakh. The village had an Azerbaijani-majority population before they fled the fighting of the First Nagorno-Karabakh War.

== History ==
During the Soviet period, the village was part of the Shusha District of the Nagorno-Karabakh Autonomous Oblast.

== Historical heritage sites ==
Historical heritage sites in and around the village include tombs from the 2nd–1st millennia BCE, a 12th/13th-century village, and a 19th-century cemetery.

== Economy and culture ==
The population is mainly engaged in agriculture and animal husbandry. The village is a part of the community of Yeghtsahogh.

== Demographics ==
The village had 9 inhabitants in 2005, and 16 inhabitants in 2015.
