= Khanali =

Khanali may refer to:

- Xanalı, Azerbaijan
- Xanlıqpəyə, Azerbaijan
