= Xanalılar =

Xanalılar or Xanalı or Xanali or Khanali may refer to:

- Xanalı, a village in the Shusha District of Azerbaijan
- Xanalılar, a village in the Lachin District of Azerbaijan
