= Xəlfəli =

Xəlfəli or Khalfali may refer to:

- Xəlfəli, Imishli, Azerbaijan
- Xəlfəli, Sabirabad, Azerbaijan
- Xəlfəli, Shusha, Azerbaijan
