= Həsənabad, Shusha =

Village in Shusha, Azerbaijan

Həsənabad
- Location within Azerbaijan Location within Karabakh Economic Region
- Country: Azerbaijan
- District: Shusha
- Time zone: UTC+4 (AZT)

Həsənabad (also, Hasanabad) is a village in the Shusha District of Azerbaijan.
