= Nağılar =

Nağılar or Nagilar may refer to:

- Nağılar, Gadabay, a village in the Gadabay District of Azerbaijan
- Nağılar, Shusha, a village in the Shusha District of Azerbaijan
