= Shusha fortress =

Shusha fortress / Shushi fortress
- Şuşa qalası Շուշիի բերդ قلعه شوش
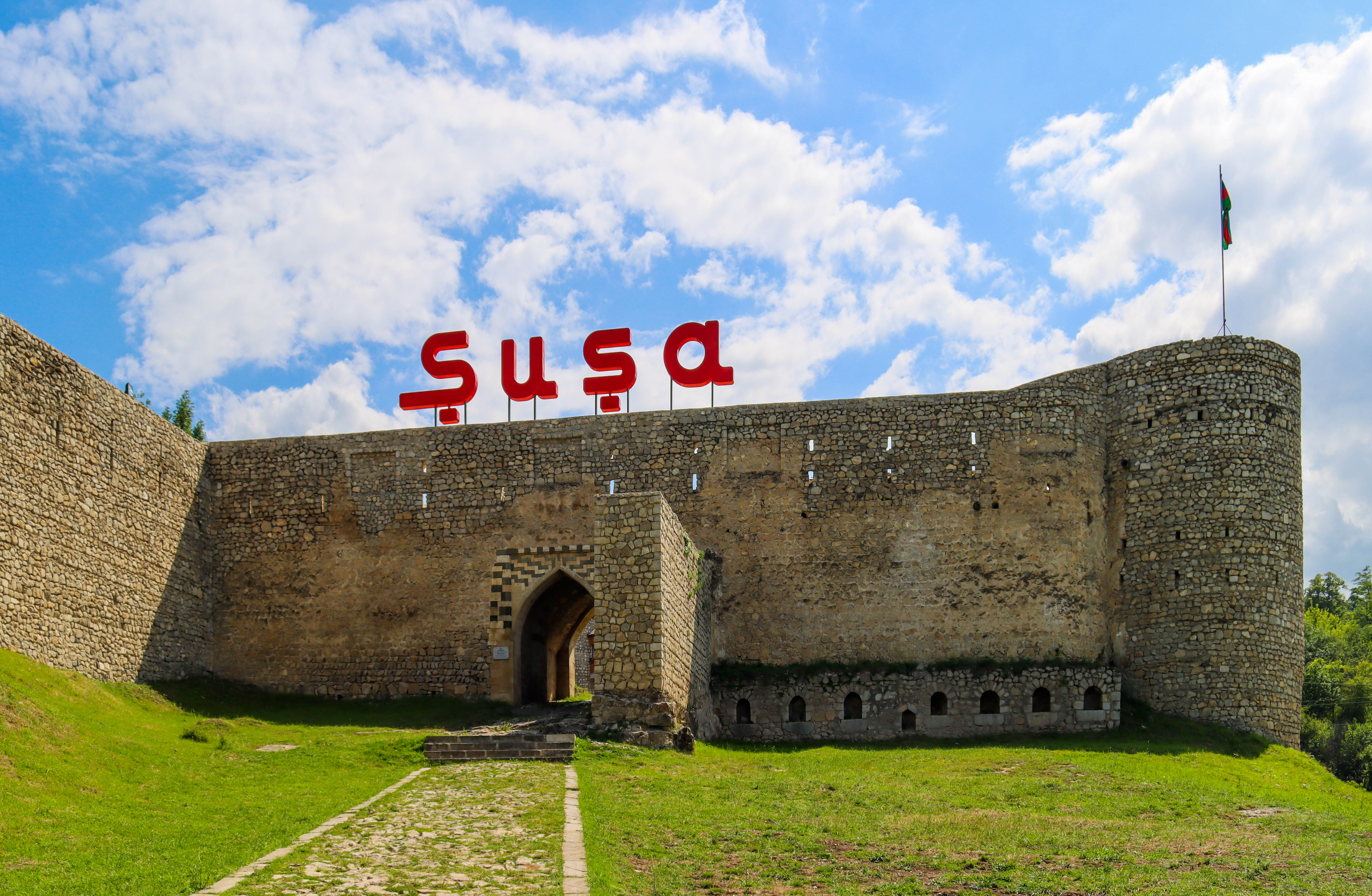
- Front of the Shusha gate with Ganja Gate sign, located in the north of the fortress walls
- Interactive map of the Shusha fortress / Shushi fortress area

General information
- Type: Fortification
- Location: Shusha, Azerbaijan
- Coordinates: 39°45′58″N 46°45′04″E
- Completed: c. 1751
- Owner: Karabakh Khanate
- Landlord: Panah Ali Khan

The Shusha fortress (Azerbaijani: Şuşa qalası, Persian: قلعه شوش) or Shushi fortress (Armenian: Շուշիի բերդ) is a fortress surrounding the historical centre of Shusha. The newly conquered castle town was called "Panahabad fortress" named after Panah Ali Khan who together with Melik Shahnazar was the founder of the fort. In later years, the city was just called "Fortress". A settlement at Shusha is first recorded in a 15th-century illustrated Armenian gospel which mentions the "Shushu village".

The area where the Shusha fortress was built is a mountainous plateau in the form of amphitheater from the west with numerous hills and rifts. The highest area of plateau is 1600 metres and the lowest area is 1300 metres above sea level. At present, the territory of Shusha city consists of plateau with a hill located lengthwise in its center. The architecture of Shusha fortress represents basic principles of architecture of feudal period in terms of both the choice of location, structural planning and the artistic appearance of the fort.

Shusha fortress had three main gates: Ganja Gate, Iravan Gate and Aghoghlan Gate. The names of all these gates are often mentioned in historical sources, as well as in all the drawn plans of 19th-century Shusha.

== History ==
=== Historical and political situation ===
Following the assassination of Nader Shah (r. 1736–1747) in 1747, internal chaos erupted in Iran, particularly in the South Caucasus, where semi-autonomous khanates emerged as a result of the lack of a centralized government, one of them being the Karabakh Khanate. Each of these khanates, which was implementing their own policies and trying to develop their economy, had a center to control the areas that was under their supervisory. This period was associated with several complicated events in the military-political history of the South Caucasus. Some of them are as follows:

1. Forty Years’ War (1709–1749) had not yet ended.

2. The wars and the uprisings of peasants in feudal society were frequent.

3. The region was being attacked by Turks and Iranians.

In such a situation, khanates were mainly in need of a well-fortified capital city because they had to maintain their territorial integrity and political independence. Therefore, the construction of such fortified cities was primarily driven by the demand of military-political situation.

Panah Ali khan who founded the Karabakh Khanate with the support of Armenian Melik Shahnazar in 1747 decided to build a fortress which would help him to control this large country extending from The Aras River to Lake Sevan, from The Tartar River to Meghri, Tatev and Sisian and including the areas of Karabakh, Zangezur and Bargushad. In 1748, Panah Ali Khan ordered to start the construction of Bayat castle near Barda. Panah Ali Khan were willing to build "a fortress where his family can live and he can protect the people in the case of invasion by enemies". Therefore, Bayat castle was surrounded by deep ditches and thick exterior walls.

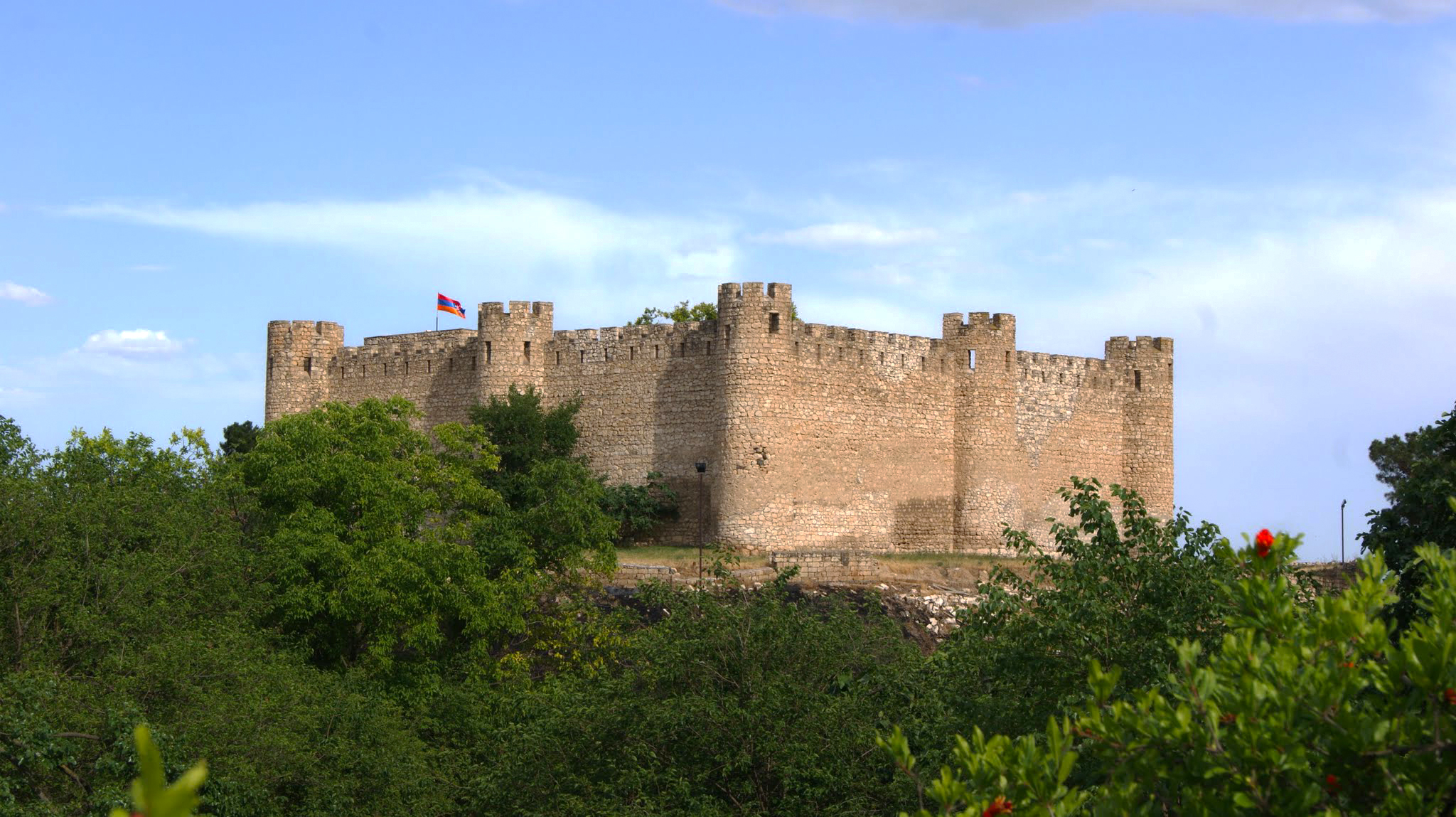
The architecture of Shahbulag Castle, which was the capital of the Karabakh Khanate before Shusha, influenced the architecture of Shusha fortress and also the towers within the fort (Photo has been taken after First Nagorno-Karabakh War).

Bayat castle, which was built with fired bricks, features Khan's palace, mosque, bazaar, bath and houses. Following the settlement of Khan's family in Bayat, artists from nearby villages as well as Ardabil and Tabriz moved here. However, Bayat did not remain as Khan's residence for a long time. Despite numerous reinforcement efforts, the castle was still weak against the attacks of foreigners. Taking into account the threat, Panah Ali Khan started to look for a strategically more favorable area to build a new fort. As a result, the area of Ternekut best known as Shahbulag, which was a foothill located near Shahbulag spring (10 km away from Aghdam), was preferred.

The 19th-century Karabakh historians stated that fortress, stone houses, mosque, bath and bazaar was built in accord with Panah Ali Khan's instructions. The information related to the construction of civil and religious buildings in Shahbulag can be found in the works of Mirza Yousif Karabakhi and Mirza Jamal Javanshir. M. J. Javanshir noted "In the section about monuments and buildings erected by the order of deceased Panal Ali Khan" in his "The History of Karabakh" book: "Shahbulag fortress, mosque near the fort, bath, other buildings and bazaar were built by the order of Panah Ali khan". The khan, who moved to a new castle and fortified his positions, instructed to destroy his former headquarters.

Construction in the area of Shahbulag, especially the architecture of castle and mosque, had a significant impact on the subsequent building process in Shusha. Almost all fortresses in Shusha used the features of the Shahbulag castle again in terms of architectural planning and the structure of volume-space. Later, however, the relatives of Panah Khan advised him to choose a safer place for the construction of a new fort and thus he decided to build Shusha fortress.

=== Construction ===
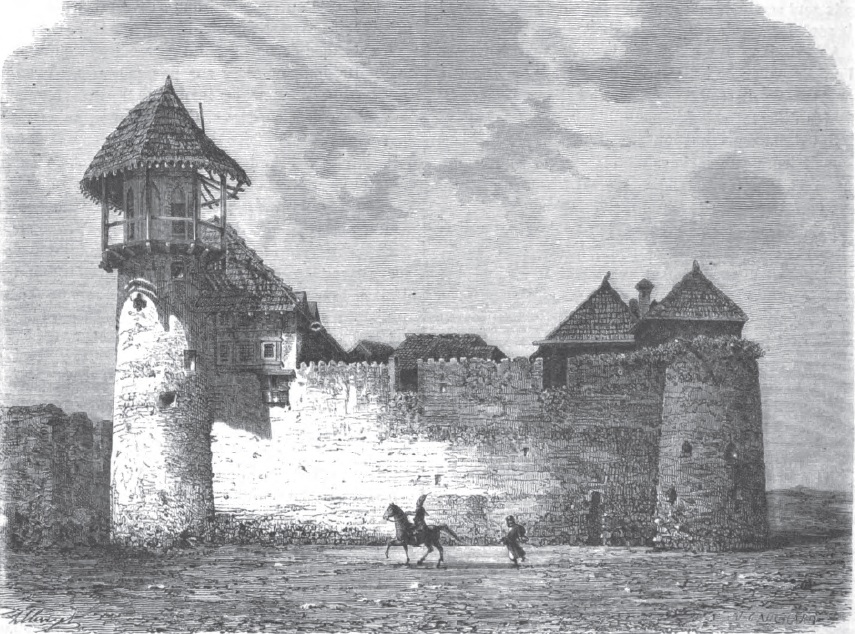
North-eastern part of Shusha fortress. Vasily Vereshchagin's painting. 1865.

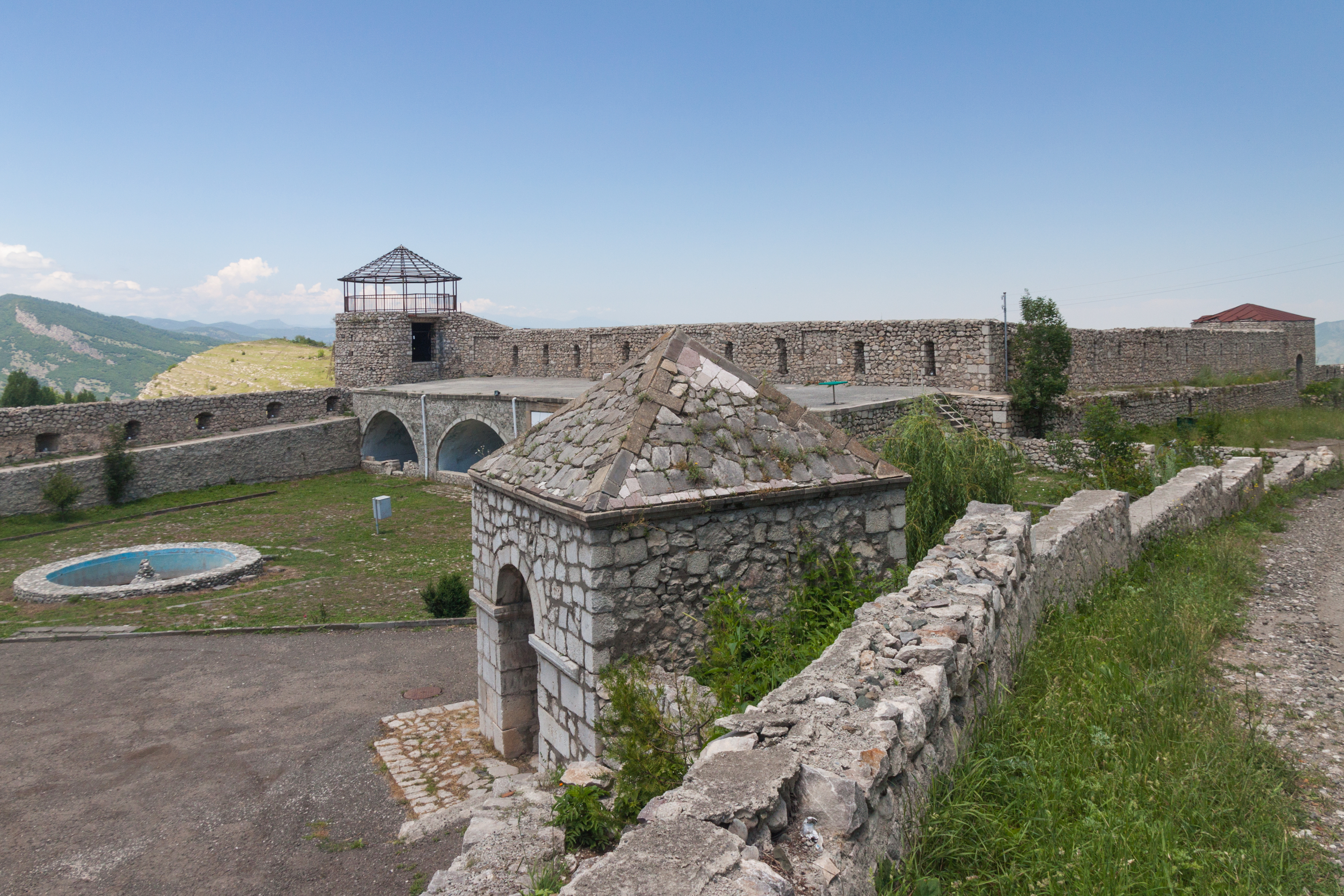
Up-to-date view of the north-eastern part of Shusha fortress (Photo has been taken after First Nagorno-Karabakh War).

Ahmad bey Javanshir noted that "The eternally impassable, inaccessible place chosen for construction of the fort would not allow even the strongest enemy to besiege it". The construction of a new fortress required such a location that one of its sides would be open to be in contact with elats as well as would provide Panah Ali Khan with a chance to get in touch with mahals under his control.

"The sole place in whole Karabakh was Shusha lowland, which was a natural fort surrounded by inaccessible rocks". Baharli, the historian of Karabakh, stated that the space selected for the construction of the new fort was surrounded all around, except the east, by dense forests. The area of the fortress is divided into the ravines completed by valleys. The ravines allow natural water to flow out of the fortress, so it reduces the possibility of flooding to zero in Shusha, where the rainy and foggy weather is characteristic.

Due to the lack of flowing water sources in Shusha plateau (except a few springs), numerous groundwater wells were drilled to meet the needs of the castle population for water. One of the most important features of the Shusha plateau was its richness of well-hewn stones used for construction and forests. All of these played an important role and had a great value as local building materials for the construction of the fortress.

Although the fortress walls were vital to the city during the continuous feudal wars, their construction required to spend a large part of the city budget. The choice of a mountainous area for the construction of the town of Shusha also allowed to save some money for the construction of the walls. Rocky cliffs caused an inaccessible environment in almost two-thirds of the defense system. Therefore, Shusha is one of the best examples of how the strategic factor influences the choice of territory.

The testimony of many witnesses proves the success of the site chosen for the construction of the fortress. G. Keppel, the famous English traveler who visited Karabakh in the 19th century, noted the successful strategic location of the Shusha plateau. He writes: "The natural superior position – the location in the almost inaccessible peak of the high hill – caused the need for human defense to play a less important role in the city." Count Platon Zubov who described Shusha fortress at the top of the Caucasus Mountains also stated its natural strategic advantage. The high cliffs surrounding the Shusha plateau on three sides – south, west and east – rise above each other in different directions and they are "completely inaccessible" from all the sides except the north. The height of the rocks surrounding the Shusha plateau even reaches up to 400 meters in some places.

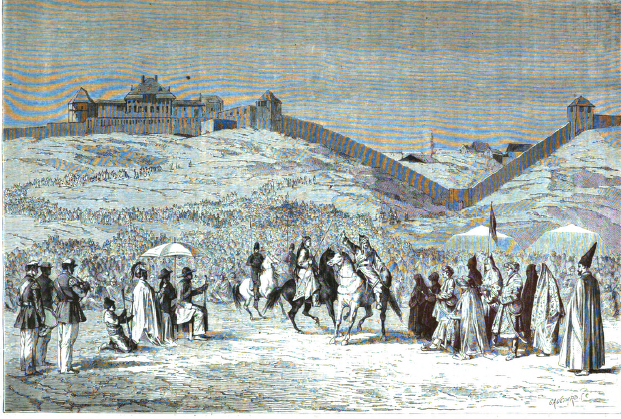
Vasily Vereshchagin – "The End of Dramatic Play", 1865. Shusha fortress and Khan palace can be seen in the background.

Russian military historian Vasily Potto described 48-day defense of Shusha against the army led by Qajar crown prince Abbas Mirza and also noted the topographical characteristics of Shusha: "The fort, which was in a dilapidated condition but impassable due to its position, was not in need of a complicated defense plan." One of the advantages of the site chosen for the construction of the fortress was the good observation and control of all the surrounding areas, which prevented a sudden attack of the enemy. P. Zubov writes: "It is possible to observe the villages, which are scattered along the valley and located on the farthest side from the perspective of Shusha plateau, beautiful vineyards and mountains covered with forests."

V. Potto and A. A. Caspari who was speaking about the natural impregnability of Shusha fortress also noted that the cliffs which rise to the top, especially in the north-eastern part of the city. They stated that due to these cliffs, "even a few people would be enough to prevent an army consisting of a large number of soldiers as in ancient Thermopylae". The road from Shusha fortress to Ganja fortress was located on the slope of the mountain. In the 1870s, the measures were taken to straighten this steep road hindering the development of the economy in Shusha. For this purpose, some rocks which was difficult to pass were destroyed by blasting. V. Vereshchagin, who visited Shusha in 1864–1865, described the difficult, steep, sloping road where five horses hardly pulled a cart.

The newly built fortress-city was named Panahabad fortress named after its founder Panah Ali Khan. Later, the city was simply called "Fortress". After a while, the people called the fortress as Shusha fortress, and later only Shusha. The name "Shusha" was probably derived from the name of Shushikend, which is near the place where the fortress was built.

There is no exact information regarding the definite date of construction of fortress. A. Alasgarzadeh and E. Shukurzadeh, who edited and published the "Karabakhname" (the important historical source to investigate the history of Karabakh Khanate), note that it is doubtful the date of the foundation of Shusha fortress was given as 1170 according to Islamic calendar. According to mentioned historians, Mirza Jamal Javanshir did not indicate the date of the foundation of the fortress correctly, and his mistake was repeated by Ahmad bey Javanshir and Mirza Adigozal bey in their own works. According to their notes, the start of the construction of Shusha fortress dates back to 1751 or the second half of 1770.

E. Avalov notes that Molla Panah Vagif, the poet and vizier of the Karabakh khan, personally supervised the construction of Shusha fortress. Karabakh historian Hasan Ali Khan Garadaghi writes: "Under the direct control of Molla Panah Vagif, several buildings including Shusha fortress were built in Shusha."

== Architectural features ==
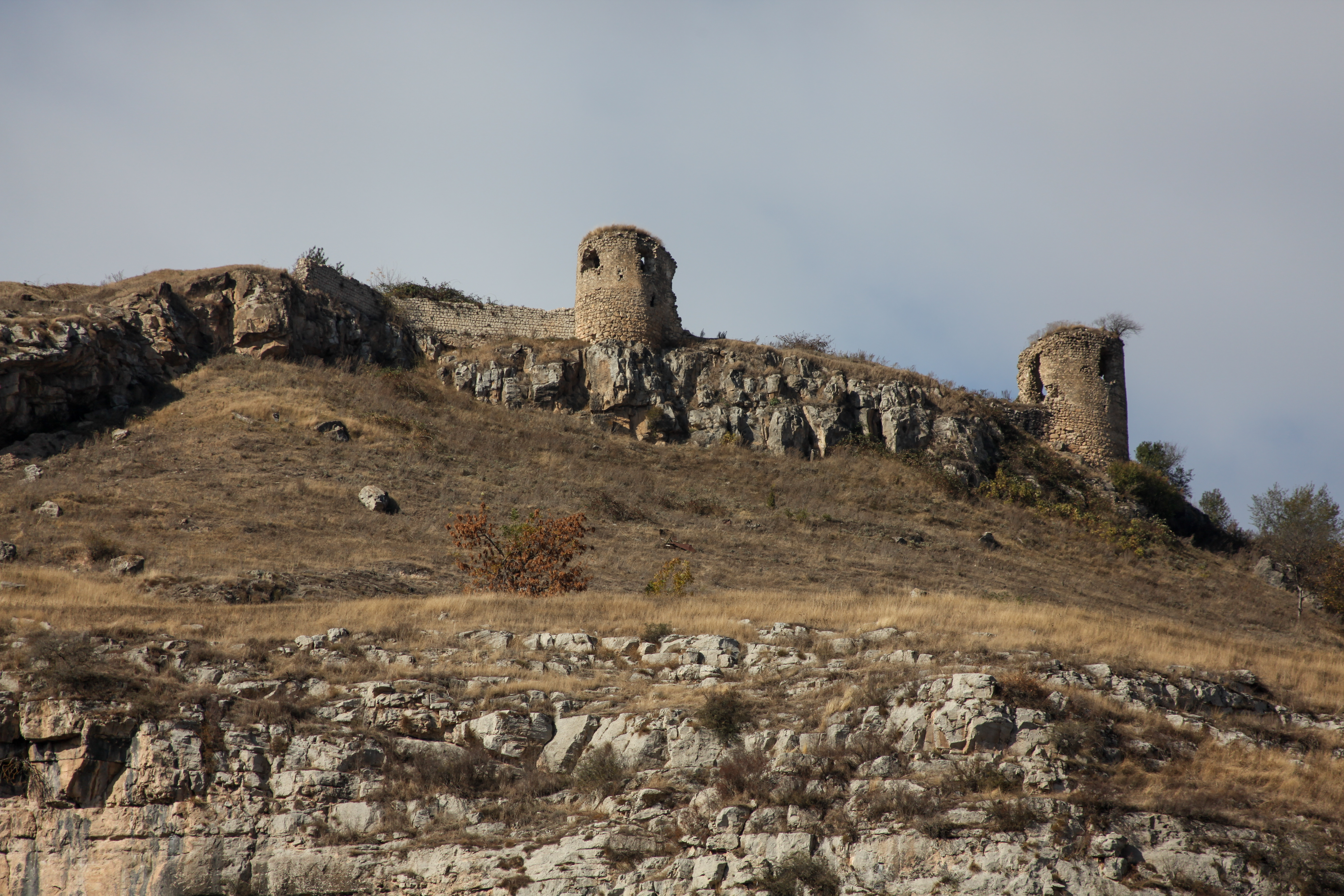
Towers of Shusha fortress.

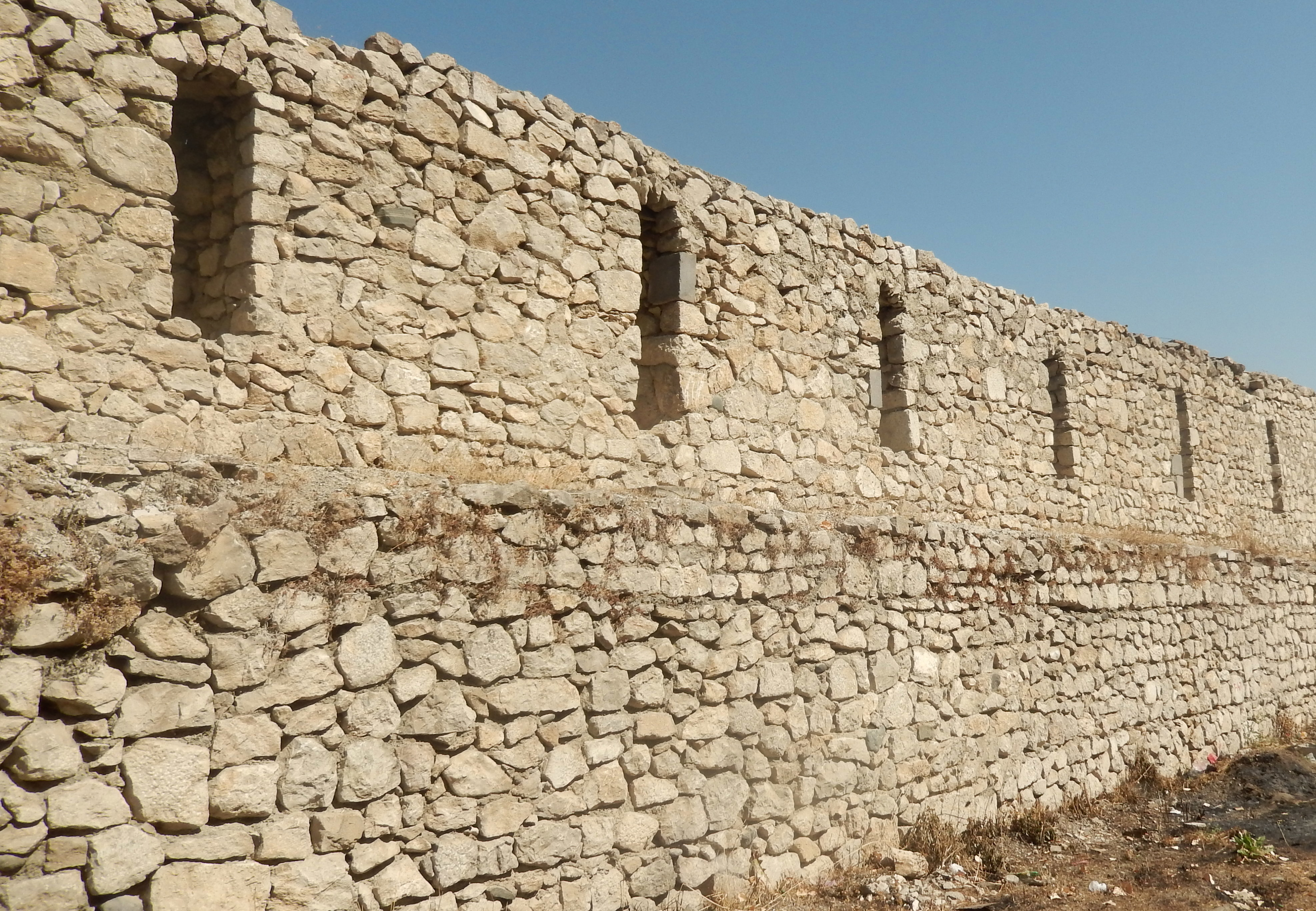
The view (from the inside) of the loopholes on the castle walls.

The area in which Shusha fortress was built is a mountainous plateau in the form of amphitheater from the west with numerous hills and rifts. The highest area of plateau is 1600 m and the lowest area is 1300 m above sea level. At present, the territory of Shusha city consists of plateau with a hill located lengthwise in its center. The plateau which turns sharply to the east reaches the hill that dominate the whole area in the west. The hill which is completed by a fault is also the center of a large amphitheater, with one wing reaching south and crossing Jidir Plain, then extends to the north from where it rounds to the south, and is completed by a ravine.

All the outer edges of Shusha plateau are sharply surrounded by hard rocks descending into Dashalticay and Khalfalichay. According to "Qafqaz" newspaper, the main reason for choosing such a unique place was related to the strategic importance that the complex mountainous area had.

At the beginning of the 18th century, on the eve of the formation of Khanates of the Caucasus, large centers of the traditional school of architecture such as Nakhchivan, Ganja, Shamakhi, were in the period of decline. In the period when Azerbaijan was divided into smaller territories, these centers of architecture lost their power of influence. New capital cities were in need of construction of palaces, castles, and forts. Therefore, feudal lords were forced to make local rural architects involve in the construction of cities. As a result, these architects had a significant impact on the architecture of new cities built in Azerbaijan in the middle of the 18th century. The main buildings of these cities are characterized by the lack of monumentality and the fact that the building materials are not well-hewn stones, which are especially observed in the buildings of Medieval Period.

At the same time, the involvement of architects who are not well known in the building process of cities had a major advantage: they were somewhat acquainted with local building materials and had certain information about how to apply them in construction. They combined the traditions of the old schools of architecture with the works of folk architects in the architecture of new cities. The most interesting syntheses of this period are observed in the architecture of Shaki and Karabakh khanates.

The architecture of Shusha fortress represents basic principles of architecture of feudal period in terms of both the choice of location, structural planning and the artistic appearance of the fort. Ahmad bey Javanshir says:

When you look up from the north-east to Shusha (from the location where 3 verst left to get there), the steep cliffs with magnificent castle walls and towers remind you of the legendary giants with crowned head.

During the construction of Shusha fortress, the architect took mainly into account the local relief, and this is also clearly seen in the plans of the city drawn in the 19th century. Therefore, the landscape of Shusha dictated the line of the castle walls and defined the boundaries of all these walls. The battle towers of Shusha fortress stick out from the surface of the walls, and even it can be said that they are built almost outside the walls, which causes the good protection of the walls. Straight walls between the towers were erected to open a fire in Shusha fortress as well as in Chirag Gala, Baku and Bughurt fortresses.

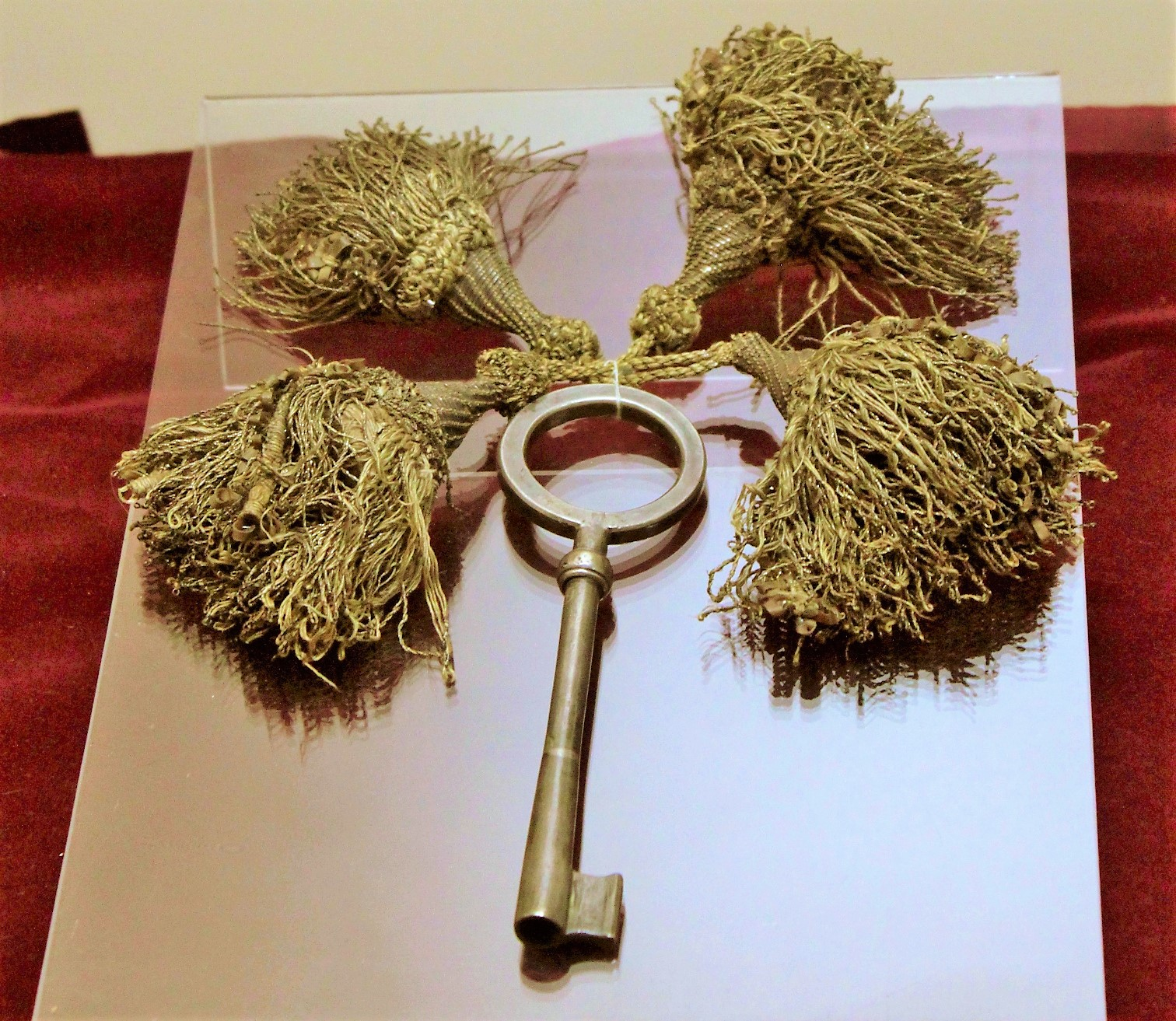
The key of the parade gate of Shusha fortress (National Museum of History of Azerbaijan).

The defensive walls of Shusha were made of stone and lime and are 2.5 km long. Mirza Yusif Nersesov and Platon Zubov noted that Shusha fortress had special loopholes. The use of artillery was also taken into account during the construction of Shusha fortress, which was a great strategic advantage. This statement was confirmed by the historian Yakhov Zakharyants who took part in the defense of Shusha fortress in the late 18th century: "At 6.00 a.m., after the soldiers gathered in Dovteleb, the fire was opened by artillery placed in all the sides."

During the period of foundation of the fort, Shusha fortress was continuously reconstructed and expanded until the middle of the 19th century. After the death of Panah Ali Khan, Ibrahim Khalil Khan (his son) also continued the construction of the fortress started by his father. During his reign (1759–1806) and after the annexation of the Karabakh khanate to the Russian Empire, the fortification of Shusha fortress was expanded.

At the beginning of the 19th century (under the complicated historical conditions), Shusha fortress continued to play the role of an important defense system. At that time, the city was in danger of being captured by Qajar army. Therefore, the new Russian administration paid special attention to strengthening the defense system. During the invasion of Shusha by Qajar army in 1826, the defensive walls of the city were in need of serious reconstruction: "At that time, Shusha fortress was in a very dilapidated condition: some of its defensive walls had collapsed, and some of them had been demolished by local residents and stones had been carried to build houses for these citizens; the trenches were almost full… It was necessary to make Shusha capable of defense." Using the 10-day peace treaty, the besieged city "rebuilt the fortress walls in such a way that it could easily repel the attacks of numerous Persian warriors." Because it was successfully rebuilt, its walls could not be destroyed even by the English cannons used during the siege.

During the reconstruction and strengthening process of the fortress in the 19th century, its original appearance was partially changed, and new defensive towers were added to the fort. The towers of the northern walls of the Shusha fortress, seen in the background in Vasily Vereshchagin's painting "The End of Dramatic Play", have a prismatic shape, not a circle as in all the previous plans of the city. Platon Zubov also wrote about the battle towers of the Shusha fortress: "The castle walls built to protect the city from the north have the round towers erected in an old way and playing a good defensive role for Shusha." E. Avalov notes that all the defensive buildings of the Karabakh khanate built in the 18th century – Shahbulag, Shusha and Askeran fortresses – have round towers.

The artist Georg Wilhelm Timm, who lived in the Caucasus from the autumn of 1848 to December 1850, painted the northern walls of the fortress in a painting called "Shusha fortress" almost from the place described by V. Vereshchagin. In his painting, the northern defensive walls are shown with round towers which have loopholes.

Panoramic view of the castle walls from the north (Photo has been taken after First Nagorno-Karabakh War).

=== Gates ===
Shusha fortress had three main gates: Ganja Gate, İrevan Gate and Aghoghlan Gate. The names of all these gates are often mentioned in historical sources, as well as in all the drawn plans of 19th-century Shusha. For example, in the 25th issue of the "Qafqaz" newspaper published in 1871, it was written: "According to Abix's barometric measurements, the northeastern part of the city where the Aghoghlan and Elisabethpol gates are located is 3,886 feet tall, and the southwestern part known as "Shusha Rock" and Irevan Gate are located is 4,705 feet tall." Even in the 1860s, these gates played an important role in the public life of Shusha, as evidenced by an article published in the «Иллюстрация» newspaper. According to the article, Aghoghlan and İrevan gates were intended for the passage of dignitaries and cargo but Ganja gate were used for the passage of carts. Although some sources mentioned that there was the fourth gate of the castle walls, its location and name have not been determined.

Architects have long considered that the acquaintance with the city began with its castle walls, and the architecture of the city was determined by these walls. Therefore, in terms of architectural composition, the main (northern) gate of Shusha fortress is reminiscent of the arch of victory. A similar attitude to the artistic significance of defense systems is characteristic of the architecture (in terms of fortresses) of Azerbaijan, Dagestan, Armenia, Georgia, Central Asia and Ancient Russia.

==== Ganja Gate ====
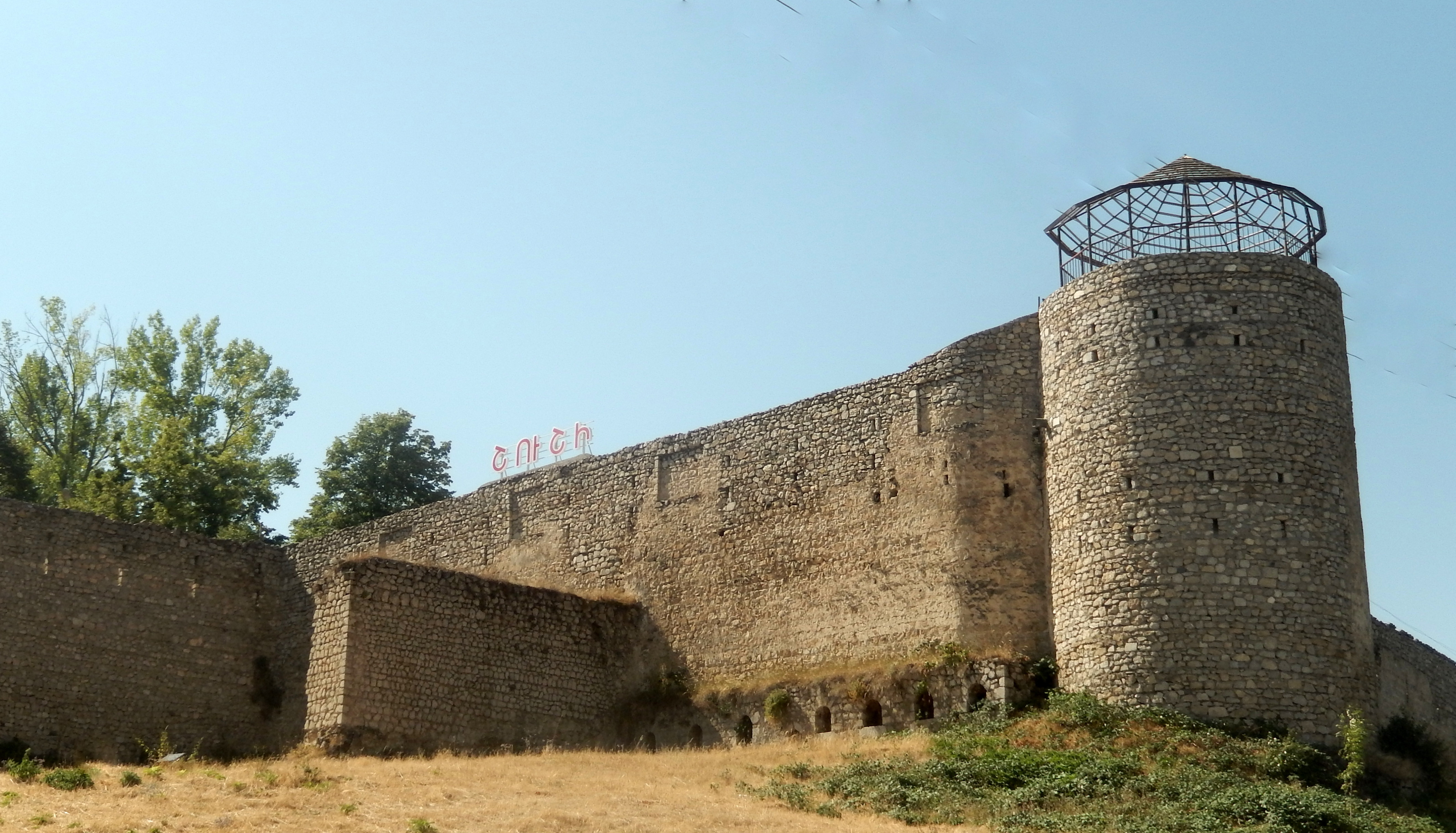
The castle walls, Ganja Gate and the three-tiered tower next to the gate. The view from Mirza Fatali Akhundov Street (Photo has been taken after First Nagorno-Karabakh War).

The gate built during the reign of Panah Ali Khan has been called Ganja Gate or Chilabord Gate since the 18th century. The way through his gate of Shusha fortress connected Ganja city with Chilabord district of Karabakh khanate. After the annexation of the Karabakh Khanate to the Russian Empire in 1805, Ganja was renamed Elisabethpol (1804) and Ganja Gate was called Elisabethpol Gate.

The Northern Gate of Shusha Fortress is located in the middle of the fortress walls – between Aghoghlan and İrevan Gates. Ganja Gate has survived in a better condition to the present day compared to the other gates of Shusha fortress.

The masonry woven from white and black stones in the shape of a checkerboard and a fir effectively surrounds the arched entrance of the castle. There are symmetrical traces of the fake and demolished window exits over the entrance. There are loopholes or tower chimneys among them. The ordering of fake and real window exits was widely used in the architecture of that period to compose the facades of public buildings, and it was adopted by architects as a result of civil architecture.

==== İrevan Gate ====
İrevan Gate or Khalfali Gate is one of three main gates of Shusha Fortress and is located on the western side of the fortress. The road through this gate connected Shusha city with the village of Khalfali and the city Yerevan—or Iravan (İrevan), as it is known in Persian and Azerbaijani.

İrevan Gate, like the other two gates of Shusha fortress, was mentioned in all the plans of Shusha drawn in the 19th century.

Unlike Ganja Gate, İrevan Gate was composed in a more traditional way; The arched door was reinforced with two-tiered battle towers placed symmetrically on both sides.

==== Aghoghlan Gate ====
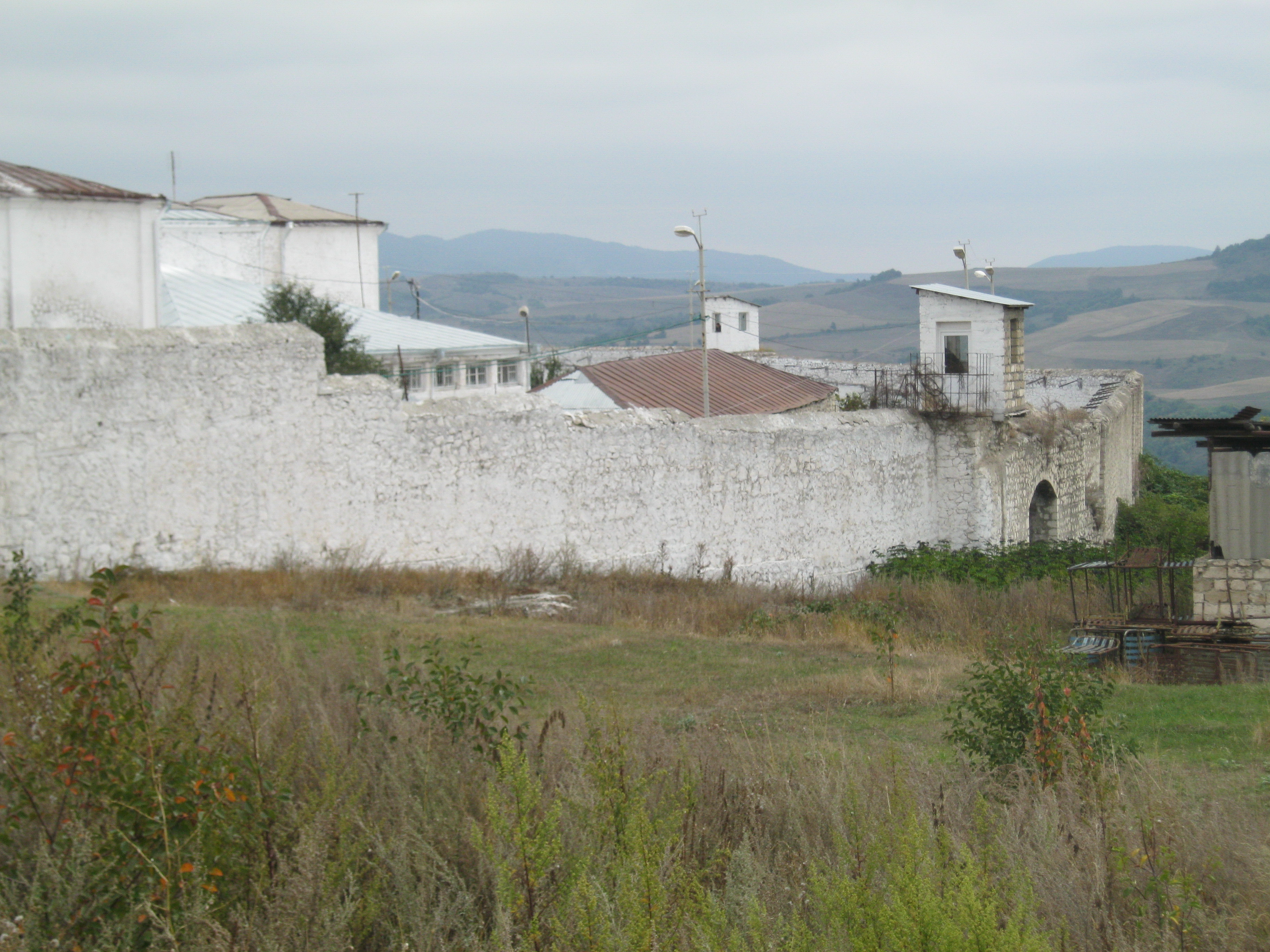
The part of the fortress walls passing near Shusha prison, and Aghoghlan gate (in the right, in the background). Photo has been taken after First Nagorno-Karabakh War.

Aghoghlan Gate, Mukhtar Gate or Shushakend Gate are located on the eastern side of Shusha fortress and provide access to the lower part of the city. The road leading through this gate connected Shusha city with the villages of Shushakend and Mukhtar and extended to Aghoghlan castle. In all Russian-language sources of the 19th century, the southern gate of Shusha was mentioned as Aghoghlan Gate. According to a road map attached to "Qafqaz təqvimi" published in 1846, Shusha fortress was connected to Aghoghlan castle by the road leading through this gate. Another name of this door mentioned in the sources is Topkhana Gate.

E. Avalov notes that according to the drawings kept in Russian State Military and Historical Archive, unlike the northern and western gates of the fortress, Aghoghlan Gate located in the east was not fortified with battle towers and had a fairly simple appearance. The form of the entrance is arched.

=== Inner part ===
According to the sources, at the same time with the construction of Shusha fortress, a castle was built for Panah Ali Khan inside the fortress. E. Avalov notes that the construction of fortress walls for each of the palaces built for members of the khan's family indicates the absence of inner part of Shusha fortress in the early period. From this point of view, Shusha fortress differs from Shaki and Ganja fortresses. According to the author, it is possible to explain in two ways the reason why the fortress does not have a well-developed inner part. The first one is the natural strategic location of Shusha plateau, and the other one is related to the existence of the safekeeping of an ancient rock-palace located in Dashalty Gorge (outside the limits of the city), which is difficult to pass, and a defense castle in the rock cave across it. According to Ahmad bey Javanshir, the cave connected the castle with Shusha fortress by a secret underground road.

According to the main plan of Shusha whose exact date is unknown, during the later development of the fortress, the inner part with a large complex of buildings and surrounded by castle walls and towers was built on a high hill near Ganja Gate of the fortress. The Khan's Palaces, including the palace of Khurshidbanu Natavan who was the daughter of Ibrahim Khalil Khan was located inside the fortress. E. Avalov notes that neither the main plan, nor the parts of Shusha plan drawn in 1837, which have survived until the present day, do not specify the exact purpose of each of the buildings inside the fortress. In one of the drawings (drawn in 1847), the whole interior complex was generally called "Khanshi House".

General information about the appearance of inner part of the fortress was introduced by Vasily Vereshchagin's painting "The End of Dramatic Play" in 1865. The background of the painting depicts inner part of the fortress and the buildings there. E. Avalov notes that many buildings located in the inner part of Shusha fortress were destroyed in the period when the drawing was painted. The parts of walls of the inner fortress and a round tower have survived until the present.

== See also ==
- Shusha State Historical and Architectural Reserve
- List of castles and fortresses in Azerbaijan
- Ganja Gate
- Iravan Gates
- Ashaghy Meydan

== Bibliography ==
- Авалов, Э. В. (1977). Архитектура города Шуши и проблемы сохранения его исторического облика. Baku.
- Bournoutian, George (2016). "Prelude to War: The Russian Siege and Storming of the Fortress of Ganjeh, 1803–4". Iranian Studies. 50 (1). Taylor & Francis: 107–124. doi:10.1080/00210862.2016.1159779. S2CID 163302882.
- Фатуллаев, Ш. С. (1970). Памятники Шуши. Baku.
- Саламзаде, А. В. (1964). Архитектура Азербайджана XVI-XIX вв. Baku.
