= Allahqulular =

Village in Shusha, Azerbaijan

Allahgulular Allahqulular
- Location within Azerbaijan
- Coordinates: 39°45′01″N 46°37′53″E
- Country: Azerbaijan
- District: Shusha
- Time zone: UTC+4

Allahgulular (Azerbaijani: Allahqulular) is a village in the Shusha District of Azerbaijan. Until 3 April 2023 it was controlled by the self-proclaimed Republic of Artsakh.
