= Zarıslı =

Zarysly Azerbaijani: Zarıslı
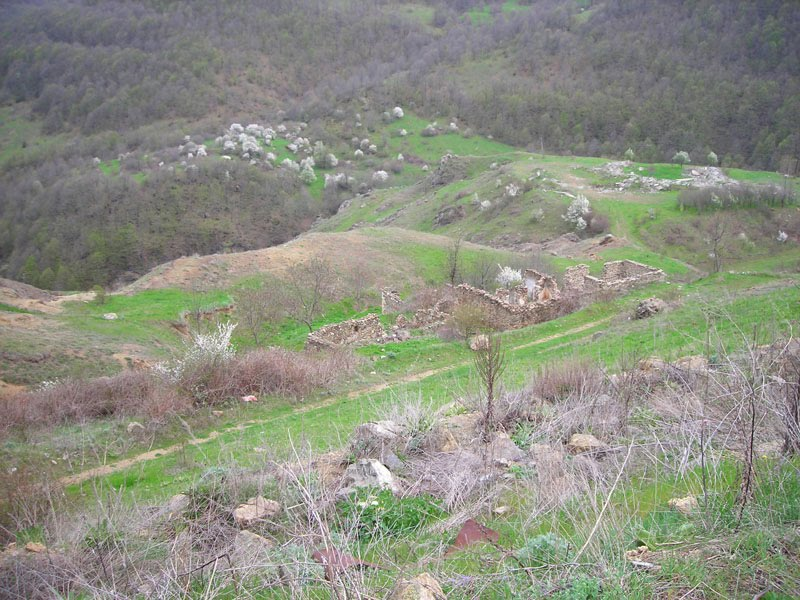

- Location within Azerbaijan
- Coordinates: 39°43′02″N 46°40′34″E
- Country: Azerbaijan
  - District: Shusha
- Time zone: UTC+4

Zarysly (Azerbaijani: Zarıslı) is a village located in Shusha district of Azerbaijan and is the center of the Zarisli rural administrative-territorial district.

== Geography ==
Zarisli village is the center of the Zarisli rural administrative-territorial district of Shusha district. The village is situated at an altitude of 1528 m in the central part of Shusha district.

== History ==
In the 19th century, the village of Zarisli belonged to the khan's daughter, the Azerbaijani poet Khurshidbanu Natavan.

During the Soviet period, the village was part of Shusha district, which in turn was part of the Nagorno-Karabakh Autonomous Region (NKAR) of Azerbaijan SSR.

In 1992 during the First Karabakh War, the territory of the village was occupied by Armenian Armed Forces and was destroyed.

According to the trilateral statement signed on the night of 9-10 November 2020, following the results of the Second Karabakh War, the village came under the control of the Russian Peacekeeping Forces.

As a result of the military operations carried out by the Armed Forces of Azerbaijan in Karabakh on 19-20 September 2023, the village was returned under the control of Azerbaijan.

== Population ==
Before the Armenian occupation, the village had an exclusively Azerbaijani population. During the years of Russian Empire, the village of Zarisli (Zarislu) was part of Shusha district of Elizavetpol province. According to the "Caucasian Calendar" of 1912, 1 139 people lived in the village, mostly Azerbaijanis being listed in the calendar as "Tatars". According to the 1921 census, 363 people lived in the village – also mostly Azerbaijanis, listed as 5 "Turks". According to the data for 1986, 194 people lived in the village were Azerbaijanis.

== Sightseeing ==
Not far from the village there are the ruins of the Zaris fortress.
