= Mets Shen, Shusha =

Village in Shusha, Azerbaijan

Mets Shen / Boyuk Galadarasi Մեծ Շեն / Böyük Qaladərəsi
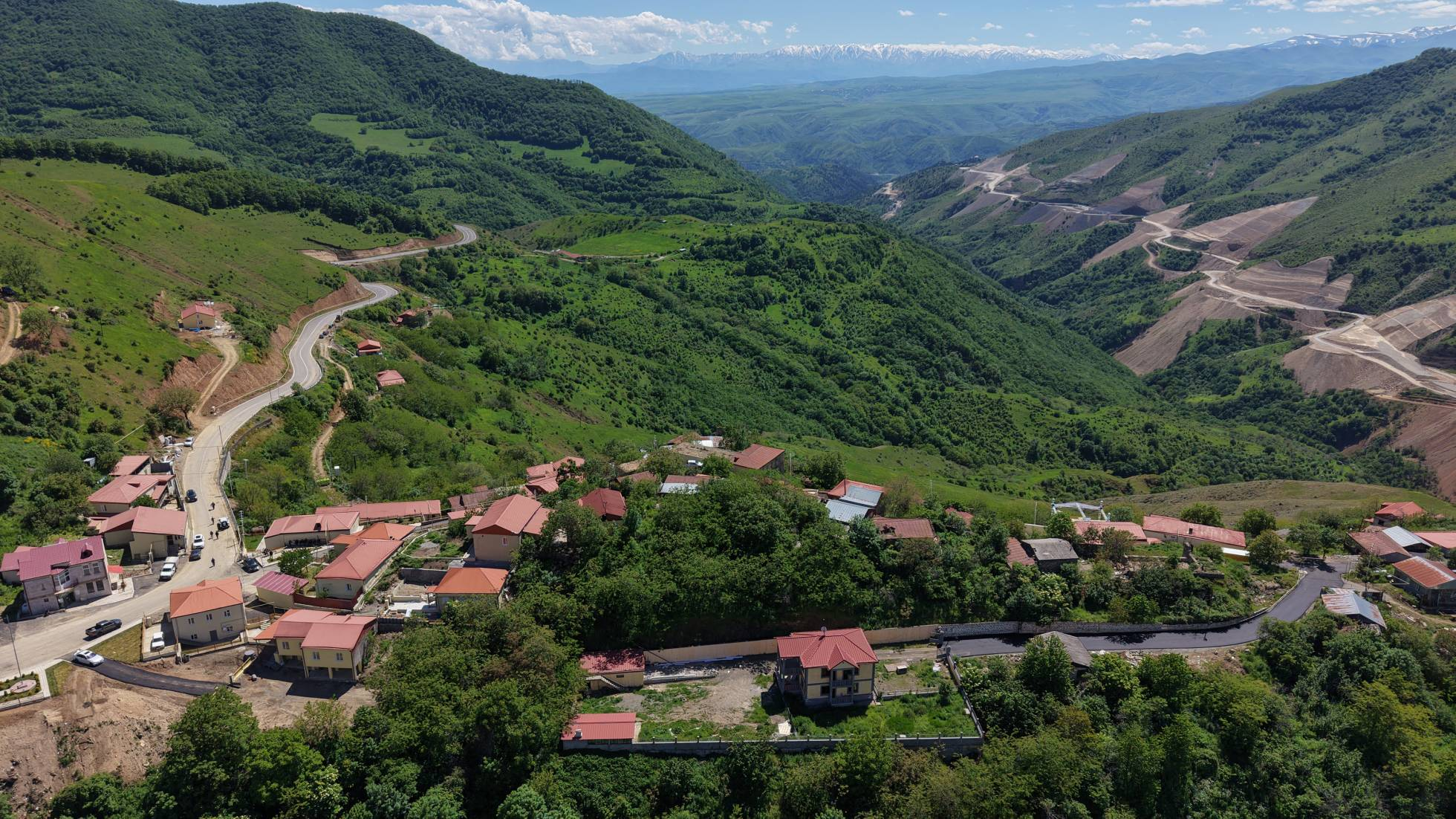
- Boyuk-Galadaresi May, 2026.
- Interactive map of Mets Shen / Boyuk Galadarasi
- Location within Azerbaijan
- Coordinates: 39°39′30″N 46°36′07″E
- Country: Azerbaijan
  - District: Shusha

Population (2015)
  - Total: 116
- Time zone: UTC+4

Mets Shen (Armenian: Մեծ Շեն) or Boyuk Galadarasi (Azerbaijani: Böyük Qaladərəsi) is a village located in the Shusha District of Azerbaijan, in the disputed region of Nagorno-Karabakh. Until 2023 it was controlled by the breakaway Republic of Artsakh. The village had an ethnic Armenian-majority population until the expulsion of the Armenian population of Nagorno-Karabakh by Azerbaijan following the 2023 Azerbaijani offensive in Nagorno-Karabakh.

== Toponymy ==
The village was known as Metskaladeresi (Russian: Мецкаладереси) during the Soviet period.

== History ==
During the Soviet period, the village was a part of the Shusha District of the Nagorno-Karabakh Autonomous Oblast.

== Historical heritage sites ==
Historical heritage sites in and around the village include the church of Parin Pizh (Armenian: Պարին Պիժ) built in 1658, and the 19th-century church of Surb Astvatsatsin (Armenian: Սուրբ Աստվածածին, lit. 'Holy Mother of God').

== Economy and culture ==
The population is mainly engaged in agriculture and animal husbandry. As of 2015, the village has a municipal building, a house of culture, a secondary school, and a medical centre.

== Demographics ==
The village had 92 inhabitants in 2005, and 116 inhabitants in 2015.

== Gallery ==
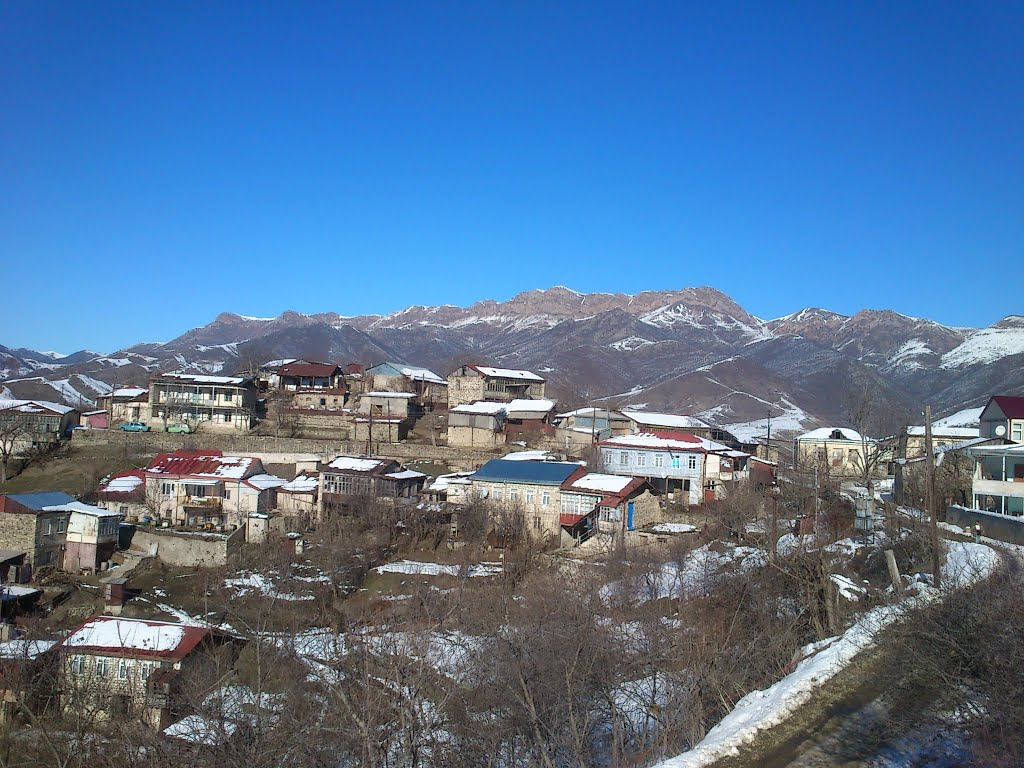
Boyuk Galadarasi Skyline.

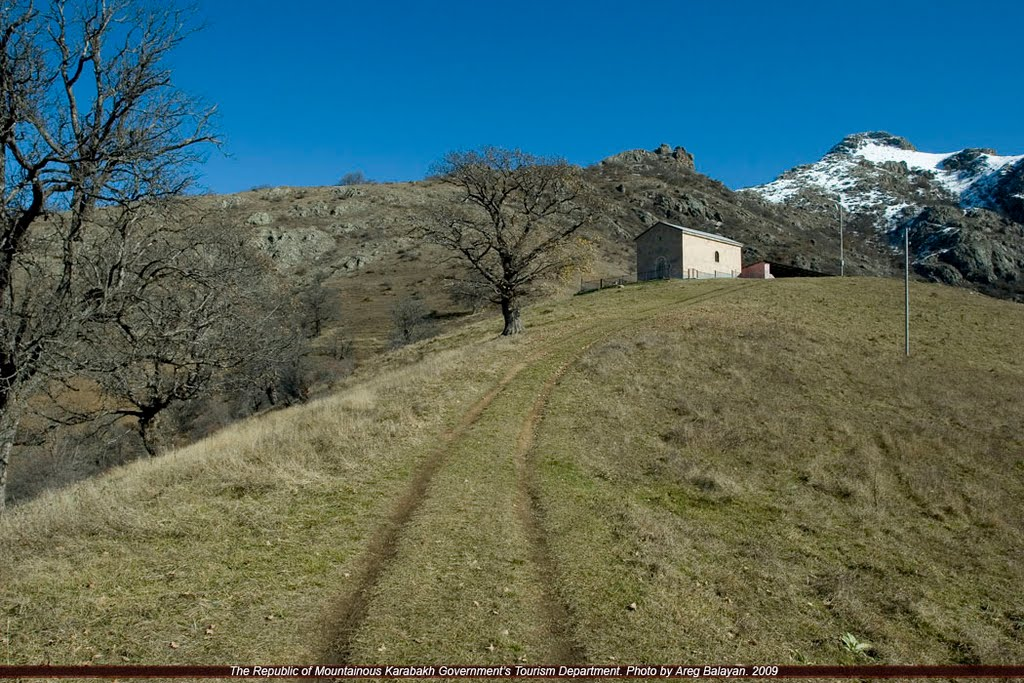
Parin Pizh Church

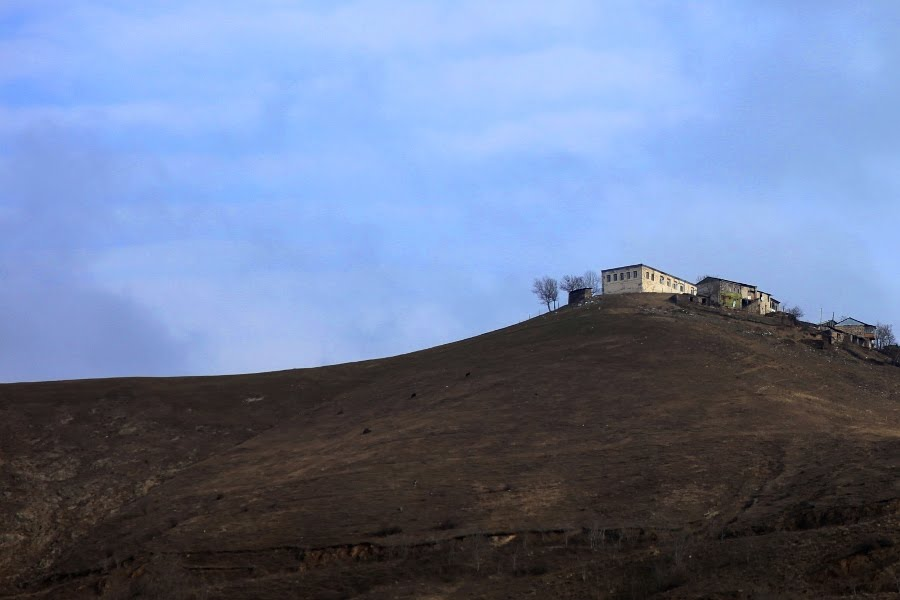

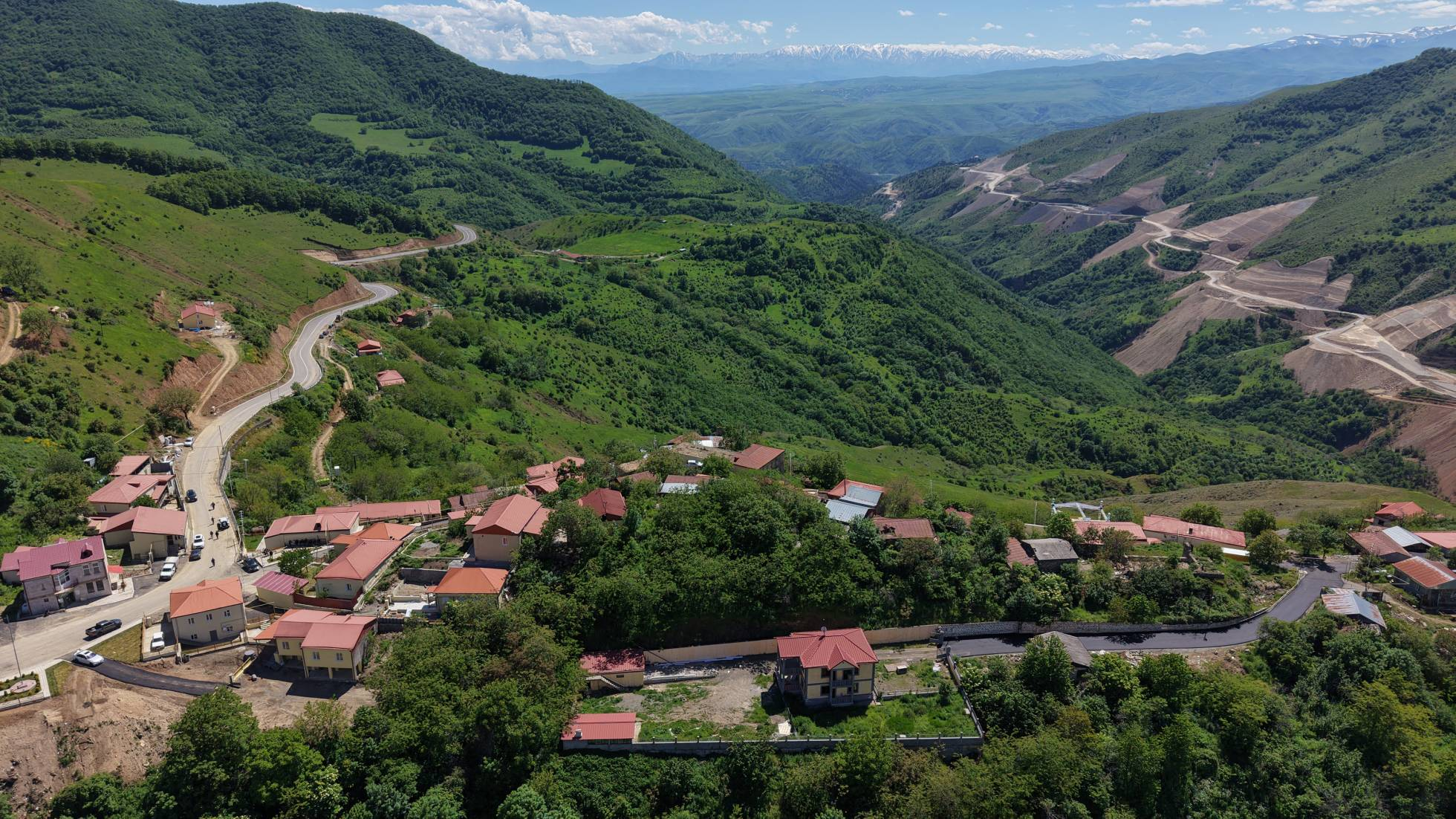
May 2026

== Notable people ==
- Davit Ananun, Armenian historian, journalist, and socialist activist
