= Iravan Gate =

Entrance to Shusha fortress, Azerbaijan

- Shusha, Azerbaijan
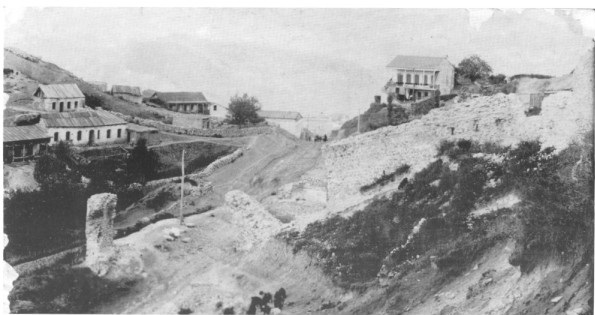

Site information
- Type: Castle gate

Site history
- Built: 18th century
- Materials: Stone

The Iravan Gate or the Khalfali Gate (Armenian: Երևանի դարպաս or Խալֆալի դարպաս, Persian: دروازه ایروان or دروازه خلفعلی, Azerbaijani: İrəvan qapısı or Xəlfəli qapısı) is one of the three main gates of the Shusha fortress, located in the western part of Shusha. The other two gates are: Ganja and Aghoghlan.

== History ==
The Shusha fortress had three main gates: Ganja, Iravan and Aghoghlan. The names of these gates are often mentioned in historical sources and are also indicated on all general plans of the city drawn up in the 19th century. For instance, the 25th issue of the Kavkaz newspaper (1871) notes: “According to Abikh’s barometric calculations, the northeastern part of the city, where the Aghoghlan and Elizavetpol gates are located, is situated at an altitude of 3886 feet, and the southwestern part, called the "Shusha rock", and on which the Iravan gate is placed, is located at an altitude of 4705 feet”. Back in the ‘60s of the 19th century, these gates played an important role in the public life of Shusha, as evidenced by an article published in the "Иллюстрация" newspaper. According to it, the Aghoghlan and Iravan gates were intended for high officials and transportation of the goods, the Ganja gate was for the passage of the wagons. Some sources also spoke of the existence of a fourth gate, but its place and name were not established.

The fortress gate built during Panah Ali Khan was called Iravan or Khalfali, considering that the road from them went to the village of Khalfali and further to Iravan (Yerevan). This gate, like other gates of the Shusha fortress, is marked on all, written in the 19th century, general plans of the city.

== Architectural features ==
Unlike the Ganja Gate, the Iravan Gate was interpreted in a more traditional way - it was designed in the form of a pointed arch, and fortified on both sides by symmetrically located two-tier combat towers.

On the 19th century's drawings and general plans of Shusha, these towers are numbered 1 and 2, since the Iravan gate was the western periphery of the city's fortifications, the countdown of the towers began from them. Although the gate has survived to nowadays in a ruined state, Sara Ashurbeyli, who conducted a research as part of an expedition to Shusha in the 1930s, noted that she observed the arches of the gate.

== Gate plan ==
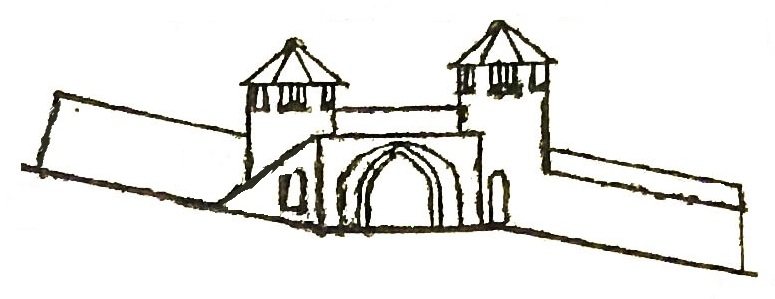

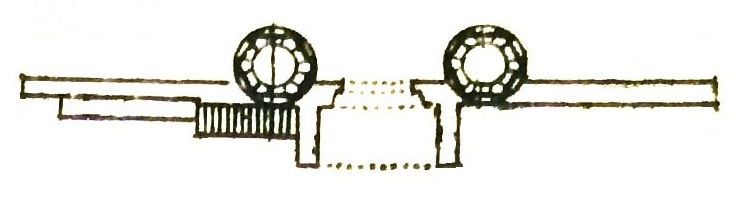

== Literature ==
- Avalov, Elturan (1977). Архитектура города Шуши и проблемы сохранения его исторического облика. Baku: Elm.
