= İmamqulular =

Village in Shusha, Azerbaijan

- Location within Azerbaijan Location within Karabakh Economic Region
- Coordinates: 39°44′37″N 46°35′48″E
- Country: Azerbaijan
- District: Shusha
- Time zone: UTC+4 (AZT)

İmamqulular (Imamgulular) is a village in the Shusha District of Azerbaijan.
