= Xanlıqpəyə =

- Location within Azerbaijan Location within Karabakh Economic Region
- Coordinates: 39°45′22″N 46°36′40″E
- Country: Azerbaijan
- District: Shusha
- Time zone: UTC+4 (AZT)

Xanlıqpəyə (Khanlygpaya) is a village de jure in the Shusha District of Azerbaijan, de facto in the Shushi Province of the self-proclaimed Republic of Artsakh. The village had an Azerbaijani-majority prior to their expulsion during the First Nagorno-Karabakh War.
