= Şuşulu =

- Location within Azerbaijan Location within Karabakh Economic Region
- Coordinates: 39°45′N 46°42′E
- Country: Azerbaijan
- District: Shusha
- Time zone: UTC+4 (AZT)

Şuşulu (Shushulu) is a village in the Shusha District of Azerbaijan.
