= Qarabulaq, Shusha =

Village in Shusha, Azerbaijan

Garabulag
- Azerbaijani: Qarabulaq
- Interactive map of Garabulag
- Country: Azerbaijan
- District: Shusha
- Time zone: UTC+4
  - Summer (DST): UTC+5

Qarabulaq (Garabulag) is a village de jure in the Shusha District of Azerbaijan, de facto in the Shushi Province of the self-proclaimed Republic of Artsakh.
