= Zamanpəyəsi =

- Location within Azerbaijan Location within Karabakh Economic Region
- Coordinates: 39°44′59″N 46°40′24″E
- Country: Azerbaijan
- District: Shusha (de jure)
- Time zone: UTC+4 (AZT)

Zamanpəyəsi (Zamanpayasi) is a village that was occupied by Armenian Armed Forces in 1992. The village was liberated on 3 April 2023 by Azerbaijani Armed Forces.
