= Laçınlar =

Village in Shusha, Azerbaijan

- Location within Azerbaijan Location within Karabakh Economic Region
- Coordinates: 39°45′53″N 46°42′37″E
- Country: Azerbaijan
- District: Shusha
- Time zone: UTC+4 (AZT)

Laçınlar (Lachinlar) is a village in the Shusha District of Azerbaijan. Until 2023 it was controlled by the self-proclaimed Republic of Artsakh.
