= Aghoghlan Gate =

- Shusha, Azerbaijan
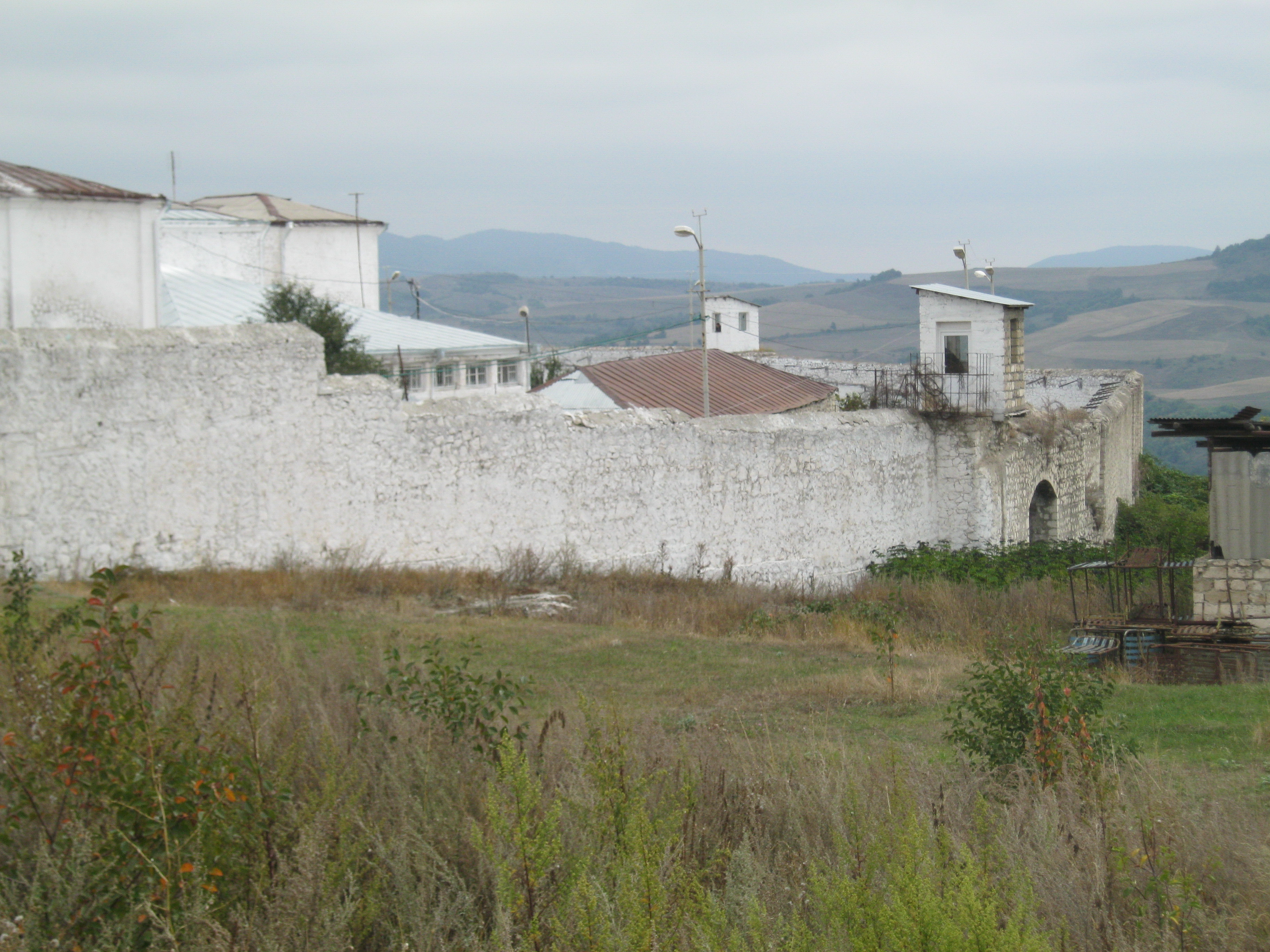

Site information
- Type: Castle walls

Location
- Coordinates: 46°44′58″N 39°45′55″E

Site history
- Built: 1750
- Materials: Stone

Aghoghlan Gate (Armenian: Աղողլան դարպաս, Azerbaijani: Ağoğlan qapısı), also known as the Mukhtar Gate (Armenian: Մուխթարի դարպաս, Azerbaijani: Muxtar qapısı) or the Shushikend Gate (Armenian: Շուշիքենդի դարպաս, Azerbaijani: Şuşakənd qapısı), is one of the four entrance gates to the Shusha fortress in the homonymous city of Shusha.

The fortress and the city came under the control of the self-proclaimed Republic of Artsakh following the capture of Shusha on 8 May 1992 until 8 November 2020 when Azerbaijani Army captured the city after a 3-day long battle.

== Description ==
In compliance with medieval traditions in urban development of the khanate period, the walls of the Shusha castle were built with four gates: The main gate was facing north towards the road to Ganja and was therefore named Ganja Gate. The western gate was facing western regions, including the Iranian Erivan Khanate, and was hence called Iravan Gate. The other two gates opened to surrounding highland villages.

The road from the gate of the fortress, built during the reign of Panah Ali Khan, connected the city of Shusha with the villages of Shushikend and Mukhtar and extended to Agoghlan castle. In all Russian-language sources of the 19th century, the southern gate of the city was mentioned as Agoghlan Gate. In the 19th century, the Shusha prison was built in the lower part of the fortress, near the eastern gate. During the construction of the prison, part of the castle walls and defense towers were used as prison walls.

Another name of this door mentioned in the sources is Topkhana gate.
