= Armenian Social-Democratic Labour Organization =

The Armenian Social-Democratic Labour Organization (Armenian: Սոցիալ-դեմոկրատական բանվորական հայ կազմակերպություն, Sotsial-Demokratakan Banvorakan Hai Kazmakerpoutiun, abbreviated «ՍԴԲՀԿ», S.D.B.H.K.), often pejoratively referred to as the Specifists (Armenian: սպեցիֆիկներ, spets’ifikner), was an Armenian Marxist organization in the Russian Empire.

== History ==
The S.D.B.H.K. was founded in Baku in October 1903 by a group of Armenians who had become Marxists during studies in Germany and Switzerland, as well as a few ex-Dashnaks, ex-Hunchak intellectuals and others. The group was, in particular, dissatisfied with the outcome of the 2nd Congress of the Russian Social Democratic Labour Party.

The S.D.B.H.K. sought to establish trade unions among Armenian workers along similar lines as the General Jewish Labour Bund. Like the General Jewish Labour Bund, the S.D.B.H.K. argued with the Bolsheviks and Mensheviks to allow autonomous ethnic organizations within the Russian Social Democratic Labour Party. The organization advocated a Marxism reflecting the specific national conditions of the Armenians of Transcaucasia, and that Armenian-inhabited areas "required a special agrarian program." Key figures of the S.D.B.H.K. included Bakhshi Ishkhanyan, A. Rubeni (who later joined the Bolsheviks), Ghazar Ter Ghazarian, Nariman Ter Ghazarian, T. Isakhanyan, E. Palyan, G. Kuzikyan (Yesalim), and Davit Ananun.

In its early phase, the small organization began agitations among workers and students, and began publishing leaflets and brochures for mass distribution. The S.D.B.H.K. distributed its propaganda in and around Baku (mobilizing workers in Balakhani, Bibi-Eybat and Black Town) as well as in Batumi, Tiflis, and in the countryside of Nagorno-Karabakh. On May 1, 1904, the S.D.B.H.K. organized a strike of 4,000–5,000 Armenian workers in Balakhani.

The Armenian Social-Democratic Workers Organization concentrated its efforts in labour organizing, leading some thirty strikes between 1906 and 1917. It claimed to have some 2,000 workers organized in its unions throughout Transcaucasia. The S.D.B.H.K. favoured a system of broad local government and national-cultural autonomy within Russia. In 1904, its main organ was Sotsiyalist ('Socialist') issued from Baku, which later relocated to Geneva and continued publishing there 1905-1906.

In January 1905, the S.D.B.H.K. was invited to a conference of the Russian Social Democratic Labour Party, the General Jewish Labour Bund, the Social Democracy in the Latvian Territory and the Revolutionary Ukrainian Party. The S.D.B.H.K. had expressed its intention to send a delegation for the conference, but did not attend in the end. The organization received fierce criticisms from the other social democratic factions in the Caucasus, both the Bolsheviks (Joseph Stalin and Stepan Shaumian) and Mensheviks (Arshak Zurabov and Noe Zhordania). Ahead of the 3rd Congress of the Russian Social Democratic Labour Party in 1905, both the Menshevik leader Zhordania and the Bolshevik leader Vladimir Lenin argued against a union with the S.D.B.H.K. Lenin referred to the group as a 'bundist creature'.

Following the defeat of the Russian Revolution of 1905, the S.D.B.H.K. had local units in Baku, Tiflis, Batumi, and Shushi. During 1906-1907 the S.D.B.H.K. published Kiank ('Life') and, later, Dzayn ('Voice') as its Tiflis organs. Later Specifist organs included Banvor ('Worker') published in Baku in 1907 (revived in 1917), Gorts ('Work') in Tiflis in 1908; Nor kiank ('New Life') in Baku 1911-1912, Garun ('Spring') in Moscow irregularly 1910-1912 and Mer ughin ('Our Way') published in Baku in 1912. By 1910-1911 the organization had been largely suppressed by the Russian government.

Following the 1917 February Revolution, the Specifists supported the Provisional Government of Russia and opposed any reduction of the war effort. In the summer of 1917 the S.D.B.H.K. merged with the Russian Social Democratic Labour Party (Mensheviks) and the General Jewish Labour Bund to create a united Social Democratic organization in Baku. In the independent First Republic of Armenia (1918–1920), Davit Ananun and other Specifists founded the Social-Democratic Labour Party of Armenia as an opposition party. It was dissolved following the Sovietization of Armenia in 1920.

While the Specifists never gained a broad mass following, the Specifist tendency continued to be active in the Communist Party of Armenia well into the Soviet period. A number of former members of the S.D.B.H.K. held prominent positions in the government of Soviet Armenia, such as Alexander Miasnikian and Ashot Hovhannisian․

== See also ==
- Armenian Soviet Socialist Republic
- Communist Party of Armenia (Soviet Union)
