= Ashaghy Meydan =

- Interactive map of Ashaghy Meydan
- Native name: Azerbaijani: Aşağı meydan
- Former name: Torpag Meydany
- Location: Shusha, Azerbaijan
- Coordinates: 39.7615°N 46.7565°E

Construction
- Completion: XVIII century

Ashaghy Meydan or Torpag Meydany (in Azerbaijani - "Lower Square", "Earthen Square") is one of the oldest squares in the city of Shusha being located in the lower part of the Shusha fortress.

== History ==
The name of the Ashaghy Meydan square is connected with its location in the lower part of the Shusha fortress being related to the site occupied by Meydan (the main square of the city). The Ashaghy Meydan square is also known as Torpag Meydany (Earthen square), since, unlike other areas of Shusha, it had an earthen cover, not a stone one.

On the general plan of Shusha, the attention is drawn to the adjoining public buildings in the western part of Ashaghy Meydan, none of which survive. Due to the fact that no explanations or comments are given in the plan, it is not known what functions they performed. According to the Karabakh historian Baharly, the bathhouse of Gazi Mirza Ali was located on the square.

== Peculiarities ==
The square is located in the center of Ashaghy Mekhelle (“Lower Quarter”). It was connected with the Yukhari Govhar Agha Mosque through the Ashaghy Bazaar Street. It had a flat relief, large sizes, a shopping complex was placed on it. Considering these factors, E. Avalov notes that Ashaghy Meydan was one of the oldest squares in the city and for a long time it was one of the main public and shopping centers of Shusha.

== Literature ==
- Elturan Avalov (1977). Архитектура города Шуши и проблемы сохранения его исторического облика. Baku: Elm.
