= Dükanlar =

Village in Shusha, Azerbaijan

- Location within Azerbaijan
- Coordinates: 39°45′42.9″N 46°42′28.8″E
- Country: Azerbaijan
- District: Shusha
- Time zone: UTC+4 (AZT)

Dükanlar (Dukanlar) is a village in the Shusha District of Azerbaijan.
