= Ganja Gate =

Entrance to Shusha fortress, Azerbaijan

- Shusha, Azerbaijan
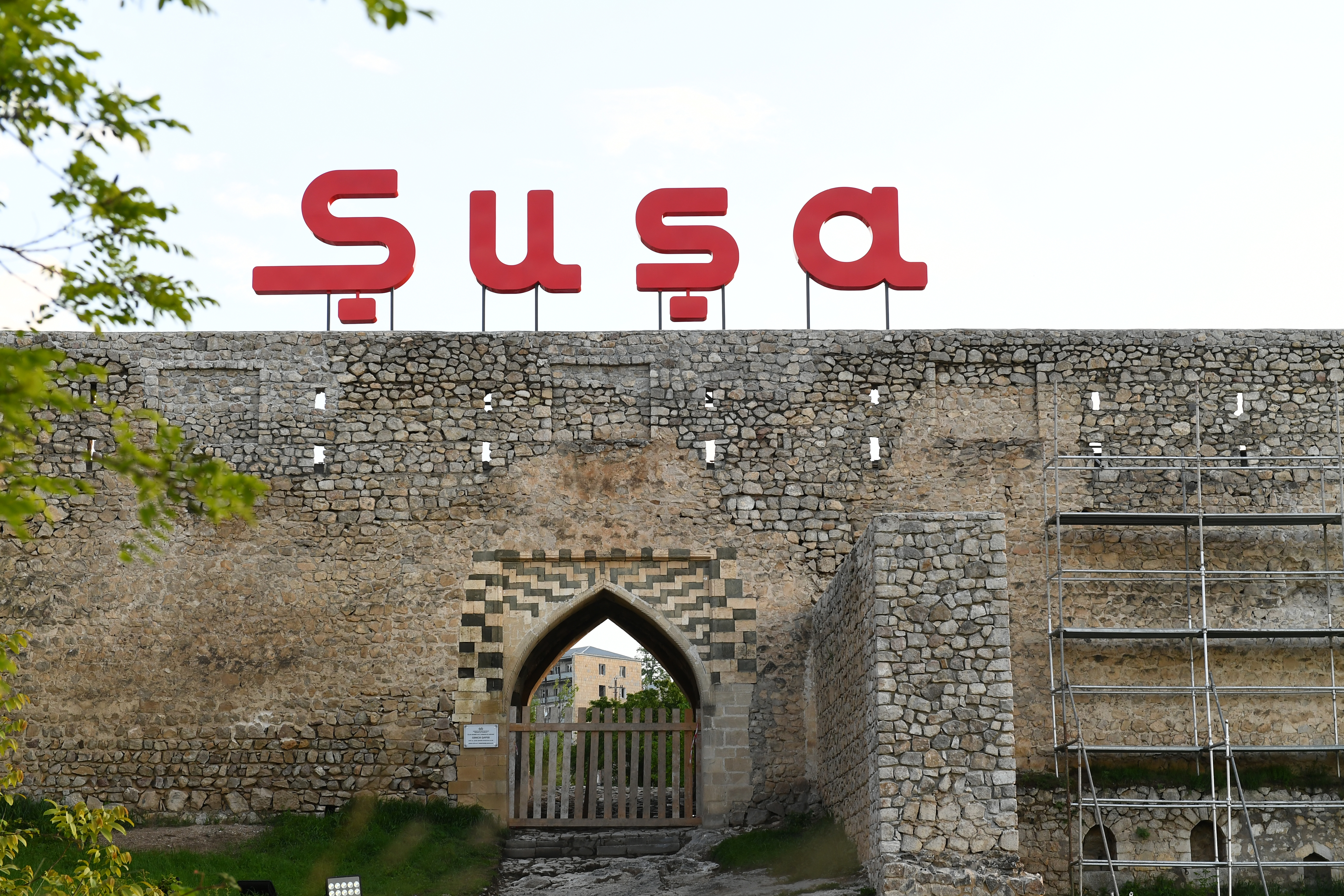

Site information
- Type: Castle walls

Location
- Coordinates: 39.765830°N 46.750419°E

Site history
- Built: 1750
- Materials: Stone

Ganja Gate (Azerbaijani: Gəncə qapısı, Armenian: Գանձակի դարպաս, romanized: Gandzaki darpas) is one of the three main gates of the Shusha fortress in Shusha, Azerbaijan, and is located on the fortress's northern side. The other two gates are the Iravan Gate and the Aghoghlan Gate.

== Description ==
In compliance with medieval traditions in urban development of the khanate period, Shusha castle walls were built with four gates. The main gate was facing north towards the road to Ganja, Azerbaijan and was therefore named Ganja Gate. The western gate was facing western regions including the Iranian Erivan Khanate and was hence called Erivan Gate. The other two gates opened to surrounding highland villages. Shusha's internal castle was located on a peak near the Ganja Gate. The Ganja Gate bears architectural importance and is often mentioned among other significant 279 attributes of Shusha State Historical and Architectural Reserve of the 18th century.

== History ==
The fortress and the city were part of the Nagorno-Karabakh Autonomous Oblast; they later came under the control of the self-proclaimed Republic of Artsakh, following the Battle of Shusha on 8 May 1992 until 8 November 2020, when the Azerbaijani Armed Forces retook the city after a 3-day long battle.
