= Nağılar, Shusha =

Village in Shusha, Azerbaijan

Nağılar
- Location within Azerbaijan
- Coordinates: 39°46′25.0″N 46°43′38.2″E
- Country: Azerbaijan
- Rayon: Shusha
- Time zone: UTC+4
  - Summer (DST): UTC+5

Nağılar (also, Naghilar) is a village in the Shusha District of Azerbaijan.
