= Xanalı =

- Location within Azerbaijan Location within Karabakh Economic Region
- Coordinates: 39°44′56″N 46°35′23″E
- Country: Azerbaijan
- District: Shusha
- Time zone: UTC+4 (AZT)

Xanalı (Khanaly) is a village in the Shusha District of Azerbaijan.
