= Xanalılar, Lachin =

Xanalılar
- Location within Azerbaijan Location within East Zangezur Economic Region
- Coordinates: 39°33′14″N 46°38′24″E
- Country: Azerbaijan
- Rayon: Lachin
- Time zone: UTC+4 (AZT)
  - Summer (DST): UTC+5 (AZT)

Xanalılar (also, Khanalılar) is a village in the Lachin Rayon of Azerbaijan.
