= Hayk Ovsepyan =

Soviet Armenian military leader and politician (1891–1937)

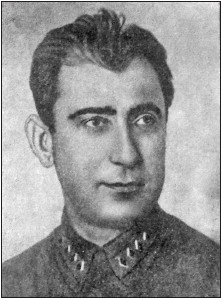

First Secretary of the Communist Party of Armenia
- In office 6 July 1927 – 8 April 1928
- Preceded by: Ashot Hovhannisyan
- Succeeded by: Haykaz Kostanyan

Personal details
- Born: 19 January 1891 Bashkadyklar, Kars Oblast, Russian Empire
- Died: 10 September 1937 (aged 46) Moscow, Soviet Union
- Party: RSDLP (Bolsheviks) (1913–1918); CPSU (1918–1937)
- Awards: Order of the Red Banner

Military service
- Allegiance: Russian Empire (1914–1917) (Russian Socialist Federative Soviet Republic) Soviet Russia (1917–1922); Soviet Union (1922–1937)
- Years of service: 1914–1937
- Rank: Army Commissar 2nd rank
- Battles/wars: First World War; Russian Civil War

Hayk Alexandri Hovsepyan or Gayk Alexandrovich Osepyan (Ovsepyan) (Armenian: Հայկ Ալեքսանդրի Հովսեփյան; Russian: Гайк Александрович Осепян (Овсепян); 19 January or 19 June 1891 – 10 September 1937) was a Soviet military leader and politician of Armenian origin. He was also a deputy chief of the General Political Department of the Red Army. He was executed in 1937 during the Great Purge.

== Biography ==
Hayk Hovsepyan was born in 1891 to an Armenian family in the village of Bashkadyklar (Başgedikler) in the Kars Oblast of the Russian Empire. He was active in a number of political parties, including the Bolshevik faction of the Russian Social Democratic Labour Party, which he joined in 1913. He graduated from the Moscow Lazarev seminary in 1911, as well as the Medical Faculty of Moscow University. During the First World War, he served on the Caucasian front. In 1917 he went to Tiflis and participated in the founding of the Communist Party of Armenia, also serving as the editor of its newspaper Karmir Orer ("Red Days"). In mid-1918 he went to Moscow at worked at the People's Commissariat for Nationalities and edited the journal Kommunist. In 1921 he returned to Armenia and became secretary of the Alexandropol city committee of the Russian Communist Party (Bolshevik).

In 1922, he became the head of the political section of the Armenian Infantry Division of the Caucasian Army. From 1925 to 1927, he was the deputy head of the political directorate of the Caucasian Army. In 1927, he was elected First Secretary of the Central Committee of the Communist Party of Armenia. In 1928, he was appointed deputy head of the Volga Military District and first deputy head of its political directorate. From 1929 to 1937, he served in the Political Directorate of the Red Army, first as department head, then deputy, then first deputy of the directorate. At the same time, he served as secretary of the party committee of the central directorate of the People's Commissariat for Defence for six years, and also edited the journal Kommunist RKKA. He was also a member of the Central Executive Committee of the Transcaucasian SFSR. In 1937, he was arrested and sentenced to death by the Military Collegium of the Supreme Court of the Soviet Union; he was shot on the same day that he received the sentence. He was later rehabilitated.

== Awards ==
- Order of the Red Banner (1928)

== Sources ==
- "Հովսեփյան Հայկ Ալեքսանդրի" [Hovsepyan Hayk Aleksandri]. Հայկական համառոտ հանրագիտարան [Armenian Concise Encyclopedia] (in Armenian). Vol. 3. Yerevan: Armenian Encyclopedia Publishing House. 1999. p. 414.
- Ayvazyan, H. M., ed. (2005). "Հովսեփյան Հայկ Ալեքսանդրի" [Hovsepyan Hayk Aleksandri]. Ով ով է․ հայեր (կենսագրական հանրագիտարան) [Who's Who: Armenians (Biographical Encyclopedia)] (in Armenian). Vol. 1. Yerevan: Armenian Encyclopedia Publishing House. p. 686.
- Cherushev, Nikolai Semyonovich; Cherushev, Yury Nikolaevich (2012). Расстрелянная элита РККА (командармы 1-го и 2-го рангов, комкоры, комдивы и им равные): 1937—1941. Биографический словарь [Executed Elite of the Red Army (Komandarms of the 1st and 2nd ranks, Komkors, Komdivs, and equivalents) 1937–1941 Biographical Dictionary] (in Russian). Moscow: Kuchkovo Pole. ISBN 9785995002178.
