= Mets Shen, Martakert =

Mets Shen / Ulu Garabey Մեծ Շեն / Ulu Qarabəy
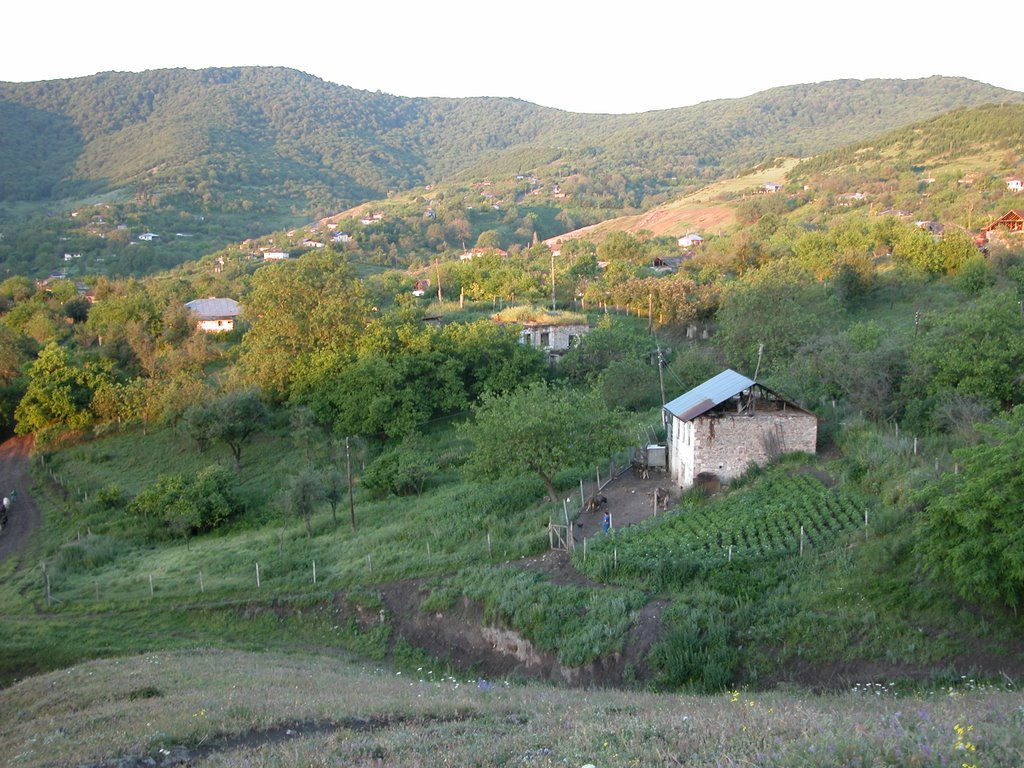

- Location within Azerbaijan
- Coordinates: 40°12′56″N 46°42′25″E
- Country: Azerbaijan
  - District: Aghdara

Population (2015)
  - Total: 341
- Time zone: UTC+4 (AZT)

Mets Shen (Armenian: Մեծ Շեն) or Ulu Garabey (Azerbaijani: Ulu Qarabəy) is a village that is located in the Aghdara District of Azerbaijan, in the region of Nagorno-Karabakh. Until 2023 it was controlled by the breakaway Republic of Artsakh. The village had an ethnic Armenian-majority population until the expulsion of the Armenian population of Nagorno-Karabakh by Azerbaijan following the 2023 Azerbaijani offensive in Nagorno-Karabakh.

== History ==
During the Soviet period, the village was part of the Mardakert District of the Nagorno-Karabakh Autonomous Oblast.

== Historical heritage sites ==
Historical heritage sites in and around the village include tombs from the 2nd–1st millennia BCE, the medieval fortress of Dzoratap (Armenian: Ձորատափ), a 17th-century khachkar, and the 17th-century St. George's Church (Armenian: Սուրբ Գևորգ եկեղեցի, romanized: Surb Gevorg Yekeghetsi).

== Economy and culture ==
The population is mainly engaged in agriculture and animal husbandry. As of 2015, the village has a municipal building, a house of culture, a secondary school, a kindergarten, two shops, and a medical centre.

== Demographics ==
The village had 322 inhabitants in 2005, and 341 inhabitants in 2015.
