= Xəlfəli, Sabirabad =

Xəlfəli
- Municipality
- Location within Azerbaijan
- Coordinates: 39°57′19″N 48°40′42″E
- Country: Azerbaijan
- Rayon: Sabirabad

Population
  - Total: 1,924
- Time zone: UTC+4 (AZT)
  - Summer (DST): UTC+5 (AZT)

Xəlfəli (also, Khalfali) is a village and municipality in the Sabirabad Rayon of Azerbaijan. It has a population of 1,924.
