= Ashot Hovhannisian =

Soviet Armenian historian, theorist, and politician (1887–1972)

- Աշոտ Հովհաննիսյան
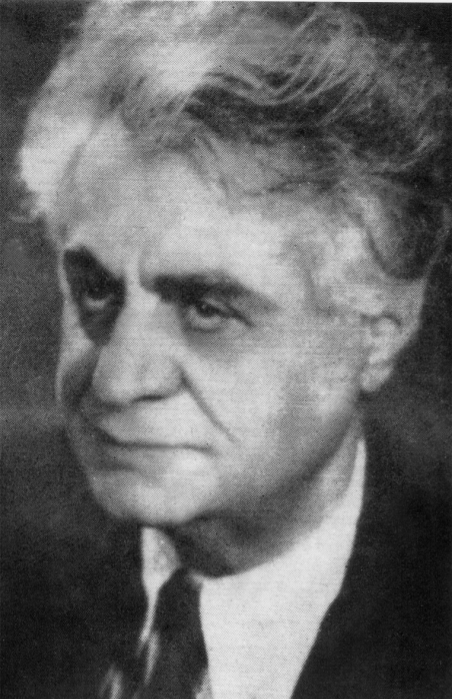

First Secretary of the Communist Party of Armenia
- In office January 1922 – July 1927
- Preceded by: Askanaz Mravyan
- Succeeded by: Hayk Ovsepyan

1st Minister of Education of Soviet Armenia
- In office December 1920 – 1921
- Preceded by: position established
- Succeeded by: Poghos Makintsian

Personal details
- Born: June 17, 1887 Shusha, Shusha uezd, Elizavetpol Governorate, Russian Empire
- Died: June 30, 1972 (aged 85) Yerevan, Armenian Soviet Socialist Republic, Soviet Union
- Party: RSDLP (Bolsheviks) (1906–1918); Russian Communist Party (1918–1937)
- Education: Ludwig-Maximilians-Universität München
- Occupation: Scholar, revolutionary, official

Ashot Garegini Hovhannisian (Armenian: Աշոտ Գարգինի Հովհաննիսյան; Russian: Ашот Гарегинович Иоаннисян, Ashot Gareginovich Ioannisyan; June 17, 1887 – June 30, 1972) was an Armenian Marxist historian, theorist and Communist official.

== Life and career ==
=== Early life ===
Hovhannisian was born on 17 June 1887 in the city Shusha in the Shusha uezd of the Elizavetpol Governorate of the Russian Empire. He was educated at the local realschule and came under the influence of the social democrats. In 1905, he led an anti-Tsar school strike and handed out flyers demanding that Armenian language be a mandatory subject at the school. In September 1906, he moved to Germany, where he began studying philosophy at the University of Jena under philosophers Otto Liebmann and Ernst Haeckel, among others. He partook in union activities and in late 1906 joined the Russian Social Democratic Labour Party (RSDLP). He then continued his education at the University of Halle, where he studied economics, and the Ludwig-Maximilians-Universität München, where he studied philosophy. He graduated from the Ludwig-Maximilians-Universität München in 1913 with a doctorate in philosophy.

In 1913, he returned to Shusha, his birthplace, where he taught German and history at the local Armenian seminary. In 1914, he moved to Vagharshapat (Echmiadzin) at the suggestion of Catholicos Gevorg V and began teaching political economy, Latin, German and history at the Gevorgian Seminary, the primary educational institution of the Armenian Apostolic Church. At the seminary, he propagated social-democratic ideas among the students, including Anastas Mikoyan and Aghasi Khanjian, who later became prominent communists.

After the February Revolution of 1917, the seminary closed down and Hovannisian returned to Shusha, where he edited the Armenian-language socialist newspaper Nets'uk (Support). In late 1917, he moved to Baku at the request of Stepan Shaumian. He participated in the Baku Commune and became the head of its education department. He also edited the newspaper Banvori khosk' (The worker's word), the Armenian-language organ of the Communist Party's Baku branch. After the fall of the Baku Commune in August 1918, Hovhannisian moved to Astrakhan, then to Moscow by late 1918, where he worked at the Armenian branch of the People's Commissariat for Nationalities of Soviet Russia, then at the Armenian branch of the People's Commissariat for Education. In August 1920, he visited Yerevan as a member of Boris Legran's delegation to negotiate with the Dashnak government of the First Republic of Armenia. Hovhannisian was a signatory of a secret decision made in September 1920 by the leadership of the Communist Party of Armenia which called on members to work to "speed up Armenia's defeat" in the Turkish–Armenian War and "dissolve the Armenian army by all means" in order to facilitate the Sovietization of Armenia.

=== Soviet period ===
After the Sovietization of Armenia, Hovhannisian was appointed Minister of Education. In that position, he declared Armenian the official language of Soviet Armenia, fought illiteracy, established a government-run publishing house and Cultural-Educational Institute, organized Yerevan State University, Cultural-Historical Institute, Revolutionary Museum of Yerevan. With Alexander Miasnikian, he persuaded prominent Armenian men of sciences and arts from abroad to move to Soviet Armenia. Under Hovhannisian, the ministry of education confiscated the properties of the Armenian Church in December 1920, including the museums, library and publishing house of the Echmiadzin. He taught Leninism at Yerevan State University between 1921 and 1927.

In January 1922 he was elected first secretary of the Communist Party of Armenia and remained in that position until July 1927. He oversaw the reconstruction of the Armenian economy, promoted education and science, agriculture and industry. He was dismissed for "his underestimation of the dangers of Trotskyism and specifism (independent Marxism)."

In July 1927 he moved to Leningrad, where he worked at the State Public Library (now National Library of Russia) for a year, then was invited to work in Moscow, at the Marx–Engels–Lenin Institute in 1928–31. Between 1931 and 1934 he was vice-director of the Institute of Nationalities of the USSR and in 1934–35 at the State Academy for the History of Material Culture as head of the Moscow branch and in 1935–37 worked as vice-director of the USSR Institute of History.

During the Great Purge under Stalin, Hovhannisian was fired from his job in July 1937, then aged 50, and arrested on trumped-up charges. He was jailed first in Moscow and Yerevan, then was exiled to the Komi Republic, then to Yangiyoʻl in Uzbekistan. He was permitted to return to Armenia in 1943 with the condition not to live in Yerevan. Consequently, he resided in Kirovakan (now Vanadzor) and was allowed to work at the institutes of history and literature of the Academy of Sciences of the Armenian SSR remotely, between 1943 and 1954.

After appealing to Anastas Mikoyan, Hovhannisian was fully rehabilitated on August 11, 1954. That same year, he began work at the Institute of History of the Armenian Academy of Sciences as a senior researcher and headed the new history department from 1961. In 1955, he defended his doctoral thesis and in 1960, he was elected a full member (academician) of the Armenian Academy. Hovhannisian died in Yerevan on June 30, 1972.

== Research ==
Hovhannisian's doctoral thesis at the Ludwig-Maximilians-Universität München was devoted to Israel Ori and titled Israel Ory und die armenische Befreiungsidee, which was published in German in 1913. While teaching at the Gevorgian Seminary in Echmiadzin in 1914–17, Hovhannisian began researching at the library and manuscript repository of the Armenian Church. His papers on medieval Armenian history and Armenian-Russian relations were published in Ararat, the journal of the church. His other notable works include Hay-rus orientats'iayi tsagman khndirë (The question of the origin of the Armenian-Russian orientation, 1921), Nalbandyanë ev nra zhamanakë (Nalbandian and his time, 1955–1956), Drvagner hay azatagrakan mtk'i patmut'yan (Episodes of the history of Armenian liberation thought, 1957–1959), and Hay-rusakan haraberut'yunnerë 18-rd dari arajin yeresnamyakin (Armenian-Russian relations in the first three decades of the 18th century, 1967).

Hovhannisian glorified Israel Ori for his "dedication and the 'wisdom' of adopting a 'Russian' orientation that was to withstand the passage of time and regimes."

== Recognition ==
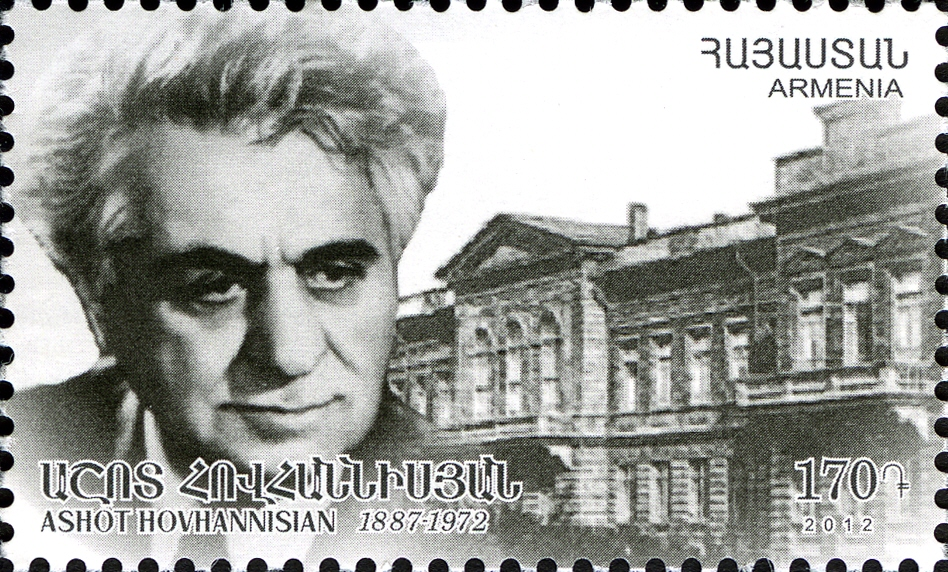
Hovhannisian on 2012 Armenian stamp

Hovhannisian was one of the most significant Armenian historians of the 20th century. His interest in the history of Armenia's modernization was not a matter of purely academic interest, but a practical one. Gerard Libaridian noted that Hovhannisian "dominated Soviet Armenian historiography until his death, and in some respects, even after." A Soviet dissident publication noted that "[r]ather than as a political figure, he is better known as an intellectual possessing a high degree of originality, which is a rare phenomenon within the ranks of the Communist Party."

Hovhannisian became a full member (academician) of the Armenian Academy of Sciences in 1960. His obituary was signed by Soviet Armenian leader Anton Kochinyan, long-time top Soviet official Anastas Mikoyan, World War II hero Ivan Bagramyan, and numerous scientists and scholars, including Viktor Ambartsumian, Sergey Mergelyan, Andronik Iosifyan, Boris Piotrovsky. His bronze bust stands at the central campus of Yerevan State University.

The Ashot Johannissyan Research Institute in the Humanities was established in Yerevan in 2014. It conducts theoretical and philosophical research.

== Awards ==
Hovhannisian was named an Honored Scientist of the Armenian SSR in 1961, awarded the Order of Lenin in 1967, and the State Prize of the Armenian SSR posthumously in 1985.
