= Shusha District (NKAO) =

- District
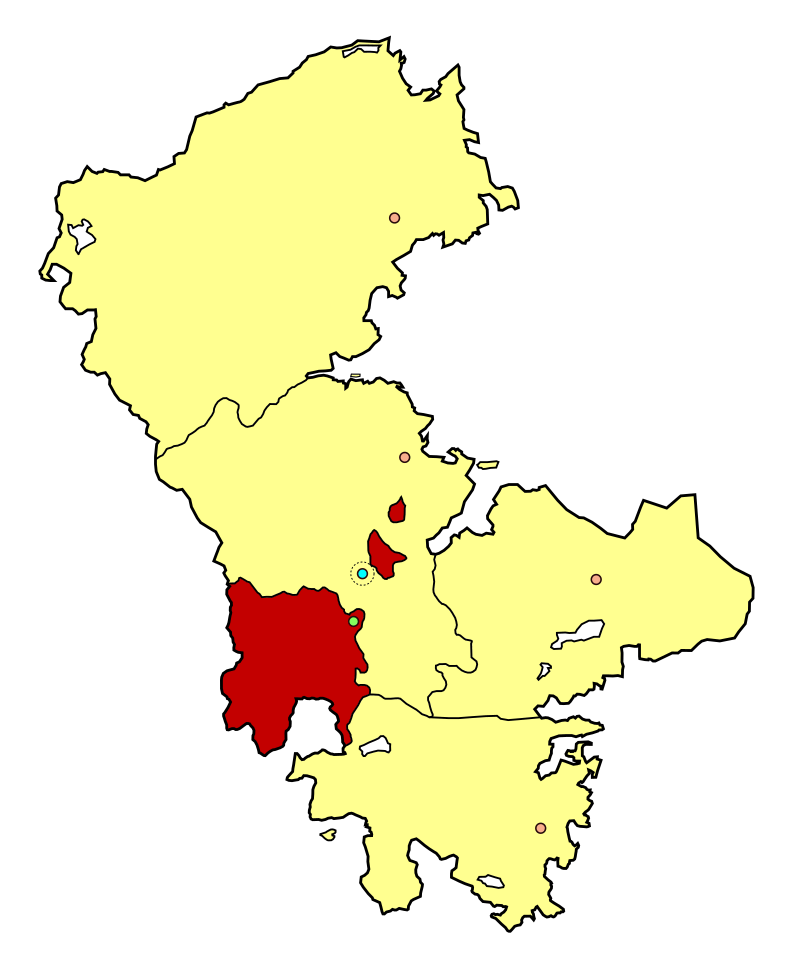
- Map of Shusha District within NKAO
- Autonomous region: (Azerbaijan Soviet Socialist Republic) Nagorno-Karabakh Autonomous Oblast
- Country: Azerbaijan SSR
- Established: 8 August 1930
- Abolished: 26 November 1991
- Capital: Shusha

Population (1979)
  - Total: 16,019

Shusha District (Azerbaijani: Şuşa rayonu, Шуша рајону; Armenian: Շուշիի շրջան) was an administrative unit within the former Nagorno-Karabakh Autonomous Oblast (NKAO) of the Azerbaijan Soviet Socialist Republic.

== History ==
The district was formed on 8 August 1930. Its capital was the city of Shusha. Shusha district was the only district in Nagorno-Karabakh Autonomous Oblast where Azerbaijanis formed a majority.

The Nagorno-Karabakh Autonomous Oblast was abolished on 26 November 1991.

Following the First Nagorno-Karabakh war, all of the district came under the control of the self-proclaimed Republic of Artsakh and was incorporated into its Shushi Province. However, following the Battle of Shusha during the 2020 Nagorno-Karabakh war, Azerbaijan recaptured the city of Shusha and several surrounding villages.

== Demographics ==
Year	Population	Ethnic groups	Source
1939	10,819	58.3% Azerbaijanis, 38.6% Armenians, 2.4% Russians	Soviet Census
1959	10,626	61.8% Azerbaijanis, 35.7% Armenians, 1.9% Russians	Soviet Census
1970	13,664	72.4% Azerbaijanis, 26.2% Armenians, 1.0% Russians	Soviet Census
1979	16,019	80.9% Azerbaijanis, 18.0% Armenians, 0.7% Russians	Soviet Census
