= Shusha District =

District in western Azerbaijan

Coordinates: 39°45′N 46°45′E

- District
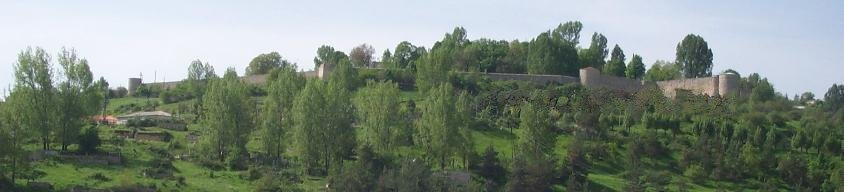

- Map of Azerbaijan showing Shusha District
- Country: Azerbaijan
- Region: Karabakh
- Established: 8 August 1930
- Capital: Shusha
- Settlements: 39

Government
  - Governor: Bayram Safarov

Area
  - Total: 310 km^{2} (120 sq mi)

Population (2020)
  - Total: 34,700
  - Density: 110/km^{2} (290/sq mi)
- Time zone: UTC+4 (AZT)
- Postal code: 5800
- Website: shusha-ih.gov.az

Shusha District (Azerbaijani: Şuşa rayonu) is one of the 66 districts of Azerbaijan. It is located in the west of the country and belongs to the Karabakh Economic Region. The district borders the districts of Khojaly, Lachin, and Khojavend. Its capital and largest city is Shusha. As of 2020, the district had a nominal population of 34,700. Finally villages of Malıbəyli, Aşağı Quşçular and Yuxarı Quşçular were transferred to Khojaly District according to passing law in 5 December 2023.

== History ==
Shusha District administration building

The district was formerly part of the Shusha District of the Nagorno-Karabakh Autonomous Oblast (NKAO) of Azerbaijan SSR during the Soviet times. It was the only district of NKAO to have an Azerbaijani majority with a significant Armenian minority.

The district came under the control of the Armenian forces during the First Nagorno-Karabakh War and was made part of the Shushi Province of the self-proclaimed Republic of Artsakh. However, in 2020, parts of the district, including its capital, Shusha, were recaptured by Azerbaijan in November 2020 following a 44-day battle during the 2020 Nagorno-Karabakh war. Remaining part of it was put under Russian peacekeeping control. After the 2023 Azerbaijani offensive in Nagorno-Karabakh, the entire district fell under the control of Azerbaijan after the capitulation of the Artsakh Defence Army in the area.

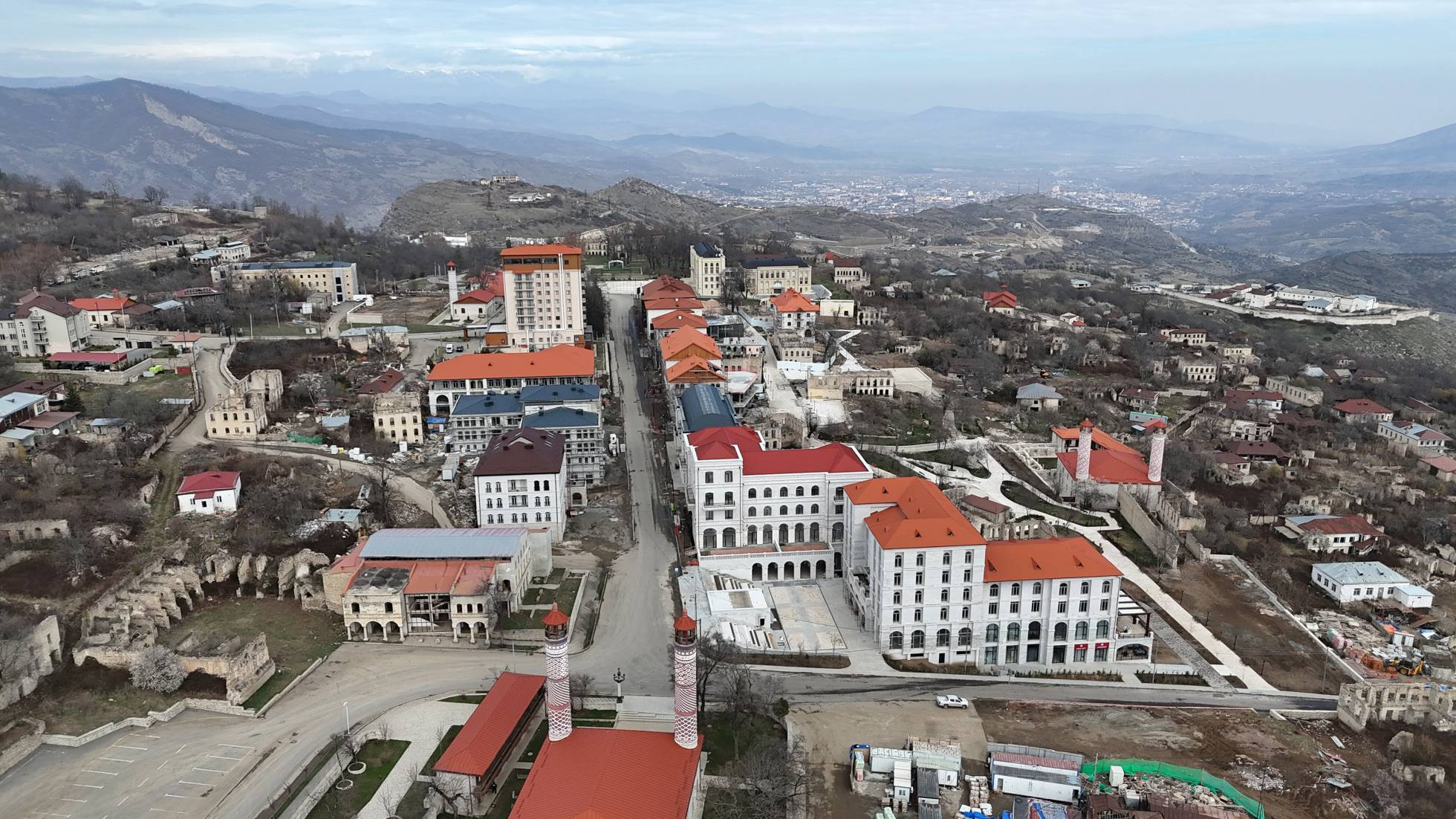
Shusha city in March, 2025

== Notable residents ==
- Mir Mohsun Navvab, artist and poet
- Khurshidbanu Natavan, poet
- Sadigjan, musician, inventor of the Azeri variety of tar
- Gasim bey Zakir, poet
- Khudadat bey Malik-Aslanov, scientist and politician
- Najaf bey Vazirov, playwright and journalist
- Bulbul, folk and opera singer
- Bulbuljan, folk singer
- Muratsan (1854–1908), Armenian writer and novelist.
- Leo (1860–1932), Armenian historian.
- Stepan Aghajanian (1863–1940), Armenian painter.
- Hambardzum Arakelian (1865–1918), Armenian journalist and public activist.
- Alexander Atabekian (1868–1933), prominent Armenian anarchist.
- Vartan Sarkisov (1875–1955), Soviet-Armenian architect.
- Freidun Aghalyan (1876–1944), Armenian architect.
- Tuman Tumanian (1879–1906), Armenian liberation movement leader.
- Abdurrahim Hagverdiyev, dramatist
- Yusif Vazir Chamanzaminli (1887-1943 in the GULAG, near Gorky, Russia), core author of the novel Ali and Nino, published under the pseudonym Kurban Said
- Karim bey Mehmandarov, doctor and social activist
- Khan Shushinski, folk singer
- Shamsi Badalbeyli, theatre director and actor
- Suleyman Sani Akhundov, Azerbaijani playwright, journalist, children's author, and teacher (3 October 1875, Shusha – 29 March 1939, Baku)
- Ahmad Agdamski, Azerbaijani opera singer, mugam singer and actor (5 January 1884, Shusha – 1 April 1954 Agdash)
- Soltan Hajibeyov, Azerbaijani composer and People's Artist of the USSR (5 May 1919 Shusha – 19 September 1974 Baku)
- Uzeyir Hajibeyov (1885–1948), founder of Azerbaijani composed music
- Jabbar Garyagdioglu, Azerbaijani folk singer (khananda) (31 March 1861 Shusha – 20 April 1944 Baku)
- Seyid Shushinski, Azerbaijani folk singer (khananda) (12 April 1889, Horadiz – 1 November 1965, Baku)
- Arsen Terteryan (1882–1953), Soviet-Armenian scientist.
- Artashes Babalian (1886–1959), a politician of the First Republic of Armenia.
- Sahak Ter-Gabrielyan (1886–1937), Soviet-Armenian statesman.
- Hayk Gyulikekhvyan (1886–1951), Armenian literary critic.
- Ashot Hovhannisyan (1887–1972), Soviet-Armenian statesman and historian.
- Mikael Arutchian (1897–1961), Soviet-Armenian painter.
- Ivan Knunyants (1906–1990), Soviet-Armenian chemist.
- Gevork Kotiantz (1909–1996), Soviet-Armenian painter.
- Shamsi Badalbeyli (1911–1987), Soviet-Azerbaijani actor and theatre director.
- Nelson Stepanyan (1913–1944), Soviet-Armenian pilot and Lieutenant–Colonel of the Red Army.
- Gurgen Boryan (1915–1971), Soviet-Armenian poet and playwright.
- Seyran Ohanyan (born 1962), Armenian politician and military commander.
- Aram Manukian (1879–1919), Armenian revolutionary leader
- Feyzullah Mirza Qajar (1872–1920), prince of Iran's Qajar dynasty. Major general in the Russian Empire and the Azerbaijan Democratic Republic, later military figure and politician in Iran.
- Latif Karimov, Azerbaijani carpet designer known for his contributions to a variety of artistic fields.(17 November 1906, Shusha – 1991, Baku)
- Avan Yuzbashi, (1670s–1735), Armenian military and political leader during Davit Bek uprising (1720s)
- Molla Panah Vagif, Poet the minister of foreign affairs in the Karabakh Khanate
- Ibrahim Khalil Khan (1732–1806), Azerbaijani khan of the Karabakh Khanate.
- Mehdigulu Khan Vefa, lyrical poet of Azerbaijan, lieutenant colonel in the Russian Army, son of a famous Karabakh poet Khurshidbanu Natavan (1855 Shusha – 1900 1900 Tiflis)
- Mir Hasan Vazirov, Azerbaijani revolutionary and one of the 26 Baku Commissars
