= 777th Special Forces Regiment =

- 777-ci Azərbaycan Xüsusi Təyinat Alayı
- Founded: 3 January 1992
- Country: Azerbaijan
- Branch: Azerbaijani Land Forces
- Type: Special forces
- Role: Direct Action; Unconventional Warfare
- Part of: Azerbaijan Armed Forces
- Garrison/HQ: Baku
- Nickname(s): "Afghan" "Three Sevens"

The 777th Special Forces Regiment is a special forces unit in the Azerbaijani Land Forces.

== History ==
=== First Karabakh War ===
A special-purpose battalion (Military Unit 777) was created on 1 January 1992. Lieutenant Colonel Elchin Mammadov was appointed commander of the unit. The first composition of the battalion consisted of 32 officers who served in the Soviet–Afghan War in the Soviet Army. Therefore, the battalion was also often nicknamed "Afghan". Senior Lieutenant Rovshan Akperov was appointed deputy battalion commander. The formation of the battalion took place in Baku. While the battalion was being formed, by order of the Minister of Defense at the time Tajaddin Mehdiyev), a reconnaissance group of the unit headed by Vagif Musayev was sent to Shusha.

In January 1992, the unit carried out an operation to seize 7 IFVs of the 295th Motor Rifle Division of the former Soviet 4th Army. At the beginning of February 1992, the 777th, consisting of 30 officers and 20 soldiers, was redeployed to Shusha to defend the city. Arriving in the city, the battalion immediately began to carry out the tasks assigned to it, with those including reconnaissance and sabotage operations behind enemy lines, as well as escorting columns from Lachin to Shusha. The next day after the capture of Shusha, a group of Azerbaijani troops was encircled in Zarysly Settlement, after which the 777th launched an attack on enemy positions and helped the regular Azerbaijani Army break out of the encirclement. The 777th was then sent to Nakhchivan to take part in the defense of the Sadarak District.

From June 1992 to June 1993, the 777th was stationed in the autonomous republic and around that time, Rovshan Akbarov was appointed the commander of the 777th. On June 28, 1993, the battalion was transferred to the Ağdam, and then to Fuzuli two months later. Soon the 777th was withdrawn to the rear and reorganized into the 777th Motorized Rifle Regiment. Colonel Akperov remained in command. After undergoing reorganization and training, the 777th became one of the most combat-ready military units of the Azerbaijani Army, taking up to the role of being a shock and assault unit.

=== Post-1994 ===
After the signing of the Bishkek Protocol, the 777th continued to serve on the front line and was subsequently reorganized. Personnel from the regiment took part in the 2016 Nagorno-Karabakh conflict.

== Decorated servicemen ==
Ten fighters of the unit were awarded the title "National Hero of Azerbaijan". Colonel Rovshan Akbarov served in the unit from 1992 to 1997 subsequently received the rank of lieutenant general, becoming the commander of the Baku Army Corps and the Shamkir Army Corps.

== See also ==
- Special Forces of Azerbaijan
- 641st Special Warfare Naval Unit
