= 49th Rifle Division (Soviet Union) =

- Active: 1931–1946, 1955–1957
- Country: Soviet Union
- Branch: Red Army; Soviet Army
- Type: Infantry
- Size: Division
- Engagements: World War II; Winter War; Eastern Front; Operation Barbarossa; Battle of Stalingrad; Battle of Kursk; Vistula-Oder Offensive; Battle of Berlin
- Decorations: Order of Lenin (3rd formation) Order of the Red Banner Order of Suvorov, 2nd class (2nd & 3rd formation)
- Battle honours: Roslavl (2nd formation); Kherson (3rd formation)

Commanders
- Notable commanders: Pyotr Bogdanovich

The 49th Rifle Division was a Soviet Army infantry division, formed three times. First formed as a territorial division in 1931, the 49th Rifle Division's first formation became a regular division by 1939 and fought in the Winter War. For its actions during the war, it was awarded the Order of the Red Banner. However, the 49th Rifle Division was wiped out during the first ten days of Operation Barbarossa. Its second formation occurred in December 1941 and fought at Stalingrad, Kursk, the Vistula-Oder Offensive and the Battle of Berlin. The second formation was disbanded in 1946. The division was reformed in 1955 by renaming the 295th Rifle Division and became the 49th Motor Rifle Division in 1957.

== History ==
=== First formation ===
The 49th Rifle Division was formed in September 1931 in Kostroma as a territorial division. In April 1938, it was transferred to recruiting duties in the Leningrad Military District at Staraya Russa. The division was used to form the 123rd and 142nd Rifle Divisions in September 1939. At this time, the division briefly became part of the Novgorod Group of Forces. On 14 September, it became part of the 7th Army. The division was transported by rail from Byanchaninovo and Chersky stations beginning on 25 October. After reaching the Latvian border, the division was sent to the Karelian Isthmus at Toksovo and Peri. The division was subordinated to the 50th Rifle Corps. On 30 November, it crossed the Finish border in the direction of Taipaleenjoki. On 3 December, it attacked Terenttila while attempting to gain a bridgehead over the Taipaleenjoki. Due to the speed of the Soviet advance, a spearhead group, called the "Right Group" was formed from divisions of the 50th Rifle Corps and included the division. By 13 December, the division held a bridgehead on Cape Koukkuniemi. The attack from the bridgehead began on 15 December. The offensive met little success advancing against the main Finnish defensive line and the division suffered heavy losses. On 24 December, the division attacked again but was repulsed. It became part of the 13th Army on 26 December. From 13 January 1940, it was part of the 3rd Rifle Corps. In February, it fought in the Battle of Taipale. On 8 February, two battalions of the division captured two Finnish bases at Terenttilä, repulsing several Finnish counterattacks. The division's reconnaissance battalion was detached for an outflanking attempt across the ice of Lake Ladoga but was repulsed by Finnish fire on 18 February. On 19 February, the division pushed all Finnish troops out of their positions in the remaining unoccupied part of Terentitila. It broke through the Mannerheim Line positions on 20 February but was repulsed by a Finnish counterattack after advancing a kilometer. On 7 April, it was awarded the Order of the Red Banner for its action during the war. After the end of the Winter War, the division was sent to the Baltic states on 13 June. It participated in the invasion of Estonia from 17 June. In July and August 1940, the division relocated to Belarus.

The division was subordinated to the 4th Army's 28th Rifle Corps near Brest. In the fall of 1940, most of the Winter War combat veterans were demobilized, reportedly leaving the division manned by inexperienced younger personnel. During the spring of 1941, there was an increased priority on building fortifications. As a result of this, less time was spent on combat training. On 22 June 1941, the beginning of the German attack on the Soviet Union in Operation Barbarossa, the division was headquartered at the border station near Vysoko . The division was pushed back by the German XLIII Army Corps and destroyed by the first week of the war. The division was scattered and surrounded in the Białowieża Forest by 28 June. The last resistance was able to hold out until 3 July. It was officially disbanded on 19 September.

=== Second formation ===
In December 1941, the Ivanovo Communist Division of the People's Militia was renamed the 49th Rifle Division. In March 1942, the division was sent to the Moscow Defense Zone and remained there until August. It was then transferred to the 8th Reserve Army, which soon became the 66th Army. The division fought at the Barrikady Factory during Operation Uranus. It also participated in Operation Koltso during January 1943. The division was then withdrawn from the front to rebuild and sent to the 16th Army in February. In April, the division was moved to the 50th Army. During July, it fought in Operation Kutuzov. From August, it fought in Operation Suvorov with the 10th Army. The division fought in the capture of Roslavl in September. For its actions, it was awarded the honorific "Roslavl" on 25 September.

The division transferred to the 49th Army in April 1944. It fought in Operation Bagration, the Soviet offensive in Belarus, from late June, attacking Minsk and Grodno. On 27 June, it was part of 2nd Belorussian Front reserves and was concentrated near Zhdanovichi. The division reportedly advanced 700 kilometers between the start of the offensive and the division's withdrawal from the front in September. The division became part of the 33rd Army's 62nd Rifle Corps in October. In January, the division fought in the Vistula–Oder Offensive and advanced to the Oder near Frankfurt am Oder. On 19 February, it was awarded the Order of the Red Banner for its actions during the offensive. It continued to advance and in April took part in the Berlin Offensive. On 5 April, it was awarded the Order of Suvorov 2nd class for its actions during the offensive. The division finished the war on the Elbe near Dessau. As part of the Group of Soviet Forces in Germany, the division was ordered to disband on 29 May 1945. However, it actually disbanded in June 1946.

=== Third formation ===
In 1955, the 295th Rifle Division was renamed the 49th Rifle Division at Stavropol with the North Caucasus Military District. In the summer of 1956 it moved to Baku and was subordinated to the Transcaucasian Military District. The 49th's third formation inherited the honors of the 295th Rifle Division. The division's full title was the 49th Kherson Red Banner Orders of Lenin & Suvorov Rifle Division. It became the 49th Motor Rifle Division in 1957 during the Soviet Army reorganization.

== Commanders ==
The following officers commanded the division.

- Kombrig (Brigade commander) Pavel Ivanovich Vorobiev (1935–1940)
- Colonel Konstantin Fedorovich Vasilyev (11 July 1940 – 26 July 1941)
- Colonel Logwin Chernovy (8 January-20 February 1942)
- Major General Pavel Firsov (21 February 1942 – 5 June 1942)
- Major General Mikhail Dodonov (17 June 1942 – 25 September 1942)
- Major General Pyotr Matvienko (26 September 1942 – 21 October 1942)
- Major General Alexander Nikiforovich Chernikov (22 October-27 November 1942)
- Colonel (promoted to Major General 1 September 1943) Alexander Chizhov (28 November 1942 – 4 June 1944)
- Major General Pyotr Bogdanovich (5 June 1944 – 9 May 1945)

== Composition ==
On 22 June 1941, the division was composed of the following units.

- 15th Rifle Regiment
- 212th Rifle Regiment
- 222nd Rifle Regiment
- 36th Artillery Regiment
- 166th Howitzer Artillery Regiment
- 121st Separate Antitank Battalion
- 291st Separate Antiaircraft Artillery Battalion
- 91st Reconnaissance Battalion
- 1st Sapper Battalion
- 79th Separate Communications Battalion
- 85th Medical & Sanitary Battalion
- 132nd Separate Chemical Defence Company
- 85th Motor Transport Battalion
- 97th Field Mobile Bakery
- 65th Divisional Artillery Workshop
- 469th Field Post Office
- 140th Field Ticket Office of the State Bank

The 49th Rifle Division's second formation included the following units.

- 15th Rifle Regiment (until 20 June 1943)
- 212th Rifle Regiment
- 222nd Rifle Regiment
- 551st Rifle Regiment (after 20 June 1943)
- 31st Artillery Regiment
- 121st Separate Antitank Battalion
- 103rd Mortar Battalion (until 13 November 1942)
- 217th Intelligence Company
- 1st Sapper Battalion
- 79th Separate Communications Battalion (became 896th Separate Communications Company)
- 85th Medical & Sanitary Battalion
- 505th Separate Chemical Defence Company
- 85th (later 111th) Trucking Company
- 421st Field Bakery
- 886th Divisional Veterinary Hospital
- 1722nd Field Post Office
- 1077th Field Ticket Office of the State Bank
