= Alisahib Huseynov =

Azerbaijani politician

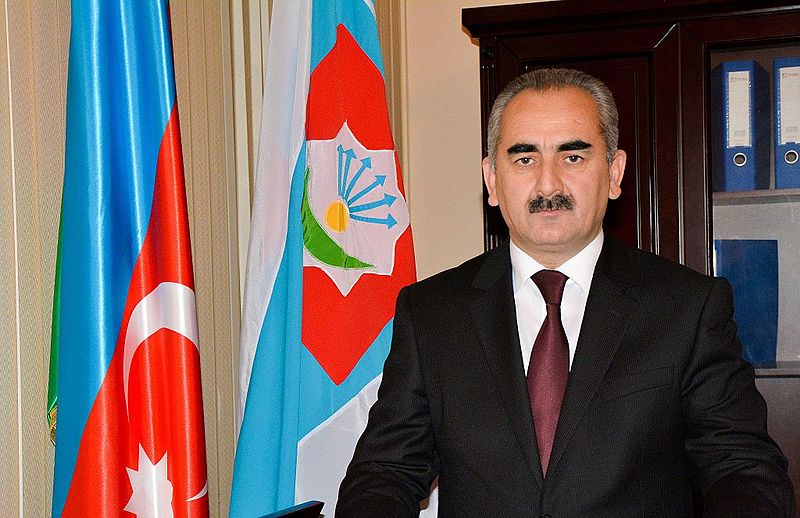
Əlisahib Hüseynov

Alisahib Vali Oglu Huseynov (born 13 February 1970 in Khanlig village, Qubadli rayon, Azerbaijan) is an Azerbaijani politician.

Huseynov joined the army in 1988, serving until 1990. From May 1991 he was deputy platoon commander of the voluntary self-defence squad of Khanlig. From 1992 to 1998, he served as a deputy platoon commander in other military units, and was deputy commander of various staffs. In 2010, Huseynov established the Az i Ya film LLC. He is one of the co-founders of the University Georgia-Azerbaijan.

Huseynov is married and has 3 children.

== Education ==
Huseynov graduated from Baku State University with degrees in history (1996–2001) and law (2001–2005).

== Political activity ==
In 2008, Huseynov became a member of the World of Democratic Azerbaijan political party. In March 2009, he was elected counselor of the chairman of the party. At the emergency congress held on 4 March 2013, Huseynov was unanimously elected chairman of the Party.

In 2007, the legal journal "Qanun" ("Law") published Huseynov's article "Comparative analyses of some aspects of the world countries' constitutions".
