= 295th Division =

295th Division may refer to:

- 295th Infantry Division (Wehrmacht), Germany
- 295th Motor Rifle Division, Soviet Union
- 295th Rifle Division, Soviet Union

== See also ==
- List of military divisions by number
