= Mərdanlı =

- Location within Azerbaijan
- Coordinates: 39°20′10″N 46°41′42″E
- Country: Azerbaijan
- District: Zangilan
- Time zone: UTC+4 (AZT)
  - Summer (DST): UTC+5 (AZT)

Mərdanlı is a village in the Qubadli Rayon of Azerbaijan. It was under the control of Armenian forces of the Nagorno-Karabakh, however, it was recaptured by the Azerbaijan Army on or around November 7, 2020.
