= Akbarov =

Akbarov (Russian: Акбаров) is a Russian surname. Notable people with the surname include:

- Bobirjon Akbarov, Uzbek footballer
- Marat Akbarov (born 1961), Soviet Russian pair skater
- Rovshan Akbarov, Azerbaijani general and military leader
