= 4th Army Corps (Azerbaijan) =

- Azerbaijani: 4-ci Ordu Korpusu
- Badge of the 4th Army Corps
- Active: circa 1992
- Country: Azerbaijan
- Branch: Azerbaijani Land Forces
- Garrison/HQ: Baku
- Nickname: "Baku Army Corps"

Commanders
- Chief of Staff: Fakhraddin Jabrayilov

The 4th Army Corps (Azerbaijani: 4-ci Ordu Korpusu), also referred to as the Baku Army Corps is a regional military formation of the Azerbaijani Land Forces, that covers Absheron Peninsula and the coast, currently deployed from the capital of Baku.

== Overview ==
The corps consists of three motorized rifle brigades: one at Zeynalabdin, one at Jusar, and another at an undisclosed location. Unlike the other corps, its role was mainly to serve as a strategic reserve. As a result, it is the smallest corps in the Land Forces Like the 3rd Corps, it will be used for replenishing the ranks of the 1st Corps. At the beginning of the 2020 Nagorno-Karabakh war, Azerbaijan lined up six additional motorized infantry brigades along the front line, with reservists being mobilized and transferred from the 4th Corps. At the Baku Victory Parade of 2020 on Azadliq Square, the corps was represented by a parade contingent led by Colonel Ilham Mammadov.

=== Facilities ===
A facilities in the village of Pirəkəşkül in the Absheron Rayon is the site of a missile base operated by the corps, opened in June 2018 by President Ilham Aliyev. The base houses Polonez-M and LORA missile systems. In January 2017, a new 42 hectare military camp is located at the corps. Construction work began here in May 2014 and was completed at the end of 2016. A total of 13 military dormitories were built. A 76-bed, two-story medical center also operates at the corps.

== Commanders ==
- Lieutenant General Rovshan Akbarov (May 1998-?)
- Colonel Hikmat Hasanov (until late 2013)
- Major General Karim Valiyev (until May 2014)
- Major General Ayaz Hasanov (October 2014-)
