= Azerbaijani Commando Brigades =

- Azərbaycan Komando briqadaları
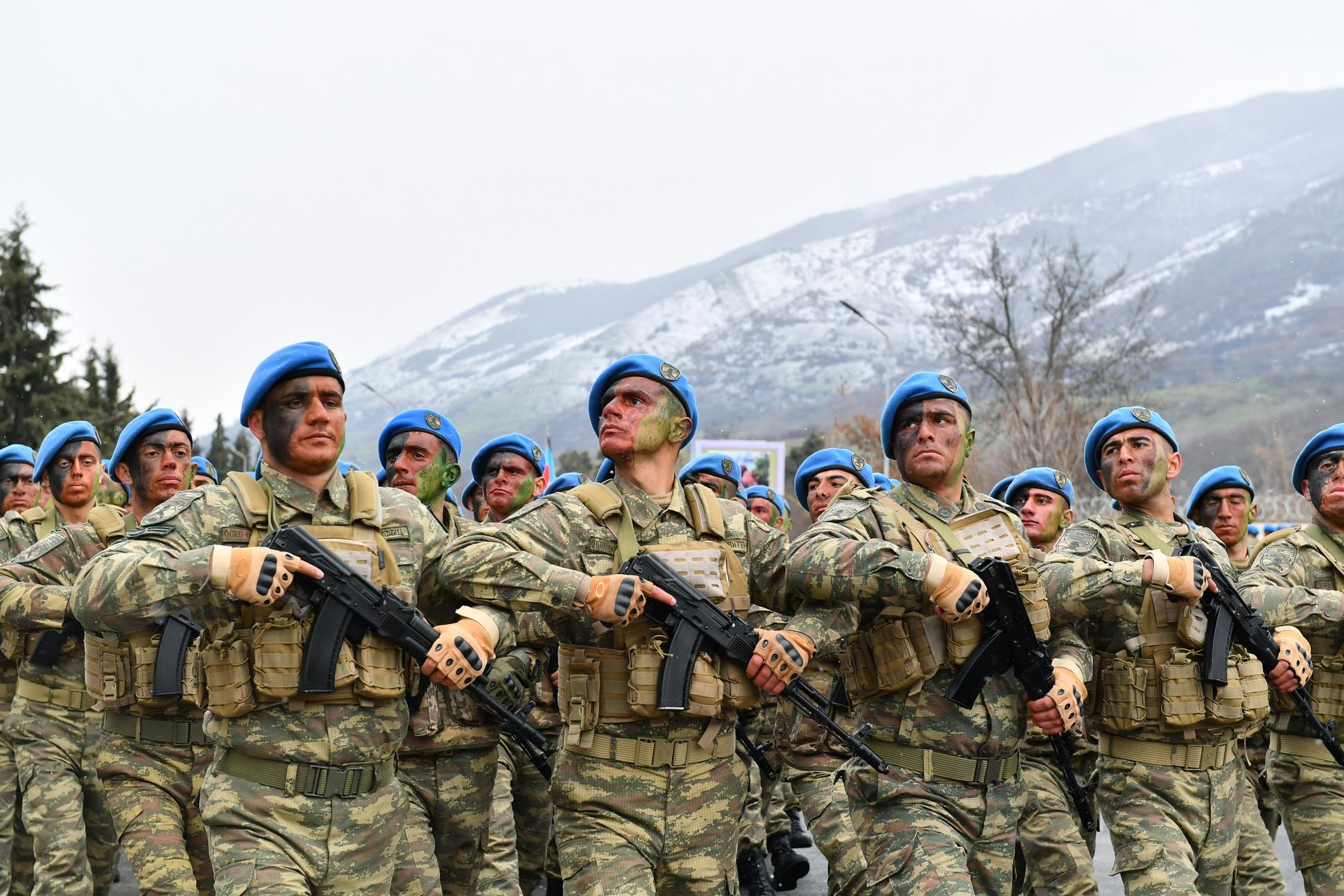
- Ceremonial formation of commando brigades in Hadrut, December 24, 2021.
- Founded: 2021–present
- Country: Azerbaijan
- Branch: Azerbaijani Land Forces
- Type: Commando
- Size: Brigade
- Garrison/HQ: Hadrut
- Nickname: Blue Berets
- Colors: Blue

Insignia
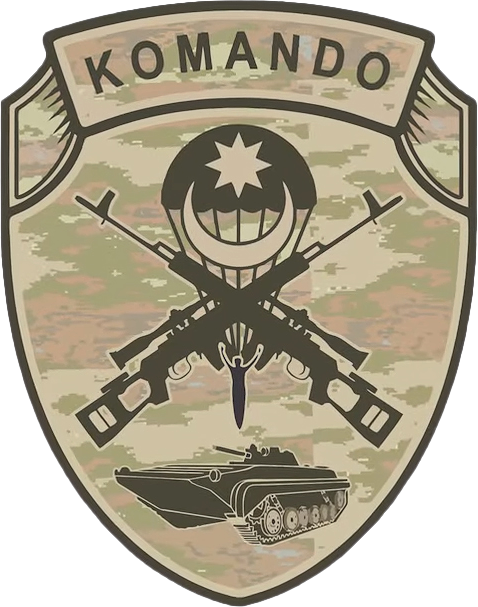
- Identification symbol

Azerbaijani Commando Brigades (Azerbaijani: Azərbaycan Komando briqadaları) are commando (special operations capable) units within the Armed Forces of Azerbaijan, formed in 2021 from the military personnel of the Land Forces who returned to Azerbaijan after training in the Turkish Armed Forces.

== History ==
The first commando brigades in Azerbaijan were created in 2021, following the Second Nagorno-Karabakh War. As part of this process, the staffing of the new army corps and the units of the Azerbaijani Land Forces subordinate to it was completed. From August 2021 to January 2022, Azerbaijan managed to create four new military commando units. These units were formed from Azerbaijani servicemen who returned from undergoing training in the Republic of Turkey.

The first commando military unit appeared on October 19, 2021, with the Minister of Defense of Azerbaijan, Colonel-General Zakir Hasanov, holding a ceremony was held to present berets to personnel who had completed a lengthy "Commando Training Course" (CTC) in Turkey. The commandos who were given the berets took part in the Second Karabakh War in the fall of 2020. On November 26, 2021, another commando military unit began operation and a month later a third unit, the 218th Commando Brigade, was created in the Hadrut settlement of Khojavend in a ceremony attended by the President of Azerbaijan Ilham Aliyev in connection with his birthday. In his speech, he touched upon the creation of commando brigades, stating:

"In Azerbaijan, not one, not two, but many commando brigades are being created, which are capable of fulfilling any military task. These brigades will be served by our children who have been well trained, have demonstrated high will and are ready to give their lives for their Motherland. This will greatly increase the power of our army. I want to say again that there will be many such brigades, thousands of our servicemen will serve in them. Thus, the Azerbaijani army will continue to maintain its professionalism and high morale."

— Ilham Aliyev

During the ceremony, a Presentation of Colours took place for the 218th. At the end of December 2021, in accordance with the combat training plan for 2021, special tactical exercises were held in the commando units. On Armed Forces Day 2022, the opening of the second commando military unit took place in Kalbajar.

== Structure and recruitment ==
The main difference between commando brigades and the special forces of the MoD is that along with officers and ensigns, specially trained soldiers also serve in commando forces, whereas in the Special Forces, only officers and ensigns serve. To qualify as a commando fighter, a soldier undergoes specialized training. The primary role of commando brigades involves carrying out combat missions in challenging landscapes. Military personnel serving in commando units receive instruction in various skills, including assault climber, combat and patrolling techniques in urban areas, combat and reconnaissance in river basin, commando style raids, CQB/CQC, defusing and disposal of bombs and land mines, desert warfare, fast tactical shooting, field intelligence gathering, hand-to-hand combat, HUMINT, infiltrate and exfil the area with a helicopter, irregular warfare, marksmanship, NBCR on operations in contaminated environments, parachuting, physical conditioning, reading a map and use compass for requesting artillery fire support and airstrike, SERE, special reconnaissance, skiing, sniper, support counterterrorism, and tactical first aid. Those who successfully complete the course are selected to join the commando brigade and are awarded berets as a symbol of their achievement.]

On 30 September 2022, the first graduation ceremony of the Commando Officer Initial Courses was held.

== Analysis and importance ==
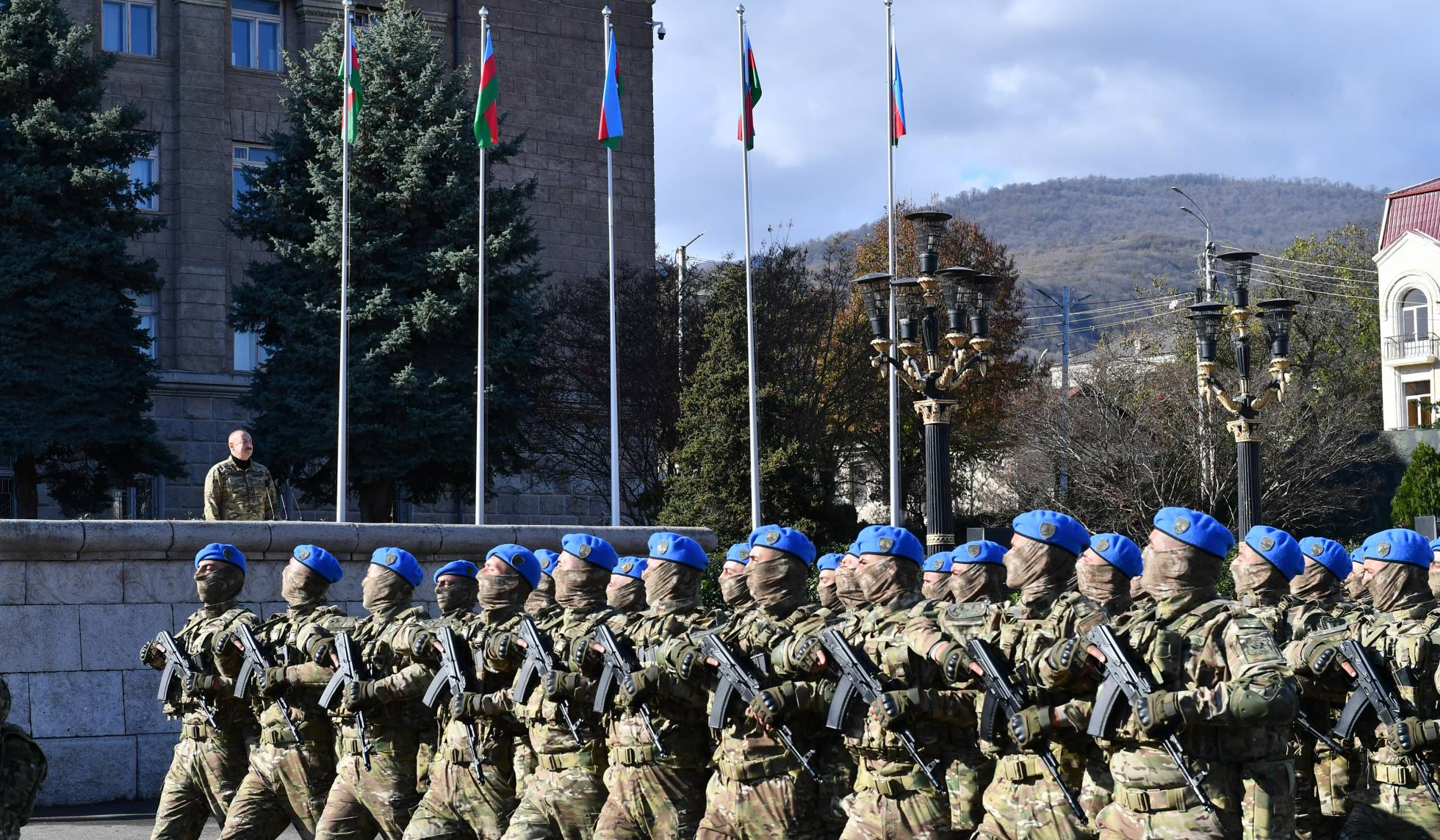
Azerbaijani Commandos marching past President Ilham Aliyev during the 2023 Victory Day parade, held in newly-conquered Stepanakert.

As per Adalat Verdiyev, a military expert from Azerbaijan, the establishment of military commando units commenced following a significant declaration regarding the adoption of the Turkish Land Forces model by the Azerbaijani military. Verdiyev emphasizes that the formation of commando brigades holds significance in terms of aligning the Azerbaijani and Turkish armies and facilitating coordinated command structures. Additionally, he suggests that the establishment of these brigades will help conserve some of the resources of Azerbaijan's Ministry of Defense Special Forces.

According to Russian military expert Igor Korotchenko, the creation of commando brigades is a new stage in the development of the Azerbaijani Armed Forces and increasing their combat effectiveness. Korotchenko also considers the creation of such brigades as Azerbaijan's military response to the continued presence of the Armenian Army in Karabakh.

== Gallery ==
Commando Exercises, 2021

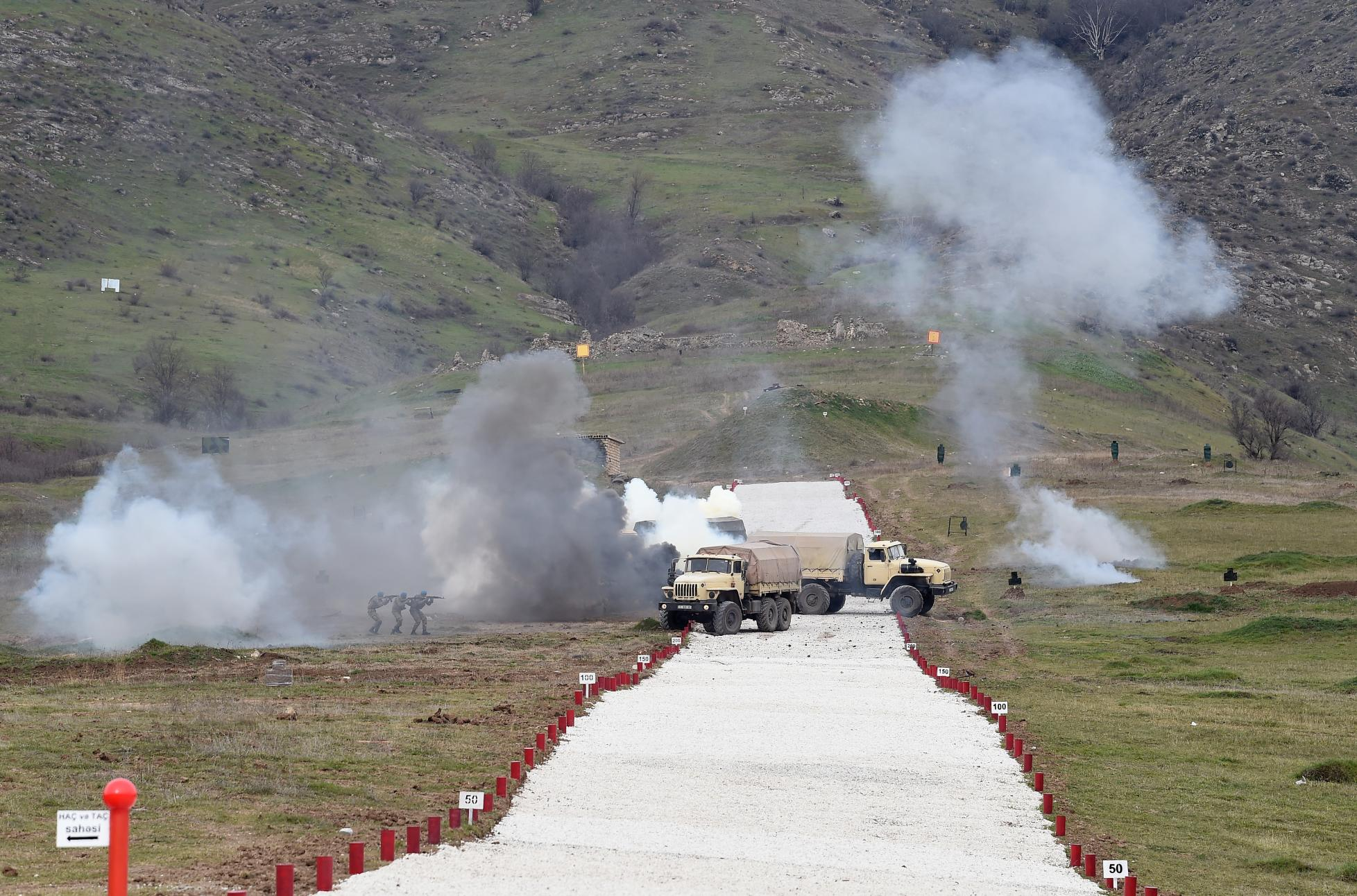

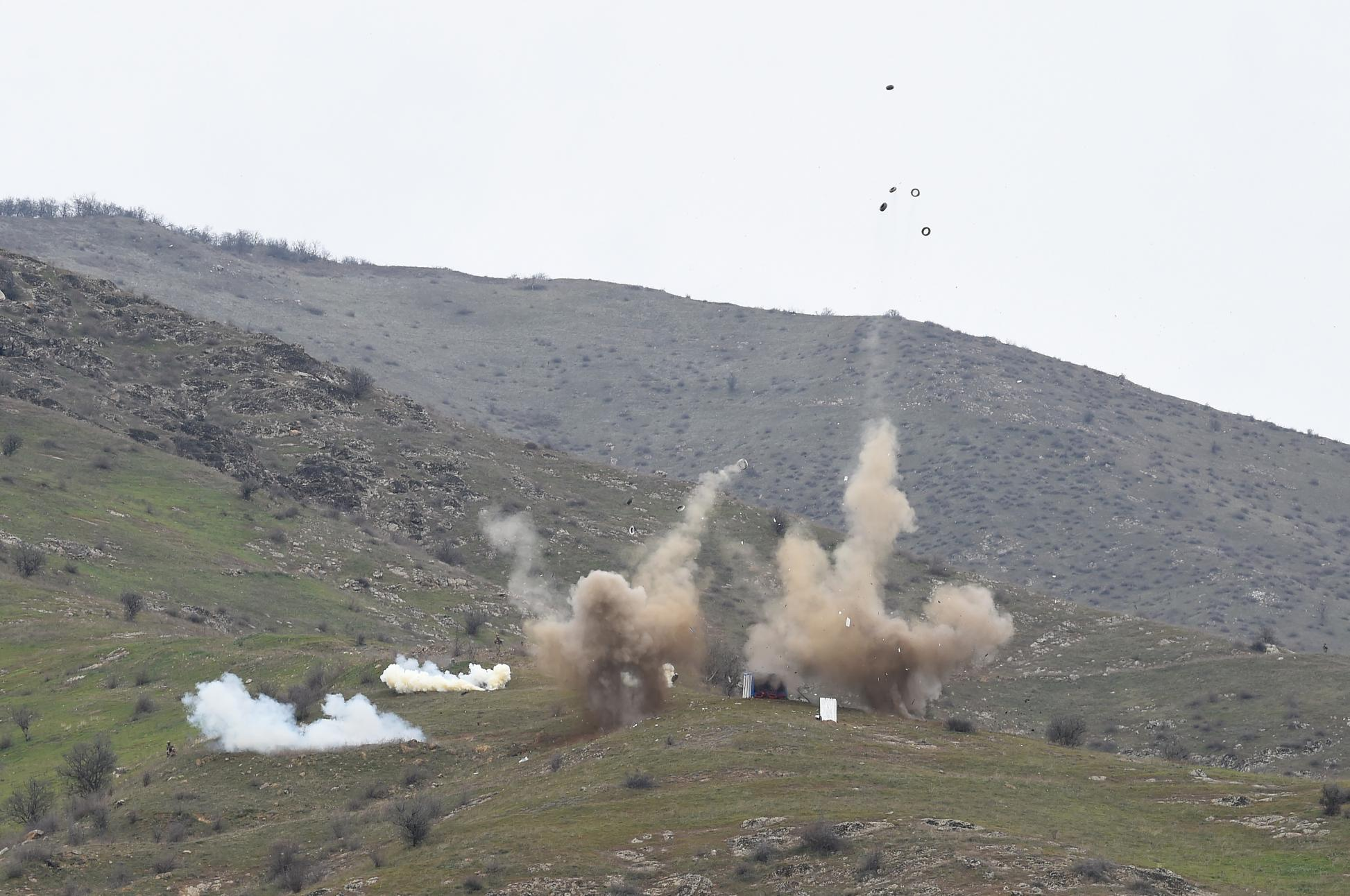

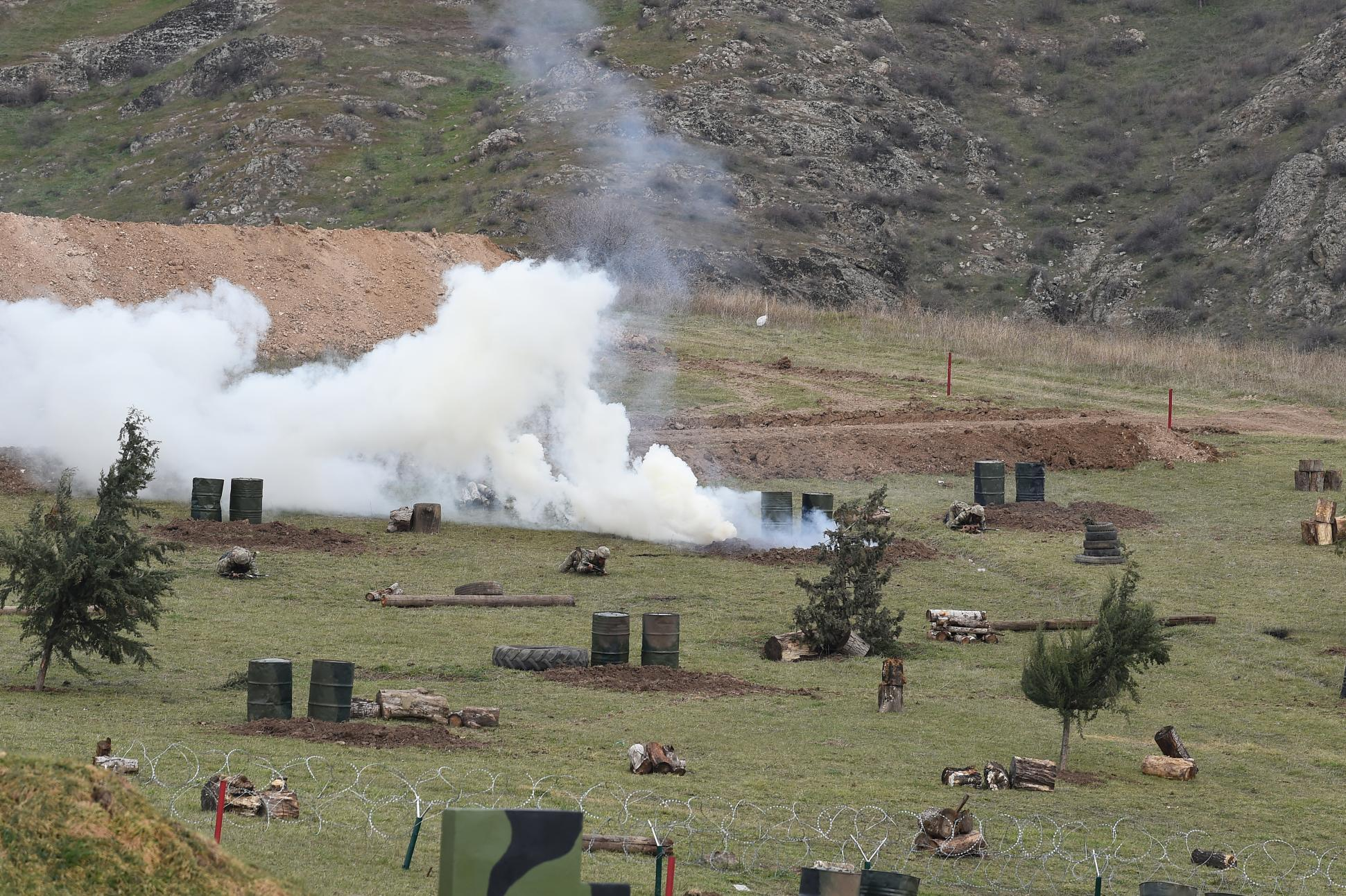

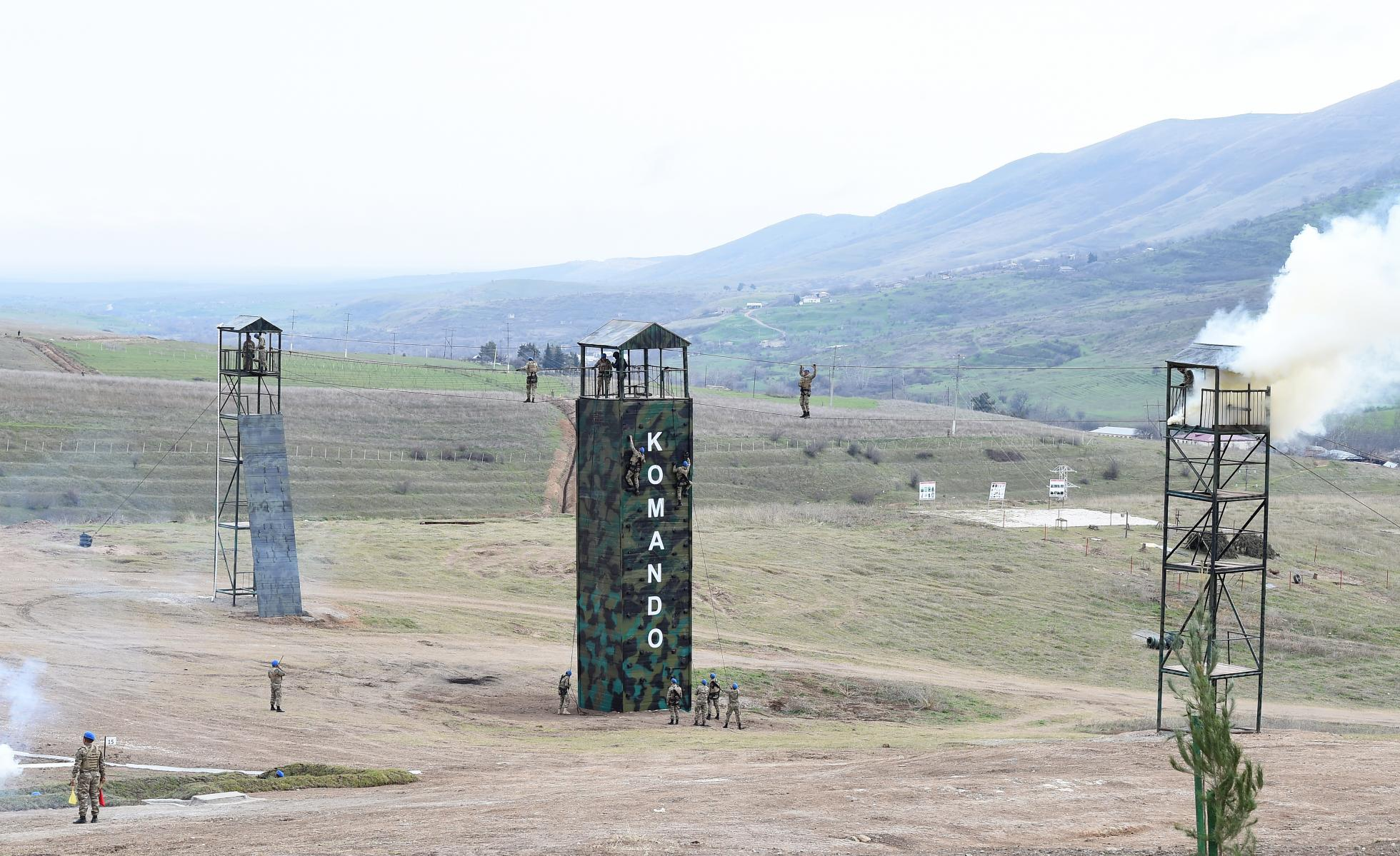

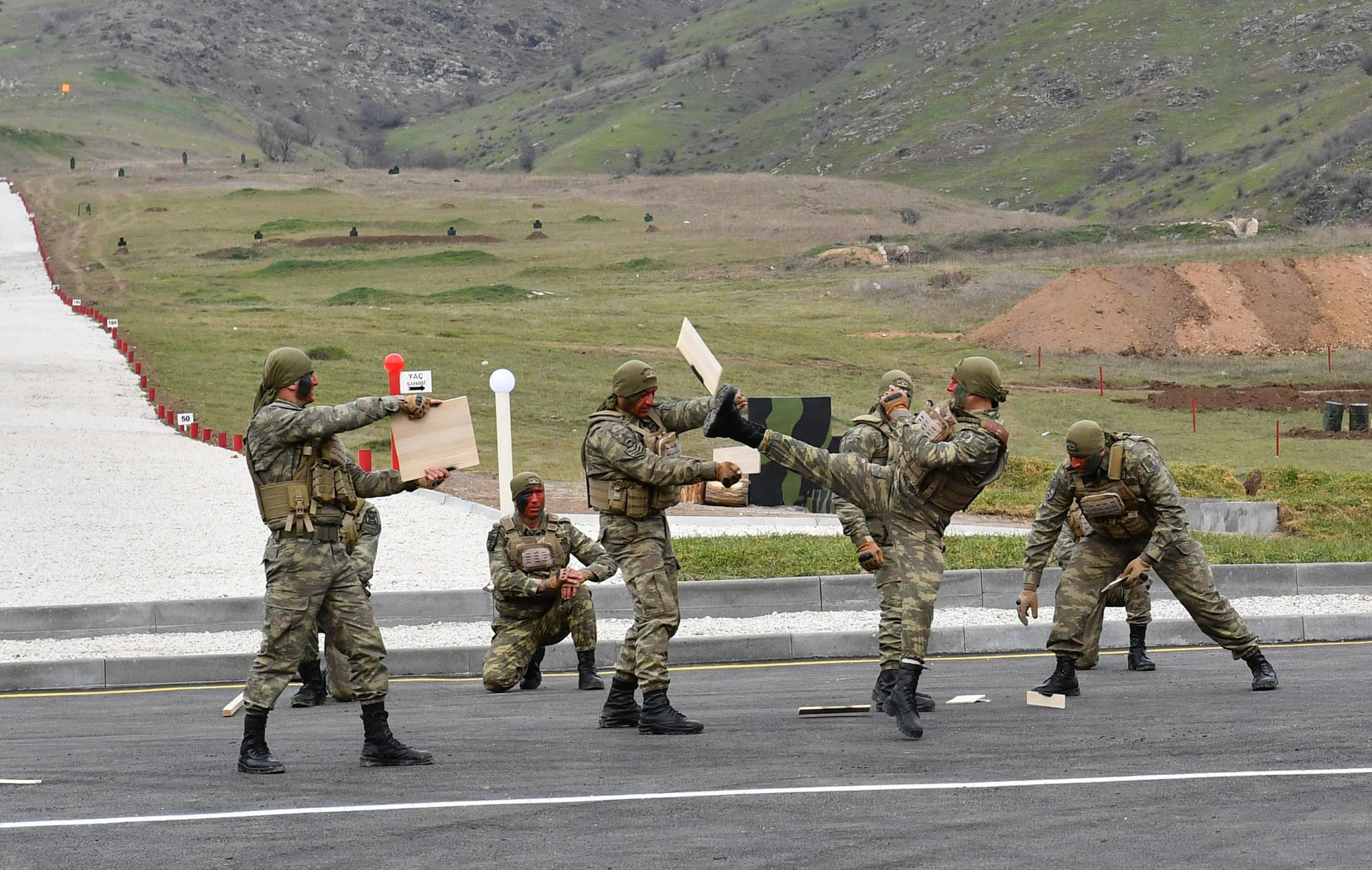

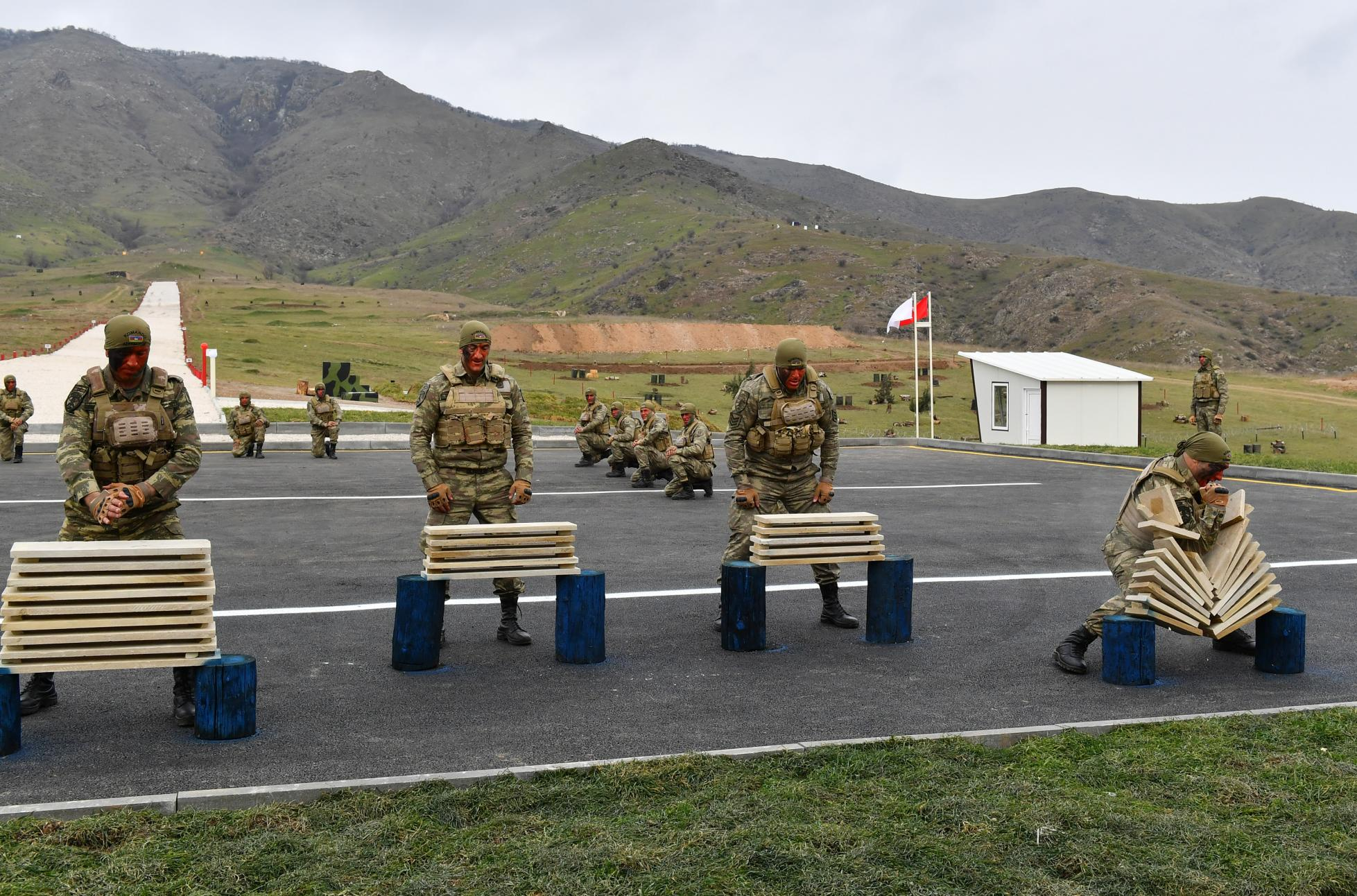

== See also ==
- Special Forces Command (Turkey)
- Spetsnaz
