= Zhdanovichy =

Zhdanovichy (Belarusian: Ждановічы) or Zhdanovichi (Russian: Ждановичи) may refer to the following places in Belarus:

- Zhdanovichy, Minsk District, an agrotown in Minsk District, Minsk Region
- Zhdanovichy, Stowbtsy District, a village in Stowbtsy District, Minsk Region
