= Rovshan Akbarov =

Azerbaijani military leader (born 1965)

National Hero of Azerbaijan Rovshan Akbarov
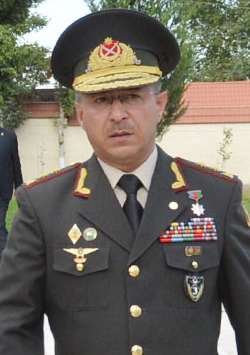
- Born: June 4, 1965 (age 61); Baku, Azerbaijan SSR, Soviet Union
- Military career
- Allegiance: USSR; Azerbaijan
- Branch: Azerbaijani Armed Forces
- Service years: 1982–2020
- Rank: Lieutenant General

Lieutenant General Rovshan Telman oghlu Akbarov (Azerbaijani: Rövşən Əkbərov Telman oğlu) is an Azerbaijani general and military leader.

== Early life and career ==
He was born in Baku in 1965. From 1972 to 1979, he received his secondary education in secondary school No.42. In 1979, he entered the Jamshid Nakhchivanski Military Lyceum. In 1982 he entered the Kiev Higher Combined Arms Command School. After graduating, he went serve in the Soviet Army's Transcaucasian Military District, where he was appointed commander of a platoon in the 342th Motorized Rifle Regiment of the 75th Motor Rifle Division in Nakhchivan.

In 1987, he was sent to serve in Afghanistan during the Soviet–Afghan War. In 1988, he returned to the Azerbaijan Soviet Socialist Republic, where he became the head of a unit in the 409th Motorized Rifle Regiment.

== Azerbaijani Army ==
During the First Nagorno-Karabakh War, he worked as an assistant to the military commissar of the Beylagan District, and later in various positions in the Azerbaijani Armed Forces. From 1992 to 1993, he was deputy commander of the 777th Special Forces Regiment, later commanding the unit until 1997. Akbarov was a participant in the suppression of the rebellion of the OPON unit under the leadership of Rovshan Javadov in March 1995. He was appointed Deputy Chief of the Personnel and Military Education Department of the Ministry in 1997, and in May 1998, he was appointed corps commander for the Baku Army Corps. He was a student of the Baku Higher Naval School in 1999 and the Ukrainian Military Academy in 2002. After returning from Ukraine, he was promoted to lieutenant general. He became the commander of the 3rd Shamkir Army Corps in 2011.

== Criticism ==
Akbarov was said to be a supporter of the embattled former Chief of the General Staff, Najmeddin Sadikov. Like Sadikov, he has been commonly accused of treason on social media, and particularly during the July 2020 Armenian–Azerbaijani clashes. There were also a number of rumours about Sadikov and Akbarov circulating on social media, claiming that they had collaborated with the Armenian Armed Forces and were responsible for non-combat deaths in the army.

== Retirement and arrest ==
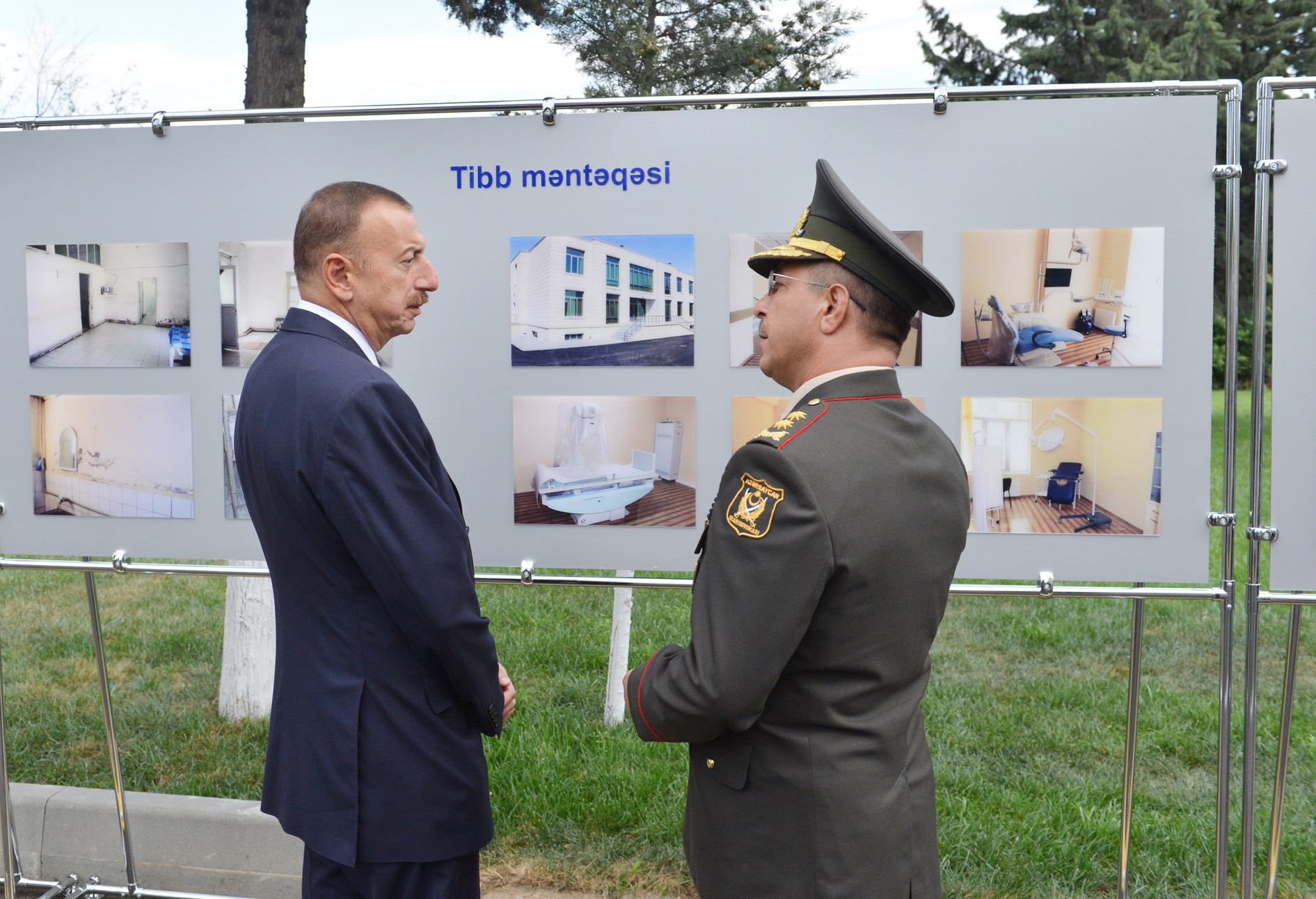
Rovshan Akbarov and Ilham Aliyev at the corps

In February 2020, he was sent to the reserve along with Major General Khaghani Jabrayilov by order of the Minister of Defense, Colonel General Zakir Hasanov. A year later, Akbarov was arrested for allegedly killing businessman Elchin Aliyev in Ukraine. He was arrested on 3 March in a criminal case investigated by the Investigation Department of the General Prosecutor's Office.

== Awards and titles ==
- National Hero of Azerbaijan (October 1994)
- Azerbaijani Flag Order (twice)
