= Güzdək =

- Municipality
- Location within Azerbaijan
- Coordinates: 40°29′44″N 49°40′35″E
- Country: Azerbaijan
- Rayon: Absheron

Population
  - Total: 2,145
- Time zone: UTC+4 (AZT)
  - Summer (DST): UTC+5 (AZT)

Güzdək (also, Gyuzdek) is a village and municipality in the Absheron Rayon of Azerbaijan. It has a population of 2,145.
