= Zhdanovichy, Stowbtsy district =

Village in Minsk Region, Belarus

Zhdanovichy Ждановічы (Belarusian) Ждановичи (Russian)
- Village
- Location within Belarus
- Coordinates: 53°36′35″N 26°50′22″E
- Country: Belarus
- Region: Minsk Region
- District: Stowbtsy District
- Time zone: UTC+3 (MSK)

Zhdanovichy (Belarusian: Ждановічы, romanized: Ždanovičy; Russian: Ждановичи, romanized: Zhdanovichi) is a village in Stowbtsy District, Minsk Region, Belarus. It is administratively part of Rubyazhevichy selsoviet; previously it was part of Zasullye selsoviet until 2013. It is located southwest of the capital Minsk.
