= Azerbaijani Land Forces =

Branch of the Azerbaijani Armed Forces

Azerbaijan Land Forces
- Azərbaycan Silahlı Qüvvələri Quru Qoşunları
- Badge of the Azerbaijan Land Forces
- Founded: 1918; 108 years ago (Establishment); 1992; 34 years ago (Re-establishment)
- Country: Azerbaijan
- Branch: Land Forces
- Size: IISS 2013: 85,000
- Part of: Azerbaijan Armed Forces
- Headquarters: Baku
- March: "Forward" (Marş "İrəli")
- Engagements: First Nagorno-Karabakh War; Second Nagorno-Karabakh war

Commanders
- President and Commander-in-Chief: Ilham Aliyev
- Minister of Defence: Colonel general Zakir Hasanov
- Commander of the Azerbaijani Land Forces: Colonel general Hikmat Mirzayev

Insignia
- Flag of the Azerbaijani Land Forces

The Azerbaijani Land Forces (Azerbaijani: Azərbaycan Silahlı Qüvvələri Quru Qoşunları) are the land force branch of the Azerbaijani Armed Forces. Since the fall of the Soviet Union, Azerbaijan has been trying to create professional, well trained, and mobile armed forces. Based on 2013 statistics, the country has about 85,000 ground force troops, with additional paramilitary forces of 15,000. In addition, there are 300,000 former service personnel who have had military service in the last fifteen years.

Reportedly, in wartime, the Army proper could call upon the support of the National Guard, the Internal Troops of Azerbaijan, and the State Border Service. The exact wartime command structure remains unclear.

== History ==
During the Soviet period, Azerbaijan was part of the Transcaucasus Military District, whose forces in the republic were commanded by the 4th Army. The 4th Army consisted of three motor rifle divisions (the 23rd Guards Motor Rifle Division (MRD) at Ganja, the 60th Motor Rifle Division at Lankaran, and the 295th Motor Rifle Division in Baku), plus army troops that included missile and air defence brigades and artillery and rocket regiments. Azerbaijan also hosted the 49th Arsenal of the Main Missile and Artillery Directorate, which contained over 7,000 train-car loads of ammunition holding in excess of one billion units of ammunition and stores. In addition, the 75th Motor Rifle Division, part of the 7th Guards Army, was in the Nakhchivan Autonomous Republic.

In summer 1992, the Defence Ministry of Azerbaijan, following a resolution by the Azerbaijani president on the nationalisation of units and formations in Azerbaijani territory, forwarded an ultimatum demanding control over vehicles and armaments of the 135th and 139th motorized rifle regiments of the 295th Motor Rifle Division. The transfer of the property of the 4th Army (except for over half the equipment of the 366th Guards Motor Rifle Regiment of the 23rd Division captured by Armenian armed formations in 1992 during the regiment's withdrawal from Stepanakert) and the 49th Arsenal was completed in 1992. Thus, by the end of 1992, the Azerbaijani Government received arms and military hardware sufficient for approximately three motor rifle divisions with prescribed army units. The stores and equipment of the 75th Division were handed over to the Nakhchivan government. The former Division HQs may have contributed to the formation of corps headquarters.

=== Twenty-first century ===
Azerbaijan reorganized its army, and has been preparing its armed forces for possible action against Armenian forces in Nagorno-Karabakh. Intermittent fighting continued, most recently breaking out into the 2020 Nagorno-Karabakh conflict.

Azerbaijan has contracted with Turkey for troop training to strengthen its armed forces. This is necessary in view of deficiencies that Jane's World Armies said in 2004 included huge problems in training, equipping and motivating its soldiers; corruption in its ranks; and a highly politicized officer corps. The Soviet Army tradition of dedovshchina, institutionalized hazing, appeared to be continuing in the armed forces as of 2008. The quality and readiness of much of the army's equipment, Jane's said, is also a problem, as a decade of poor maintenance and chronic shortages of spare parts meant that many systems were not operational, or cannibalised for parts. Azerbaijan has the second-highest military expenditure in CIS. Azerbaijan's defence spending is second only to Russia's within the Commonwealth of Independent States.

During the 2020 Nagorno-Karabakh conflict, the Azerbaijani army was widely accused of committing war crimes against Armenian soldiers and civilians. Human Rights Watch and Amnesty International both condemned Azerbaijan's "indiscriminate" shelling of Armenian civilians, including the use of cluster munitions. In addition, videos of Azerbaijani soldiers mistreating or executing captive Armenians were circulated online and received widespread condemnation.

=== Foreign deployments ===
One officer, 1 sergeant and 32 soldiers formed part of the Turkish Army battalion deployed as part of the Kosovo Force from September 1999. The Azerbaijanis oversaw eighteen settlements. On 26 February 2008, as Kosovo declared its independence, Azerbaijani President Ilham Aliyev addressed the National Assembly to call for the withdrawal of Azerbaijani peacekeepers from Kosovo. Within ten days the address was accepted. On April 15 of the same year the platoon returned to Azerbaijan. About 400 Azerbaijani servicemen were peacekeepers in Kosovo.

Azerbaijani servicemen were deployed to Iraq as part of Combined Joint Task Force 7 in 2003. The peacekeeping unit consisted of 14 officers, 16 sergeants and 120 privates, who secured the hydroelectric power station and reservoir in Haditha from August 2003. One company of Azerbaijani peacekeepers commanded by Captain Nasimi Javadov guarded the area of Haditha Dam, which is one of the principal sources of electricity in Iraq. An Azerbaijani delegation headed by the Deputy Minister of Defence visited the Hadithah Dam at the invitation of the Marine Corps officials.

From 2004 the company became part of the USMC led Multi-National Forces West. Ilham Aliyev's address to recall the Azerbaijani peacekeepers in Iraq was accepted at the plenary session of National Assembly by eighty six votes in favor and one against Four Azerbaijani officers in Iraq (Maj. Huseyn Dashdamirov, Capt. Nasimi Javadov, Capt. Alizamin Karimov and Sr. Lt. Abdulla Abdullayev) have been awarded the US Navy and Marines Corps Achievement Medal.

==== Afghanistan ====
Azerbaijan sent a platoon of 21 soldiers, one officer, First Lieutenant Shamil Mammadov, and one NCO to the International Security Assistance Force (ISAF) in Afghanistan in November 2002 to contribute to peace, security and order. The platoon performed patrolling duties in southern Kabul. On 2 October 2008 the National Assembly passed a decision to send 45 more peacekeepers to Afghanistan. In an interview with the Azeri Press Agency Brigadier-General Richard Blanchette gave ISAF's thanks for Azerbaijan's contribution. The number of peacekeepers serving in the Resolute Support mission in Afghanistan was raised from 94 to 120 on 9 January 2018. according to an amendment by the Milli Majlis on 29 December 2017.

== Structure ==
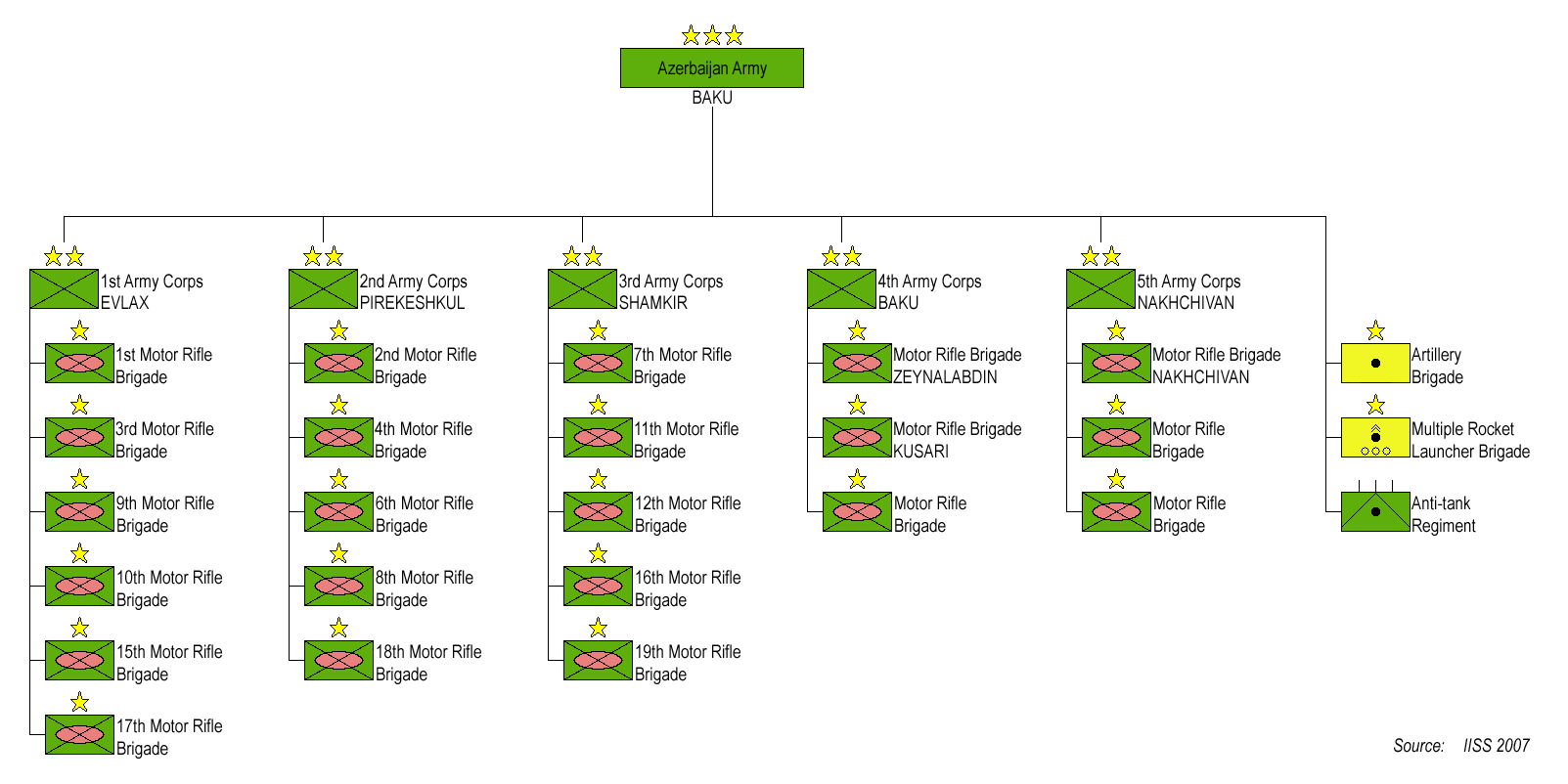
Azerbaijani Land Forces Structure 2007

Opposed by Armenian forces, the Azerbaijani military was forced back out of Nagorno-Karabakh and was significantly reorganised in the mid-1990s predominantly around brigades, though at least one division was reported as late as 2000. Manoeuvre formations have consistently stayed at a strength of around twenty brigades and regiments since 1995, though that has slowly risen recently. During the 1990s, these brigades may have included the 701st Motor Rifle Brigade (1st Army Corps), the 708th Motor Rifle Brigade (1st Army Corps), 130th Motor Rifle Brigade (1st Army Corps), 161st Motor Rifle Brigade (2nd Army Corps), 709th Motor Rifle Brigade (formerly the 23rd Motor Rifle Division), and the 112th Motor Rifle Brigade.

The Land Forces currently consist of five army corps:

- 1st Army Corps also known as Barda Army Corps (deployed near Ganja ), currently led by Major General Hikmat Hasanov
  - 1st Motor Rifle Brigade
  - 3rd Motor Rifle Brigade
  - 9th Motor Rifle Brigade
  - 10th Motor Rifle Brigade
  - 15th Motor Rifle Brigade
  - 17th Motor Rifle Brigade
- 2nd Army Corps also known as Beylagan Army Corps (concentrated against Armenian occupied territories and part is deployed on the Azerbaijan-Iranian border), currently led by Major General Mais Barkhudarov
  - 2nd Motor Rifle Brigade
  - 4th Motor Rifle Brigade
  - 6th Motor Rifle Brigade
  - 8th Motor Rifle Brigade
  - 13th Motor Rifle Brigade
  - 14th Motor Rifle Brigade
  - 18th Motor Rifle Brigade
- 3rd Army Corps also known as Shamkir Army Corps (concentrated against Armenian occupied territories), currently led by Lieutenant General Rovshan Akbarov
  - 7th Motor Rifle Brigade
  - 11th Motor Rifle Brigade
  - 12th Motor Rifle Brigade
  - 16th Motor Rifle Brigade
  - 19th Motor Rifle Brigade
  - 20th Motor Rifle Brigade
- 4th Army Corps also known as Baku Army Corps (covers Absheron Peninsula and the coast)
  - Motor Rifle Brigade
  - Motor Rifle Brigade
  - Motor Rifle Brigade
- Nakhchivan Separate Combined Arms Army (deployed in Nakhchivan, currently led by Colonel General Karam Mustafayev
- 6th Army Corps

The IISS estimated in 2007 that the Azerbaijani regular army was 56,840 strong, probably basing this figure on Conventional Forces in Europe treaty data. It attributes to the army five corps headquarters, 23 motor rifle brigades, one artillery brigade, one multiple rocket launcher brigade, and one anti-tank regiment. Of the five army corps, the 1st, 2nd, and 3rd Army Corps are concentrated against NK; part of 2nd is deployed on the Azerbaijan-Iranian border; the 4th covers the capital and the coast and the 5th is deployed exclusively in Nakhchivan. Following the 2020 war, and specifically during the Baku Victory Parade, experts noted that a 6th corps was created, in part due to the partial mobilization that occurred in the country during that 44-day period.

In addition, the Army maintains the following units:

  - Azerbaijani Special Forces
  - Peacekeeping Battalion
  - Security Team
  - Artillery Brigade
  - Multiple Rocket Launcher Brigade
  - Anti-Tank Regiment
  - Communication Brigade
  - Engineering Brigade
  - Logistics Brigade
  - Commando Brigades

== Ranks ==
=== Commissioned officer ranks ===
The rank insignia of commissioned officers.

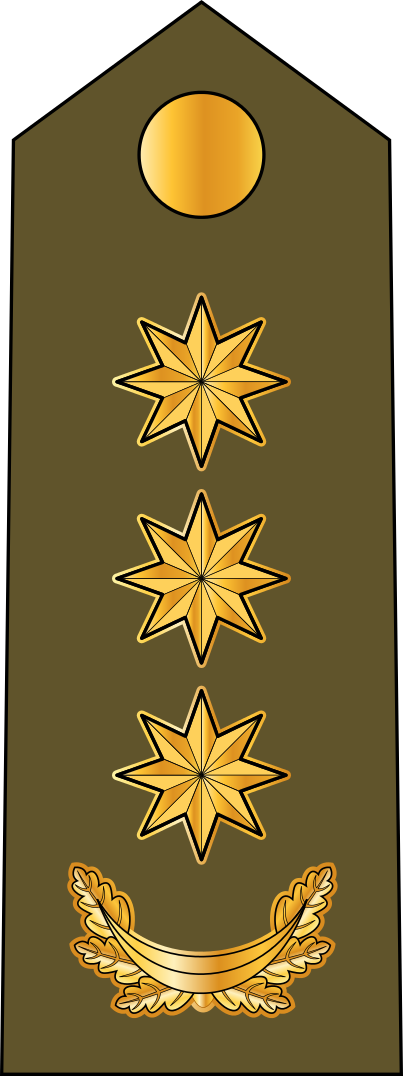
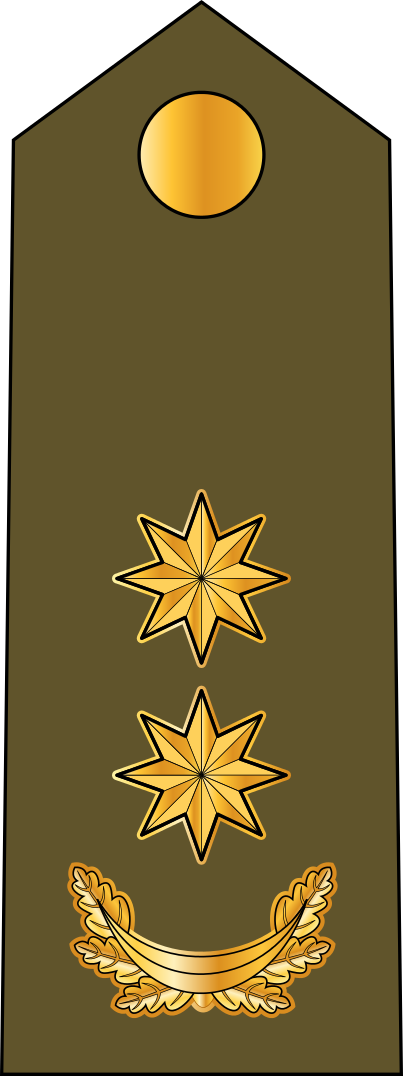
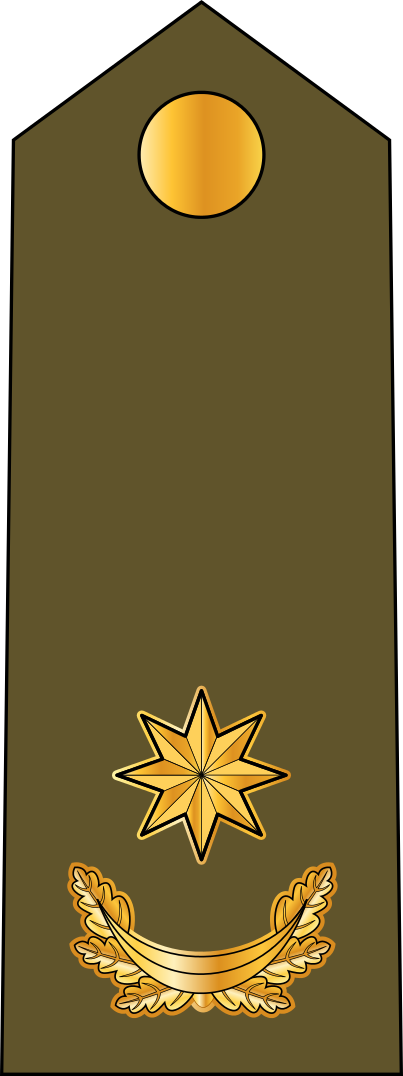
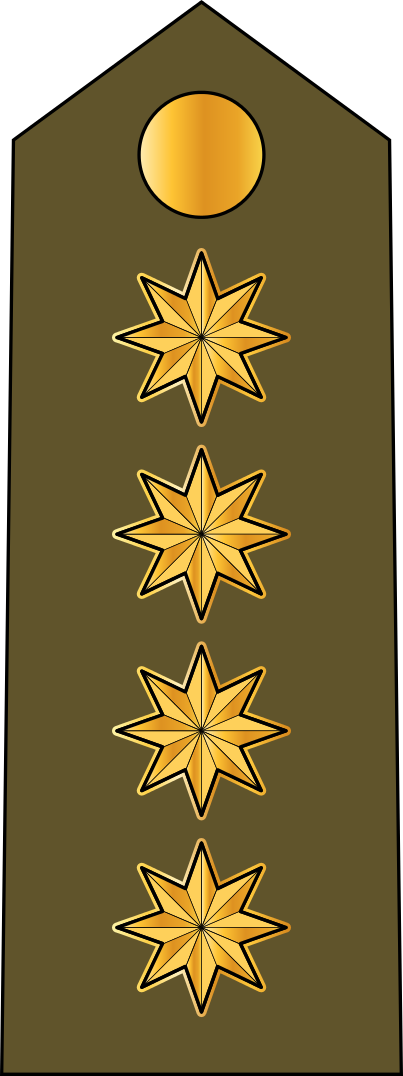
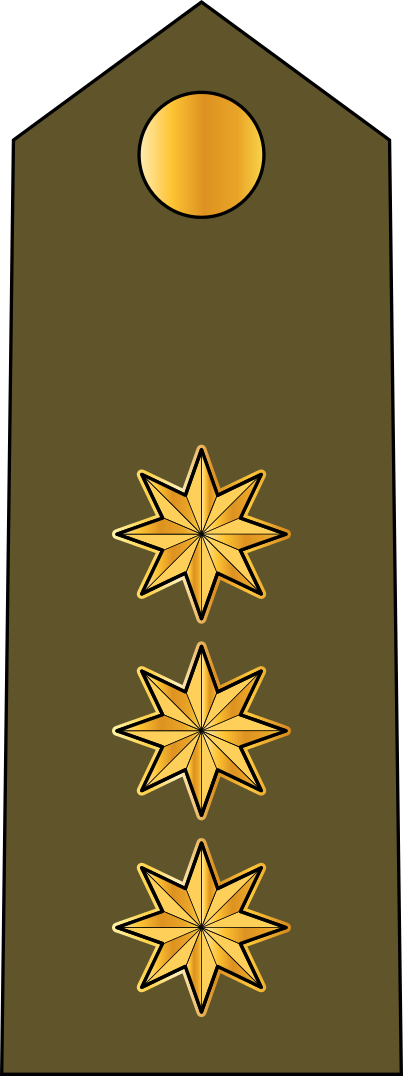
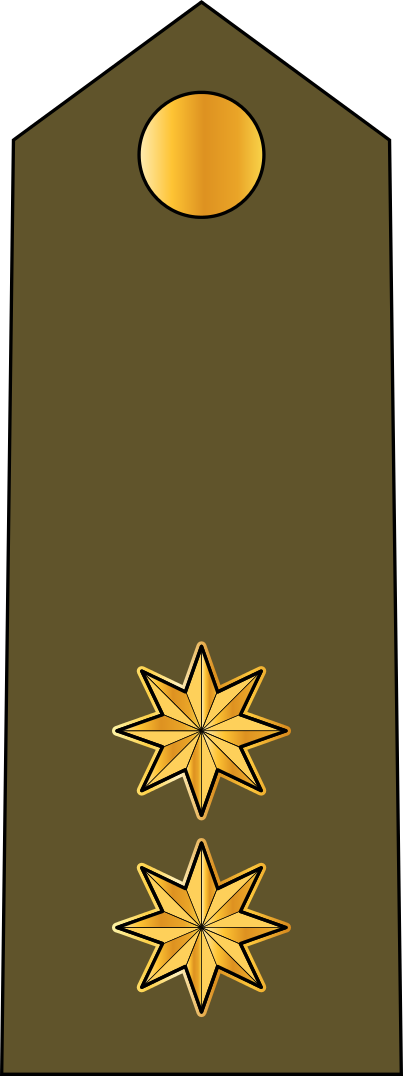
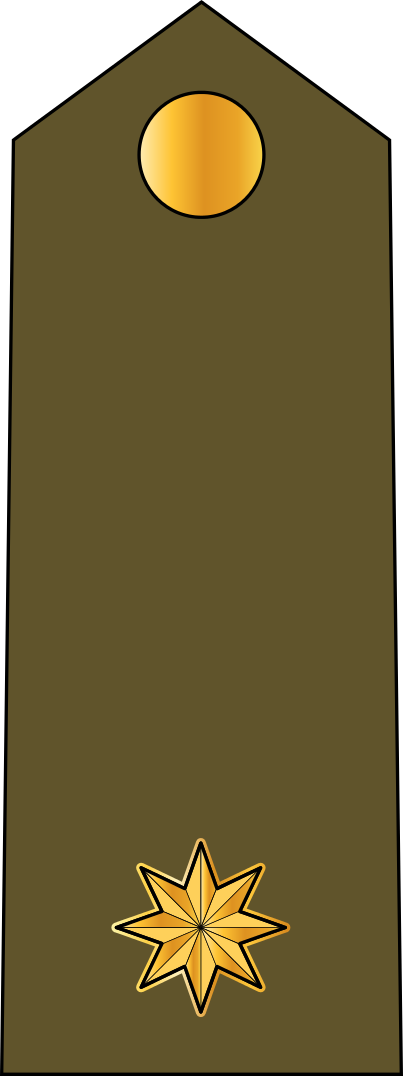
| Rank group | General / flag officers | | | | Senior officers | | | Junior officers |
|---|---|---|---|---|---|---|---|---|---|---|---|
| Azerbaijani Land Forces |
| Azerbaijani Land Forces | Ordu generalı | General-polkovnik | General-leytenant | General-mayor | Polkovnik | Polkovnik-leytenant | Mayor | Kapitan | Baş leytenant | Leytenant | Kiçik leytenant |

=== Other ranks ===
The rank insignia of non-commissioned officers and enlisted personnel.

| Rank group | Senior NCOs | | | | | | Junior NCOs | Enlisted |
|---|---|---|---|---|---|---|---|---|
| Azerbaijani Land Forces | | | | | | | | No insignia |
| Azerbaijani Land Forces | Baş gizir | Gizir | Kiçik gizir | Baş çavuş | Çavuş | Kiçik çavuş | Baş əsgər | Əsgər |

== Service March ==
The service march of the Lane Forces is "Forward" (Marş "İrəli") also known as the "Soldier's Anthem" (Əsgər Marşı). The lyrics are based on that of the Regiment March, which is the official march of the Special Forces Command of Turkey. The lyrics of the march are as follows:

English Text
The homeland brought me up
Sent to these years
He called the land a victim
He turned to God
"Don't sit idle, work," he said
Serve the Motherland
My milk is not halal for you
You bow to the enemy
March forward! March forward!
Azerbaijani soldier!
Irrevocable, irreversible
Azerbaijani soldier!
Our pillow is the Motherland
Let our blanket be snow.
If we turn away from this path
Shame on us!
How wonderful it is for us to die
For the beloved Motherland
Burning heart love the country
Always in-between
March forward! March forward!
Azerbaijani soldier!
Irrevocable, irreversible
Azerbaijani soldier!

The march was written by Cavanşir Quliyev. It is performed at all military parades in Azerbaijan.

== See also ==
- Azerbaijani Armed Forces
