= 295th Motor Rifle Division =

Motor rifle division of the Soviet military

- Active: 1964–1992
- Country: Soviet Union
- Branch: Soviet Army
- Type: Motorized infantry
- Garrison/HQ: Baku
- Decorations: Order of Lenin Order of the Red Banner Order of Suvorov 2nd class
- Battle honours: Kherson

The 295th Khersonskaya order of Lenin Red Banner order of Suvorov Motorised Rifle Division (Russian: 295-я мотострелковая Херсонская ордена Ленина Краснознамённая ордена Суворова дивизия) (Military Unit: 39486) was a division of the Soviet Ground Forces. It was based in Baku for its entire existence.

The division had gained the honorific "Kherson" by Prikaz of the VGK No. 67 of 23 March 1944.

After the end of the Second World War, the 295th Rifle Division (Second Formation) was initially part of the Group of Soviet Forces in Germany with the 32nd Rifle Corps in the summer of 1945. However, it was soon relocated to Stavropol in the North Caucasus Military District with the 23rd Rifle Corps, where it became the 30th Separate Rifle Brigade in 1946. In October 1953, the brigade was upgraded into the 295th Rifle Division. In 1955 it was renumbered the 49th Rifle Division.

On 25 June 1957 the division was reorganized as the 49th Motor Rifle Division. In November 1964 it was renamed as the 295th Motor Rifle Division, restoring its historic Second World War numerical designation.

It formed part of the 4th Army. Comprised 298th Tank Regiment (Gyuzhdek), 135th Motor Rifle Regiment (with BTR); 139th MRR (with BMP), both based in Baku; the 140th Motor Rifle Regiment (Kusary); and the 1090th Artillery Regiment.

It was disbanded in June 1992 and the equipment was handed over to Azerbaijan.

== Commanders ==
- Dorofeev, Alexander Petrovich (01.10.1941-27.03.1942), Colonel wounded;
- Sklyarov, Sergey Fedorovich (28.03.1942 — 11.06.1942), Colonel;
- Safaryan, Nver Georgievich (15.06.1942-28.12.1942), Colonel;
- Petukhov, Viktor Ivanovich (29.12.1942 — 08.01.1943), Colonel;
- Filatov, Alexander Alekseevich (09.01.1943-06.04.1943), Major General;
- Krasnovsky, Serafim Andrianovich (07.04.1943 — 10.06.1943), Colonel;
- Dorofeev, Alexander Petrovich (11.06.1943-08.07.1947), Colonel, from 03.06.1944 Major General.
