= 3rd Army Corps (Azerbaijan) =

- Azerbaijani: 3-cü ordu korpusu
- Badge of the 3rd Army Corps
- Country: Azerbaijan
- Branch: Azerbaijani Land Forces
- Garrison/HQ: Shamkir
- Nickname: Shamkir Army Corps
- Engagements: 2012 Armenian–Azerbaijani border clashes; 2016 Nagorno-Karabakh conflict; 2020 Nagorno-Karabakh war

The 3rd Army Corps (Azerbaijani: 3-cü Ordu Korpusu), also referred to as the Shamkir Army Corps is a regional military formation of the Azerbaijani Land Forces, concentrated against Armenian occupied territories in Nagorno-Karabakh.

== History ==
Soldiers of the corps took part in the 2012 Armenian–Azerbaijani border clashes. A Ganja Military Court passed a verdict against six commanding officers of the Shamkir Corps of the Armed Forces of Azerbaijan, who were accused "of negligence and admitting sabotage of the Armenian Armed Forces in June 2012, which killed five Azerbaijani soldiers", referring to the casualties during the 2012 clashes. The court sentenced the officers to 4–5 years in prison. Until 2018, forces of the 707th Motorized Rifle Brigade of the 3rd Army Corps guarded the Qazax sector of the Armenia–Azerbaijan border. As a result of the 2020 Armenian–Azerbaijani skirmishes in the Tovuz District, the Chief of Staff of the 3rd Corps, Major General Polad Hashimov, was killed. During the 2020 Nagorno-Karabakh conflict, the corps took part in clashes in western Azerbaijan.

== Commanders ==
- Major General Fikret Mammadov (May 1998-15 May 2002)
- Colonel Garay Bagirov (15 May 2002-)
- Major General Chingiz Shafiev (-23 February 2011)
- Lieutenant General Rovshan Akbarov (2011-2020)

== Composition ==
- HQ
- 7th Motor Rifle Brigade
- 11th Motor Rifle Brigade
- 12th Motor Rifle Brigade
- 16th Motor Rifle Brigade
- 19th Motor Rifle Brigade
- 20th Motor Rifle Brigade

== Corps territory ==
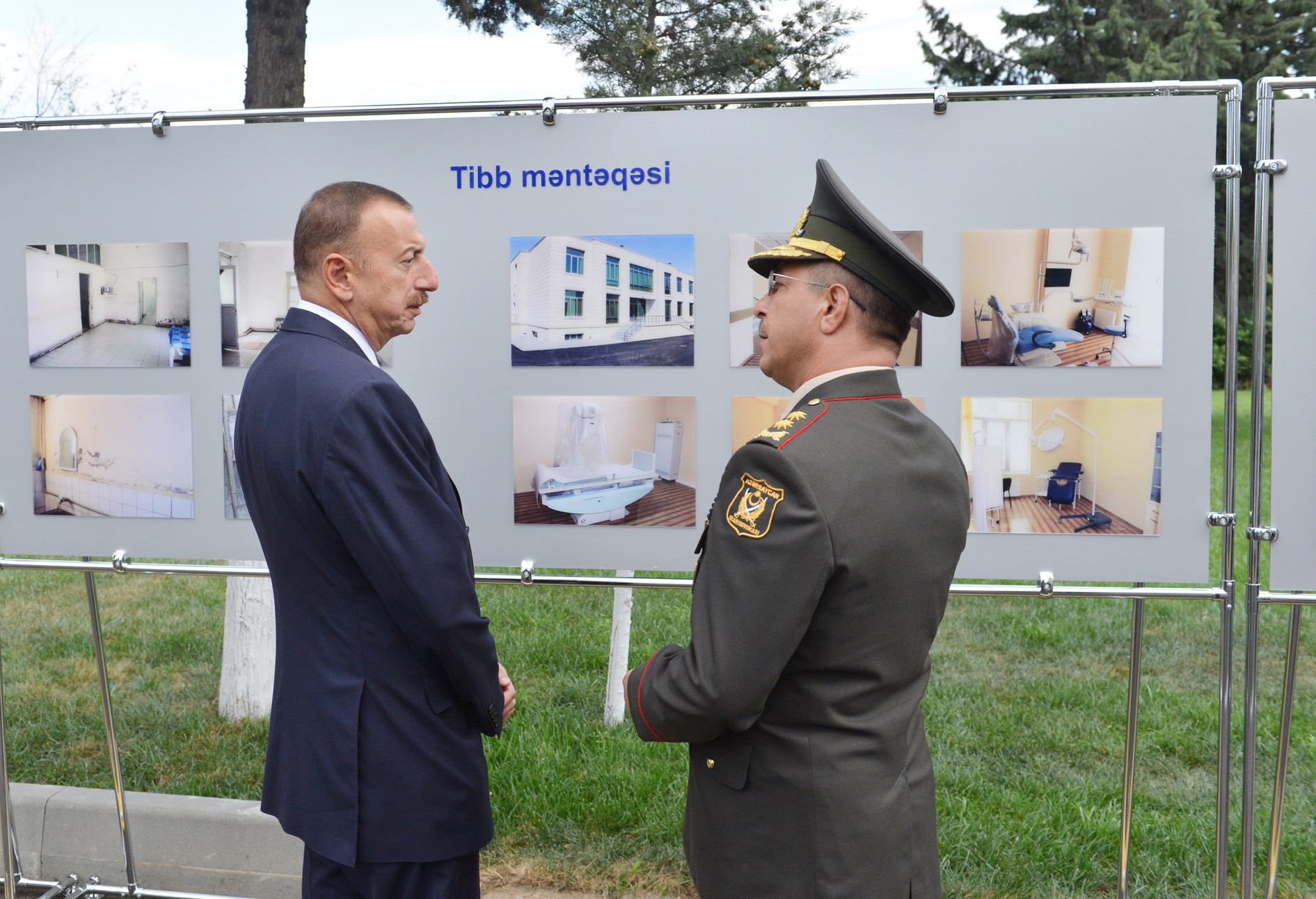
Rovshan Akbarov and Ilham Aliyev at the corps.

On 15 November 2014, President Ilham Aliyev took part in the opening of the headquarters building, built on the territory of the corps. Among the assets on the territory of the corps are the following: Heydar Aliyev Museum, Barracks, 500-seat auditorium, Library, Computer room, Soldiers Club, Medical Center, and Soldiers' Canteen. There is also a parade ground, a sports town, and a swimming pool that were constructed in the military townlet.

== Incidents ==
In February 2011, a soldier of the corps shot 8 Azerbaijani servicemen dead at a defense point near Martakert.
